= Tennessee State Route 44 =

State highway in Tennessee, United States

State Route 44
- SR 44 mainline in red

Route information
- Maintained by TDOT
- Length: 21.4 mi (34.4 km)
- Existed: October 1, 1923–present

Major junctions
- South end: US 11E / US 19W / SR 34 in Bluff City
- North end: SR 75 near Abingdon, VA

Location
- Country: United States
- State: Tennessee
- Counties: Sullivan

Highway system
- Tennessee State Routes; Interstate; US; State
← SR 43	→ US 45

State Route 44 (SR 44) is a state highway in the U.S. state of Tennessee. It runs from US 11E/US 19W/SR 34 in Bluff City, just south of the split of US 19W and US 19E, northeast via Hickory Tree and Holston Valley to the Virginia state line, where it becomes Virginia State Route 75. The entire highway is located within Sullivan County.

== Route description ==
SR 44 begins as a 2-lane highway in Bluff City at an intersection with US 11E/US 19W/SR 34 just south of that route's interchange with US 19E/SR 37, where US 19E and 19W merge to form US 19. The highway then goes north along the former route of US 11E/US 19, where it has an intersection with US 19E/SR 37 a short distance later before entering downtown. The highway then parallels the South Fork Holston River and a railroad track before having an intersection with SR 390, where it breaks away from the former route of US 11E/US 19 to follow its own path. The highway then makes a right onto Fleming Drive before immediately making a right onto Main Street. SR 44 then passes through the center of town before leaving Bluff City and going east, still paralleling the Houston River. The highway then winds its way through farmland as it gradually starts veering northeast, where it has an intersection with SR 358. SR 44 then passes through the community of Hickory Tree before crossing the River and turning north via a sharp left at a 4-way stop intersection. The highway then comes to an intersection with US 421/SR 34, where it turns east to become concurrent with that highway. They go east as a 4-lane divided highway to enter Holston Valley where they have an intersection with SR 435, before narrowing to 2-lanes, where it leaves US 421/SR 34 and goes north via a Y-Intersection shortly afterwards. SR 44 then passes by a marina for South Holston Lake shortly before coming to an end at the Virginia state line, where it continues into Virginia as Virginia State Route 75.

== Major intersections ==
The entire route is in Sullivan County.

Location	mi	km	Destinations	Notes
Bluff City	0.0	0.0	US 11E / US 19W (Bristol Highway/SR 34) – Johnson City, Bristol	Southern terminus
Bluff City			US 19E (SR 37) to US 11E / US 19 – Johnson City, Bristol, Elizabethton	
Bluff City			SR 390 north (Bluff City Highway)	Southern terminus of SR 390
			SR 358 north (Weaver Pike)	Southern terminus of SR 358
			US 421 north (SR 34) – Bristol	Southern end of US 421/SR 34 concurrency
Holston Valley			SR 435 south (Bristol Caverns Highway) – Bristol Caverns	Northern terminus of SR 435
Holston Valley			US 421 south (SR 34) – Mountain City	Northern end of US 421/SR 34 concurrency
	21.4	34.4	SR 75 north (Green Spring Road) to I-81 – Abingdon	Virginia state line; northern terminus
1.000 mi = 1.609 km; 1.000 km = 0.621 mi: Concurrency terminus
