= Tennessee State Route 358 =

State highway in Tennessee, United States

State Route 358
- Weaver Pike
- TN 358 highlighted in red

Route information
- Maintained by TDOT
- Length: 9.4 mi (15.1 km)
- Existed: July 1, 1983–present

Major junctions
- South end: SR 44 near Bluff City
- SR 394 in Bristol
- North end: US 11E / US 19 in Bristol

Location
- Country: United States
- State: Tennessee
- Counties: Sullivan

Highway system
- Tennessee State Routes; Interstate; US; State
← SR 357	→ SR 359

State Route 358 (SR 358) is a state highway in Sullivan County in the Tri-Cites region of East Tennessee.

== Route description ==
SR 358 begins at SR 44 east of Bluff City. It then heads north and crosses the Holston River and continues north and then turns northeastward after it passes Sullivan East High School it then turns eastward then back north and enters Bristol City limits to junction with SR 394. It then continues a northerly track and ends at US 11E/US 19/SR 34 in Bristol.

== Junction list ==
The entire route is in Sullivan County.

Location	mi	km	Destinations	Notes
	0.0	0.0	SR 44 (Rockhold Road) – Bluff City, South Holston Dam	Southern terminus
Bristol			SR 394 – Blountville, Bristol	Interchange via Two-way access road
Bristol	9.4	15.1	US 11E / US 19 (SR 34 / Volunteer Parkway) – Bristol, Bluff City, Johnson City	Northern terminus
1.000 mi = 1.609 km; 1.000 km = 0.621 mi
