= List of state routes in Tennessee =

- Primary and secondary state routes

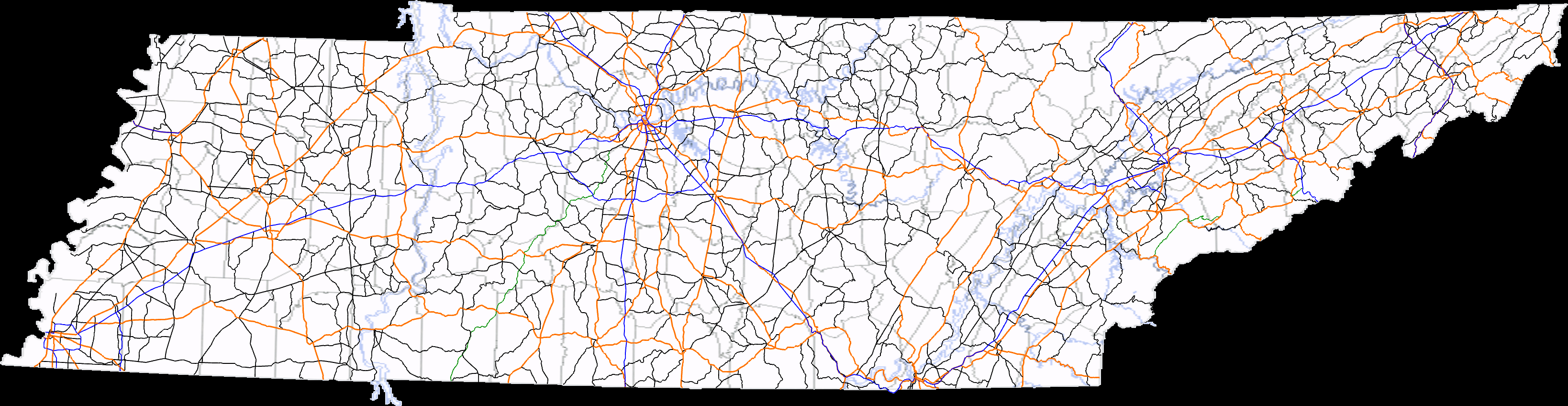
- All Tennessee Primary State Routes in black with Interstates in blue

System information
- Maintained by TDOT

Highway names
- Interstates: Interstate XX (I-XX)
- US Highways: U.S. Route XX (US XX)
- State: State Route XX (SR XX)

System links
- Tennessee State Routes; Interstate; US; State

The Tennessee state routes do not follow a systematic numbering system unlike the U.S. Highway System and some other states' highway systems. The routes are separated into primary and secondary routes, however. Many of the routes are hidden in that they are overlaid on U.S. Routes and not signed. The mile markers throughout Tennessee, however, show the state route number for these hidden routes.

The Tennessee Department of Transportation (TDOT) maintains these routes under the "State Highways" title of state law, but designates them as "state routes". The triangle marker design was the only design until November 1983, when Tennessee divided its routes into primary routes and secondary or "arterial" routes with the adoption of a functional classification system, creating a primary marker and making the triangle marker the secondary marker; primary marker signs were posted in 1984.

== List ==
Number	Length (mi)	Length (km)	Southern or western terminus	Northern or eastern terminus	Formed	Removed	Notes
SR 1	538.8	867.1	I-55/US 61/US 64/US 70/US 78/US 79 (Memphis & Arkansas Bridge) in Memphis	US 11E/US 19/SR 34 in Bristol	1915	current	
SR 2	197.0	317.0	US 41/US 70S/SR 1 in Murfreesboro	US 11/US 70/SR 1 in Farragut	1923	current	Mostly unsigned companion route for US 41 and US 11; only signed on an independent section near Kimball
SR 3	135.53	218.11	US 51 at the Mississippi state line in Memphis	US 45 at the Kentucky state line in South Fulton	1923	current	Mostly unsigned companion route for US 51
SR 4	17.1	27.5	US 78 at the Mississippi state line in Shelby County	US 64/US 70/US 79/SR 1 in Memphis	1923	current	Unsigned companion route for US 78
SR 5	120.0	193.1	US 45 at the Mississippi state line in Guys	KY 125 at the Kentucky state line near Woodland Mills	1923	current	
SR 6	150.93	242.90	US 43/SR 13 at the Alabama state line in Saint Joseph	US 31E/US 231 at the Kentucky state line near Westmoreland	1923	current	Unsigned companion route for US 43, US 31, and US 31E
SR 7	80.75	129.95	SR 53 at the Alabama state line in Ardmore	SR 100/SR 46 in Bon Aqua	1923	current	
SR 8	75.43	121.39	US 41/US 76/SR 3 at the Georgia state line in East Ridge	SR 56 in McMinnville	1923	current	
SR 9	131.33	211.36	US 25W at the Kentucky state line in Jellico	US 25/US 70 at the North Carolina state line near Del Rio	1923	current	Unsigned companion route for US 25, US 25W, and US 70
SR 10	132.40	213.08	US 231/US 431/SR 1 at the Alabama state line in Lincoln County	KY 99 at the Kentucky state line in Macon County	1923	current	
SR 11	146.20	235.29	SR 207 at the Alabama state line in Minor Hill	US 41 at the Kentucky state line in Montgomery County	1923	current	
SR 12	62.46	100.52	US 31/US 41/US 41A/US 431/SR 6/SR 11 in Nashville	US 41A at the Kentucky state line in Clarksville	1923	current	
SR 13	153.01	246.25	SR 17 at the Alabama state line in Wayne County	US 79 at the Kentucky state line in Montgomery County	1923	current	
SR 14	57.9	93.2	US 61 at the Mississippi state line in Memphis	SR 54 in Tipton County	1923	current	
SR 15	261.64	421.07	SR 14 in Memphis	US 41/US 41A/SR 2 in Monteagle	1923	current	
SR 16	76.94	123.82	SR 79 at the Alabama state line in Franklin County	US 31A/US 41A/SR 11 in Kirkland	1923	current	
SR 17	12.45	20.04	SR 193 at the Georgia state line in Chattanooga	SR 58/SR 153 in Chattanooga	c. 1963	current	
SR 17	—	—	SR 22 (current junction with SR 100) in Jacks Creek	Mississippi state line	1923	c. 1931	Replaced by SR 22
SR 18	47.04	75.70	MS 7 at the Mississippi state line in Fayette County	US 45/SR 5 in Jackson	1923	current	
SR 18A	1.7	2.7	SR 57 in Grand Junction	SR 18 north of Grand Junction	c. 1953	1983	Now SR 368
SR 19	48.95	78.78	At Mississippi River in Lauderdale County	I-40 near Brownsville	1923	current	
SR 20	145.06	233.45	US 51/US 412/SR 3/SR 211 in Dyersburg	US 43/SR 6 near Summertown	1923	current	
SR 21	39.88	64.18	At Mississippi River near Tiptonville	KY 116/KY 239 at the Kentucky state line in Obion County	1923	current	
SR 22	171.33	275.73	MS 2 at the Mississippi state line near Michie	Kentucky state line in Lake County	1923	current	
SR 22A	26.0	41.8	SR 22/SR 69 in Milledgeville	SR 22 in Lexington	1958	current	
SR 23	8.76	14.10	US 51/US 64/US 70/US 72/US 79/SR 3 in Memphis	I-240 in Memphis	c. 1961	current	
SR 23	—	—	SR 1/US 70 in Jackson	SR 6 in Summertown	1923	c. 1927	Replaced by SR 20
SR 24	131.11	211.00	US 70/US 70S/SR 1 in Nashville	US 127/SR 28 in Crossville	1923	current	Unsigned companion route for US 70 and US 70N
SR 25	67.45	108.55	SR 161 in Robertson County	US 70N/SR 24/SR 53 in South Carthage	1923	current	
SR 26	59.25	95.35	US 70/SR 24 in Lebanon	US 70/SR 1 in Sparta	1923	current	Unsigned companion route for US 70
SR 27	48.51	78.07	US 72/SR 2 at the Alabama state line in South Pittsburg	US 27/SR 1 at the Georgia state line in Chattanooga	1923	current	
SR 28	132.37	213.03	I-24 in Jasper	US 127/SR 111 at the Kentucky state line in Static	1923	current	
SR 29	141.95	228.45	US 27 at the Georgia state line in Chattanooga	US 27 at the Kentucky state line in Winfield	1923	current	Mostly unsigned companion route for US 27, except for a section between Rockwood and Harriman
SR 29A	8.2	13.2	US 27/SR 29/SR 61 in Harriman	US 27/SR 29 north of Harriman	c. 1963	1983	Now SR 328
SR 30	118.15	190.14	US 70S/SR 1 in McMinnville	US 64/US 74/SR 40 in the Cherokee National Forest	1923	current	
SR 31	17.30	27.84	US 11W/SR 1 in Hawkins County	SR 66 in Sneedville	c. 1966	current	
SR 31	—	—	SR 1/US 70 in Jackson	Kentucky state line	1923	1928	Replaced by SR 29
SR 32	89.47	143.99	NC 1397 at the North Carolina state line in Cocke County	US 25E at the Kentucky state line at Cumberland Gap Tunnel	1923	current	
SR 33	174.42	280.70	US 411/SR 61 at the Georgia state line in Polk County	SR 696 at the Virginia state line in Hancock County	1923	current	
SR 34	154.09	247.98	US 11E/US 25W/US 70/SR 9 in Knox County	US 421 at the North Carolina state line near Trade	1923	current	Unsigned companion route for US 11E and US 421
SR 35	81.35	130.92	US 129/SR 115 in Alcoa	US 11E/US 321/SR 34/SR 93 in Greeneville	1923	current	Mostly unsigned companion route for US 411 and US 321, except for a section in Maryville, which is Washington Street/Hall Road
SR 36	28.6	46.0	US 19W at the North Carolina state line in Unicoi County	US 23 at the Virginia state line in Kingsport	1923	current	
SR 37	30.98	49.86	US 19E at the North Carolina state line in Roan Mountain	US 11E/US 19/US 19W/SR 34 in Bluff City	1923	current	Unsigned companion route for US 19E
SR 38	2.96	4.76	US 11/SR 58 at the Georgia state line in Chattanooga	US 11/US 41/US 64/US 72/SR 2 in Chattanooga	1923	current	Unsigned companion route for US 11
SR 39	31.49	50.68	I-75 in Riceville	SR 68 in Tellico Plains	1941	current	
SR 39	—	—	SR 30 in Athens	SR 33 in Etowah	1923	1941	Replaced by SR 30; SR 39 was reassigned to the old route of SR 30 east of Athens
SR 40	39.63	63.78	US 11/US 64/SR 2 in Cleveland	US 64/US 74 at the North Carolina state line near Ducktown	1923	current	Unsigned companion route for US 64/US 74
SR 41	22.96	36.95	US 31W/US 41/SR 11 in Goodlettsville	US 31W/SR 109/SR 259 at the Kentucky state line Portland	c. 1927	current	Unsigned companion route for US 31W
SR 41	—	—	SR 1/SR 19/US 70 in Brownsville	SR 3/US 51 in Union City	1923	c. 1927	Replaced by SR 5 and SR 54
SR 42	61.15	98.41	US 70/SR 1 in Sparta (original ending)	US 127/SR 28 at the Kentucky state line in Static	c. 1931	1992	Replaced by SR 111; south end truncated to Cookeville in 1975
SR 42	—	—	SR 24 in Algood	SR 1/US 70 in Crossville	c. 1927	c. 1931	Replaced by SR 24; SR 42 was reassigned to the old route of SR 24 northeast of Cookeville
SR 42	—	—	SR 5 in Three Way	SR 22 in Union City	1923	c. 1927	Replaced by SR 43 and SR 54
SR 43	57.32	92.25	US 45/US 45W/SR 5 in Three Way	KY 129/KY 307 at the Kentucky state line in South Fulton	c. 1927	current	
SR 43	—	—	SR 22 in McKenzie	Kentucky state line	1923	c. 1927	Replaced by SR 69 and SR 76
SR 44	21.26	34.21	US 11E/US 19W/SR 34 in Bluff City	SR 75 at the Virginia state line near Bristol	c. 1933	current	
SR 44	—	—	SR 5 in Henderson	SR 1/US 70 in Huntingdon	1923	c. 1927	Replaced by SR 22 (part became SR 100 c. 1931)
SR 45	17.92	28.84	US 431/SR 65 in Nashville	I-40 in Hermitage	c. 1933	current	
SR 45	—	—	SR 44 (now SR 22/SR 100) in Jacks Creek	SR 15 east of Crump	1923	c. 1927	Replaced by SR 17 (became SR 22 c. 1931)
SR 46	87.5	140.8	US 431/SR 106 near Brentwood	US 79/SR 76 near Fort Campbell	c. 1933	current	
SR 46	—	—	SR 45 (now SR 22) near Right	Saltillo	1923	c. 1925	Replaced by SR 69
SR 47	20.81	33.49	SR 46 in Dickson	SR 48 in Charlotte	c. 1931	current	
SR 47	—	—	SR 1/US 70 in Waverly	Alabama state line	1923	c. 1927	Replaced by SR 13
SR 48	103.86	167.15	SR 13 in Wayne County	KY 104 at the Kentucky state line in Clarksville	1923	current	
SR 49	104.57	168.29	US 79/SR 76 in Dover	KY 383 at the Kentucky state line near Orlinda	1923	current	
SR 50	161.01	259.12	I-40 in Only	SR 56/SR 108 in Altamont	1923	current	
SR 50A	17.1	27.5	SR 50 near Culleoka	US 31A Bus./US 431 Bus./SR 11/SR 50 in Lewisburg	c. 1935	1983	Now SR 373
SR 51	1.91	3.07	SR 52 in Moss	KY 163 at the Kentucky state line in Clay County	c. 1931	current	
SR 51	—	—	Kentucky state line	Alabama state line	1923	c. 1931	Replaced by SR 11, SR 99, and SR 10
SR 52	148.88	239.60	SR 49 in Orlinda	US 27/SR 29 in Elgin	1923	current	
SR 53	123.36	198.53	US 41/SR 2 in Manchester	KY 61 at the Kentucky state line in Clay County	1923	current	
SR 54	122.52	197.18	US 51/SR 3/SR 59 in Covington	US 641/KY 893 at the Kentucky state line near Puryear	c. 1927	current	
SR 54	—	—	SR 24 in Lebanon	SR 1 in Sparta	1923	c. 1925	Replaced by SR 26
SR 55	53.40	85.94	SR 50 in Lynchburg	US 70S/SR 1/SR 380 in McMinnville	1923	current	
SR 56	164.85	265.30	SR 117 at the Alabama state line in Franklin County	KY 63 at the Kentucky state line in Macon County	1923	current	
SR 57	109.61	176.40	SR 14 in Memphis	MS 25 at the Mississippi state line near Pickwick Dam	c. 1927	current	
SR 57	—	—	SR 1 in McMinnville	SR 28 in Pikeville	1923	c. 1927	Replaced by SR 30
SR 58	94.94	152.79	SR 157 at the Georgia state line in Lookout Mountain	SR 95 at Oak Ridge	1923	current	
SR 59	50.83	81.80	At Mississippi River in Tipton County	SR 76 near Somerville	c. 1927	current	
SR 59	—	—	SR 58 in Decatur	SR 2/US 11 in Athens	1923	c. 1927	Replaced by SR 30
SR 60	41.19	66.29	SR 71 at the Georgia state line in Bradley County	US 27/SR 29/SR 378 in Dayton	1923	current	
SR 61	81.67	131.44	US 27/US 70/SR 1/SR 29 in Rockwood	US 11W/SR 1 in Blaine	1923	current	
SR 62	89.93	144.73	SR 84 in Monterey	US 441/SR 33/SR 71 in Knoxville	1923	current	
SR 63	101.06	162.64	US 27/SR 29 in Huntsville	SR 33 in Sneedville	1923	current	
SR 64	50.43	81.16	US 31A/SR 11/SR 271 in Farmington	US 70S/SR 1 near Readyville	c. 1927	current	
SR 64	—	—	SR 39 (now SR 30) near Etowah	SR 33/SR 72 in Maryville	1923	c. 1927	Replaced by SR 33
SR 65	34.98	56.29	US 31W/US 41/US 431/SR 11 in Nashville	US 431 at the Kentucky state line near Springfield	c. 1927	current	Unsigned companion route for US 431
SR 65	—	—	SR 1/US 70 in Knoxville	SR 9 in Newport	1923	c. 1927	Replaced by SR 35
SR 66	86.25	138.81	US 411/US 441/SR 35/SR 71 in Sevierville	SR 33 in Sneedville	1923	current	
SR 67	63.88	102.80	SR 81 in Washington County	NC 88 at the North Carolina state line near Trade	1923	current	
SR 67A	4.9	7.9	I-26/US 19W/US 23 in Johnson City	US 321/SR 67 in Elizabethton	c. 1932	1983	Now SR 359
SR 68	106.89	172.02	SR 5/SR 60 at the Georgia state line in Copperhill	US 127/SR 29 near Crossville	c. 1927	current	
SR 68	—	—	SR 1 in Kingsport	Virginia state line	1924	c. 1927	Replaced by SR 36
SR 69	151.77	244.25	SR 20 at the Alabama state line in Wayne County	KY 97 at the Kentucky state line in Henry County	1924	current	
SR 69A	27.1	43.6	SR 191 in Camden	US 641/SR 69 in Paris	1965	current	
SR 70	63.34	101.94	NC 208 at the North Carolina state line in Greene County	SR 70 at the Virginia state line in Hancock County	1924	current	
SR 71	83.31	134.07	US 441 at the North Carolina state line at Newfound Gap	US 25W/SR 9/SR 116 in Lake City	1924	current	
SR 72	42.7	68.7	US 129/SR 115 in Monroe County	SR 58 in Roane County	1924	current	
SR 73	101.76	163.77	I-40/US 321/SR 95 near Oak Ridge	US 25/US 70/SR 9 in Newport	c. 1927	current	
SR 73	—	—	SR 28 near Jamestown	SR 31 (now SR 29) near Sunbright	1924	c. 1927	Replaced by SR 52
SR 74	18.13	29.18	SR 225 at the Georgia state line on Bradley/Polk county line	US 11 Byp./US 11/SR 2 in Cleveland	c. 1949	current	
SR 74	—	—	SR 2/SR 60/US 11 in Cleveland	North Carolina state line	c. 1927	1941	Replaced by SR 40
SR 74	—	—	SR 24 in Algood	SR 1/US 70 in Crossville	1924	c. 1927	Renumbered SR 42 (now part of SR 24)
SR 75	27.8	44.7	US 11/US 321/SR 34 in Limestone	SR 126 in Blountville	c. 1964	current	
SR 75	—	—	US 25/US 70/SR 9 in Newport	North Carolina state line	c. 1927	c. 1939	Replaced by SR 32
SR 75	—	—	SR 11 in Springfield	US 31W/SR 79 in Portland	1924	c. 1927	Replaced by SR 49 and SR 52
SR 76	231.44	372.47	SR 57 in Moscow	SR 109 in Portland	1924	current	
SR 77	84.86	136.57	US 51/SR 3 in Newbern	US 641/SR 69 in Paris	1924	current	
SR 78	36.01	57.95	SR 104 in Dyersburg	KY 94 at the Kentucky state line in Lake County	1924	current	
SR 79	10.33	16.62	At the Mississippi River in Lake County	SR 78 near Ridgely	c. 1927	current	
SR 79	—	—	SR 11 in Goodlettsville	Dixie Highway near Portland on the Kentucky state line	c. 1925	c. 1927	Replaced by US 31W and SR 41
SR 80	14.08	22.66	SR 25 near Carthage	SR 56/SR 262 in Macon County	c. 1927	current	
SR 81	25.62	41.23	I-26/US 19W/US 23/SR 36/SR 107 in Erwin	SR 93 in Washington County	c. 1927	current	
SR 81A	13.3	21.4	SR 107 in South Central	SR 81 in Jonesborough	—	1983	Now SR 353
SR 82	31.93	51.39	SR 55 in Lynchburg	SR 64 near Beechgrove	c. 1927	current	
SR 83	8.08	13.00	SR 146 in DeKalb County	SR 56 in Smithville	1983	current	
SR 83	—	—	SR 1 Spur (now SR 4) in Memphis	SR 1/SR 1 Spur (now SR 1/SR 57) in Memphis	c. 1964	1983	Replaced by relocated SR 1
SR 83	—	—	SR 2 in Cleveland	SR 58 near Georgetown	c. 1927	1939	Replaced by SR 60
SR 84	40.44	65.08	US 70/SR 1 in Sparta	SR 111 in Livingston	c. 1927	current	
SR 85	85.24	137.18	SR 80 in Smith County	US 127/SR 28 in Fentress County	c. 1927	current	
SR 86	5.18	8.34	US 72/SR 57 in Collierville	US 72 at the Mississippi state line in Piperton	c. 1927	current	Unsigned companion route for US 72 in West Tennessee
SR 87	39.73	63.94	At the Mississippi River in Lauderdale County	SR 19 in Brownsville	c. 1927	current	
SR 87A	4.87	7.84	SR 87 in Cherry	SR 87 near Glimp	1952	1983	Now SR 371
SR 88	44.78	72.07	At the Mississippi River in Lauderdale County	US 412/SR 20 in Bells	c. 1927	current	
SR 89	51.24	82.46	SR 105 in Trimble	KY 381 at the Kentucky state line in Weakley County	c. 1927	current	
SR 90	13.32	21.44	US 25W/SR 9 in Morley	KY 74 at the Kentucky state line in Pruden	c. 1927	current	
SR 91	53.93	86.79	US 11E/SR 34 in Johnson City	SR 91 at the Virginia state line in Johnson County	c. 1927	current	
SR 92	34.88	56.13	US 411/SR 35 in Chestnut Hill	US 11W/SR 1 in Rutledge	c. 1927	current	
SR 93	38.75	62.36	US 11E/US 321/SR 34/SR 35 in Greeneville	SR 224 at the Virginia state line in Kingsport	c. 1927	current	
SR 94	7.92	12.75	SR 66 in Hawkins County	SR 70 in Hawkins County	c. 1927	current	
SR 95	42.23	67.96	US 411/SR 33 in Greenback	SR 61 near Oak Ridge	c. 1927	current	
SR 96	128.2	206.3	US 70/SR 1 in Dickson	SR 53 in Granville	c. 1927	current	
SR 97	5.64	9.08	SR 65 at the Alabama state line in Franklin County	SR 122 in Huntland	c. 1927	current	
SR 98	11.73	18.88	CR 89 at the Alabama state line in Lawrence County	US 43/SR 6 in Leoma	c. 1927	current	
SR 99	126.7	203.9	US 64/SR 15 in Waynesboro	SR 64 in Bradyville	c. 1927	current	
SR 100	158.31	254.78	US 64/SR 15 in Whiteville	US 70S/SR 1 in Belle Meade	c. 1927	current	
SR 101	38.7	62.3	SR 30 in Mount Crest	Fairfield Glade Resort Area	c. 1927	current	
SR 102	13.34	21.47	SR 96 in Rutherford County	SR 266 in Smyrna	c. 1927	current	
SR 103	8.33	13.41	At the Mississippi River in Dyer County	SR 78 in Bogota	c. 1929	current	
SR 104	114.43	184.16	At the Mississippi River in Dyer County	SR 69 in Saltillo	c. 1929	current	
SR 105	44.34	71.36	US 51/SR 3 near Trimble	US 70A/SR 77 in McLemoresville	1943	current	
SR 105	—	—	SR 18 near Bolivar	SR 5/US 45 near Henderson	c. 1929	c. 1939	Portion replaced by SR 100; rest (Now SR 125, Silerton Rd, SR 225, Old Montezuma Rd, W. Main St) decommissioned in exchange for extending SR 100
SR 106	55.84	89.87	US 31A/US 31A Bus./SR 11 in Lewisburg	US 70S/US 431/SR 1 in Nashville	c. 1929	current	Mostly unsigned companion route for US 431
SR 107	78.77	126.77	Near Round Mountain Campground near Del Rio	NC 226 at the North Carolina state line in Unicoi County	c. 1929	current	
SR 108	60.31	97.06	SR 28 in Whitwell	SR 55 Bus./SR 56/SR 380 in McMinnville	c. 1929	current	
SR 109	38.9	62.6	I-840/SR 265 in Lebanon	I-65 in Portland	c. 1929	current	
SR 110	22.46	36.15	SR 53/SR 7 at the Alabama state line in Ardmore	US 231/US 431/SR 10 in Fayetteville	c. 1929	current	
SR 111	118.72	191.06	US 27/SR 29 in Soddy-Daisy	US 127/SR 28 at the Kentucky state line in Static	c. 1929	current	
SR 112	41.85	67.35	US 41A/SR 12 in Nashville	US 41A/US 79/SR 12/SR 13/SR 76 in Clarksville	c. 1929	current	Unsigned companion route for US 41A
SR 113	32.86	52.88	US 25W/US 70/SR 9 near Dandridge	SR 66 in Persia	1966	current	
SR 113	—	—	SR 27 in Glendale	SR 28 near Dunlap	c. 1931	c. 1939	Replaced by SR 8
SR 114	96.49	155.29	US 64/SR 15 in Clifton Junction	SR 77 near Paris	c. 1930	current	
SR 115	52.8	85.0	US 129 at the North Carolina state line in Deals Gap	I-40 in Knoxville	c. 1933	current	Unsigned companion route for US 129
SR 116	41.97	67.54	SR 62 near Petros	US 25W/SR 9/SR 63 in Caryville	1938	current	
SR 117	6.39	10.28	SR 142 in McNairy County	US 64/SR 15/SR 22 in Adamsville	c. 1974	current	
SR 117	—	—	—	—	c. 1939	1940	Location unknown, probably Tiptonville-north (now SR 22) or Union City-north (now SR 21)
SR 118	14.81	23.83	SR 54/SR 89 in Dresden	KY 129 at the Kentucky state line in Dukedom	c. 1939	current	
SR 119	4.7	7.6	US 79/SR 76 in Paris Landing State Park	KY 121 at the Kentucky state line in Henry County	c. 1939	current	
SR 120	12.09	19.46	KY 139 at the Kentucky state line in Stewart County	US 79/SR 76 in Big Rock	c. 1939	current	
SR 121	20.55	33.07	CR 65 at the Alabama state line in Lincoln County	SR 50 near Winchester	c. 1939	current	
SR 122	7.11	11.44	SR 121 in Elora	US 64/SR 15 in Huntland	c. 1941	current	
SR 123	1.19	1.92	SR 68 near Turtletown	NC 294 at the North Carolina state line in Polk County	c. 1941	current	
SR 124	19.19	30.88	US 45E/SR 43/SR 54 in Greenfield	SR 22 in McKenzie	c. 1943	current	
SR 125	37.36	60.13	MS 15 at the Mississippi state line near Middleton	SR 100 at Chickasaw State Park	c. 1945	current	
SR 126	24.58	39.56	SR 93 in Kingsport	US 11W/SR 1 in Bristol	c. 1963	current	
SR 126	—	—	—	—	1947	1948	Location unknown
SR 127	43.52	70.04	US 41A/SR 16 in Decherd	SR 30 near McMinnville	c. 1963	current	
SR 127	—	—	SR 71/US 441 near Knoxville	SR 73	c. 1947	1958	Now Martin Mill Pike, Nails Creek Road, Old Nails Creek Road, Wildwood Road, River Ford Road and Ellejoy Road
SR 128	51.73	83.25	SR 57 in Pickwick Dam	SR 13 near Linden	c. 1947	current	
SR 129	49.22	79.21	US 31/SR 7 in Waco	SR 55 in Lynchburg	c. 1949	current	
SR 130	51.3	82.6	US 431/SR 50/SR 129 in Petersburg	US 64 Business/SR 50 in Winchester	c. 1949	current	
SR 131	68.8	110.7	US 11/US 70/SR 1 in Knoxville	SR 31 in Treadway	c. 1949	current	Lovell Road
SR 132	5.46	8.79	At the Cumberland Mountains near Manring	KY 186 at the Kentucky state line in Claiborne County	c. 1949	1997	Only accessible from Kentucky
SR 133	11.24	18.09	US 421/SR 34/SR 91 in Shady Valley	SR 716 at the Virginia state line in Johnson County	c. 1949	current	
SR 134	6.55	10.54	US 41/US 64/US 72/SR 2 in Haletown	SR 299 in Hamilton County	c. 1949	current	
SR 135	62.87	101.18	SR 289 in Sparta	SR 52 in Clay County	c. 1949	current	
SR 136	56.51	90.94	US 70S/SR 1 in Rock Island	SR 52 in Timothy	c. 1949	current	
SR 137	3.02	4.86	I-26/US 11W/US 23/SR 1 in Kingsport	US 23 at the Virginia state line in Kingsport	c. 1969	current	Unsigned companion route for US 23
SR 137	—	—	SR 53 near Celina	Kentucky state line	c. 1949	c. 1951	Replaced by SR 53
SR 138	23.01	37.03	SR 18 in Toone	I-40 in Madison County	c. 1949	current	
SR 139	24.83	39.96	US 11E/SR 34 in Strawberry Plains	SR 92 in Dandridge	c. 1949	current	
SR 140	43.88	70.62	SR 22 in McKenzie	US 79/SR 76 in Henry County	c. 1949	current	
SR 141	67.59	108.78	SR 52 in Macon County	SR 56 in Silver Point	1951	current	
SR 142	24.59	39.57	US 45/SR 5 in Selmer	CR 100 at the Mississippi state line in Hardin County	c. 1949	current	
SR 143	12.46	20.05	US 19E/SR 37 in Roan Mountain	NC 261 at the North Carolina state line at Roan Mountain	1952	current	
SR 144	7.85	12.63	SR 131 in Plainview	SR 170 near Maynardville	1952	current	
SR 145	9.72	15.64	US 70S/SR 1 in Woodbury	SR 96 in Auburntown	c. 1953	current	
SR 146	17.67	28.44	US 70S/SR 1 in Cannon County	US 70/SR 26 in Smithville	c. 1953	current	
SR 147	23.64	38.04	SR 69A in Big Sandy	SR 49 in Tennessee Ridge	c. 1953	current	
SR 148	3.77	6.07	SR 189 at Georgia state line in Lookout Mountain	US 11/US 41/US 64/US 72/SR 2 in Chattanooga	c. 1953	current	
SR 149	22.31	35.90	SR 49 in Erin	SR 13/SR 48 in Clarksville	c. 1953	current	
SR 150	20.98	33.76	I-24/US 64/US 72/SR 27 in Kimball	US 41/SR 56 in Tracy City	c. 1953	current	Unsigned companion route for US 41
SR 151	7.54	12.13	SR 56 in North Springs	SR 56 in Red Boiling Springs	c. 1953	current	
SR 152	36.88	59.35	US 412/SR 20 near Maury City	US 412/SR 20 near Jackson	c. 1953	current	
SR 153	14.81	23.83	I-75/US 74 in Chattanooga	US 27/SR 29 in Soddy-Daisy	c. 1953	current	
SR 154	19.12	30.77	SR 52 in Jamestown	KY 167 at the Kentucky state line at Big South Fork NRR	c. 1953	current	
SR 155	35.10	56.49	US 70S/SR 1 in Nashville	US 31/SR 6 in Oak Hill	c. 1953	current	
SR 156	35.4	57.0	US 41A/SR 15 near Sewanee	SR 134 in Haletown	c. 1957	current	
SR 157	5.30	8.53	SR 22 near Samburg	KY 311 at the Kentucky state line near Reelfoot National Wildlife Refuge	c. 1957	current	
SR 158	4.6	7.4	US 11/US 70/SR 1 in Knoxville	I-40 in Knoxville	c. 1958	current	
SR 159	12.5	20.1	US 321/SR 67 near Butler	US 321 at North Carolina state line	c. 1958	current	Unsigned companion route for US 321
SR 160	27.1	43.6	US 11E/SR 34 in Morristown	US 321/SR 35 near Newport	c. 1959	current	
SR 161	9.9	15.9	US 431/SR 65 in Springfield	KY 102 at the Kentucky state line in Robertson County	c. 1959	current	
SR 162	7.3	11.7	SR 62 in Solway	SR 33 in Alcoa	1971	current	Broken into two segments by I-140 Pellissippi Parkway
SR 163	16.2	26.1	I-75 near Calhoun	US 411/SR 30/SR 33 in Delano	c. 1971	current	
SR 164	17.0	27.4	US 70N/SR 24 in Monterey	SR 85 in Crawford	c. 1971	current	
SR 165	23.8	38.3	SR 68 in Tellico Plains	NC 143 at the North Carolina state line	c. 1982	current	Also known as Cherohala Skyway
SR 166	51.6	83.0	SR 127 at the Alabama state line in Giles County	US 412/SR 99 in Hampshire	c. 1981	current	
SR 167	21.0	33.8	SR 67 in Doeville	Big Laurel Road at the North Carolina state line in Ashe County	c. 1981	current	
SR 168	16.0	25.7	US 129/SR 115 in Knoxville	US 11E/US 25W/US 70/SR 9 in Knoxville	c. 1982	current	Known locally as John Sevier Highway
SR 169	11.7	18.8	SR 131 in Knoxville	SR 62 in Knoxville	c. 1987	current	Known locally as Middlebrook Pike
SR 170	35.9	57.8	SR 62 in Oak Ridge	SR 33 near Maynardville	c. 1982	current	
SR 171	18.0	29.0	I-24 in Antioch	US 70/SR 24 in Mount Juliet	c. 1982	current	
SR 172	12.2	19.6	US 321/SR 35 in Greeneville	I-81 in Baileyton	c. 1982	current	
SR 173	13.1	21.1	I-26/US 23 in Unicoi	US 19E/SR 37 in Tiger Valley	c. 1982	current	
SR 174	40.9	65.8	US 31W/US 41/SR 11 in Goodlettsville	KY 482 at Kentucky state line in Sumner County	c. 1982	current	
SR 175	26.3	42.3	MS 301 at Mississippi state line in Memphis	US 72/SR 57 in Collierville	1983	current	
SR 176	6.1	9.8	Getwell Road (MS 747) at Mississippi state line in Southaven	I-240 in Memphis	1983	current	
SR 177	13.11	21.10	Winchester Road near SR 385 in Memphis	US 70/US 79/SR 1 in Lakeland	1983	current	
SR 178	11.5	18.5	US 51/SR 3 in Munford	SR 59 in Gilt Edge	1983	current	
SR 179	43.4	69.8	SR 54 near Covington	US 64/SR 15 in Whiteville	1983	current	
SR 180	12.52	20.15	SR 19 in Nutbush	US 51/SR 3 in Gates	1983	current	
SR 181	25.1	40.4	SR 88 in Hales Point	SR 79 near Ridgley	1983	current	
SR 182	9.77	15.72	SR 104 in Finley	SR 78 near Dyersburg	1983	current	
SR 183	14.17	22.80	SR 21 near Hornbeak	US 51/SR 3 near Troy	1983	current	
SR 184	12.92	20.79	SR 21 in Troy	US 45W/SR 22/SR 214 in Union City	1983	current	
SR 185	7.67	12.34	US 45W/SR 5/SR 77 in Dyer	SR 54 near Bradford	1983	current	
SR 186	29.5	47.5	US 45/US 70/SR 1 in Jackson	US 45W/SR 5/SR 54 in Trenton	1983	current	
SR 187	7.8	12.6	US 70A/US 79/SR 76 near Humboldt	US 45E/SR 43 in Milan	1983	current	
SR 188	22.2	35.7	SR 54/SR 88 near Alamo	SR 77 in Yorkville	1983	current	
SR 189	5.5	8.9	SR 88 in Maury City	US 412/SR 20 in Friendship	1983	current	
SR 190	55.3	89.0	SR 105 in Trezevant	US 45E/SR 43 near South Fulton	1983	current	
SR 191	24.02	38.66	Nathan Bedford Forrest State Park	I-40 in Benton County	1983	current	
SR 192	10.8	17.4	US 641/SR 69 in Holladay	US 641/SR 69 near Camden	1983	current	
SR 193	17.2	27.7	SR 205 in Fisherville	SR 76 in Williston	1983	current	
SR 194	23.5	37.8	SR 57 in Rossville	SR 59 near Braden	1983	current	
SR 195	7.6	12.2	SR 193 near Macon	SR 76 in Somerville	1983	current	
SR 196	25.6	41.2	US 72/SR 86 in Piperton	US 70/US 79/SR 1 in Gallaway	1983	current	
SR 197	12.5	20.1	US 45/SR 5 in Pinson	SR 200 in Mifflin	1983	current	
SR 198	13.3	21.4	US 70/SR 1 in Jackson	SR 197 near Beech Bluff	1983	current	
SR 199	12.3	19.8	US 45/SR 5 in Finger	SR 224 in Leapwood	1983	current	
SR 200	21.8	35.1	SR 365 in Henderson	SR 22A in Lexington	1983	current	
SR 201	23.0	37.0	SR 22 near Sardis	SR 202 near Decaturville	1983	current	
SR 202	20.5	33.0	SR 69 near Saltillo	US 412/SR 20 near Parsons	1983	current	
SR 203	32.7	52.6	SR 69 in Savannah	SR 13 in Collinwood	1983	current	
SR 204	11.9	19.2	I-40 in Memphis	SR 385 near Millington	1983	current	
SR 205	7.4	11.9	SR 57 in Collierville	US 51/SR 3 in Millington	1983	current	
SR 206	7.6	12.2	SR 14 near Atoka	SR 178 in Munford	1983	current	
SR 207	1.1	1.8	SR 87 in Fulton	Fort Pillow State Historic Park	1983	current	Provides access to Fort Pillow State Historic Park
SR 208	1.44	2.32	SR 209 in Ripley	US 51/SR 3 in Ripley	1983	current	
SR 209	17.5	28.2	US 51/SR 3 in Henning	SR 180 in Gates	1983	current	
SR 210	10.4	16.7	SR 88 in Halls	US 412/SR 20 in Dyersburg	1983	current	
SR 211	18.7	30.1	US 51/SR 3 in Dyersburg	SR 105 in Trimble	1983	current	
SR 212	2.4	3.9	SR 22 in Tiptonville	SR 78 near Tiptonville	1983	current	
SR 213	3.6	5.8	SR 78 near Reelfoot Lake	At Reelfoot Lake Airport	1983	current	
SR 214	9.7	15.6	US 45W/SR 22/SR 184 in Union City	US 51/US 45W/SR 3 in South Fulton	1983	current	
SR 215	2.1	3.4	US 45E/SR 43 in South Fulton	US 51 at Kentucky state line in South Fulton	1983	current	Unsigned companion route for US 45E
SR 216	17.7	28.5	US 45W/SR 5/SR 21 in Rives	US 45E/SR 22/SR 431 in Martin	1983	current	
SR 217	2.9	4.7	SR 22 in Dresden	SR 89 near Dresden	1983	current	
SR 218	26.2	42.2	US 641/SR 54 near Paris	SR 140 in Buchanan	1983	current	
SR 219	4.0	6.4	US 70/SR 1 near Huntingdon	SR 77 near Huntingdon	1983	current	
SR 220	14.2	22.9	US 70/SR 1 near Cedar Grove	US 70A/US 79/SR 76/SR 77 in Atwood	1983	current	
SR 220A	1.5	2.4	SR 220 in Atwood	US 70A/SR 77 in Atwood	c. 1995	current	
SR 221	7.4	11.9	SR 54/SR 88 in Alamo	US 70A/US 79/SR 76 in Gadsden	1983	current	
SR 222	12.9	20.8	SR 59 near Somerville	US 70/US 79/SR 1 in Stanton	1983	current	
SR 223	15.1	24.3	SR 138 near Mercer	I-40 in Jackson	1983	current	
SR 224	26.6	42.8	SR 22 in Michie	SR 22A in Enville	1983	current	
SR 225	17.1	27.5	SR 100 near Henderson	US 64/SR 15 near Selmer	1983	current	
SR 226	7.0	11.3	SR 128 near Walkertown	US 64/SR 15/SR 128 in Olivet	1983	current	
SR 227	32.3	52.0	SR 157 at the Alabama state line near Cypress Inn	SR 101 at the Alabama state line near Loretto	1983	current	
SR 228	—	—	SR 128 in Clifton	SR 13 near Bethel	1983	c. 1987	
SR 228	11.1	17.9	SR 128 in Clifton	SR 13 near Waynesboro	c. 1987	current	
SR 229	1.8	2.9	At Turney Center Industrial Complex	SR 50 in Only	1983	current	Provides access to Turney Center Industrial Complex
SR 230	34.54	55.59	SR 13 in Waverly	SR 50 near Littlelot	1983	current	
SR 231	13.7	22.0	US 70/SR 1 in McEwen	SR 13 near Erin	1983	current	
SR 232	13.6	21.9	SR 147 in McKinnon	US 79/SR 76 in Dover	1983	current	
SR 233	23.7	38.1	SR 49 in Carlisle	US 79/SR 76 near Woodlawn	1983	current	
SR 234	6.7	10.8	CR 700 at Mississippi State Line near Chewalla	SR 57 in Ramer	1983	current	
SR 235	27.3	43.9	US 70/SR 1 in Dickson	SR 13 near Cunningham	1983	current	
SR 236	6.7	10.8	US 41A/SR 13 in Clarksville	SR 48 in Clarksville	1983	current	Tiny Town Road
SR 237	7.9	12.7	SR 374 in Clarksville	SR 48 near Clarksville	1983	current	Rossview Road
SR 238	8.2	13.2	SR 76 in Port Royal	KY 2128 at Kentucky State Line near Guthrie	1983	current	Port Royal Road
SR 239	0.72	1.16	SR 22 in Dresden	SR 89 in Dresden	1983	current	
SR 240	17.2	27.7	US 64/SR 15 near Lawrenceburg	US 43/SR 6 near Summertown	1983	current	
SR 241	12.0	19.3	US 64/SR 15 near Lawrenceburg	Natchez Trace Parkway at Laurel Hill Wildlife Management Area	1983	current	
SR 242	36.7	59.1	SR 227 in Iron City	SR 240 in Henryville	1983	current	
SR 243	12.9	20.8	US 43/SR 6 in Mount Pleasant	US 412 Bus./SR 99 in Columbia	1983	current	
SR 244	9.1	14.6	US 64/SR 15 in Boonshill	US 431/SR 50 near Petersburg	1983	current	
SR 245	18.6	29.9	SR 166 near Campbellsville	SR 50 in Columbia	1983	current	
SR 246	21.7	34.9	US 31/SR 6 in Columbia	US 31/SR 6 in Franklin	1983	current	
SR 247	26.4	42.5	SR 50 in Williamsport	US 431/SR 106 in Duplex	1983	current	
SR 248	3.7	6.0	US 31/SR 6 near Thompson's Station	I-65 in Franklin	1983	current	
SR 249	29.6	47.6	I-40 near Pegram	I-24 near Joelton	1983	current	
SR 250	13.83	22.26	SR 47 near White Bluff	SR 49 near Ashland City	1983	current	
SR 251	15.7	25.3	SR 249 near Ashland City	US 70S/SR 1 in Bellevue	1983	current	
SR 252	13.4	21.6	SR 96 in Arrington	US 31/SR 6 in Brentwood	1983	current	
SR 253	7.3	11.7	US 31/SR 6 in Brentwood	US 31A/US 41A/SR 11 near Nolensville	1983	current	
SR 254	17.3	27.8	SR 100 in Bellevue	US 41/US 70S/SR 1 in Antioch	1983	current	
SR 255	11.2	18.0	US 31/SR 6 in Oak Hill	US 70/SR 24 in Donelson	1983	current	
SR 256	10.6	17.1	US 41A/SR 112 near Pleasant View	SR 76 in Adams	1983	current	
SR 257	18.3	29.5	SR 49 in Coopertown	US 31W/SR 41 in Millersville	1983	current	
SR 258	14.1	22.7	US 31E/SR 6 in Hendersonville	SR 76 in White House	1983	current	
SR 259	12.9	20.8	US 31W/SR 41 near Portland	SR 52 in Oak Grove	1983	current	
SR 260	5.6	9.0	US 231/SR 376 in Trousdale County	SR 141 near Hartsville	1983	current	
SR 261	13.2	21.2	SR 52 in Lafayette	KY 87 at Kentucky State Line	1983	current	
SR 262	25.17	40.51	SR 52 in Lafayette	SR 53 in Gainesboro	1983	current	
SR 263	5.1	8.2	SR 25 in Carthage	SR 85 near Defeated	1983	current	
SR 264	16.5	26.6	SR 96 near Dowelltown	US 70N/SR 24/SR 53 in Elmwood	1983	current	
SR 265	24.97	40.19	SR 45 in Hermitage	US 70/SR 26 near Watertown	1983	current	
SR 266	39.81	64.07	I-24 in Smyrna	US 70/SR 26 in Lebanon	1983	current	
SR 267	10.8	17.4	SR 96 in Prosperity	US 70/SR 26 in Watertown	1983	current	
SR 268	7.41	11.93	US 41/US 70S/SR 1 in Murfreesboro	SR 96 near Murfreesboro	1983	current	
SR 269	49.2	79.2	US 31A/SR 11 in Allisona	US 41A/SR 16 in Tullahoma	1983	current	
SR 270	9.5	15.3	US 31A/SR 11/SR 99 in Chapel Hill	US 41A/SR 16 near Unionville	1983	current	
SR 271	6.3	10.1	US 431/SR 50 in Belfast	US 31A/SR 11/SR 64 in Farmington	1983	current	
SR 272	22.4	36.0	SR 129 in Archer	SR 99 near Chapel Hill	1983	current	
SR 273	36.9	59.4	SR 166 near Prospect	US 64 Byp./US 231/US 431/SR 10 in Fayetteville	1983	current	
SR 274	13.1	21.1	CR 11 at Alabama state line near Taft	SR 273 near Fayetteville	1983	current	
SR 275	14.1	22.7	US 231/US 431/SR 10 in Park City	US 64/SR 15 near Flintville	1983	current	
SR 276	3.2	5.1	SR 130 in Raus	US 41A/SR 16 near Normandy	1983	current	
SR 277	3.17	5.10	US 78/SR 4 in Memphis	US 64/US 70/US 79/SR 1/SR 57 in Memphis	1983	current	
SR 278	1.8	2.9	US 64/US 70/US 79/SR 1/SR 14 in Memphis	US 78/SR 4 in Memphis	1983	current	Unsigned companion route for US 78
SR 279	5.3	8.5	US 41A/SR 16 in Estill Springs	SR 127 near Estill Springs	1983	current	
SR 280	10.6	17.1	US 41/SR 2 in Beechgrove	SR 53 in Pocahontas	1983	current	
SR 281	6.1	9.8	SR 53 near Iconium	SR 146 in Center Hill	1983	current	
SR 282	3.7	6.0	At Lake Tansi Village	SR 101 near Crossville	1983	current	
SR 283	13.6	21.9	SR 28 in Whitwell	US 127/SR 8 near Dunlap	1983	current	
SR 284	15.3	24.6	SR 111 near Fall Creek Falls State Park	SR 30 near Fall Creek Falls State Park	1983	current	
SR 285	27.4	44.1	US 70S/SR 1 in Doyle	SR 101 near Mount Crest	1983	current	
SR 286	2.8	4.5	SR 55 Bus. in McMinnville	SR 380 in McMinnville	1983	current	
SR 287	40.5	65.2	SR 108/SR 127 near Viola	SR 136 in Rock Island	1983	current	
SR 288	17.8	28.6	US 70S/SR 1 near McMinnville	SR 56 near Smithville	1983	current	
SR 289	2.63	4.23	US 70/SR 1 in Sparta	SR 111 in Sparta	1983	current	
SR 290	20.1	32.3	SR 53 near Granville	SR 135 in Cookeville	1983	current	
SR 291	2.0	3.2	SR 56 in Bloomington Springs	US 70N/SR 24 in Double Springs	1983	current	
SR 292	9.9	15.9	SR 53 at Butlers Landing	SR 136 in Hilham	1983	current	
SR 293	11.3	18.2	SR 136 near Bangham	SR 84 near Livingston	1983	current	
SR 294	20.2	32.5	SR 52/SR 85 in Livingston	At Dale Hollow Reservoir	1983	current	
SR 295	5.0	8.0	SR 111 in Byrdstown	US 127/SR 28 near Pall Mall	1983	current	
SR 296	3.0	4.8	US 127/SR 28 near Jamestown	SR 52 in Allardt	1983	current	
SR 297	63.2	101.7	SR 154 in Sharp Place	US 25W/SR 9 in Jellico	1983	current	
SR 298	25.8	41.5	US 127/SR 28 in Crossville	SR 62 near Lancing	1983	current	
SR 299	17.6	28.3	US 70/SR 1 in Westel	SR 328 in Oakdale	1983	current	
SR 300	1.46	2.35	US 51/SR 3 in Memphis	I-40 in Memphis	1978	current	
SR 301	0.9	1.4	SR 285 near Mount Crest	At Taft Youth Center	1983	current	Provides access to Taft Youth Center
SR 302	13.3	21.4	SR 30 in Old Washington	US 27/SR 29 in Spring City	1983	current	
SR 303	5.7	9.2	US 27/SR 29 in Graysville	SR 30 near Dayton	1983	current	
SR 304	30.0	48.3	SR 58 in Decatur	SR 58 near Kingston	1983	current	
SR 305	13.7	22.0	SR 30/SR 39 in Athens	SR 68 near Ten Mile	1983	current	
SR 306	11.1	17.9	SR 60 in Hopewell	SR 58 in Brittsville	1983	current	
SR 307	10.9	17.5	SR 30/SR 39 in Athens	SR 68 near Sweetwater	1983	current	
SR 308	7.5	12.1	SR 306 near Hopewell	US 11/SR 2 in Charleston	1983	current	
SR 309	2.6	4.2	I-75 near Niota	US 11/SR 2 in Niota	1983	current	
SR 310	6.3	10.1	US 411/SR 30/SR 33 in Etowah	SR 39 in Mecca	1983	current	
SR 311	6.3	10.1	I-75/US 74 in Cleveland	US 64/US 74/SR 60 in Cleveland	1983	current	Unsigned companion route for US 64/US 74
SR 312	26.8	43.1	SR 60 in Birchwood	US 11/US 64/SR 40/SR 74 in Cleveland	1983	current	
SR 313	7.7	12.4	SR 74 in Wildwood Lake	US 411/SR 33 in Old Fort	1983	current	
SR 314	6.1	9.8	US 64/US 74/SR 40 in Parksville	US 411/SR 33 in Benton	1983	current	
SR 315	15.0	24.1	SR 30 in Reliance	SR 39 in Jalapa	1983	current	
SR 316	0.4	0.64	I-124/US 27/SR 27/SR 29 in Chattanooga	SR 2 in Chattanooga	1983	current	Also known as M. L. K. Boulevard
SR 317	21.3	34.3	SR 17 in Chattanooga	SR 60 at Red Clay State Park	1983	current	
SR 318	1.05	1.69	US 11/US 41/US 64/US 72/SR 2 in Chattanooga	SR 148 in Chattanooga	1983	current	
SR 319	22.2	35.7	SR 153 in Chattanooga	US 27/SR 29 in Soddy-Daisy	1983	current	
SR 320	7.3	11.7	US 11/US 64/SR 2 in Chattanooga	SR 321 in East Brainerd	1983	current	
SR 321	7.1	11.4	SR 151 at the Georgia state line	US 11/US 64/SR 2 in Ooltewah	1983	current	
SR 322	22.0	35.4	SR 72 in Paint Rock	SR 72 in Vonore	1983	current	
SR 323	2.2	3.5	I-75 near Philadelphia	US 11/SR 2 in Philadelphia	1983	current	
SR 324	2.3	3.7	I-75 near Loudon	US 11/SR 2 in Loudon	1983	current	
SR 325	18.3	29.5	At Dale Hollow Lake	US 127/SR 28 near Pall Mall	1983	current	
SR 326	1.3	2.1	US 70/SR 1 near Kingston	I-40/SR 58 in Kingston	1983	current	
SR 327	5.7	9.2	SR 58 in Oak Ridge	SR 61 in Blair	1983	current	
SR 328	8.2	13.2	US 27/SR 29/SR 61 in Harriman	US 27/SR 29 near Harriman	1983	current	
SR 329	9.2	14.8	SR 62 near Deer Lodge	US 27/SR 29 in Sunbright	1983	current	
SR 330	9.1	14.6	SR 61/SR 62 in Oliver Springs	SR 116 in Laurel Grove	1983	current	
SR 331	15.4	24.8	US 441/SR 33/SR 71 in Fountain City	SR 61 near Blaine	1983	current	
SR 332	14.23	22.90	US 11/US 70/SR 1 in Farragut	I-40/I-75 in Knoxville	1983	current	
SR 333	14.49	23.32	US 321/SR 73 in Friendsville	US 129/SR 115 near Alcoa	1983	current	Topside Road
SR 334	2.5	4.0	SR 335 in Alcoa	SR 333 in Louisville	1983	current	Louisville Road
SR 335	11.0	17.7	US 129/US 411/SR 33/SR 115 in Maryville	SR 33 in Eagleton Village	1983	current	Hunt Road/Old Glory Road/William Blount Drive
SR 336	19.6	31.5	US 411/SR 33 near Greenback	US 321/SR 73 in Maryville	1983	current	Brick Mill Road/6 Mile Road/Montvale Road
SR 337	1.6	2.6	US 321/SR 73 in Townsend	Great Smoky Mountains National Park	1983	current	Displayed as SR 73 Scenic
SR 338	20.2	32.5	US 411/US 441/SR 35/SR 71 in Seymour	SR 139 near Sevierville	1983	current	
SR 339	23.1	37.2	US 411/SR 35 in Cherokee Hills	US 321/SR 32/SR 73 in Cosby	1983	current	
SR 340	25.9	41.7	US 25/US 70/SR 9 near Del Rio	SR 113 near Morristown	1983	current	
SR 341	10.4	16.7	US 11E/SR 34 in Talbott	US 25E/SR 32 in White Pine	1983	current	
SR 342	7.5	12.1	At Panther Creek State Park	US 11ESR 34 near Morristown	1983	current	Unsigned as of 2020
SR 343	7.7	12.4	US 25E/SR 32/SR 113 in Morristown	US 25E/SR 32 in Morristown	1983	current	
SR 344	13.5	21.7	US 11E/SR 34/SR 66 in Russellville	US 11W/SR 1 near Rogersville	1983	current	
SR 345	8.5	13.7	US 25E/SR 32 in Tazewell	SR 63 near Hopewell	1983	current	
SR 346	24.3	39.1	US 11W/SR 1 in Surgoinsville	US 23/SR 36/SR 137 in Kingsport	1983	current	
SR 347	31.3	50.4	US 11W/SR 1/SR 70 in Rogersville	I-26/US 23 in Kingsport	1983	current	
SR 348	12.0	19.3	SR 340 near Warrensburg	US 11E/SR 34 in Mosheim	1983	current	
SR 349	13.4	21.6	SR 340 near Warrensburg	US 321/SR 35 near Greeneville	1983	current	
SR 350	7.5	12.1	SR 351 near Camp Creek	US 11E/US 321 TruckSR 34/SR 70 in Greeneville	1983	current	
SR 351	25.4	40.9	SR 70/SR 107 near South Greene	SR 93 in Newmansville	1983	current	
SR 352	10.3	16.6	NC 212 at North Carolina state line	US 19W/SR 36 in Temple Hill	1983	current	
SR 353	13.3	21.4	SR 107 in South Central	SR 81 in Jonesborough	1983	current	
SR 354	7.4	11.9	US 11E/US 321/SR 34 in Jonesborough	SR 36 in Boones Creek	1983	current	
SR 355	2.58	4.15	SR 126 in Kingsport	SR 36 in Kingsport	1983	current	
SR 356	0.95	1.53	US 641/SR 54/SR 69 in Paris	US 79/SR 76 in Paris	1983	current	
SR 357	2.7	4.3	I-81 in Kingsport	SR 75 in Blountville	1983	current	
SR 358	9.4	15.1	SR 44 near Bluff City	US 11E/US 19/SR 34 in Bristol	1983	current	
SR 359	4.9	7.9	I-26/US 19W/US 23 in Johnson City	US 321/SR 67 in Elizabethton	1983	current	
SR 360	22.1	35.6	SR 165 in Tellico Plains	US 411/SR 33/SR 72 in Vonore	1983	current	
SR 361	8.8	14.2	SR 359 in Pine Crest	US 19E/SR 37 in Hampton	1983	current	
SR 362	5.7	9.2	SR 361 near Elizabethton	US 321/SR 67/SR 91 in Elizabethton	1983	current	
SR 363	6.0	9.7	SR 92 near Chestnut Hill	US 25W/US 70/SR 9 in Reidtown	1983	current	
SR 364	3.28	5.28	US 70/SR 22 in Huntingdon	US 70A/SR 77 in Huntingdon	1983	current	Unsigned companion route for US 70A in Huntingdon
SR 365	3.58	5.76	US 45/SR 5 in Henderson	US 45/SR 5 in Henderson	1983	current	
SR 366	5.48	8.82	US 70A/US 79/SR 76 in Humboldt	US 45W/SR 5 in Humboldt	1983	current	Unsigned companion route for the US 45W/US 70A/US 79 Bypass in Humboldt
SR 367	4.80	7.72	US 45W/SR 5/SR 457 in Trenton	US 45W/SR 5/SR 77 in Trenton	1983	current	
SR 368	1.7	2.7	SR 57 in Grand Junction	SR 18 near Grand Junction	1983	current	
SR 369	1.11	1.79	SR 54 in Brownsville	US 70A/US 79/SR 76 in Brownsville	1983	current	
SR 370	5.8	9.3	SR 144 near Plainview	SR 61 near Maynardville	1983	current	
SR 371	4.87	7.84	SR 87 in Cherry	SR 87 near Glimp	1983	current	
SR 372	6.0	9.7	US 45E/SR 43/SR 216 in Martin	US 45E/SR 43 in Martin	1983	current	
SR 373	17.1	27.5	SR 50 near Culleoka	US 31A Bus./US 431 Bus./SR 11/SR 50 in Lewisburg	1983	current	
SR 374	16.2	26.1	US 79/SR 76 in Clarksville	US 41A/SR 76/SR 112 in Clarksville	1983	current	Planned to be extended down to SR 149 in future.
SR 375	18.0	29.0	SR 92 in Cherokee	US 25E/SR 32 in Bean Station	1983	current	
SR 376	7.8	12.6	US 231/SR 10/SR 25 near Hartsville	US 31E/US 231/SR 6 in Bransford	1983	current	Unsigned companion route for US 231
SR 377	1.2	1.9	SR 73 at Alabama state line	SR 156 in New Hope	1983	current	
SR 378	1.94	3.12	US 27/SR 29/SR 60 in Dayton	US 27/SR 29 in Dayton	1983	current	
SR 379	1.82	2.93	SR 55 in Morrison	SR 55 in Morrison	1983	current	
SR 380	4.21	6.78	US 70S/SR 1/SR 55 in McMinnville	US 70S/SR 1 in McMinnville	1983	current	
SR 381	7.63	12.28	US 321/SR 67 in Johnson City	US 11E/US 19W/SR 34 in Johnson City	1983	current	
SR 382	1.2	1.9	US 70/SR 1/SR 29 near Rockwood	US 27/SR 61 in Cardiff	1983	current	
SR 383	1.0	1.6	US 25E/US 58/SR 32 in Cumberland Gap	US 58 at Virginia state line	1995	current	Unsigned companion route for US 58
SR 384	11.3	18.2	SR 14 near Covington	US 51/SR 3 in Covington	1983	current	
SR 385	15.44	24.85	I-240 in Memphis	I-269 in Collierville	1983	current	Southern segment
SR 385	16.87	27.15	US 51 in Millington	I-40/I-269 in Arlington	1983	current	Northern segment
SR 386	17.3	27.8	I-65 in Nashville	US 31E/SR 6/SR 25/SR 174 in Gallatin	1983	current	
SR 387	1.53	2.46	US 231/US 231 Bus./SR 10/SR 64/SR 130 in Shelbyville	US 231/SR 10/SR 82 in Shelbyville	1983	current	Unsigned companion route for US 231 in Shelbyville
SR 388	6.8	10.9	US 51/SR 3 in Memphis	At Meeman-Shelby Forest State Park	1983	current	
SR 389	0.3	0.48	I-124/US 27/SR 27 in Chattanooga	SR 8 in Chattanooga	1983	current	Locally known as 4th Street
SR 390	2.6	4.2	SR 44 in Bluff City	US 11E/US 19/SR 34/SR 394 in Bristol	1986	current	
SR 391	5.2	8.4	US 70/SR 1 in Camden	US 70/SR 1 in Camden	1986	current	
SR 392	5.2	8.4	US 127/SR 28 in Crossville	US 70/SR 1/SR 101 in Crossville	1986	current	
SR 393	3.5	5.6	US 51 near Fowlkes	US 412 near Dyersburg	1986	—	Proposed by 1986 but never built; shown in the document as TN 399, which was probably not the designation for this road because the current one was created around the same time
SR 394	15.7	25.3	US 11W/SR 1 in Blountville	US 421/SR 34/SR 435 in Bristol	1986	current	
SR 395	6.1	9.8	SR 107 in Erwin	NC 197 at the North Carolina state line	1986	current	
SR 396	4.75	7.64	US 31/SR 6 in Spring Hill	I-65 near Spring Hill	1986	current	Also known as Saturn Parkway
SR 397	7.4	11.9	US 31/SR 6 in Franklin	US 431/SR 106 in Franklin	1986	current	
SR 398	9.8	15.8	Wartrace	I-24 near Busy Corner	1986	—	Proposed by 1986 but never built
SR 399	10.6	17.1	SR 108 on the Gruetli-Laager-Palmer city line	SR 8/SR 111 in Cagle	1987	current	
SR 400	10.9	17.5	SR 91 in Johnson City	US 321/SR 67 in Elizabethton	1986	current	
SR 416	14.5	23.3	US 321/SR 73 in Pittman Center	US 411/SR 35 in Sevierville	1987	current	
SR 417	1.90	3.06	SR 373 in Lewisburg	US 431/SR 50/SR 106 in Lewisburg	1987	current	
SR 418	0.87	1.40	US 421/SR 34/SR 67 in Mountain City	US 421/SR 34/SR 67 in Mountain City	1987	current	
SR 419	4.0	6.4	SR 101 near Crossville	US 127/SR 28 at Cumberland Mountain State Park	1987	current	
SR 420	4.7	7.6	US 45W/SR 5 in Fruitland	SR 186 in Gibson	1987	current	
SR 421	5.4	8.7	SR 69 in Lebanon	SR 104/SR 201 in Sardis	1987	current	
SR 422	2.38	3.83	Jackson County, Alabama CR 93 at Alabama state line	SR 156 in New Hope	1987	current	
SR 423	10.8	17.4	US 79/SR 76 in McKenzie	SR 77 in Mixie	1987	current	
SR 424	17.3	27.8	US 70/SR 1 near Cedar Grove	SR 114 in Yuma	1987	current	
SR 425	2.14	3.44	US 45E/SR 43 in Milan	US 70A/US 79/SR 76 in Milan	1987	current	
SR 429	1.85	2.98	Tennessee Air National Guard Base in Alcoa	US 129/SR 115 in Alcoa	1987	2009	Decommissioned when the Tennessee Air National Guard Base moved its security gate, making the road private
SR 431	16.58	26.68	US 51/SR 3/SR 184 in Union City	US 45E/SR 22/SR 216 in Martin	1989	current	
SR 433	8.2	13.2	US 64/SR 15/SR 16 in Winchester	US 64/SR 50 in Decherd	1995	current	Unsigned companion route for US 64 around Winchester
SR 434	0.5	0.80	SR 46/SR 233 in Cumberland City	SR 149 in Cumberland City	1989	current	
SR 435	4.2	6.8	US 421/SR 34/SR 394 in Bristol	US 421/SR 34/SR 44 in Holston Valley	1990	current	
SR 436	9.8	15.8	US 70A/SR 77 near McLemoresville	US 79/SR 76 in McKenzie	1990	current	
SR 437	6.4	10.3	US 231/SR 10 in Shelbyville	US 41A/SR 16 in Shelbyville	2011	current	
SR 438	41.0	66.0	US 412/SR 20/SR 100 near Perryville	SR 50 near Centerville	1995	current	
SR 441	3.7	6.0	US 31/SR 6 in Franklin	SR 252 in Brentwood	1995	current	
SR 443	12.2	19.6	SR 30 in Summer City	SR 30 near Dayton	1995	current	
SR 444	11.1	17.9	SR 72 near Vonore	US 321/SR 73/SR 95 in Lenoir City	1995	current	
SR 445	12.6	20.3	SR 105 near Rutherford	US 45E/SR 43 in Greenfield	1995	current	
SR 446	0.30	0.48	US 321/SR 73 in Maryville	US 129/SR 115 in Maryville	1995	current	
SR 447	0.16	0.26	US 321/SR 73 in Maryville	US 411/SR 35 in Maryville	1995	current	
SR 448	0.63	1.01	US 411/SR 35 in Sevierville	SR 66 in Sevierville	2004	current	
SR 449	6.20	9.98	US 321/US 441/SR 71/SR 73 in Pigeon Forge	US 411/SR 35 in Sevierville	2007	current	
SR 450	0.3	0.48	US 11/US 70/SR 1/SR 158 in Knoxville	Volunteer Boulevard at University of Tennessee	2002	current	Route unsigned, known as Joe Johnson Drive
SR 451	—	—	—	—	proposed	—	Proposed Corridor J1 in Putnam and Jackson counties
SR 452	4.6	7.4	I-840 near Smyrna	US 231/SR 10 in Vine	2002	current	
SR 454	6.2	10.0	US 321/SR 73 on the Gatlinburg–Pittman Center city line	SR 416 near Sevierville	2002	current	
SR 455	1.9	3.1	SR 12 in Ashland City	SR 12 in Ashland City	2006	current	Tennessee Waltz Parkway
SR 456	10.0	16.1	US 27/SR 29 in Oneida	SR 63/SR 297 near Huntsville	2002	current	
SR 457	4.0	6.4	US 45W/SR 5/SR 367 in Trenton	SR 104 near Trenton	2002	current	
SR 458	—	—	Beltway around Bolivar		proposed	—	
SR 459	4.9	7.9	Beltway around Lexington		2023	current	Southeast section still not built
SR 460	—	—	Beltway around Somerville		proposed	—	
SR 461	3.1	5.0	US 76/SR 79 near Dover	The Trace at Land Between the Lakes National Recreation Area	2007	current	Provides access to The Trace
SR 462	2.1	3.4	US 70/SR 1 near Crossville	US 70N/SR 24 near Crossville	2014	current	
SR 468	—	—	Proposed thoroughfare route for Blue Oval City in Haywood County		proposed	—	
SR 473	0.2	0.32	Virginia state line	US 421/SR 34 in Bristol	2008	2011	Former portion of SR 34; decommissioned when US 421 was rerouted off of this road; now MLK Jr Boulevard; still on official maps through 2017, but off functional maps by 2014
SR 474	1.4	2.3	SR 160 southwest of Morristown	US 11E/SR 34 in Morristown	2006	2020	Removed following completion of SR 66 relocation project in 2020.
SR 475	—	—	I-40/I-75 near Lenoir City	I-75 near Heiskell	1995	2010	Proposed I-75 bypass of Knoxville, also proposed to be extended to I-40 at exit 407 (SR 66) to provide a complete northern beltway of Knoxville and provide a more direct route to Sevier County/Great Smoky Mountains National Park
SR 476	11.8	19.0	SR 50 in Broadview	SR 130 south of Tullahoma	2007	current	Provides access to Tims Ford State Park
SR 477	5.4	8.7	SR 290 in Bloomington Springs	SR 135 near Dodson Branch	2011	current	Provides access to Cummins Falls State Park
SR 690	—	—	US 51 south of Union City	US 51/US 45W north of Union City	2024	current	State route placeholder for I-69
SR 840	77.28	124.37	I-40 near Dickson	I-40 near Lebanon	1991	2016	Now I-840

== See also ==
- List of state routes in Tennessee shorter than one mile
- List of special state routes in Tennessee
