= Tennessee State Route 435 =

State highway in Tennessee, United States

State Route 435
- Bristol Caverns Highway
- TN 435 highlighted in red

Route information
- Maintained by TDOT
- Length: 4.2 mi (6.8 km)

Major junctions
- South end: US 421 / SR 394 in Bristol
- North end: US 421 / SR 44 in Holston Valley

Location
- Country: United States
- State: Tennessee
- Counties: Sullivan

Highway system
- Tennessee State Routes; Interstate; US; State
← SR 434	→ SR 436

State Route 435 (SR 435) is a state highway in Sullivan County, Tennessee, that provides access to the Bristol Caverns.

== Route description ==
SR 435 begins at an intersection with US 421 and SR 394. It heads in southeasterly direction and passes Bristol Caverns and finally comes to an end at US 421/SR 44. The entire route is a rural 2-lane highway as it does follow the former alignment of US 421 before the current 4-lane divided highway was built to the south.

== Junction list ==
The entire route is in Sullivan County.

Location	mi	km	Destinations	Notes
Bristol	0.0	0.0	US 421 (Carl Moore Parkway/SR 34) / SR 394 west – Bristol, Blountville	Southern terminus of SR 435; Eastern terminus of SR 394
Holston Valley	4.2	6.8	US 421 / SR 44 (SR 34) – Mountain City	Northern terminus
1.000 mi = 1.609 km; 1.000 km = 0.621 mi
