= Tennessee State Route 394 =

State highway in Tennessee, United States

State Route 394
- TN 394 highlighted in red

Route information
- Maintained by TDOT
- Length: 15.7 mi (25.3 km)

Major junctions
- West end: US 11W in Blountville
- I-81 in Blountville; US 11E / US 19 in Bristol
- East end: US 421 / SR 435 in Bristol

Location
- Country: United States
- State: Tennessee
- Counties: Sullivan

Highway system
- Tennessee State Routes; Interstate; US; State
← SR 392	→ SR 395

State Route 394 (SR 394) is a west–east state highway in Sullivan County, Tennessee. It serves as southern bypass of Bristol and as a connector route from Interstate 81 (I-81) to Bristol Motor Speedway. The western terminus is at an intersection with U.S. Route 11W (US 11W) northwest of Blountville and the eastern terminus is at a junction with US 421 southeast of Bristol. The route heads southeast and crosses I-81 before passing through Blountville. From here, SR 394 continues southeast to an interchange with US 11E/US 19 near Bristol Motor Speedway, which turns northeast and continues to US 421.

== Route description ==
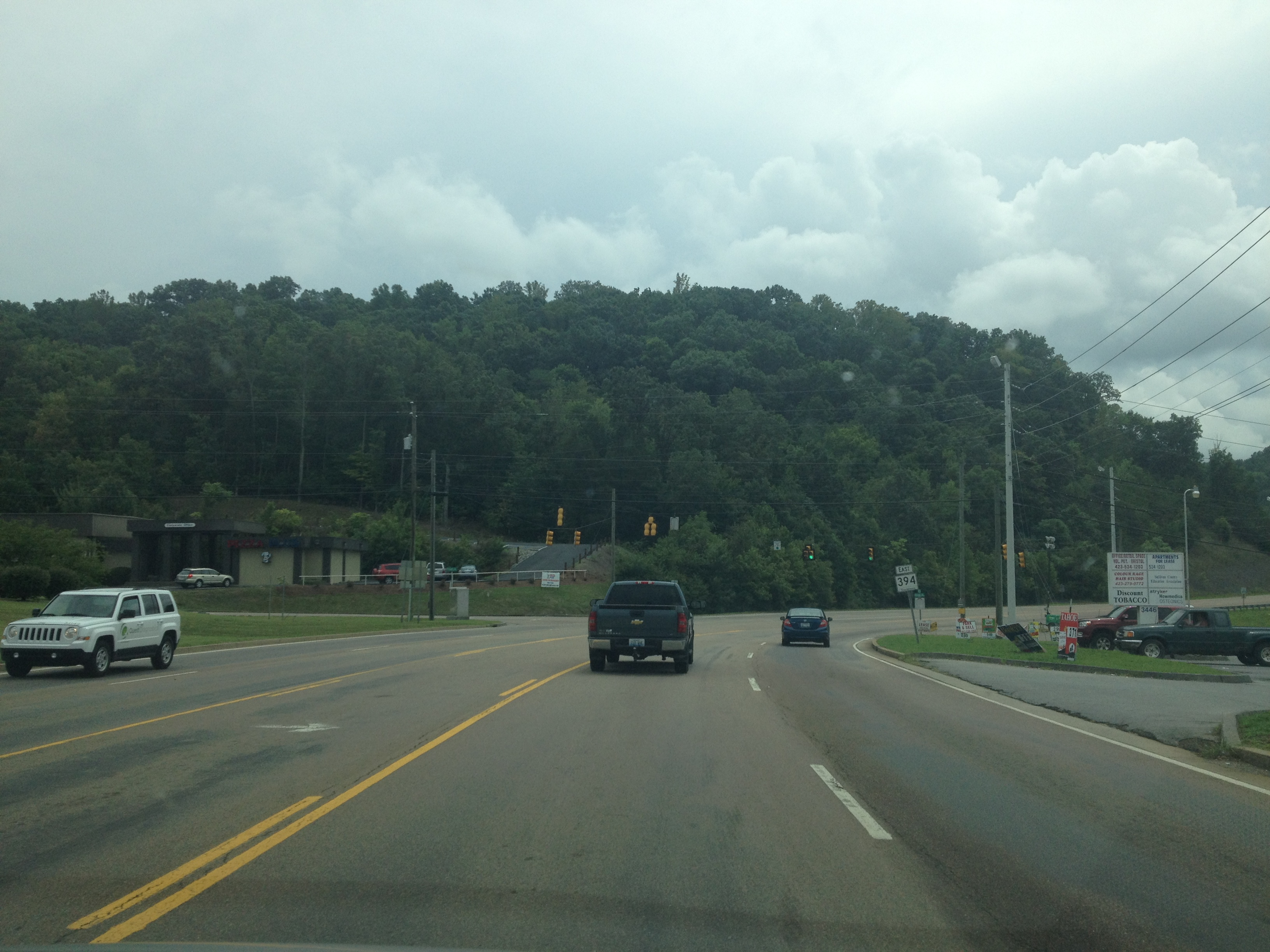
SR 394 eastbound past SR 126 in Blountville

SR 394 begins at an intersection with US 11W (SR 1) in unincorporated northern Sullivan County, heading southeast as a two-lane undivided road that is a secondary state route. The road winds through hilly areas of fields and woods with a few homes. Farther southeast, the route enters Blountville, which widens to a four-lane divided highway and comes to an interchange with I-81. At this interchange, SR 394 becomes a primary state route. After I-81, the road passes a few businesses and becomes a five-lane road with a center left-turn lane, running through farm fields and woodland. The route curves south and comes to a junction with SR 126 in a commercial area west of downtown Blountville. Past here, SR 394 leaves Blountville and winds south through wooded mountains, turning to the east. The road runs through a retail area before it passes more woods and fields with some nearby development. The route heads past a mix of residential development and farmland before it passes southwest of the former Exide Technologies and turns to the southeast. SR 394 runs through an area of woods before it passes through fields. Farther along, the route passes through residential areas with some businesses. The road curves east and comes to an interchange with US 11E/US 19 (SR 34) to the south of Bristol.

At this interchange, SR 394 becomes concurrent with SR 390 for a short distance before that route splits and turns south toward Bluff City. From here, the route becomes a four-lane divided highway and heads northeast, passing to the south of Bristol Motor Speedway and Bristol Dragway and running between campgrounds and parking areas belonging to the race track. The road heads into hilly areas and runs between wooded areas to the north and farm fields to the south. SR 394 runs through more woodland and curves east, with an access road connecting to Vance Tank Road. The route passes over Vance Tank Road and Norfolk Southern's Knoxville East District railroad line and heads east through fields before curving northeast and running through woodland with some fields. The road comes to an interchange with SR 358 and turns north through forested areas. SR 394 curves east and comes to its terminus at an intersection with US 421 (SR 34) southeast of Bristol, where the road continues east as SR 435 northbound, a secondary state route.

== Junction list ==
The entire route is in Sullivan County.

Location	mi	km	Destinations	Notes
Blountville	0.0	0.0	US 11W (Lee Highway/SR 1) – Bristol, Kingsport	Western terminus
Blountville	2.7	4.3	I-81 – Bristol, Knoxville	I-81 exit 69; SR 394 becomes a Primary Highway
Blountville	3.5	5.6	SR 126 Truck east (Blountville Bypass)	Eastern end of concurrency with Truck Route 126
Blountville	3.7	6.0	SR 126 (Bristol Highway) – Bristol, Kingsport	Western terminus of SR-126 Truck Route; To Tri-Cities Regional Airport
Bristol	8.0	12.9	US 11E / US 19 (SR 34) – Bristol, Piney Flats, Johnson City	Interchange; access to Bristol Motor Speedway; Northern terminus of SR 390
Bristol	8.3	13.4	SR 390 south (Bluff City Highway) – Bluff City	Eastern end of SR 390 concurrency
Bristol	14.0	22.5	SR 358 (Weaver Pike) – Bristol	Interchange
Bristol	15.7	25.3	US 421 (Carl Moore Parkway/SR 34) – Bristol, Shady Valley, Mountain City SR 435 north (Bristol Caverns Highway) – Bristol Caverns	Eastern terminus of SR 394 and southern terminus of SR 435; road continues eastward as SR 435; also access to South Holston Lake
1.000 mi = 1.609 km; 1.000 km = 0.621 mi
