= Bob Hogsett =

American basketball player and coach (1941–1984)

Personal information
- Born: January 29, 1941
- Died: December 5, 1984 (aged 43) Blacksburg, Virginia, U.S.
- Listed height: 6 ft 7 in (2.01 m)
- Listed weight: 230 lb (104 kg)

Career information
- High school: Holston Valley (Holston Valley, Tennessee)
- College: Tennessee (1963–1966)
- NBA draft: 1966: undrafted
- Position: Power forward
- Number: 20, 12
- Coaching career: 1970–1973

Career history

Playing
- 1966–1967: Lansing Capitals
- 1967: Detroit Pistons
- 1967: Pittsburgh Pipers

Coaching
- 1970–1973: Francis Marion
- Stats at NBA.com
- Stats at Basketball Reference

Robert L. "Bobby" Hogsett (January 29, 1941 – December 5, 1984) was an American professional basketball player and coach. He played college basketball for the Tennessee Volunteers then professionally for the Detroit Pistons and Pittsburgh Pipers. After his playing career, Hogsett served as a high school and collegiate head coach including for the Francis Marion Patriots from 1970 to 1973. Hogsett was working as an administrator at Virginia Tech in 1984 when he was fatally shot on campus by a carpenter.

== Early life ==
Hogsett was raised in Holston Valley, Tennessee, by his parents Charles and Ruth Hogsett. His father worked as a refrigeration engineer and maintenance supervisor. Hogsett attended Holston Valley High School.

== Basketball career ==
Hogsett played college basketball for the Tennessee Volunteers but was kept on the bench for extended periods by head coach Ray Mears. He tried out for the Detroit Pistons of the NBA after graduation and made the team. Hogsett also played professionally for the Lansing Capitals of the North American Basketball League (NABL) and the Pittsburgh Pipers of the American Basketball Association (ABA). Hogsett played professional basketball for four years.

== Post-playing career ==
After his playing career, Hogsett worked as a high school and college basketball coach. Hogsett served as the head coach of the Francis Marion Patriots men's basketball team from 1970 to 1973 and amassed a 10–56 record. He earned a doctorate while coaching. Hogsett taught health and physical education at Radford University before he joined the Foundation for Appropriate Medical Care in Salem, Virginia, in 1980. In 1983, Hogsett was hired by Virginia Tech to work as an administrator at the Veterinary Medical Teaching Hospital, where he was responsible for non-clinical hospital operations.

== Death ==
On December 5, 1984, Hogsett was confronted by Virginia Tech carpenter Louis Dowdy outside the veterinary school administration building. Dowdy fired one shot into Hogsett's chest before he turned the gun on himself. Hogsett was taken to the Montgomery County Hospital where he was pronounced dead. Dowdy survived and was acquitted of murder charges after he was found to be insane. Psychologists during the court case stated that Dowdy believed Virginia Tech administration wanted to kill him because of his disability claims for a back injury and had become paranoid due to depression and hallucinations. The shooting of Hogsett was the result of a chance encounter and Dowdy thought him to be a "pretty nice fellow."

== Career statistics ==
Legend
GP	Games played	GS	Games started	MPG	Minutes per game
FG%	Field goal percentage	3P%	3-point field goal percentage	FT%	Free throw percentage
RPG	Rebounds per game	APG	Assists per game	SPG	Steals per game
BPG	Blocks per game	PPG	Points per game	**Bold**	Career high

=== NBA/ABA ===
==== Regular season ====
Year	Team	GP	MPG	FG%	3P%	FT%	RPG	APG	PPG
1966–67	Detroit	7	3.1	.313		**1.000**	.4	**.1**	**2.3**
1967–68	Pittsburgh (ABA)	**13**	**9.2**	**.350**	–	.412	**1.8**	**.1**	1.6
Career (overall)		20	7.1	.333	–	.565	1.3	.1	1.9
