= U.S. Route 421 in Tennessee =

Segment of American highway

U.S. Route 421

Route information
- Maintained by TDOT
- Length: 43.4 mi (69.8 km)
- Existed: 1933–present

Major junctions
- South end: US 421 at the NC line near Trade
- North end: US 11E / US 19 / US 421 at the VA line in Bristol

Location
- Country: United States
- State: Tennessee
- Counties: Johnson, Sullivan

Highway system
- United States Numbered Highway System; List; Special; Divided; Tennessee State Routes; Interstate; US; State
← SR 420	→ SR 421

U.S. Route 421 (US 421) is a north–south United States highway that runs for 43.4 miles (69.8 km) in East Tennessee, connecting the cities of Mountain City and Bristol.

The entire route is overlapped with SR 34, save for approximately a half mile between US 11E/US 19 and the Virginia State Line.

== Route description ==
=== Johnson County ===
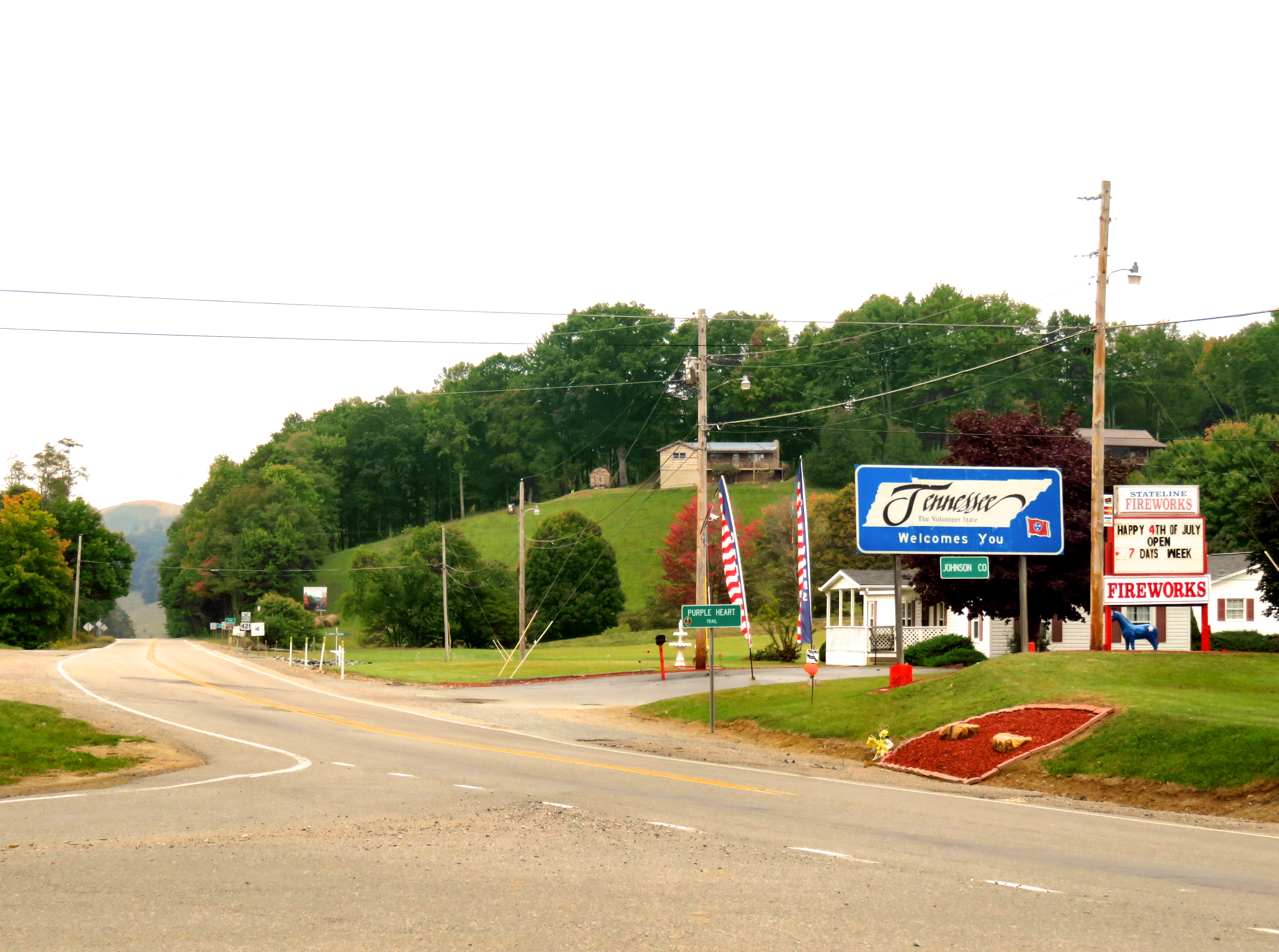
US 421 entering Tennessee from North Carolina

US 421 enters Tennessee from North Carolina just north of Zionville, NC in Johnson County, concurrent with unsigned SR 34, as a 2-lane highway. The highway then goes northwest to enter the oldest unincorporated community in the state, Trade, where it begins an unsigned concurrency with SR 67. The highway continues northwest through countryside and farmland before becoming the eastern boundary of the Cherokee National Forest at the intersection of Bulldog Road before completely entering the National Forest after the intersection with Old Prison Camp Road.

US 421/SR 34/SR 67 then pass and curve around various ridges and mountains before exiting the national forest and entering Mountain City, widening to an undivided 4-lane highway. They pass by an industrial plant and a couple of neighborhoods before having an intersection with SR 167. The highway then passes by a row of businesses before having an intersection with SR 418 and bypassing downtown to the south and west, where they come to another intersection with SR 418, where SR 67 splits off and goes southwest towards Elizabethton. US 421/SR 34 soon come to an intersection and become concurrent with SR 91, just before narrowing to 2-lanes and leaving Mountain City. The highway then passes through more countryside and farmland before the road becomes aggressively curvy with elevation changes throughout as it crosses the Iron Mountains, where the road becomes curvy with elevation changes throughout for several miles. At Sandy Gap, US 421 reaches the highest point of its route in Tennessee at 3,862 feet (1,177 m).

Once descended from the Iron Mountains, US 421/SR 34/SR 91 then enter countryside and farmland again as it enters Shady Valley and come to an intersection with SR 133, where SR 91 splits off to the southwest. US 421/SR 34 then climbs up Holston Mountain, where they cross into Sullivan County at Low Gap.

This is the second stretch of aggressively curvy with constant elevation changing along US 421, with this whole section, between Mountain City and Holston Valley, being very popular with motorcycle enthusiasts.

=== Sullivan County ===
US 421/SR 34 then descends from the mountain range and cross a bridge over South Holston Lake before entering Holston Valley where they become concurrent (unsigned) with SR 44 via a Y-Intersection. The highway then widens to a 4-lane divided highway at an intersection with SR 435 (Bristol Caverns Highway/Old US 421), which provides access to Bristol Caverns. SR 44 then splits off and goes southwest towards Bluff City.

Entering the Bristol city limits at the intersection of SR 394 (which provides access to Bristol Motor Speedway, Bristol Dragway, and I-81) and SR 435, the highway reverts to a two-lane road, as it goes through the Fairmount Neighborhood along Virginia Avenue. Near the Fairmount Elementary School, US 421/SR 34 make a left onto Maple Street, before making a right onto Pennsylvania Avenue. The road then enters downtown and widens to an undivided 4-lane as it curve onto Anderson Street, as it then crosses over a railroad track and several neighborhood streets on a long elevated bridge. The highway then continues west through downtown to an intersection with US 11E/US 19 (Volunteer Parkway), where SR 34 splits off and goes south along US 11E/US 19 while US 421 turns north along US 11E/US 19, along with SR 1, just shortly before crossing into Virginia.

== Junction list ==
County	Location	mi	km	Destinations	Notes
Johnson		0.0	0.0	US 421 south – Boone	Continuation from North Carolina; southern end of SR 34 overlap
Johnson	Trade	0.8	1.3	SR 67 east – Warrensville	Southern end of SR 67 overlap
Johnson	Mountain City	8.9	14.3	SR 167 (Roan Creek Road/Forge Creek Road) – Doeville, Fig	Provides access to Johnson County Airport
Johnson	Mountain City	10.5	16.9	SR 418 north (Church Street) – Downtown	Southern terminus of SR 418
Johnson	Mountain City	11.2	18.0	SR 67 west / SR 418 south (Main Street) – Elizabethton, Downtown	Northern end of SR 67 overlap; northern terminus of SR 418
Johnson	Mountain City	11.8	19.0	SR 91 north – Damascus	Southern end of wrong-way SR 91 overlap
Johnson	Shady Valley	22.1	35.6	SR 91 south / SR 133 north – Elizabethton, Damascus	Northern end of wrong-way SR 91 overlap; southern terminus of SR 133
Sullivan	Holston Valley	34.2	55.0	SR 44 north to I-81 – Abingdon	Southern end of wrong-way SR 44 overlap
Sullivan	Holston Valley	35.9	57.8	SR 435 south (Bristol Caverns Highway) – Bristol Caverns	Northern terminus of SR 435
Sullivan		38.5	62.0	SR 44 south (Hickory Tree Road) – Bluff City	Northern end of wrong-way SR 44 overlap
Sullivan	Bristol	40.3	64.9	SR 394 west / SR 435 north (Bristol Caverns Highway) – Blountville, Bristol Motor Speedway, Bristol Dragway	Eastern terminus of SR 394; southern terminus of SR 435
Sullivan	Bristol	42.8	68.9	Martin Luther King Jr. Boulevard	
Sullivan	Bristol	43.2	69.5	US 11E south / US 19 south (Volunteer Parkway/SR 1 begins/SR 34 east)	Northern end of SR 34 overlap; southern end of US 11E/US 19/SR 1 overlap; eastern terminus of SR 1
Sullivan	Bristol	43.4	69.8	US 11E north / US 19 north / US 421 north (Commonwealth Avenue) – Gate City; State Street (SR 1 west)	Continuation into Virginia; northern end of SR 1 concurrency; SR 1 turns west onto State Street
1.000 mi = 1.609 km; 1.000 km = 0.621 mi: Concurrency terminus

== See also ==
U.S. Route 421
Previous state: North Carolina	Tennessee	Next state: Virginia
