= U.S. Route 19E =

Suffixed section of U.S. Highway in Tennessee and North Carolina

U.S. Route 19E
- US 19E highlighted in red

Route information
- Auxiliary route of US 19
- Maintained by NCDOT and TDOT
- Length: 75.9 mi (122.1 km)
- Existed: 1930–present

Major junctions
- South end: US 19 / US 19W in Cane River, NC
- US 321 / SR 67 in Hampton, TN
- North end: US 11E / US 19 / US 19W in Bluff City, TN

Location
- Country: United States
- States: North Carolina, Tennessee
- Counties: NC: Yancey, Mitchell, Avery; TN: Carter, Sullivan

Highway system
- United States Numbered Highway System; List; Special; Divided
- North Carolina Highway System; Interstate; US; State; Scenic
- Tennessee State Routes; Interstate; US; State
← US 19	NC	→ US 19W
← US 19	TN	→ US 19W
← SR 36	SR 37	→ SR 38

U.S. Route 19E (US 19E) is a divided highway of US 19 in the U.S. states of North Carolina and Tennessee. The United States Numbered Highway, which is complemented by US 19W to the west, travels 75.9 miles (122.1 km) from US 19 and US 19W at Cane River, North Carolina, north to US 11E, US 19, and US 19W in Bluff City, Tennessee. US 19E connects Asheville, North Carolina, and Bristol, Tennessee, with Burnsville, Spruce Pine, and Elk Park in North Carolina and Roan Mountain and Elizabethton in Tennessee. US 19E also has an unsigned concurrency with State Route 37 (SR 37) for its entire course in Tennessee.

== Route description ==
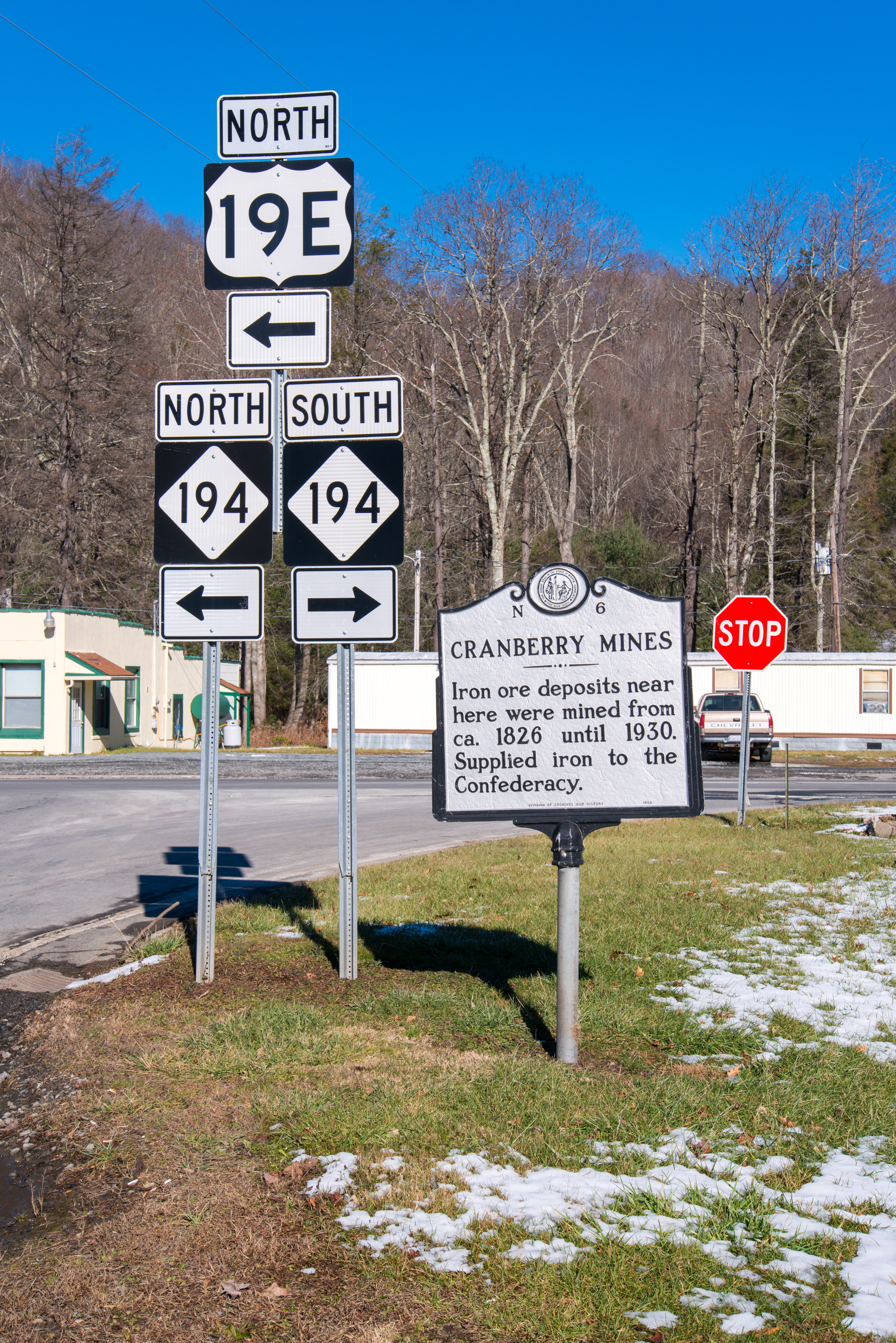
US 19E/NC 194 in Cranberry, North Carolina

US 19E begins at its split with US 19 and US 19W at Cane River. US 19 heads west and then south toward Interstate 26 (I-26) and Asheville. The transition from US 19 to US 19E is a seamless transition that treats US 19W as a side route. US 19E heads east toward the towns of Burnsville and Spruce Pine. The highway is an easy drive, as it nears Spruce Pine, it expands to a four-lane that then bypasses the mountain city. US 19E reverts to two-lane once out of city limits, briefly widening to four-lane again after entering Avery County. Once reaching the community of Ingalls, the highway becomes curvy as it follows along the banks of the North Toe River. Most travelers will take turn onto North Carolina Highway 194 (NC 194, Mullen Hill Road; a shortcut bypassing Ingalls) as an alternate route toward Elk Park. Passing through several small communities, it eventually reaches the town of Elk Park, where it then proceeds into Tennessee. US 19E travels a total of 45 miles (72 km) from Cane River to the Tennessee state line.

From the North Carolina state line, US 19E lazily curves down to Roan Mountain, from which SR 143 heads south toward Roan Mountain State Park and actual Roan Mountain at the Tennessee–North Carolina border. Near Hampton, US 19E widens to an expressway and begins to run concurrently with US 321. At Elizabethton, US 321 splits west toward Johnson City. At Bluff City, US 19E and US 19W merge back into US 19, heading north to Bristol.

== History ==
Established in 1927, US 19 traversed from the Georgia state line (at Bellview) to the Tennessee state line (at Elk Park), roughly similar to the route seen today. In 1930, US 19 was truncated at Cane River, where it was split into US 19E and US 19W; US 19E follows the original US 19 routing north. In 1984, US 19E was realigned in Yancey County to its current routing. On November 2, 2012, US 19 and US 19E were widened from I-26 to Jacks Creek Road, just west of Burnsville. At a cost of $107.9 million (equivalent to $142 million in 2023), the 13.6-mile (21.9 km) two-lane mountain road was upgraded to a four-lane highway, and the first for Yancey County. Governor Bev Perdue was on hand at the ribbon-cutting ceremony opening the highway.

US 19 first appeared in Tennessee in 1927, from the North Carolina state line (near Elk Park) to Bluff City. Later in the same year, it was extended through Bristol into Virginia. In 1930, US 19 was truncated at Bluff City, splitting into US 19E along the original route into North Carolina and US 19W going toward Johnson City and then on into North Carolina. In 1994, a new four-lane expressway was completed between Elizabethton to Bluff City; the abandoned route became Old Bristol Highway in Carter County and Old Elizabethton Highway in Sullivan County.

== Future ==
US 19E from the east end of the four-lane divided highway west of Burnsville to Ingalls is to be widened into a multilane highway. The segment through Burnsville to Micaville is complete. The newest section west of Spruce Pine was completed in October 2020. The last remaining section east of Spruce Pine is currently subject to reprioritization.

== Junction list ==
State	County	Location	mi	km	Destinations	Notes
North Carolina	Yancey	Cane River	0.0	0.0	US 19 south / US 19W north – Asheville, Erwin	Southern terminus of US 19E; US 19E and US 19W come together to form US 19
North Carolina	Yancey	Burnsville	6.2	10.0	NC 197 south (Pensacola Road)	South end of NC 197 overlap
North Carolina	Yancey	Burnsville	6.9	11.1	NC 197 north (Mine Fork Road) – Bakersville	North end of NC 197 overlap
North Carolina	Yancey	Micaville	10.8	17.4	NC 80 south – Marion, Mount Mitchell	South end of NC 80 overlap
North Carolina	Yancey	Micaville	12.0	19.3	NC 80 north – Bakersville	North end of NC 80 overlap
North Carolina	Mitchell	Spruce Pine	18.4	29.6	NC 226 north – Bakersville, Little Switzerland, Marion	South end of NC 226 overlap
North Carolina	Mitchell	Spruce Pine	19.1	30.7	NC 226 south – Little Switzerland, Marion	North end of NC 226 overlap
North Carolina	Avery	Ingalls	26.2	42.2	NC 194 north (Three Mile Highway) – Newland	Southern terminus of NC 194
North Carolina	Avery	Cranberry	42.5	68.4	NC 194 south (Elk Park Highway) – Newland	South end of NC 194 overlap
North Carolina	Avery	Elk Park	42.9	69.0	NC 194 north – Banner Elk	North end of NC 194 overlap
			44.9 0.0	72.3 0.0	North Carolina–Tennessee state line	
Tennessee	Carter	Roan Mountain	4.7	7.6	SR 143 south – Roan Mountain State Park	Northern terminus of SR 143
Tennessee	Carter	Tiger Valley	12.4	20.0	SR 173 west (Simerly Creek Road) – Unicoi	
Tennessee	Carter	Hampton	14.9	24.0	SR 361 west (Gap Creek Road)	
Tennessee	Carter	Hampton	16.9	27.2	US 321 south / SR 67 east – Mountain City, Watauga Lake, Boone	South end of US 321 and east end of SR 67 overlap
Tennessee	Carter	Elizabethton	22.0	35.4	US 321 south / SR 67 west (Broad Street) – Johnson City	North end of US 321 and west end of SR 67 overlap
Tennessee	Carter	Elizabethton	22.4	36.0	SR 91 north / Lover's Lane – Stoney Creek, Shady Valley, Elizabethton Municipal Airport	Partial cloverleaf interchange; Access to Lover's Lane via extra northbound ramp; Southbound uses same ramp as SR 91
Tennessee	Sullivan	Bluff City	30.7	49.4	SR 44 north (Bluff City Highway) – Bluff City	
Tennessee	Sullivan	Bluff City	31.0	49.9	US 11E / US 19 north (SR 34) / US 19W south – Johnson City, Bristol, Piney Flats	Northern terminus of US 19E; US 19E and US 19W come together to form US 19
1.000 mi = 1.609 km; 1.000 km = 0.621 mi: Concurrency terminus

== See also ==
- Doe Hill Mountain
- East Tennessee and Western North Carolina Railroad
- Overmountain Victory National Historic Trail
- Pisgah National Forest
- Unaka Range

Preceded by North Carolina	U.S. Route 19; US 19E; US 19W	Succeeded by Tennessee
