= U.S. Route 11E =

Suffixed U.S. Highway in Tennessee and Virginia in the United States

U.S. Route 11E
- US 11E in red and US 11E Bus. in blue

Route information
- Auxiliary route of US 11
- Length: 120.94 mi (194.63 km)
- Existed: June 3, 1929–present

Major junctions
- South end: US 11 / US 11W / US 70 in Knoxville, TN
- I-40 / US 25W in Knoxville, TN; US 25W / US 70 in Carter, TN; US 25E in Morristown, TN; I-81 near Bulls Gap, TN; US 321 in Greeneville, TN; I-26 / US 19W / US 23 in Johnson City, TN; US 19E in Bluff City, TN; US 421 in Bristol, VA
- North end: US 11 / US 11W / US 19 / US 421 in Bristol, VA

Location
- Country: United States
- States: Tennessee, Virginia
- Counties: TN: Knox, Jefferson, Hamblen, Hawkins, Greene, Washington, Sullivan; VA: City of Bristol

Highway system
- United States Numbered Highway System; List; Special; Divided
- Virginia Routes; Interstate; US; Primary; Secondary; Byways; History; HOT lanes
- Tennessee State Routes; Interstate; US; State
← US 11	VA	→ US 11W
← US 11	TN	→ US 11W

U.S. Route 11E (US 11E) is a divided highway branch of US 11 in the U.S. states of Tennessee and Virginia. The United States Numbered Highway, which is complemented by US 11W to the north and west, runs 120.94 miles (194.63 km) from US 11, US 11W, and US 70 in Knoxville, Tennessee, north and east to US 11, US 11W, US 19, and US 421 in Bristol, Virginia. US 11E connects Knoxville and the twin cities of Bristol, Virginia, and Bristol, Tennessee, with the East Tennessee communities of Morristown, Greeneville, and Johnson City. The U.S. Highway runs concurrently with US 70 and US 25W east of Knoxville, US 321 from Greeneville and Johnson City, and both US 19W and US 19 between Johnson City and Bristol. US 11E also has an unsigned concurrency with State Route 34 (SR 34) for almost all of its course in Tennessee.

US 11E roughly follows a series of Native American trails that were later important to early European American explorers and settlers in the area. These trails became part of the Great Wagon Road during the colonial era. When the U.S. Highway System was established in 1926, this road was initially given the designation of US 511. In 1929, the Tennessee state government petitioned federal highway officials to split US 11 into two branches in this area. Federal officials later tried to reverse this split, but this action was never recognized by the state governments and never went into effect. Since the mid-20th century, most of US 11E has been widened to a four-lane divided highway with bypasses around central parts of cities and towns.

== Route description ==
Lengths
	mi	km
TN	120.36	193.70
VA	0.58	0.93
Total	120.94	194.63

=== Knoxville to Morristown ===
US 11E begins at an intersection with the northern terminus of mainline US 11 in Tennessee, the southern end of US 11W, and US 70 in Knoxville. US 11 and US 70 head west as Magnolia Avenue toward Zoo Knoxville and Downtown Knoxville; US 11W heads northeast along Rutledge Pike. US 11E heads east together with US 70 as Asheville Highway, a four-lane divided highway that leaves the city of Knoxville at its diamond interchange with Interstate 40 (I-40). US 11E and US 70 are joined by US 25W at the I-40 interchange; the three highways use the J. Will Taylor Bridge to cross the Holston River and meet the eastern end of SR 168 (Governor John Sevier Highway). At Carter (also known as Trentville), US 25W and US 70 continue east as Asheville Highway while US 11E splits northeast as four-lane divided Andrew Johnson Highway. The U.S. Highway crosses the Knox–Jefferson county line in Strawberry Plains, where the highway intersects SR 139 (Old Dandridge Pike).

US 11E passes through the town of New Market on its way to Jefferson City, which contains Carson–Newman University. At the west end of the town, the U.S. Highway intersects SR 92, which follows a part of US 11E's old alignment, Old Andrew Johnson Highway. SR 92 runs concurrently with US 11E to south of downtown Jefferson City, where it heads south toward the county seat of Dandridge. US 11E crosses over Norfolk Southern Railway's Knoxville East District and enters Hamblen County at Talbott, where the highway intersects SR 341 (Talbott Kansas Road). The U.S. Highway continues through Alpha (which has been annexed by the city of Morristown), the site of several industrial parks, the National Weather Service forecast office for East Tennessee, Southwest Virginia and Western North Carolina, the Morristown Regional Airport, and the highway's southern intersection with SR 342 and the northern terminus of SR 160 (Air Park Boulevard). The two highways run concurrently until SR 342 heads north as Panther Creek Road toward Panther Creek State Park just west of the city limits of Morristown.

=== Morristown to Johnson City ===
US 11E heads through a commercial area along Andrew Johnson Highway to west of downtown Morristown, where the highway turns southeast onto Morris Boulevard, a five-lane road with center turn lane that crosses the railroad tracks and passes through an industrial area where the highway intersects SR 66 (Fairmont Avenue). US 11E intersects SR 343 (Cumberland Street) and passes College Square Mall before reaching a partial cloverleaf interchange with US 25E (Davy Crockett Parkway). US 11E heads north along the freeway for 0.5 miles (0.80 km) before another partial cloverleaf interchange where the highway becomes concurrent with SR 66 along Andrew Johnson Highway. The two highways closely parallel the railroad line as a two-lane road and leave the city limits of Morristown just west of Russellville, where SR 344 splits northeast along Old Russellville Pike. US 11E and SR 66 pass through Whitesburg shortly before curving southeast and entering Hawkins County. The U.S. and state highways diverge in the town of Bulls Gap shortly before US 11E crosses a perpendicular rail line and follows the Knoxville East District through Bulls Gap, a low point in Bays Mountain.

US 11E continues southeast into Greene County and Mosheim city limits, where the highway expands to a four-lane divided highway after it passes Volunteer Speedway and has a diamond interchange with I-81. The U.S. Highway crosses Lick Creek and passes through the town of Mosheim before reaching the town of Greeneville the home of Andrew Johnson National Historic Site. On westside of the town, US 11E has a partial cloverleaf interchange with Blue Springs Parkway, which heads east as US 11E Business and SR 70 (Summer Street). SR 70 joins the U.S. Highway for a short distance before heading north as Lonesome Pine Trail. US 11E has an interchange with SR 172 (Baileyton Road) before closely spaced intersections with US 321 (North Main Street), which joins US 11E in a concurrency, and the southern terminus of SR 93 (Kingsport Highway). After crossing the Knoxville East rail line, the U.S. Highway receives the eastern end of its business route and SR 107 (Tusculum Boulevard). SR 107 runs concurrently with the U.S. Highways east to the city of Tusculum, where the state highway heads southeast as Tusculum Bypass then as Erwin Highway and passes Tusculum University.

US 11E and US 321 head northeast and cross over the rail line at Afton. The two highways intersect SR 351 (Rheatown Road) north of the community of Chuckey. The U.S. Highways also pass to the north of David Crockett Birthplace State Park before entering Washington County, where the highways pass along the north edge of Limestone, meet the south end of SR 75 (Opie Arnold Road), and cross Big Limestone Creek. US 11E and US 321 intersect SR 81 (College Street) and SR 354 (Boones Creek Road) on the west and east sides, respectively, of the town of Jonesborough. The U.S. Highways enter the city of Johnson City at their crossing of a north–south rail line. Just east of the downtown, where US 11E becomes Market Street, US 321 turns south onto State of Franklin Road, a western boulevard bypass of Johnson City that heads north as SR 381. US 11E passes to the north of Mountain Home, the site of several hospitals, including a VA medical center. East of University Parkway, which serves the campus of East Tennessee State University, the U.S. Highway curves north while SR 91 continues east along the one-way pair of Main and Market streets to serve downtown Johnson City.

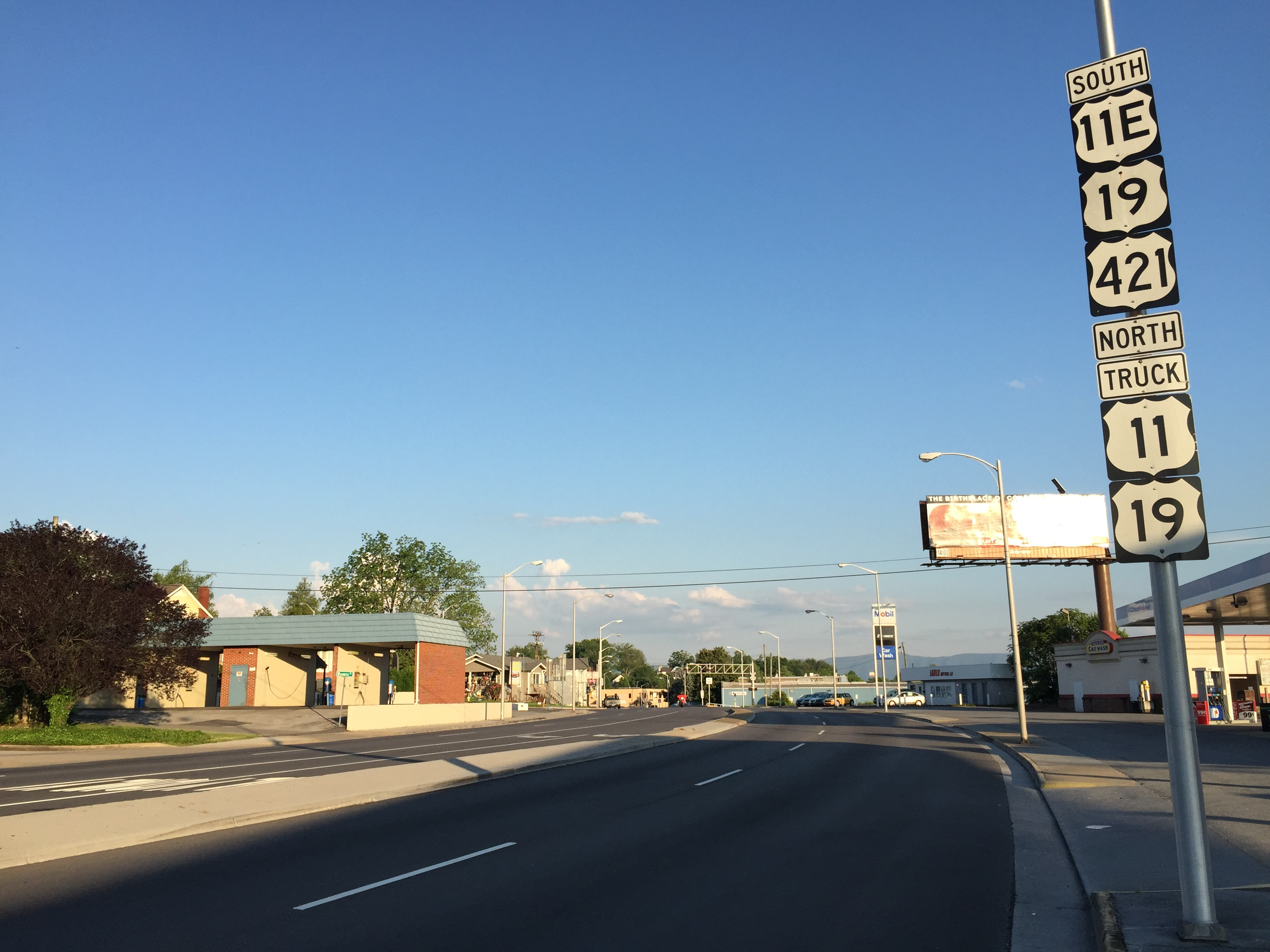
View south at the north end of US 11E at US 11/US 11W/US 19/US 421 in Bristol

=== Johnson City to Bristol ===
Map of northern junction of US 11W, US 11E, and US 11 in Bristol, VA

US 11E heads north past Science Hill High School to Roan Street, the main north–south street of downtown Johnson City that the U.S. Highway joins. The highway passes the Mall at Johnson City and meets I-26 and US 23 at a partial cloverleaf interchange. US 19W joins US 11E at the interchange; when Roan Street continues north as SR 36, the two U.S. Highways curve northeast as Bristol Highway, which meets the northern end of SR 381 (State of Franklin Road) at an interchange. The highways head northeast and cross the Watauga River arm of Boone Lake and enter Sullivan County. In the town of Bluff City, US 11E and US 19W curve north while SR 44 (Bluff City Highway) continues north into downtown Bluff City. Just north of SR 44, the U.S. highways meet the northern end of US 19E; US 11E continues north concurrent with mainline US 19 and crosses the South Fork Holston River.

US 11E and US 19 have a diamond interchange with SR 394 just west of the state highway's junction with SR 390 (Bluff City Highway). The U.S. Highways cross Beaver Creek adjacent to Bristol Motor Speedway and follow the stream's valley between the Whitetop Knobs to the east and the Beaver Creek Knobs to the west. US 11E and US 19 enter the city of Bristol and follow Volunteer Parkway to the Tennessee–Virginia state line. State Street, which heads west as SR 1, follows the boundary and serves as the main street of both cities Bristol. The two U.S. Highways and State Route 381 (SR 381) head north into the independent city of Bristol along Commonwealth Avenue, a four-lane divided highway that intersects Goode Street one block north of the state line; Goode Street carries US 421 and both US 11 Truck and US 19 Truck through the Bristol Commercial Historic District. US 11E, US 19, US 421, and SR 381 meet the southern end of SR 113 at separate intersections: Cumberland Street carries northbound SR 113 east and Sycamore Street carries the westbound direction. The four highways continue north to east–west Euclid Avenue, where US 11E has its northern terminus. SR 381 continues north along Commonwealth Avenue to the southern end of I-381, a spur south from I-81. Westbound Euclid Avenue heads west carrying northbound US 421 and southbound US 11W. At this intersection, US 11E and US 11W come together to form mainline US 11, which follows eastbound Euclid Avenue with northbound US 19.

== History ==
=== Early history ===
U.S. Route 511
- Location: Knoxville, Tennessee–Bristol, Virginia
- Existed: November 11, 1926–June 3, 1929

US 11E roughly follows the corridor of a series of Native American trails that existed in the region prior to the settlement of Tennessee by European Americans. Some of these trails were part of the Great Indian Warpath, with the main route of this path being traveled by what is now US 11W. The US 11E corridor reportedly follows a lesser used trail that became part of the Great Wagon Road, also known as the Great Valley Road, in the latter 18th century. This route, along with the Warpath, were widely used by early explorers and settlers of the region.

On October 1, 1923, the route was designated as SR 34 as part of the establishment of the Tennessee State Route System and first numbered state routes in Tennessee. When the United States Numbered Highway System was formed by Congress in 1926, SR 34 was designated as US 511, and the route to the west became US 11. Many local government and business representatives along US 511 were upset with this numbering, prompting then Tennessee Governor Austin Peay to demand that US 11 become a divided highway from Knoxville to Bristol. In 1929, the Tennessee government successfully petitioned the American Association of State Highway Officials (AASHO) to redesignate US 11 as US 11W and US 511 as US 11E in an event that came to be known as "The Tennessee Split". This was approved on June 3, 1929.

In 1934, following the discontinuation of split routes by AASHO, the US 11 split effectively ended. US 11W was recognized as US 11 again by the federal government and US 11E was reassigned to be part of US 411, another highway that exists in Tennessee south of the split section of US 11. However, AASHO had no way to enforce the elimination of the Tennessee Split. Tennessee officials never removed signage of US 11W and US 11E recognizing them as such, and state maps still acknowledged the suffixed routes. In 1952, unable to have Tennessee enforce the change, AASHO designated US 11 as US 11W and US 411 as US 11E again to eliminate differences between federal and state records and maps.

In the 1940s, planners chose to route the freeway that became I-81 roughly along the US 11E and 11W corridors. Unlike many Interstate Highways, however, this section of I-81 was not chosen to closely parallel any US Highway, and US 11E and 11W both remained important highways after I-81 was completed in 1975.

=== Improvements ===
Throughout the later 20th century, most of US 11E was widened to four lanes, and much of the original alignment was relocated in favor of bypasses around business districts of cities and towns. On January 2, 1954, the four-lane section between Strawberry Plains and New Market opened to traffic. The four-mile (6.4 km) section between Jefferson City and the Jefferson-Hamblen County line was completed in October 1954. The six-mile (9.7 km) stretch between the Holston River and the US 25W/70 split was completed in November 1954; two miles (3.2 km) extending into Knoxville were completed a few weeks later. Work on the last four-lane section between Knoxville and Morristown, eight miles (13 km) between the Jefferson and Hamblen County line and Morristown, began in January 1960 and was completed in August 1961. Construction on a three-mile (4.8 km) section between the Bristol Motor Speedway and south of Bristol began in June 1966. Work on the four-lane relocation around Bluff City between south of the split with US 19W/SR 44 and near the Bristol Motor Speedway, referred to at the time as the Bluff City Bypass, began on May 19, 1973, and after multiple delays, opened to traffic on April 29, 1976. The 11-mile (18 km) stretch between the Greene-Washington County line and Jonesborough was widened between the summer of 1987 and November 1988. In April 2025, construction began to widen US 11E to five lanes from US 25E and Steadman Road east of Morristown. This project is expected to be complete in September 2029, and additional phases will widen the last remaining two-lane portion of US 11E out to I-81.

== Major intersections ==
State	County	Location	mi	km	Destinations	Notes
Tennessee	Knox	Knoxville	0.00	0.00	US 11 south / US 70 west (E Magnolia Avenue/SR 1 west) – Knoxville, Zoo Knoxville, Chilhowee Park	Interchange; southern end of US 70 / SR 168 overlap; US 11W south and US 11E merge into US 11
Tennessee	Knox	Knoxville	0.00	0.00	US 11W north (Rutledge Pike/SR 1 east) to I-40	Interchange; southbound exit only
Tennessee	Knox	Knoxville	2.0	3.2	I-40 / US 25W north – Knoxville, Asheville	I-40 exit 394; southern end of US 25W / SR 9 overlap
Tennessee	Knox	Knoxville	2.7– 2.9	4.3– 4.7	J. Will Taylor Bridge over the Holston River	
Tennessee	Knox	Knoxville	3.0	4.8	SR 168 west (E Governor John Sevier Highway) – Governor John Sevier Home State Historic Site, Ramsey House Historic Site	Northern end of SR 168 overlap
Tennessee	Knox	Carter	8.1	13.0	US 25W south / US 70 east (Asheville Highway/SR 9 south) – Dandridge	Interchange; northern end of US 25W / US 70 / SR 9 overlap; southern end of SR 34 overlap
Tennessee	Jefferson	Strawberry Plains	12.3	19.8	SR 139 east (Old Dandridge Pike) – Kodak	Western terminus of SR 139
Tennessee	Jefferson	Jefferson City	21.9	35.2	SR 92 north (Old Andrew Johnson Highway) – TVA Cherokee Dam, Rutledge	Southern end of SR 92 overlap
Tennessee	Jefferson	Jefferson City	23.2	37.3	SR 92 south to I-40 – Dandridge	Northern end of SR 92 overlap
Tennessee	Hamblen	Morristown	28.4	45.7	SR 341 east (Talbott Kansas Road) – White Pine	Western terminus of SR 341
Tennessee	Hamblen	Morristown	30.5	49.1	SR 160 south (Air Park Boulevard) – Newport / SR 342 east	Southern end of SR 342 overlap; northern terminus of SR 160
Tennessee	Hamblen	Morristown	31.7	51.0	SR 342 west (Panther Creek Road) / Old Highway 11E – Panther Creek State Park, Airport	Northern end of SR 342 overlap
Tennessee	Hamblen	Morristown	36.1	58.1	Merchants Greene Boulevard - White Pine	southern end of SR 66 overlap
Tennessee	Hamblen	Morristown	37.1	59.7	SR 343 (South Cumberland Street)	
Tennessee	Hamblen	Morristown	39.1	62.9	US 25E south (SR 32) to I-81 – White Pine, Newport	Interchange; southern end of US 25E / SR 32 overlap; US 11E south follows exit 2A
Tennessee	Hamblen	Morristown	39.5	63.6	US 25E north (SR 32) / East Andrew Johnson Highway – Bean Station, Morristown	Interchange; northern end of US 25E / SR 32 overlap; US 11E north follows exit 2B
Tennessee	Hamblen	Russellville	43.2	69.5	SR 344 north (Old Russellville Pike)	Southern terminus of SR 344
Tennessee	Hamblen	Whitesburg	47.3	76.1	SR 113 (Simpson Road / Silver City Road)	
Tennessee	Hawkins	Bulls Gap	50.5	81.3	SR 66 north (North Main Street) – Rogersville	Northern end of SR 66 overlap
Tennessee	Greene	Mosheim	54.2	87.2	I-81 – Bristol, Knoxville	I-81 exit 23
Tennessee	Greene	Mosheim	59.5	95.8	SR 348 west (Midway Road) – Midway	Eastern terminus of SR 348
Tennessee	Greene	Greeneville	65.7	105.7	US 11E Bus. north / US 321 Truck south / SR 70 south (Summer Street) / Blue Springs Parkway – Downtown Greeneville	Interchange; southern end of US 321 Truck / SR 70 overlap
Tennessee	Greene	Greeneville	66.2	106.5	SR 70 north (Lonesome Pine Trail) – Rogersville	Northern end of SR 70 overlap
Tennessee	Greene	Greeneville	67.4	108.5	SR 172 (Baileyton Road) to I-81 – Airport, Baileyton	Interchange
Tennessee	Greene	Greeneville	67.8	109.1	US 321 south (North Main Street/SR 35) – Downtown Greeneville, Newport, Gatlinburg	Southern end of US 321 overlap
Tennessee	Greene	Greeneville	67.9	109.3	SR 93 north (Kingsport Highway) – Kingsport	Southern terminus of SR 93
Tennessee	Greene	Greeneville	68.9	110.9	Snapps Ferry Road	Interchange
Tennessee	Greene	Greeneville	69.7	112.2	US 11E Bus. south (Tusculum Boulevard) / SR 107 west	Southern end of SR 107 overlap
Tennessee	Greene	Greeneville	70.5	113.5	Erwin Highway – Tusculum University, Tusculum	Former SR 107 east
Tennessee	Greene	Tusculum	72.3	116.4	SR 107 east (Tusculum Bypass) – Erwin	Northern end of SR 107 overlap
Tennessee	Greene		76.9	123.8	SR 351 (Rheatown Road / Chuckey Pike) – Rheatown, Chuckey	
Tennessee	Washington	Limestone	80.5	129.6	SR 75 north (Opie Arnold Road) – Gray	Southern terminus of SR 75
Tennessee	Washington	Jonesborough	88.6	142.6	Persimmon Ridge Road – Lamar, truck route To SR 81 / SR 353	
Tennessee	Washington	Jonesborough	89.8	144.5	Washington Drive to SR 81 – Erwin, Kingsport, Business District	
Tennessee	Washington	Jonesborough	90.6	145.8	SR 354 north (Boones Creek Road) to I-26 / Boone Street – Boones Creek, Business District	Southern terminus of SR 354
Tennessee	Washington	Johnson City	95.4	153.5	US 321 north / SR 381 (North State of Franklin Road) – Tri-Cities Regional Airport, Elizabethton	Northern end of US 321 overlap
Tennessee	Washington	Johnson City	96.6	155.5	SR 91 north (To West Main Street) – Downtown Johnson City	Southern terminus of SR 91
Tennessee	Washington	Johnson City	98.8	159.0	I-26 / US 19W south / US 23 – Kingsport, Asheville	I-26 exit 20; southern end of US 19W / SR 36 overlap
Tennessee	Washington	Johnson City	99.6	160.3	SR 36 north (North Roan Street) – Tri-Cities Regional Airport, Kingsport	Northern end of SR 36 overlap
Tennessee	Washington	Johnson City	100.4	161.6	SR 381 south to I-26 – Kingsport, Johnson City	Interchange; northern terminus of SR 381
Tennessee	Washington	Johnson City	102.7– 102.8	165.3– 165.4	William Devault Bridge over Boone Lake/Watauga River	
Tennessee	Sullivan	Bluff City	108.1	174.0	To SR 44 north (Bluff City Highway) – Bluff City	Southern terminus of SR 44; No access from US 11E southbound lanes and no access from SR 44 to northbound US 11E
Tennessee	Sullivan	Bluff City	108.5	174.6	US 19E south (SR 37 south) – Bluff City, Elizabethton	Interchange; Northern end of US 19W overlap; Southern end of US 19 overlap; US 19W north and US 19E merge to form US 19; northern terminus of unsigned SR 37
Tennessee	Sullivan	Bluff City	109.2– 109.3	175.7– 175.9	Charlie Worley Bridge over Boone Lake/South Fork Holston River	
Tennessee	Sullivan	Bristol	112.2	180.6	SR 394 / SR 390 south to I-81 – Bluff City, Blountville	Interchange; northern terminus of SR 390
Tennessee	Sullivan	Bristol	116.8	188.0	Bluff City Highway	Interchange; northbound exit and southbound entrance
Tennessee	Sullivan	Bristol	119.5	192.3	SR 358 south (Weaver Pike)	Northern terminus of SR 358
Tennessee	Sullivan	Bristol	120.1	193.3	US 421 south (Anderson Street / SR 34 east)	Northern end of SR 34 overlap; Southern end of US 421 / SR 1 overlap; eastern terminus of SR 1
Tennessee–Virginia state line			120.3 0.00	193.6 0.00	West State Street (SR 1 west); Northern end of SR 1 overlap southern end of SR 381 overlap	
Virginia	City of Bristol		0.08	0.13	US 11 Truck north (Goode Street) / US 19 Truck north	Southern end of US 11 Truck / US 19 Truck overlap
Virginia	City of Bristol		0.23	0.37	Cumberland Street (SR 113 north)	
Virginia	City of Bristol		0.58	0.93	US 11 / US 19 north (Euclid Avenue east) / US 11W south / US 421 north (Euclid Avenue west) to Commonwealth Avenue (SR 381 north) / I-81	Northern end of US 421 / US 11 Truck / US 19 Truck / SR 381 overlap; US 11W north and US 11E merge into US 11
1.000 mi = 1.609 km; 1.000 km = 0.621 mi: Concurrency terminus; Incomplete access; Route transition

== Greeneville business route ==
U.S. Route 11E Business
- Location: Greeneville, Tennessee
- Length: 4.6 mi (7.4 km)

U.S. Route 11E Business (US 11E Bus.) is a business route of US 11E in Greeneville, Tennessee. The highway runs 4.6 miles (7.4 km) between junctions with US 11E on the west and east sides of Greeneville. US 11E Bus. begins at a partial cloverleaf interchange with US 11E (Andrew Johnson Highway) and SR 70. East of where SR 70 splits to the south, the business route enters the town as Summer Street. In the downtown area, US 11E Bus. turns north onto Main Street, joining US 321 and SR 107. The business route and SR 107 turn east onto Tusculum Boulevard, which they follow out of the downtown area and pass through a heavily congested area (they also pass Walters State Community College's Greeneville campus and Greeneville High School) to the business route's eastern terminus at US 11E.
