= Virginia State Route 75 =

State highway in Washington County, Virginia, US

State Route 75

Route information
- Maintained by VDOT
- Length: 10.51 mi (16.91 km)
- Existed: 1940–present

Major junctions
- South end: SR 44 near Holston Valley, TN
- I-81 / US 58 in Abingdon
- North end: US 11 / US 58 Alt. in Abingdon

Location
- Country: United States
- State: Virginia

Highway system
- Virginia Routes; Interstate; US; Primary; Secondary; Byways; History; HOT lanes
← SR 74	→ SR 76

State Route 75 (SR 75) is a primary state highway in the southwest part of the U.S. state of Virginia, running southwest from U.S. Route 11 and U.S. Route 58 Alternate in Abingdon to Tennessee's State Route 44.

== Route description ==
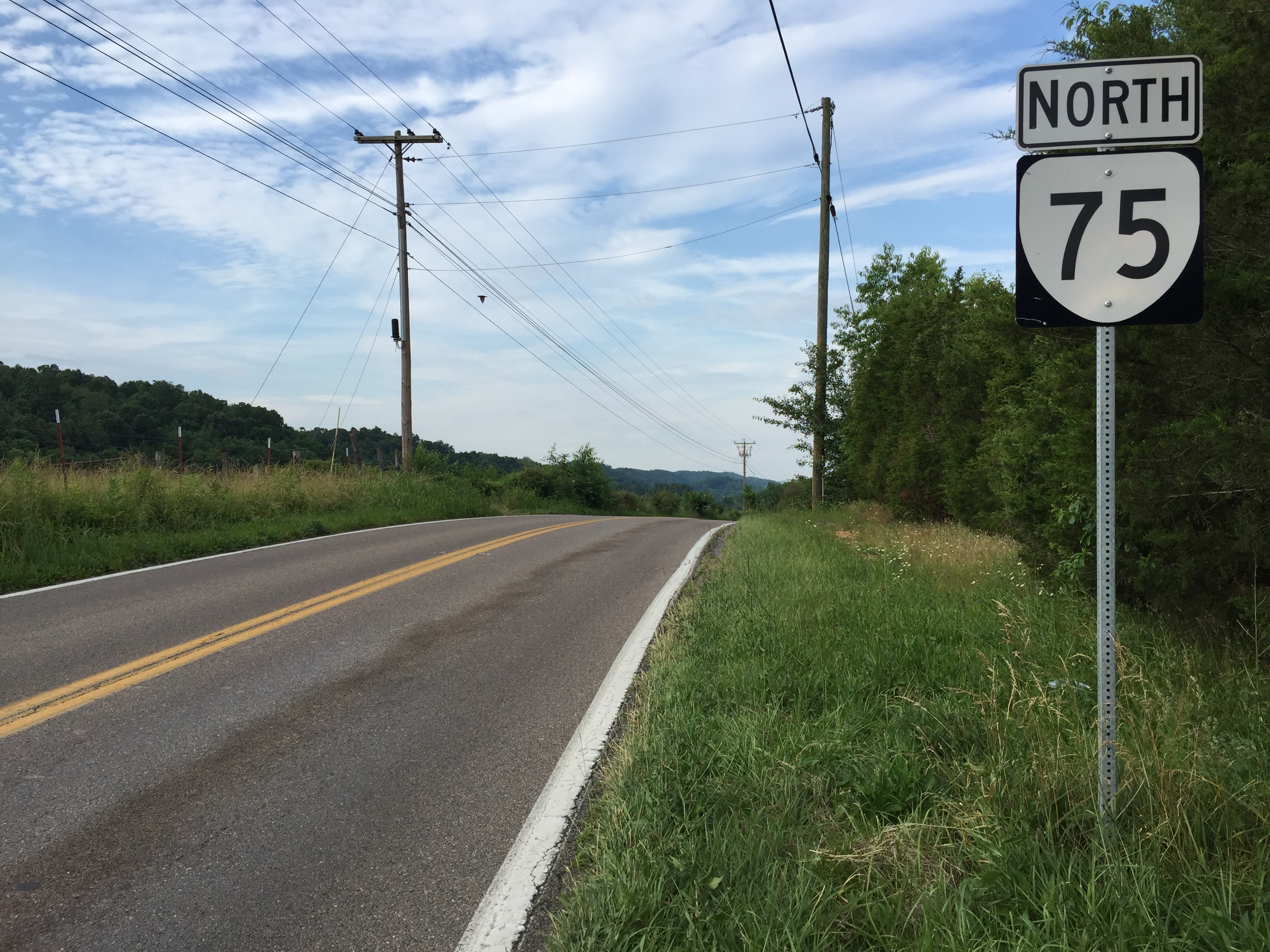
View north at the south end of SR 75 at SR 44 at the Tennessee state line

SR 75 crosses the Tennessee state line from State Route 44 in the Holston Valley, formed by the South Fork Holston River. It crosses the low McConnell Ridge at Green Spring into the Watauga Valley, and after running through that valley for a while it turns north to cross the Great Knobs, mostly along a small creek. SR 75 enters the town of Abingdon and crosses Interstate 81/U.S. Route 58, at which point U.S. Route 58 Alternate begins along SR 75, and then ends at the intersection with U.S. Route 11 downtown.

== History ==
The road from Abingdon northwest to Dickensonville (now part of U.S. Route 58 Alternate) was part of the original state highway system designated in 1918, as a spur of State Route 10 (now U.S. Route 11). It was assigned the number State Route 106 in the 1923 renumbering, and it was extended south and southwest five miles (8 km) towards the Tennessee state line in 1925. In the 1928 renumbering, the whole of SR 106 became State Route 110, and extensions added 3.12 miles (5.02 km) in 1929 and another 3.24 miles (5.21 km) in 1931.

U.S. Route 19 was added from Abingdon northwest to Hansonville in the late 1920s. Thus, SR 110 was split in the 1933 renumbering; the short piece northwest of Hansonville became part of State Route 71 (which mainly replaced State Route 107). The piece south of Abingdon became State Route 77, and, later that year, the final 0.14 miles (0.23 km) to the Tennessee state line were added. In the 1940 renumbering, SR 77 was renumbered State Route 75, as Virginia expected Tennessee to renumber its State Route 44 to match, but this never happened.

== Major intersections ==
The entire route is in Washington County.

Location	mi	km	Destinations	Notes
	0.00	0.00	SR 44 south – South Holston Dam	Tennessee state line; southern terminus
Abingdon	9.73	15.66	I-81 / US 58 – Bristol, Roanoke	Exit 17 (I-81); eastern terminus of US 58 Alt.; southern end of US 58 Alt. concurrency
Abingdon	10.51	16.91	US 11 / US 58 Alt. west (West Main Street) – Barter Theatre	Northern terminus; northern end of US 58 Alt. concurrency
1.000 mi = 1.609 km; 1.000 km = 0.621 mi: Concurrency terminus

< SR 105	Spurs of SR 10; 1923–1928	SR 107 >
< SR 109	District 1 State Routes; 1928–1933	SR 111 >
