= U.S. Route 19 in Tennessee =

Highway in Tennessee

U.S. Route 19
- US 19 highlighted in red

Route information
- Maintained by TDOT
- Length: 11.8 mi (19.0 km)
- Existed: 1927–present

Major junctions
- South end: US 11E / US 19E / US 19W in Bluff City
- US 421 in Bristol
- North end: US 11E / US 19 / US 421 at the Virginia state line in Bristol

Location
- Country: United States
- State: Tennessee
- Counties: Sullivan

Highway system
- United States Numbered Highway System; List; Special; Divided; Tennessee State Routes; Interstate; US; State
← SR 18	→ US 19E

U.S. Route 19 (US 19) traverses approximately 11.8 miles (19.0 km) across the Tri-Cities area of East Tennessee. The highway begins at Bluff City, where the highway splits into US 19E and US 19W, which both head into North Carolina and rejoin to form US 19 in North Carolina. US 19's Tennessee portion ends at the Virginia state line at the twin cities of Bristol, Tennessee, and Bristol, Virginia.

== Route description ==
US 19 is formed at Bluff City by the confluence of US 19E and US 19W. US 19E heads southeast toward Elizabethton and US 19W continues southwest concurrent with US 11E toward Johnson City. US 19 heads north concurrent with US 11E along Volunteer Parkway across the South Fork Holston River. The U.S. Highways have a diamond interchange with State Route 394 (SR 394) just west of the state highway's junction with SR 390 (Bluff City Highway). The U.S. Highways cross Beaver Creek adjacent to Bristol Motor Speedway and follow the stream's valley between the Whitetop Knobs to the east and the Beaver Creek Knobs to the west. US 11E and US 19 enter the city of Bristol. Three blocks south of the state line, the highways meet US 421 (Anderson Street). SR 34 breaks from its unsigned concurrency with US 11E and US 19 and heads east on US 421 toward Mountain City. The intersection forms the eastern terminus of SR 1. SR 1 joins the three U.S. Highways for three blocks to State Street, which follows the Tennessee–Virginia state line and serves as the main street of both cities of Bristol. SR 1 turns west along State Street while the three U.S. Highways continue into Bristol, Virginia.

=== Alternate names ===
Though the highway is commonly known as "US 19" throughout the state, the highway does have other known names it uses locally in areas.

- Volunteer Parkway: Road name from the Virginia state line to Bluff City.

== History ==
US 19 first appears in Tennessee in 1927, from the North Carolina state line (near Elk Park) to Bluff City. Later in the same year, it was extended through Bristol, into Virginia. In 1930, US 19 was truncated at Bluff City, splitting into US 19E along the original route into North Carolina and US 19W going toward Johnson City and then on into North Carolina.

== Junction list ==
The entire route is in Sullivan County.

Location	mi	km	Destinations	Notes
Bluff City	0.0	0.0	US 11E south / US 19W south (Volunteer Parkway/SR 34 west) / US 19E south (SR 37 south) – Johnson City, Elizabethton	US 19E and US 19W come together to form US 19; southern end of US 11E/SR 34 concurrency; northern terminus of unsigned SR 37
Bluff City	0.7– 0.9	1.1– 1.4	Charlie Worley Bridge over Boone Lake/South Fork Holston River	
Bristol	3.6	5.8	SR 394 / SR 390 south – Bluff City, Blountville, Bristol Motor Speedway	Diamond interchange; northern terminus of SR 390
Bristol	11.6	18.7	US 421 south (Anderson Street/SR 34 east) – Mountain City	Southern end of US 421 concurrency; northern end of SR 34 concurrency; eastern terminus of unsigned SR 1; southern end of unsigned SR 1 concurrency
Bristol	11.8	19.0	US 11E north / US 19 north / US 421 north (Commonwealth Avenue) / SR 1 west (State Street) – Bristol	Tennessee–Virginia state line at State Street; northern end of SR 1 concurrency
1.000 mi = 1.609 km; 1.000 km = 0.621 mi: Concurrency terminus

Preceded by 19E - 19W	U.S. Route 19; Tennessee	Succeeded by Virginia
