= Tennessee State Route 34 =

State highway in East Tennessee, U.S.

State Route 34

Route information
- Maintained by TDOT
- Length: 155.7 mi (250.6 km)
- Existed: October 1, 1923–present

Major junctions
- West end: US 70 / US 11E / US 25W in Carter
- SR 92 in Jefferson City; SR 66 in Morristown; US 25E in Morristown; I-81 in Mosheim; US 321 in Greeneville; I-26 / US 23 / US 19W in Johnson City; US 421 in Bristol
- East end: US 421 at the North Carolina state line near Trade

Location
- Country: United States
- State: Tennessee
- Counties: Knox, Jefferson, Hamblen, Hawkins, Greene, Washington, Sullivan, Johnson

Highway system
- Tennessee State Routes; Interstate; US; State
← SR 33	→ SR 35

State Route 34 (SR 34) is an unsigned state highway located in East Tennessee. The 155.7-mile-long (250.6 km) route traverses several cities through eight counties from the Knoxville area to the North Carolina state line via Greeneville and Bristol. The portion from Carter to Bristol is concurrent with U.S. Route 11E (US 11E) while the portion from Bristol to North Carolina is concurrent with US 421.

== Route description ==
SR 34 is a hidden route as it follows the routes of certain U.S. highways throughout its course. SR 34 begins with US 11E (Andrew Johnson Highway) east of Knoxville. It continues to follow that U.S. route through Jefferson City and Morristown. Continuing to concurrently with US 11E, SR 34 crosses Interstate 81 (I-81) and traverses Greeneville, Jonesborough, and then U.S. Route 19W (US 19W) joins in the concurrency starting with the US 23/I-26 exit 20 interchange in Johnson City. US 321 is also concurrent with SR 34 from Tusculum to Johnson City.

At Bluff City, US 19E merges with US 19W to make US 19 part of SR 34's concurrency with US 11E until it reaches Bristol. Just short of the Virginia state line, SR 34 joins US 421 eastbound to cross Holston Lake, goes through Mountain City, and terminates at the North Carolina state line near Trade.

SR 34 is primary, except for a small portion between SR 91 and SR 381 in Washington County.

Since 1994, a access-controlled bypass route of SR 34 in Greeneville has been proposed and studied by TDOT.

== Major intersections ==
County	Location	mi	km	Destinations	Notes
Knox	Carter	0.0	0.0	US 11E south / US 25W south / US 70 west / SR 9 (Asheville Highway)	Interchange; western end of US 11E concurrency
See US 11E (mile 8.1-120.1)
Sullivan	Bristol	112.1	180.4	US 11E north / US 19 north / US 421 north / SR 1 west (Volunteer Parkway) / Broad Street	Eastern end of US 11E / US 19 concurrences; western end of US 421 concurrency
See US 421 (mile 43.2-0.0)
Johnson		155.7	250.6	US 421 south – Boone	Eastern end of US 421 concurrency
1.000 mi = 1.609 km; 1.000 km = 0.621 mi: Concurrency terminus
