= Holston Valley, Tennessee =

Unincorporated community in Tennessee, US

Coordinates: 36.566°N 82.070°W

Holston Valley is an unincorporated community in eastern Sullivan County, Tennessee, United States. Holston Valley is located along U.S. Route 421 and State Route 44 southeast of Bristol.

== Education ==
Schools in Holston Valley are part of the Sullivan County Board of Education.

- Emmett Elementary - grades PreK–5
- Holston Valley Middle - grades 6-8

High school students in Holston Valley attend Sullivan East High School.
