= Bluff City, Tennessee =

Bluff City
- City
- Location of Bluff City in Sullivan County, Tennessee.
- Coordinates: 36°27′48″N 82°16′30″W
- Country: United States
- State: Tennessee
- County: Sullivan

Area
  - Total: 1.85 sq mi (4.80 km^{2})
  - Land: 1.75 sq mi (4.53 km^{2})
  - Water: 0.10 sq mi (0.27 km^{2})
- Elevation: 1,450 ft (442 m)

Population (2020)
  - Total: 1,822
  - Density: 1,042.8/sq mi (402.64/km^{2})
- Time zone: UTC-5 (Eastern (EST))
  - Summer (DST): UTC-4 (EDT)
- ZIP code: 37618
- Area code: 423
- FIPS code: 47-06960
- GNIS feature ID: 1305320
- Website: www.bluffcitytn.org

Bluff City is a city in Sullivan County, Tennessee. The population of this town according to the 2024 census is 1,839 occupants. It is part of the Kingsport-Bristol-Bristol, TN-VA Metropolitan Statistical Area, which is a component of the Johnson City-Kingsport-Bristol, TN-VA Combined Statistical Area, commonly known as the "Tri-Cities" region.

== History ==
Bluff City underwent several name changes before incorporating on July 1, 1887, under its present name. The town was originally known as Choate's Ford, and later took the name Middletown. After the East Tennessee, Virginia and Georgia Railroad was built, crossing the Holston River at the town site, the name Union was adopted. During the Civil War it was called Zollicoffer after Confederate General Felix Zollicoffer, but became Union again at the end of the war and until 1887.

== Geography ==
Bluff City is located at 36°27′48″N 82°16′30″W (36.463352, -82.275049).

According to the United States Census Bureau, the city has a total area of 1.6 square miles (4.1 km^{2}), of which 1.5 square miles (3.9 km^{2}) is land and 0.1 square miles (0.26 km^{2}) (3.21%) is water.

== Demographics ==
Historical population
| Census | Pop. | Note | %± |
|---|---|---|---|
| 1880 | 410 | | — |
| 1890 | 662 | | 61.5% |
| 1900 | 548 | | −17.2% |
| 1910 | 540 | | −1.5% |
| 1920 | 524 | | −3.0% |
| 1930 | 671 | | 28.1% |
| 1940 | 700 | | 4.3% |
| 1950 | 1,074 | | 53.4% |
| 1960 | 948 | | −11.7% |
| 1970 | 985 | | 3.9% |
| 1980 | 1,121 | | 13.8% |
| 1990 | 1,390 | | 24.0% |
| 2000 | 1,559 | | 12.2% |
| 2010 | 1,733 | | 11.2% |
| 2020 | 1,822 | | 5.1% |
| 2024 (est.) | 1,838 | | 0.9% |

=== 2020 census ===
As of the 2020 census, Bluff City had a population of 1,822 people in 800 households, including 541 families, and the median age was 39.2 years.

20.0% of residents were under the age of 18 and 16.7% were 65 years of age or older; for every 100 females there were 94.2 males, and for every 100 females age 18 and over there were 93.0 males.

There were 800 households in Bluff City, of which 31.6% had children under the age of 18 living in them. Of all households, 42.3% were married-couple households, 21.3% were households with a male householder and no spouse or partner present, and 28.1% were households with a female householder and no spouse or partner present. About 30.1% of all households were made up of individuals and 12.2% had someone living alone who was 65 years of age or older.

There were 881 housing units, of which 9.2% were vacant. The homeowner vacancy rate was 1.6% and the rental vacancy rate was 8.6%.

99.0% of residents lived in urban areas, while 1.0% lived in rural areas.

Racial composition as of the 2020 census
| Race | Number | Percent |
|---|---|---|
| White | 1,665 | 91.4% |
| Black or African American | 23 | 1.3% |
| American Indian and Alaska Native | 4 | 0.2% |
| Asian | 21 | 1.2% |
| Native Hawaiian and Other Pacific Islander | 0 | 0.0% |
| Some other race | 10 | 0.5% |
| Two or more races | 99 | 5.4% |
| Hispanic or Latino (of any race) | 27 | 1.5% |

=== 2000 census ===
As of the census of 2000, there was a population of 1,559, with 662 households and 450 families residing in the city. The population density was 1,029.2 inhabitants per square mile (397.4/km^{2}). There were 728 housing units at an average density of 480.6 per square mile (185.6/km^{2}). The racial makeup of the city was 98.52% White, 0.19% African American, 0.13% Native American, 0.58% Asian, and 0.58% from two or more races. Hispanic or Latino of any race were 0.71% of the population.

There were 662 households, out of which 29.2% had children under the age of 18 living with them, 52.6% were married couples living together, 11.3% had a female householder with no husband present, and 31.9% were non-families. 28.2% of all households were made up of individuals, and 11.0% had someone living alone who was 65 years of age or older. The average household size was 2.35 and the average family size was 2.84.

In the city, the population was spread out, with 23.0% under the age of 18, 9.0% from 18 to 24, 33.2% from 25 to 44, 22.8% from 45 to 64, and 11.9% who were 65 years of age or older. The median age was 35 years. For every 100 females, there were 91.1 males. For every 100 females age 18 and over, there were 86.3 males.

The median income for a household in the city was $31,587, and the median income for a family was $36,938. Males had a median income of $26,422 versus $19,957 for females. The per capita income for the city was $14,175. About 11.0% of families and 14.7% of the population were below the poverty line, including 26.3% of those under age 18 and 9.3% of those age 65 or over.

== Climate ==
Bluff City has relatively mild winters with hot and humid summers, moderated somewhat by its elevation, and there is adequate rainfall year-round. According to the Köppen Climate Classification system, Bluff City has a humid subtropical climate, abbreviated "Cfa” on climate maps.

== Police department ==
The town has a police department. On January 1, 2010, the department installed a speed camera on US Highway 11E that reportedly issued 1,662 tickets in its first six months. The town splits the revenue with the operator of the camera. In 2014, the town expected to gain less than $100,000 from the cameras. However the town's budget for FY 2017 reports expected "Speed Cameras" revenue of $600,000. This represents the largest single income line item for the city at 35% of total operating revenue.

In 2010, Gray, Tennessee resident Brian McCrary bought the former police department website after police failed to renew it. He used it to post information about fighting camera tickets. Police, lacking education on website matters, assumed they had been hacked. Negotiations to regain control of the domain name were unsuccessful.
