= Tennessee State Route 70 =

State highway in Tennessee, United States

State Route 70
- Trail of the Lonesome Pine
- SR 70; primary in red, secondary in blue

Route information
- Maintained by TDOT
- Length: 63.34 mi (101.94 km)
- Existed: October 1, 1923–present

Major junctions
- South end: NC 208 near South Greene
- US 321 / SR 107 / SR 350 at Greeneville; US 11E at Greeneville; I-81 near Romeo; US 11W at Rogersville
- North end: SR 70 near Kyles Ford

Location
- Country: United States
- State: Tennessee
- Counties: Greene, Hawkins, Hancock

Highway system
- Tennessee State Routes; Interstate; US; State
← US 70A	→ SR 71

State Route 70 (SR 70) is a state-maintained highway in East Tennessee, beginning at the border with North Carolina in the midst of the Cherokee National Forest and the Great Smoky Mountains and ending at the Virginia border in the extremely rural and mountainous terrain of Hancock County.

The highway travels through both Greeneville and Rogersville, bisecting Interstate 81 between the two towns.

== Route description ==
=== Greene County ===
SR 70 begins in Greene County as a primary highway at the North Carolina border, with the highway continuing as North Carolina Highway 208 (NC 208). It begins as a curvy two-lane highway, going through the mountains along the Tennessee - North Carolina border. It goes west, crossing the Appalachian Trail a few hundred feet across the border before going through some mountains before lowering down into the farmland of Greene County and turning north, straightening and widening into a two-lane rural highway with a speed limit of 55 miles per hour (89 km/h). SR 70 then enters the community of South Greene and coming to a Y-intersection with SR 107, becoming concurrent with that route. They then come to an intersection with SR 351 (which is also Tennessee State Route 107 Cutoff, an auxiliary Route of SR 107) before leaving South Greene at a crossing of the Nolichucky River, just a few yards away from the historic Nolichucky Dam and its reservoir, Davy Crockett Lake. SR 70/SR 107 continue north through some farmland before entering Greeneville. They go through some suburbs and pass by a few businesses before coming to an intersection with US 321/SR 35, with the SR 107 separating to follow that route northeast into downtown, all the while SR 70 completely bypasses downtown to the south. SR 70 then widens to four lanes, through undivided, and goes to intersect and become concurrent with US 11E Bus/SR 350, turning west. They then come to major interchange with US 11E/SR 34 (Andrew Johnson Highway), where US 11E Bus/SR 350 both end and SR 70 becomes concurrent with US 11E/SR 34, turning east as a four-lane divided highway, with the road continuing as Blue Springs Parkway (Old US 11E). Shortly afterwards, they come to another intersection, where SR 70 separates and turns north, returning to a two-lane highway and leaving Greeneville. It then becomes narrow and curvy again as it goes through more farmland. It then makes a sharp right turn at an intersection with a county road (Marvin Road) before continuing north for about two miles (3.2 km) before coming to an interchange with I-81 (Exit 30). It then come to a T-intersection with Horton Highway, a major county road the connects the highway to the town of Baileyton, the community of Fall Branch, and SR 93. It then turns left to go west around a mountain before going down a narrow valley before weaving through some mountains and crossing into Hawkins County.

=== Hawkins County ===
SR 70 then weaves through some more mountains before finally turning west to enter farmland again and widen and straighten into a two-lane rural highway with a speed limit of 55 miles per hour (89 km/h). It then intersects with Old Highway 70, the narrow and curvy former alignment of SR 70 through the area before it was realigned onto a new highway. It then continues west before entering and going through the town of Persia before coming to an intersection and becoming concurrent with SR 66, just north of that route's intersection with SR 113. They then go north and catch-up with the other end of Old Highway 70 before crossing a bridge over the Holston River/Cherokee Lake. They then enter Rogersville and pass through a business district and some neighborhoods before coming to an interchange with Main Street (Old US 11W), which connects the highway to downtown to the northeast as SR 66/SR 70 bypass it to the southwest. They then come to an interchange with US 11W/SR 1 (Lee Highway/Memphis to Bristol Highway), where SR 70 separates to become concurrent with US 11W/SR 1 to the northeast while SR 66 continues north as curvy and narrow secondary highway towards Sneedville. They then pass along the northern edge of downtown, as a four-lane divided highway, before coming to an interchange with SR 347 (Main Street/Old US 11W), where SR 347 ends and SR 70 separates to take over that route and it goes north as a narrow and curvy two-lane highway through both mountains and farmland before coming to an intersection with SR 94 (Pressmen's Home Road), which runs through the abandoned town of Pressmen's Home, before entering a long mountain pass over several mountains and ridges before crossing into Hancock County just north of the community of Edison.

=== Hancock County ===
SR 70 then winds its way along the banks of the Clinch River before crossing it along the historic Kyles Ford Bridge and entering Kyles Ford. It then immediately has an intersection and concurrency with SR 33 as they go through the heart of the community before separating with SR 33 turning southwest towards Sneedville while SR 70 continues north, becoming a secondary highway and going through some countryside before crossing the Virginia state line and continuing as Virginia State Route 70 (Trail of the Lonesome Pine) towards Jonesville.

== History ==
Throughout the highway's duration, and its companion route across the state line in Virginia, SR 70 is known and signed as Trail of the Lonesome Pine, with markers placed along the entire route, though they have not been maintained in many years and are now few and far between. This was done to commemorate the history of the highway as it was originally built as the Trail of the Lonesome Pine auto trail, an auto trail from Detroit to Florida. In 1924, a group of citizens from far western Virginia appeared before the Virginia State Highway Commission, asking them to take it over as a state highway. A member of the Tennessee Legislature stated that be was sure that it would be designated a state highway in Tennessee if Virginia took over their part, which happened in a period between 1924 and 1928.

== Junction list ==
County	Location	mi	km	Destinations	Notes
Greene		0.00	0.00	NC 208 south – Marshall, Asheville	Southern terminus of SR 70; SR 70 begins as a primary highway
Greene	South Greene			SR 107 west (Houston Valley Road) – Del Rio	Southern end of SR 107 concurrency
Greene	South Greene			SR 351 north (SR 107 Cutoff) – Tusculum, Erwin	Southern terminus of SR 351
Greene	South Greene			Oscar B. Lovette Bridge over Nolichucky River	
Greene	Greeneville			US 321 / SR 107 east (West Main Street/SR 35) – Newport, Downtown Greeneville	Northern End of concurrency with SR 107; Southern end of concurrency with US 321 Truck
Greene	Greeneville			US 11E Bus. north / SR 350 south (West Summer Street)	Southern end of concurrency with US 11E Business; Northern terminus of SR 350
Greene	Greeneville			US 11E south (West Andrew Johnson Highway/SR 34) – Mosheim, Bulls Gap, Morristown	Southern terminus of US 11E Business; Southern end of US 11E/SR 34 concurrency; Interchange, road continues west as Blue Springs Parkway
Greene	Greeneville			US 11E north / US 321 Truck north (West Andrew Johnson Highway/SR 34) – Tusculum, Jonesborough, Johnson City	Northern end of US 11E/US 321 Truck/SR 34 concurrency
Greene	Romeo			I-81 – Bristol, Knoxville	I-81 exit 30; interchange
Greene	Romeo			Horton Highway – Baileyton	
Hawkins	Persia			SR 66 south – Bulls Gap	Southern end of SR 66 concurrency
Hawkins	Persia			Hugh B. Day Bridge over Holston River	
Hawkins	Rogersville			West Main Street – Downtown Rogersville	Interchange; No access from southbound SR 66/SR 70
Hawkins	Rogersville			US 11W south (SR 1) – Mooresburg, Bean Station SR 66 north – Sneedville	Northern end of SR 66 concurrency; Southern end of US 11W/SR 1 concurrency; Interchange
Hawkins	Rogersville			US 11W north (SR 1) – Church Hill SR 347 east (East Main Street) – Downtown Rogersville, Sullivan Gardens	Northern end of US 11W/SR 1 concurrency; Western terminus of SR 347; Interchange
Hawkins				SR 94 west (Pressmen's Home Road) – Pressmen's Home	Eastern terminus of SR 94
Hancock	Kyles Ford			Colonel David B. Snodgrass Memorial Bridge	
Hancock	Kyles Ford			SR 33 north – Clinchport	Southern/Northern end of SR 33 wrong-way concurrency
Hancock	Kyles Ford			SR 33 south – Sneedville	Northern/Southern end of SR 33 wrong-way concurrency; SR 70 turns secondary
Hancock	Blackwater	63.3	101.9	SR 70 north (Trail of the Lonesome Pine Road) – Jonesville	Northern terminus of SR 70; SR 70 ends as a secondary highway
1.000 mi = 1.609 km; 1.000 km = 0.621 mi: Concurrency terminus; Incomplete access

== See also ==
- List of Tennessee state highways
