= U.S. Route 11W =

Suffixed section of U.S. Highway in Tennessee and Virginia in the United States

U.S. Route 11W

Route information
- Auxiliary route of US 11
- Length: 110.28 mi (177.48 km)
- Existed: June 3, 1929–present

Major junctions
- South end: US 11 / US 11E / US 70 in Knoxville, TN
- I-40 in Knoxville, TN; SR 61 in Blaine, TN; SR 92 in Rutledge, TN; US 25E in Bean Station, TN; SR 31 in Mooresburg, TN; SR 66 / SR 70 in Rogersville, TN; I-26 / US 23 in Kingsport, TN; SR 93 / SR 36 in Kingsport, TN; SR 394 in Blountville, TN; I-81 near Bristol, TN; SR 126 in Bristol, TN; US 421 at Tennessee–Virginia state line
- North end: US 11 / US 11E / US 19 / US 421 in Bristol, VA

Location
- Country: United States
- States: Tennessee, Virginia
- Counties: TN: Knox, Grainger, Hawkins, Sullivan; VA: City of Bristol

Highway system
- United States Numbered Highway System; List; Special; Divided
- Virginia Routes; Interstate; US; Primary; Secondary; Byways; History; HOT lanes
- Tennessee State Routes; Interstate; US; State
| ← US 11E | VA | → US 13 |
| ← US 11E | TN | → SR 11 |

U.S. Route 11W (US 11W) is the western branch of US 11 from the twin cities of Bristol, Tennessee/Bristol, Virginia, where US 11 splits into US 11E and US 11W, to Knoxville, Tennessee, where the two highways rejoin. The highway serves the Appalachia region's Ridge-and-Valley section of East Tennessee, bounded by the Clinch Mountain ridge to the north and the Holston River to the south. US 11W from Bristol to Bean Station and Blaine to Knoxville are designated as part of the National Highway System.

US 11W follows the original pathway of the Great Indian Warpath, a Native American trail used primarily by the Cherokee Nation, which inhabited the Holston River Valley of Tennessee and Virginia. In 1915, US 11W was designated as part of Tennessee State Route 1 (SR 1) in the Tennessee State Route System of the newly formed Tennessee Department of Highways and Public Works, the predecessor agency of the Tennessee Department of Transportation (TDOT). It would also be recognized as part of the Lee Highway, one of the earliest federal auto trails, in 1919. The route was officially established as US 11 with the creation of the U.S. Highway System in 1926.

Disputes between Tennessee state politicians and businessmen regarding designation of US 11 on the existing Lee Highway alignment and the paralleling US 511 south of US 11 resulted in the American Association of State Highway and Transportation Officials (AASHTO) renaming the existing US 11 to US 11W, and US 511 to US 11E in an event known as the "Tennessee Split" in 1929, which is still recognized despite attempted reversions by AASHTO in 1934.

By the mid-20th century, US 11W became known infamously as Bloody 11W due to the high number of severe and often fatal automobile collisions on the highway. In 1972, US 11W in Bean Station was the site of the deadliest vehicular accident in Tennessee history, prompting calls for the widening of the highway and the completion of Interstate 81 (I-81). Preliminary planning of I-81 considered using US 11W's alignment but was constructed south to meet with Interstate 40 (I-40). After I-81's completion, TDOT would widen sections of US 11W to aid economic development, such as the cancelled Phipps Bend Nuclear Plant project in Hawkins County, and to connect to the Appalachian Development Highway System's upgraded U.S. Route 25E (US 25E) in Bean Station. As of 2021, US 11W remains one of Tennessee's deadliest highways.

== Route description ==
Lengths
| | mi | km |
|---|---|---|
| TN | 109.16 | 175.68 |
| VA | 1.12 | 1.80 |
| Total | 110.28 | 177.48 |

=== Knoxville - Mascot area ===
In the East Knoxville area of Knoxville, US 11W begins at an incomplete Y interchange with the northern terminus of mainline US 11, the southern end of US 11E/US 70. US 11/US 70 continue west of US 11W as Magnolia Avenue toward the neighborhoods of Parkridge and Downtown Knoxville; US 11E/US 70 head east along Asheville Highway towards Strawberry Plains. US 11W heads northeast as Rutledge Pike as a four-lane divided highway that passes by Zoo Knoxville to the west, and then under Interstate 40 (I-40) at exit 392, a partial cloverleaf interchange (parclo). After exit 392, US 11W narrows to a four-lane undivided highway through a mixed-industrial-commercial corridor until reaching an underpass at I-640 (Knoxville Bypass) and US 25W. East of I-640, the highway overpasses Norfolk Southern Railway's (NS) Knoxville East District and enters an industrial area in the John Sevier neighborhood bounded to the south by the Holston River. In John Sevier, US 11W provides accessing the City of Knoxville's police training center, a NS rail yard, and a Cemex concrete plant and quarry. US 11W exits the city limits of Knoxville near the Poplar Landfill facility, and enters unincorporated east Knox County between the community of Mascot and the Holston River to the south, and House Mountain to the north. It continues for this remainder of the route as a four-lane undivided highway, passing by East Knox Elementary School, and exits Knox County.

=== Grainger County ===
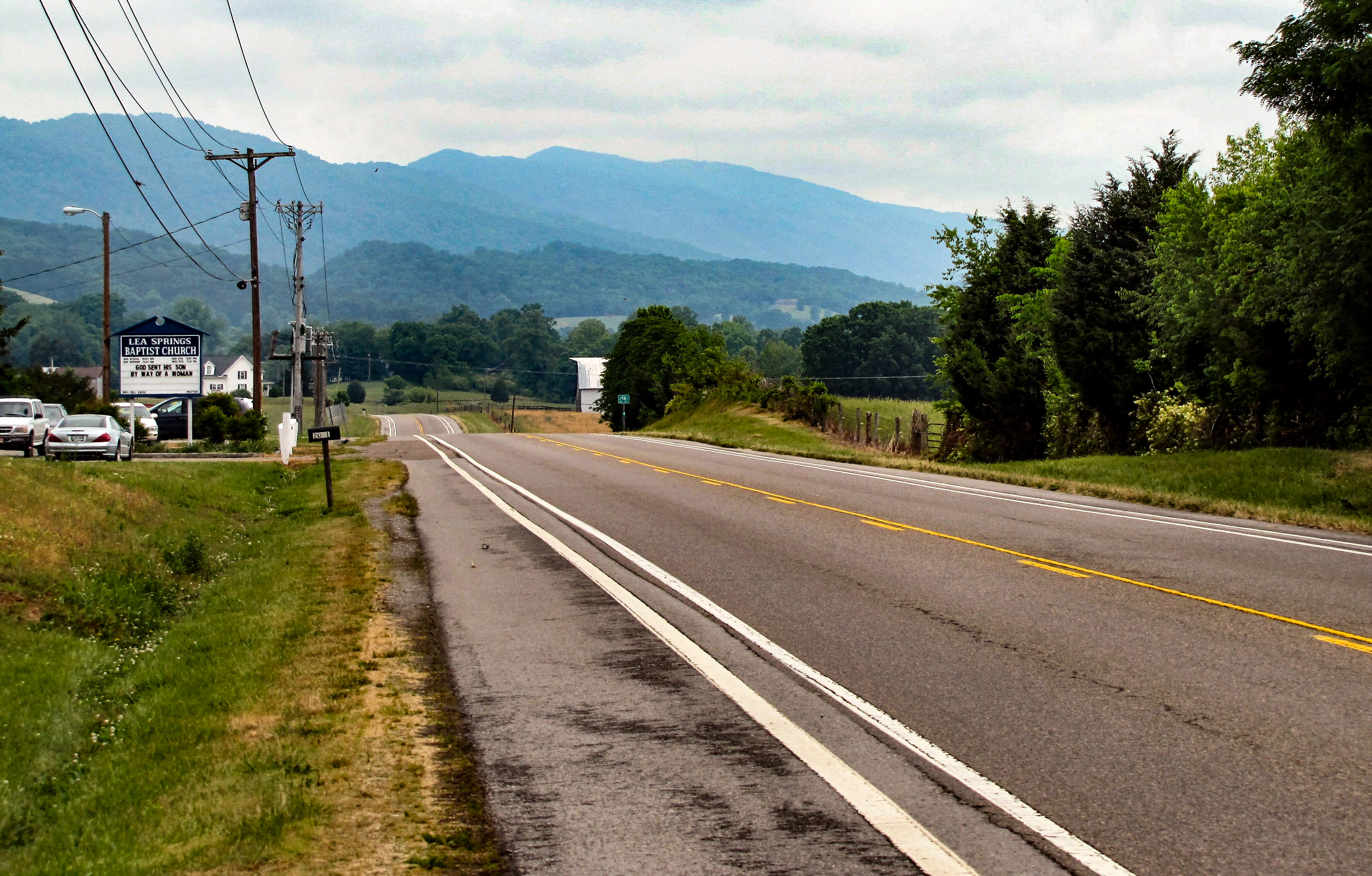
Two-lane US 11W looking northeast near Lea Springs; Joppa Mountain, a peak on the Clinch Mountain ridge rises in the distance.

US 11W enters the city limits of Blaine at the Knox–Grainger county border, and transitions from a four-lane divided highway to an undivided five lane with sidewalk facilities providing access to Blaine's central business district and retail areas. It meets SR 61 (Emory Road) at a signalized intersection and reduces to a two-lane highway exiting the eastern city limits of Blaine at the unincorporated community of Lea Springs. Northeast of Lea Springs, US 11W parallels Richland Creek through the Richland Valley between the Richland Knobs to the south, and the Poor Valley Knobs to the north. US 11W continues through low-lying farmland and reaches the unincorporated community of Joppa and its elementary school. At Joppa, US 11W provides connections to Powder Springs via Joppa Mountain Road, one of two roadway crossings of the Poor Valley sub ridge of Clinch Mountain in Grainger County with the other being US 25E between Thorn Hill and Bean Station.

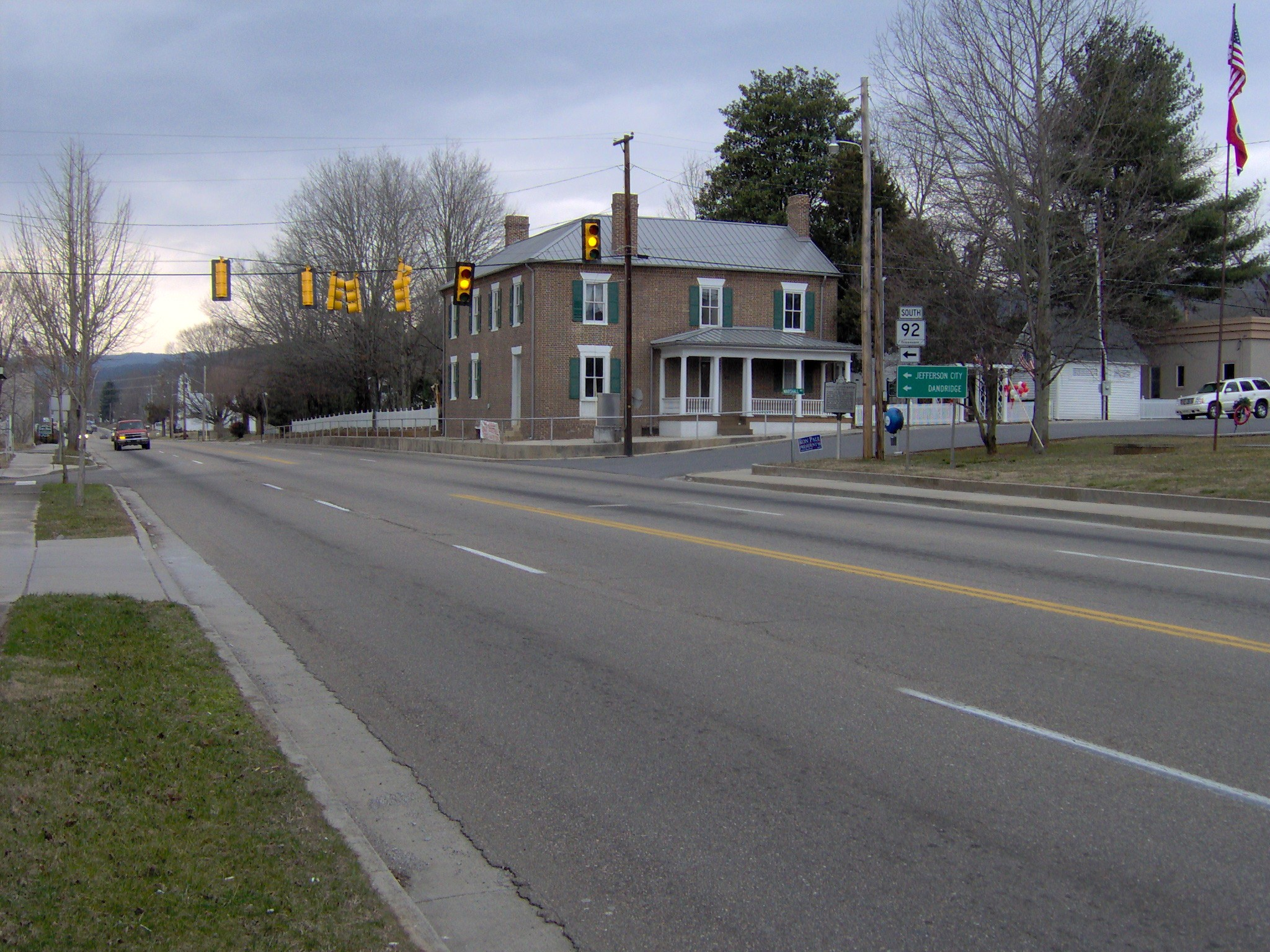
US 11W at the signalized intersection of SR 92 in downtown Rutledge.

US 11W exits Joppa and continues northeast through the Richland Valley, and meets the northern terminus of Owl Hole Gap Road, a county-owned collector route that provides access to SR 92 near the terminus of SR 375 at Cherokee Dam. Just east of Owl Hole Gap Road, US 11W enters the shoestringed city limits of Rutledge, the county seat of Grainger County. US 11W traverses through rugged forested land to the south and rolling farmland to the north until the intersection of Bryan Road where its forks off from Richland Creek. US 11W soon enters the central business district and commercial areas of Rutledge passing the Rutledge Middle-Elementary school complex to the south, and meets the northern terminus of SR 92 at a signalized intersection at the Grainger County Courthouse, picking up the Lee Highway designation. US 11W exits the city limits of Rutledge near a Clayton Homes manufacturing plant.

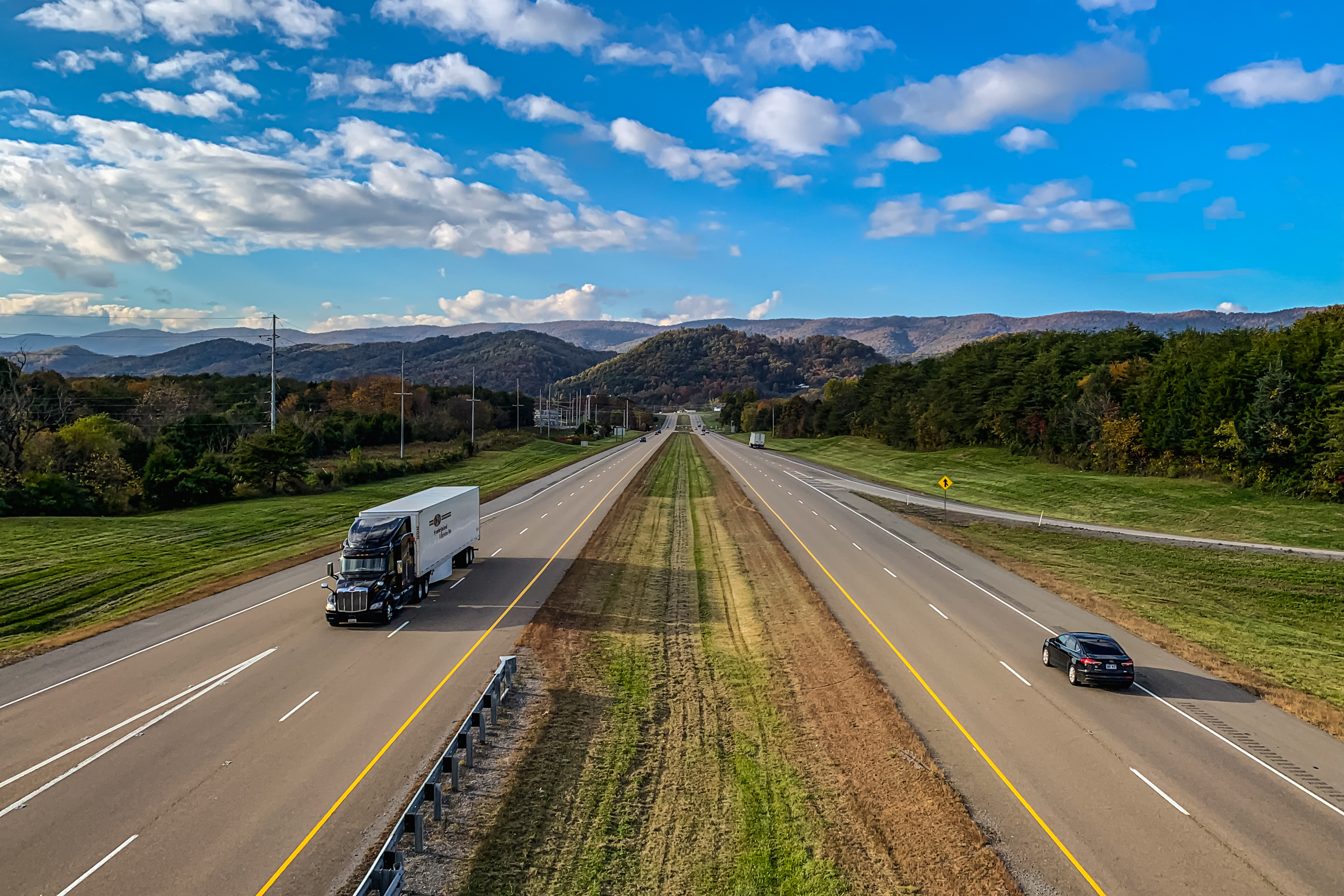
US 11W near its southern concurrency terminus with US 25E in Bean Station.

Continuing northeast, US 11W passes through more farmland and enters the unincorporated community of Avondale, where it provides access to Grainger High School. It meets the Cherokee Lake impoundment of Shields Creek at the intersection of Helton Road, another county-owned collector that accesses SR 375, and the Grainger County Industrial Park. East of Helton Road, US 11W parallels the northernmost shoreline of Cherokee Lake surrounded by farmland and lakefront residential neighborhoods. US 11W then meets the former alignment of US 25E near the former settlement site of Bean Station, and heads east passing more lakefront residential neighborhoods. US 11W then enters the westernmost town limits of Bean Station at Bean Station Elementary School and the former Tate Springs resort site, and its respective neighborhood. East of Tate Springs, US 11W then widens to a four-lane divided highway at Briar Fork Creek immediately meets US 25E (Appalachian Highway) at an incomplete semi-directional T interchange, where it begins a brief concurrency with US 25E as Appalachian Highway. US 11W/US 25E passes through western Bean Station bounded to the south by Cherokee Lake and a highway-oriented commercial area to the north until reaching Main Street, a former alignment of US 11W. Past Main Street, US 11W/US 25E dips briefly southeast until reaching a trumpet interchange, where US 11W ends its concurrency with US 25E, which continues south towards Morristown. US 11W heads northeast as Lee Highway again through Bean Station's central business district, where it meets Broadway Drive, a former alignment of US 25E at a signalized intersection. East of Broadway Drive, US 11W transitions from a four-lane divided highway to a five-lane for the rest of its duration in the city limits/central business area of Bean Station and Grainger County. Entering Hawkins County, it enters the unincorporated community and census-designated place of Mooresburg.

=== Hawkins County ===
US 11W begins its journey in Hawkins County as four-lane median divided expressway through rolling farmland in the Mooresburg Valley and meets an old alignment of the highway at a forested area, where the old alignment veers north towards the developed core of Mooresburg. US 11W passes by more farmland and meets the southern terminus of SR 31 (Flat Gap Road), which provides access to Sneedville from US 11W. East of Flat Gap Road, US 11W passes over the Cherokee Lake impoundment of Poor Valley Creek at the base of Short Mountain. After crossing Poor Valley Creek, the highway begins to parallel the Holston River to the south and Short Mountain on the north. In the unincorporated community of Galibrath Springs, US 11W provides access to a silica mining facility at Short Mountain, and several lakefront RV campgrounds.

The highway separates from the Holston River at the community of Lakeview between Short Mountain to the north and Potato Hill to the south and passes through valley farmland. It enters the historic quarry town of Marble Hall in the Caney Valley and passes over the Cherokee Lake impoundments of Cloud and Caney creeks. US 11W curves southeast into the valley of Crockett Creek and intersects the northern end of SR 344 (Melinda Ferry Road) on its way to Rogersville, the county seat of Hawkins County.

At the western end of town, US 11W picks up the Rogersville Bypass designation and transitions from a four-lane median divided expressway to a five-lane undivided highway, passing by several residential neighborhoods and the Rogersville Industrial Park. It is soon bounded by the Town Knobs to the north and Caney Creek to the south. After meeting Main Street, a former alignment of US 11W, the highway passes under SR 66 and SR 70 (Trail of the Lonesome Pine) at a partial cloverleaf interchange; SR 70 joins US 11W in a concurrency, bypassing Rogersville's historic downtown district and most of its commercial area, aside from an at-grade signalized intersection at Park Boulevard. US 11W/SR 70 transitions back into a four-lane median-divided highway, picks up the Lee Highway designation again, and meet the northern terminus of SR 347 (Burton Road) at an interchange, where SR 70 also splits north towards Kyles Ford.

Exiting Rogersville, US 11W briefly parallels Big Creek around Bunker Hill in Carters Valley through more rolling farmland, before intersecting Carter Valley Road, a county collector route, and the western terminus of SR 346 (Main Street), which directly serves as the main throughfare in Surgoinsville while US 11W bypasses to the north of the town, bounded by forested to the south and farmland to the north. At Stony Point, US 11W intersects Phipps Bend Road, an industrial access road to the Phipps Bend Industrial Park just outside the eastern city limits of Surgoinsville. The highway passes through more farmland, parallels Norfolk Southern's Knoxville East District rail-line, intersects SR 346, and begins an unsigned concurrency with the former as it enters the western city limits of Church Hill. It meets AFG Road, an industrial access road to a large industrial area including a Cardinal Glass manufacturing plant and a Averitt Express trucking terminal.

Entering further into Church Hill, US 11W/SR 346 passes Volunteer High School to the north and industrial facilities to the south on Kingsport Press Road, and traverses by residential neighborhoods in the New Canton community part of Church Hill. It passes through forested land and Church Hill's water treatment plant to the south, until reaching an overpass of the Norfolk Southern Knoxville East District rail line. It immediately intersects Goshen Valley Road, a county collector road, to the south and Main Street, an old alignment of US 11W, to the north. SR 346 breaks away from US 11W and continues as Main Street. US 11W continues east through more forested land until reaching a commercialized area at the signalized intersection of Central Avenue. It passes through more farmland and meets another commercial area at Garland Avenue. Eastward, it intersects Hawkins Avenue, where US 11W transitions from a fully rural corridor into a more suburbanized corridor. It has one last major signalized intersection at Silver Lake Road, where it accesses several retail centers and residential complexes. It is then bordered by Main Street and the Norfolk Southern Knoxville East rail line to the north, and undeveloped forest land owned by the U.S. federal government. It exits Church Hill at the western town limits of Mount Carmel, and soon encounters an overpass of a railroad spur. Entering Mount Carmel, the highway has its first major intersection at Englewood Avenue, where accesses residential neighborhoods to the north and a National Guard center to the south. It soon meets another signalized intersection at Hammond Avenue, which provides access to the main area of Mount Carmel, including its town hall and post office. At the intersection of Haywood Avenue, Main Street terminuses back into US 11W and enters the western city limits of Kingsport.

=== Kingsport area ===
Entering Kingsport, US 11W picks up the name Stone Drive (specifically West Stone Drive), continuing as a four-lane divided highway and has its first major intersection in the city at University Boulevard, which provides access to the Holston Army Ammunition Plant to the south, and a satellite campus of East Tennessee State University and several commercial/residential areas to the north. It passes Allandale Mansion to the north, and has a signalized intersection at Lewis Lane, providing access to more commercial areas. It then immediately intersects Netherland Inn Road, a previous alignment of US 11W, to the south. East of Netherland Inn Road, US 11W passes over the North Fork Holston River, just north of its confluence with the South Fork to form the Holston River proper, on a T-beam bridge. It then goes under a railroad bridge carrying the Kingsport Subdivision of CSX Transportation. It then has two signalized intersections providing access to a Walmart-anchored shopping center and Hunter Wright Stadium, home of the Minor League Baseball Kingsport Axmen, to the north, and the Fort Robinson/Rivermont neighborhood to the south.

It then meets Union Street, a city/county collector route at a signalized intersection, and then meets US 23 (James H. Quillen Parkway) at a partial cloverleaf interchange (parclo); this interchange is also the western terminus of I-26. East of the interchange, the highway has another signalized intersection at Fairview Avenue, a city collector route, and becomes a six-lane undivided surface arterial road with a continuous left turn lane in the Sevier Terrace neighborhood of North Kingsport. It then meets SR 36 (Lynn Garden Drive), an old alignment of US 23 at another parclo. US 11W continues north of downtown Kingsport and meets Clinchfield Street, a downtown collector street, to the south and Bloomingdale Pike, a county collector route to the Bloomingdale community to the north at a signalized intersection. It then passes the Bloomington Heights neighborhood to the north and Holston Valley Medical Center to the south, which US 11W provides access to the latter to via a signalized intersection at Gibson Mill Road. East of Gibson Mill Road, US 11W becomes East Stone Drive, the major commercial thoroughfare in Kingsport. As East Stone Drive, US 11W is bounded by Reedy Creek to the south and commercial development on both sides of the highway. It has one major signalized intersection on the corridor at North Eastman Road, a city collector to Eastman Chemical Company's headquarters and main operations facilities. Eastward, US 11W meets SR 93 (John B. Dennis Highway), a southern controlled-access bypass of Kingsport, at another parclo.

Map of northern junction of US 11W, US 11E, and US 11 in Bristol, Virginia

US 11W follows Reedy Creek through the hamlet of Mill Point, where the highway intersects the northern end of SR 394, which heads southeast toward the Sullivan County seat of Blountville. Just west of Bristol, the U.S. Highway meets I-81 at a seven-ramp cloverleaf interchange. The movement from southbound US 11W to northbound I-81 is made via a ramp just south of where I-81 enters Virginia. US 11W continues east as State Street into the city of Bristol, where the highway meets the northern end of SR 126 (Blountville Highway). The U.S. Highway meets the state line at an oblique angle where the highway intersects US 421 (Gate City Highway) and SR 1, which heads east as a solo highway as State Street to its eastern terminus in the Bristol Commercial Historic District. US 11W and US 421 head northeast as Euclid Avenue through the independent city of Bristol. The highways pass DeVault Memorial Stadium, home of the Bristol Pirates, and crosses a rail line at grade before US 11W reaches its northern terminus at Commonwealth Avenue. Southbound Commonwealth Avenue carries southbound US 11E, US 19, and US 421. State Route 381 follows the north–south boulevard through the intersection; the state highway becomes I-381, a spur south from I-81, a short distance to the north. Euclid Avenue continues east as mainline US 11 and US 19.

== History ==
=== Native American and pioneer era ===
Before its establishment as US 11W, the pathway that it followed was previously used as parts of the Great Indian Warpath, Great Stagecoach Road, and Lee Highway.

=== The "Tennessee Split" ===
In 1926, US 11W was originally established as part of US 11. This angered many local government and business representatives along US 511 (US 11E), prompting demand from then Tennessee Governor Austin Peay to have US 11 become a divided highway from Knoxville to Bristol. Tennessee officials proposed for this change to the American Association of State Highway Officials (AASHO) in 1929, and AASHO approved the split on June 3 of that year, with US 11 becoming US 11W and US 511 becoming US 11E. This would later be known as the "Tennessee Split".

In 1934, following the discontinuation of split routes by AASHO, the US 11 split had ended. US 11W was recognized as US 11 again by the federal government and US 11E was reassigned to be part of US 411, a route that exists in Tennessee south of the split section of US 11. However, AASHO had no way to enforce the elimination of the Tennessee Split. Tennessee officials never removed signage of US 11W and US 11E recognizing them as such, and state maps had still acknowledged the Tennessee Split.

In 1952, unable to have Tennessee enforce the change, AASHO designated US 11 as US 11W and US 411 as US 11E again to eliminate differences between federal and state records and maps. The split of US 11W and US 11E is still recognized as of 2020.

During preliminary planning of the Interstate Highway System in the 1950s, it was suggested that Interstate 81 (I-81) follow the corridor of US 11W from Knoxville to Bristol, but residents of Grainger County were opposed to this. The planners ultimately chose a routing between both US 11W and 11E. Unlike many stretches of Interstate Highway, this section of I-81 does not closely parallel a US Highway, and US 11W and 11E remained important highways after I-81's completion in 1975.

=== Mid-to-late 20th century ===
The first major section of US 11W to be widened to four lanes was the stretch between Kingsport and Bristol. The final section, 7.1 miles (11.4 km) between Mill Point and Bristol, was declared complete on November 21, 1959.

In September 1965, a 3.473-mile (5.589 km) two-lane bypass with interchanges at SR 66 and SR 70 around the town of Rogersville in Hawkins County started construction. It was opened on January 12, 1967, realigning US 11W from its existing alignment through Rogersville's central business district. An 8.2-mile (13.2 km) four-lane bypass of Church Hill and Mount Carmel between the Kingsport Press plant in New Canton and the Holston Army Ammunition Plant in Kingsport saw construction work start in the fall of 1967 and was dedicated and opened on August 28, 1970, more than one year behind schedule.

In 1973, TDOT started work on widening US 11W in Rutledge through its downtown. Rutledge officials petitioned the state to make the four-lane on a bypass route around the city. Work on a 12.54-mile (20.18 km) section for a realigned four-lane US 11W between the existing four-lane bypass of Rogersville to east of Stony Point, bypassing the town of Surgoinsville, was let to contract in two sections in December 1973 and the spring of 1974. It was completed and dedicated on October 5, 1978. Work on this section was prioritized in coordination with the Tennessee Valley Authority for their then under-construction Phipps Bend nuclear power facility, who supplied additional funding for the Surgoinsville bypass and several industrial access roads from the nuclear power plant to US 11W.

=== Bloody 11W ===
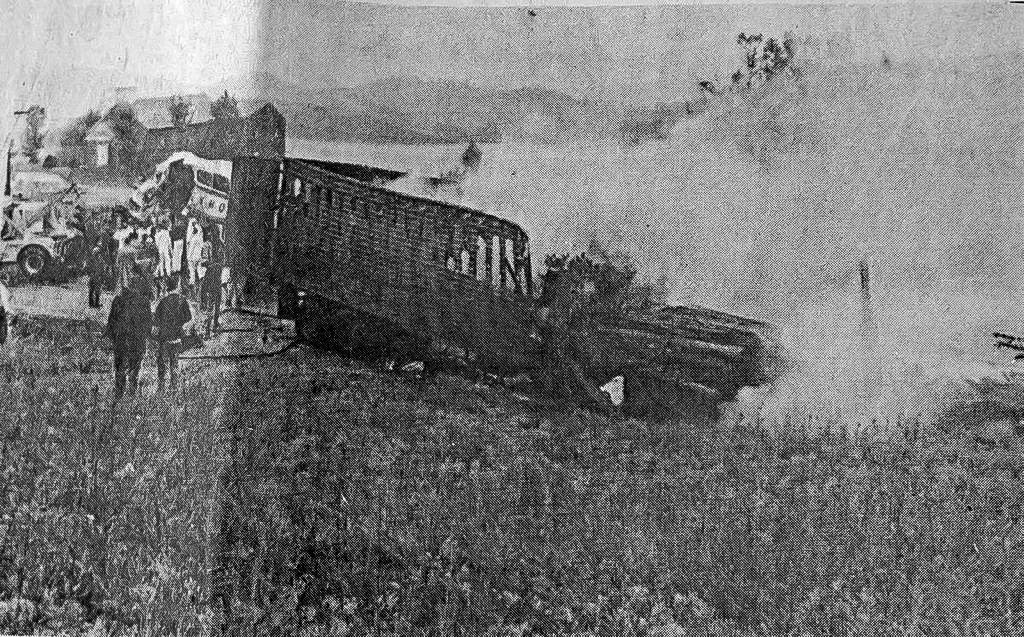
Aftermath of 1972 bus–truck collision in Bean Station on US 11W

Because of the highway having a history with a high rate of accidents and fatalities throughout several decades, US 11W has garnered the nickname Bloody 11W. The stretch of US 11W between Knoxville and Bristol has been labeled as one of the most dangerous stretches of highway in the state of Tennessee.

On May 13, 1972, 14 people were killed and 15 were injured in a head-on collision between a double-decker Greyhound bus and a tractor-trailer on US 11W in Bean Station, becoming one of the worst vehicular collisions in the state of Tennessee and topping headlines nationwide.

In 1973, following the deadly bus–semitruck collision in Bean Station, the Tennessee Senate and House of Representatives authorized the formation of special joint investigation committee into US 11W's ill-fated past. Joint committee members billed US 11W as one of the "killer highways" of the U.S., having been responsible for 1,068 collisions and 35 fatalities in a single year. The committee held several public forums in cities along the US 11W corridor, including Knoxville, Rutledge, Rogersville, and Kingsport.

Attendees of the forums had brought up several statements concerning US 11W, such as the highway being possibly cursed. Regarding the completion of I-81 or the widening of parallel route US 11E, some attendees suggested that it was not enough:

"Two four lane highways are needed in that area, and I think you’re kidding yourself when you say that to complete I-40 is going to relieve the congestion on 11W because it’s not going to do it."

Plans and funding for the widening of US 11W from Bristol to Knoxville were established in 1973; however, several state and local representatives across various districts in Grainger and Hawkins counties have refused the aid of the state government. After the completion of I-81, congestion and the accident count on US 11W decreased, but many still called for the widening of the highway, citing its hazardous design in Grainger and Hawkins counties.

As of 2020, US 11W has since been widened to four or five lanes, except for the nearly 30-mile (48 km) stretch between Blaine and Bean Station, including where the 1972 bus–truck collision had occurred. It is suggested that NIMBYism from citizens in Grainger County has played a significant role in the prevention and postponement of the highway construction.

=== Recent history ===
In 2020, the Tennessee Department of Transportation (TDOT) had begun the right-of-way acquisition phase of the US 11W widening project between Rutledge and Bean Station. The section of US 11W between Blaine and Rutledge has not been planned for widening but studies by TDOT have suggested completion of a four-lane US 11W in order to provide safe alternative routes along the I-81/I-40 corridor region for alleviating congestion on these Interstates.

== In popular culture ==
- In 1973, the incident was the basis of a song recorded and written by country-western singer Jim McGinnis.
- In 1982, country music songwriter Ronnie Rogers recalled being inspired to write the Alabama hit single "Dixieland Delight" while driving on US 11W near the town of Rutledge in Grainger County.

== Major intersections ==
| State | County | Location | mi | km | Destinations | Notes |
|---|---|---|---|---|---|---|
| Tennessee | Knox | Knoxville | 0.00 | 0.00 | US 11 south / US 70 west (Magnolia Avenue/SR 1 west) – Chilhowee Park, Zoo Knoxville | Interchange; southern end of SR 1 overlap; US 11E south and US 11W merge into US 11 |
| Tennessee | Knox | Knoxville | 0.00 | 0.00 | US 11E north / US 70 east (Asheville Highway/SR 168) | Interchange; northbound entrance only |
| Tennessee | Knox | Knoxville | 0.5 | 0.80 | I-40 – Asheville, Downtown | I-40 exit 392 |
| Tennessee | Grainger | Blaine | 15.0 | 24.1 | SR 61 west – Luttrell, Maynardville | Eastern terminus of SR 61 |
| Tennessee | Grainger | Rutledge | 29.0 | 46.7 | SR 92 south – Cherokee Dam, Jefferson City, Dandridge | Northern terminus of SR 92 |
| Tennessee | Grainger | Bean Station | 40.4 | 65.0 | US 25E north (SR 32) – Tazewell | Interchange; southern end of US 25E / SR 32 overlap |
| Tennessee | Grainger | Bean Station | 43.1 | 69.4 | US 25E south (SR 32) – Morristown | Interchange; northern end of US 25E / SR 32 overlap |
| Tennessee | Hawkins | Mooresburg | 46.9 | 75.5 | SR 31 north – Sneedville | Southern terminus of SR 31 |
| Tennessee | Hawkins | | 57.1 | 91.9 | SR 344 south (Melinda Ferry Road) – Saint Clair | Northern terminus of SR 344 |
| Tennessee | Hawkins | Rogersville | | | West Main Street – Downtown Business District | Former US 11W/SR 1 |
| Tennessee | Hawkins | Rogersville | 60.2 | 96.9 | SR 66 / SR 70 south – Sneedville, Bulls Gap | Interchange; Southern end of SR 70 overlap |
| Tennessee | Hawkins | Rogersville | 63.0 | 101.4 | SR 70 north / SR 347 east – Sneedville, Pressmen's Home | Interchange; Northern end of SR 70 overlap; Western terminus of SR 347 |
| Tennessee | Hawkins | Surgoinsville | 68.3 | 109.9 | SR 346 north (Main Street) – Airport, Surgoinsville | Southern terminus of SR 346 |
| Tennessee | Hawkins | Surgoinsville | 74.9 | 120.5 | SR 346 south – Surgoinsville | Southern end of unsigned SR 346 overlap |
| Tennessee | Hawkins | Church Hill | 79.5 | 127.9 | SR 346 north (Gray Brothers Store Road to Main Blvd) / Goshen Valley Road | Northern end of unsigned SR 346 overlap |
| Tennessee | Hawkins–Sullivan county line | Kingsport | 86.0– 86.2 | 138.4– 138.7 | Bridge over the North Fork Holston River | |
| Tennessee | Sullivan | Kingsport | 87.9 | 141.5 | I-26 east / US 23 / SR 137 north – Gate City, Johnson City | I-26 exit 1; western terminus of I-26; southern terminus of SR 137 |
| Tennessee | Sullivan | Kingsport | 88.7 | 142.7 | SR 36 (Lynn Garden Drive) | Interchange |
| Tennessee | Sullivan | Kingsport | 92.2 | 148.4 | SR 93 (John B Dennis Highway) – Bloomingdale, Greeneville | Interchange |
| Tennessee | Sullivan | Mill Point | 101.5 | 163.3 | SR 394 east to I-81 – Blountville | Western terminus of SR 394 |
| Tennessee | Sullivan | Bristol | 107.2 | 172.5 | I-81 – Roanoke, Knoxville | I-81 exit 74 |
| Tennessee | Sullivan | Bristol | 109.4 | 176.1 | SR 126 west (Blountville Highway) – Blountville, Steele Creek Park | Eastern terminus of SR 126 |
| Tennessee–Virginia state line | | | 110.0 0.00 | 177.0 0.00 | US 421 north (Gate City Highway) / West State Street (SR 1 east) | Northern end of SR 1 overlap; southern end of US 421 overlap |
| Virginia | City of Bristol | | 1.12 | 1.80 | US 11 / US 19 north (Euclid Avenue) / US 11E / US 421 south / US 11 Truck / US 19 Truck (Commonwealth Avenue / SR 381) to I-81 / I-381 | Northern end of US 421 overlap; US 11E north and US 11W merge into US 11 |
1.000 mi = 1.609 km; 1.000 km = 0.621 mi: Concurrency terminus; Incomplete access; Route transition

| Preceded by Tennessee | U.S. Route 11; US 11W; US 11E | Succeeded by Virginia |
