= Tennessee State Route 347 =

Highway in Tennessee

State Route 347
- TN 347 highlighted in red

Route information
- Maintained by TDOT
- Length: 31.3 mi (50.4 km)
- Existed: July 1, 1983–present

Major junctions
- West end: US 11W / SR 70 at Rogersville
- SR 93 at Sullivan Gardens
- East end: I-26 / US 23 at Kingsport

Location
- Country: United States
- State: Tennessee
- Counties: Sullivan, Hawkins

Highway system
- Tennessee State Routes; Interstate; US; State
← SR 346	→ SR 348

State Route 347 (SR 347) is a state-maintained, secondary highway in eastern Tennessee, beginning at I-26 in the Rock Springs community of Kingsport and ending at the intersection of US 11W and SR 70 in Rogersville.

The highway travels through a gap in Bays Mountain at the border between Sullivan and Hawkins counties.

== Route description ==
SR 347 begins as East Main Street at an intersection with SR 70 and US 11W in Rogersville, SR 347 goes southwest toward downtown and after 1 mile as East Main Street SR 347 turns east on to Burem Pike and soon after leaves Rogersville city limits and after traveling for at total of 3.5 miles SR 347 crosses the Holston River. It then goes through rural southern Hawkins County. After entering Sullivan County SR 347 comes into the community of Sullivan Gardens and junctions with SR 93 and comes to an end at I-26/US 23 in Kingsport.

== Major intersections ==
County	Location	mi	km	Destinations	Notes
Hawkins	Rogersville	0.00	0.00	US 11W south (Lee Highway/SR 1 west) / SR 70 (Trail of the Lonesome Pine) – Bean Station, Mooresburg, Sneedville, Pressmen's Home	Western terminus; Interchange
Hawkins	Rogersville			East Main Street to US 11W north (Lee Highway/SR 1 east) – Surgoinsville, Kingsport	
Hawkins	Rogersville			East Main Street To SR 66 – Downtown Rogersville	
Hawkins	Van Hill			Van Hill Road To I-81 / SR 172 (Baileyton Road) – Baileyton, Greeneville	Former northern terminus of SR 172
Sullivan	Sullivan Gardens			SR 93 (Sullivan Gardens Parkway) – Kingsport, Fall Branch	
Sullivan	Kingsport			I-26 / US 23 – Gate City, Johnson City	I-26/US 23 exit 6; eastern terminus
1.000 mi = 1.609 km; 1.000 km = 0.621 mi

== See also ==
- List of Tennessee state highways
