= Tennessee State Route 94 =

State highway in Tennessee, United States

State Route 94
- SR 94 highlighted in red

Route information
- Maintained by TDOT
- Length: 8.1 mi (13.0 km)

Major junctions
- West end: SR 66 northwest of Rogersville
- East end: SR 70 north of Rogersville

Location
- Country: United States
- State: Tennessee
- Counties: Hawkins

Highway system
- Tennessee State Routes; Interstate; US; State
← SR 93	→ SR 95

State Route 94 (SR 94) is an 8.1-mile-long (13.0 km) state highway in rural northern Hawkins County in the northeastern portion of the U.S. state of Tennessee. SR 94 serves as a connector from SR 66 to SR 70 and provides access to the former town of Pressmen's Home.

A "massive landslide" in 2019 blocked a section of Route 94.

== Route description ==
SR 94 begins in rural northern Hawkins County at an intersection with SR 66. It continues to the east, and, about 2.4 miles (3.9 km) from SR 66, it becomes a divided two-lane road, with tall pine trees in the center median. The divided section is about 1.3 miles (2.1 km) long. During the divided section, SR 94 passes Camelot Country Club and the former town of Pressmen's Home, the former headquarters of the International Printing Pressmen and Assistants' Union of North America. Just past Pressmen's Home, the divided section ends and curves around and passes close to Pressmen's Home Lake. The route then becomes more curvy and it meets its eastern terminus, an intersection with SR 70, north of Rogersville.

== Major intersections ==
The entire route is in Hawkins County.

Location	mi	km	Destinations	Notes
	0	0.0	SR 66 – Sneedville, Rogersville	Western terminus
	8.1	13.0	SR 70 – Rogersville, Eidson, Kyles Ford, Blackwater	Eastern terminus
1.000 mi = 1.609 km; 1.000 km = 0.621 mi

== See also ==
- List of state routes in Tennessee
