= Virginia State Route 70 =

State highway in Lee County, Virginia, US

State Route 70

Route information
- Maintained by VDOT
- Length: 11.88 mi (19.12 km)
- Existed: 1940–present
- Tourist routes: Virginia Byway

Major junctions
- South end: SR 70 near Kyles Ford, TN
- North end: US 58 in Jonesville

Location
- Country: United States
- State: Virginia
- Counties: Lee

Highway system
- Virginia Routes; Interstate; US; Primary; Secondary; Byways; History; HOT lanes
← SR 69	→ SR 71

State Route 70 (SR 70) is a primary state highway in Lee County, Virginia, running from the Tennessee state line to U.S. Route 58 in Jonesville. Its continuation in Tennessee, also numbered State Route 70, continues south to the North Carolina state line at North Carolina Highway 208.

== Route description ==
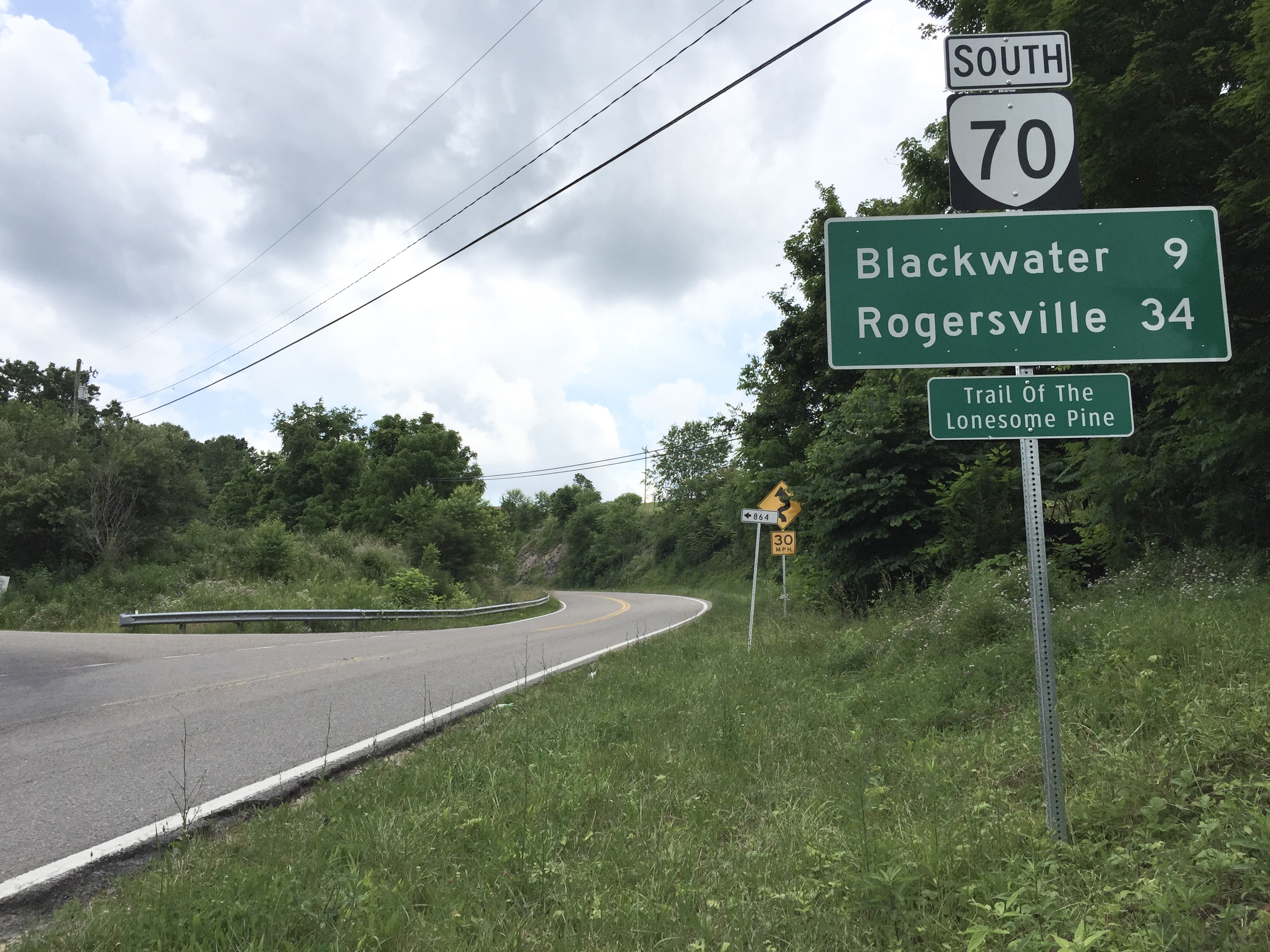
View south at the north end of SR 70 at US 58 in Jonesville

SR 70 begins at the Tennessee state line in the valley formed by Blackwater Creek. It follows that creek past Blackwater, but soon leaves it to ascend Powell Mountain, which it crosses at Hunter Gap. SR 70 comes down off that mountain and then rises again, crossing Wallen Ridge before descending again and crossing the Powell River on Sewell Bridge. From there it heads north across a relatively flat area, ending at US 58 in the eastern part of Jonesville.

== History ==
The road from Jonesville south via Blackwater to Tennessee was part of the Trail of the Lonesome Pine, an auto trail from Detroit to Florida. In 1924, a group of citizens from far western Virginia appeared before the State Highway Commission, asking them to take it over as a state highway. A member of the Tennessee Legislature stated that be was sure that it would be designated a state highway in Tennessee if Virginia took over their part. The northernmost two miles (3 km) were added later in 1924 as SR 1010, and a further 8 miles (13 km) were added in 1927. SR 1010 was renumbered to SR 103 in the 1928 renumbering, and the final 3.5-mile (5.5 km) piece from Blackwater to Tennessee was added that year.

In the 1933 renumbering, SR 103 south of Jonesville was combined with the remaining piece of SR 11, which ran from Jonesville northeast to Lebanon along present U.S. Route 58 Alternate (and its old alignments) and SR 71, to form State Route 64. (SR 11 had continued to Bluefield, West Virginia along US 19.) In late 1940, most of SR 64 was renumbered as SR 70, running from Tennessee to St. Paul, to match Tennessee's SR 70. North of St. Paul, SR 64 replaced the former SR 70 (now SR 63), while SR 64 remained on its old alignment from St. Paul southeast to Dickensonville, and switched places with SR 71 to end at Hansonville. Additionally, while SR 64 had gone from Pennington Gap towards Big Stone Gap via Woodway, the new SR 70 replaced SR 66 via Dryden; the old SR 64 from Woodway towards Big Stone Gap became SR 65.

US 58 Alt. was formed in the early 1950s, and replaced all of SR 70 east of Jonesville, truncating it to its current length.

== State Route 798 ==
In 1954, SR 70 became a secondary route, SR 798, over objections. It was added back to the primary system in 1962, after being reconstructed, including the building of a new bridge over the Powell River.

"SR 798" is now used on a minor 0.3-mile (0.5 km) dead-end street off State Route 642.

== Major intersections ==
The entire route is in Lee County.

Location	mi	km	Destinations	Notes
	0.00	0.00	SR 70 south – Rogersville	Tennessee state line; southern terminus
Jonesville	11.88	19.12	US 58 (Wilderness Road)	Northern terminus
1.000 mi = 1.609 km; 1.000 km = 0.621 mi

< SR 109	Spurs of SR 10; 1923–1928	SR 1011 >
< SR 102	District 1 State Routes; 1928–1933	SR 104 >
