= Baileyton, Tennessee =

Baileyton
- Town
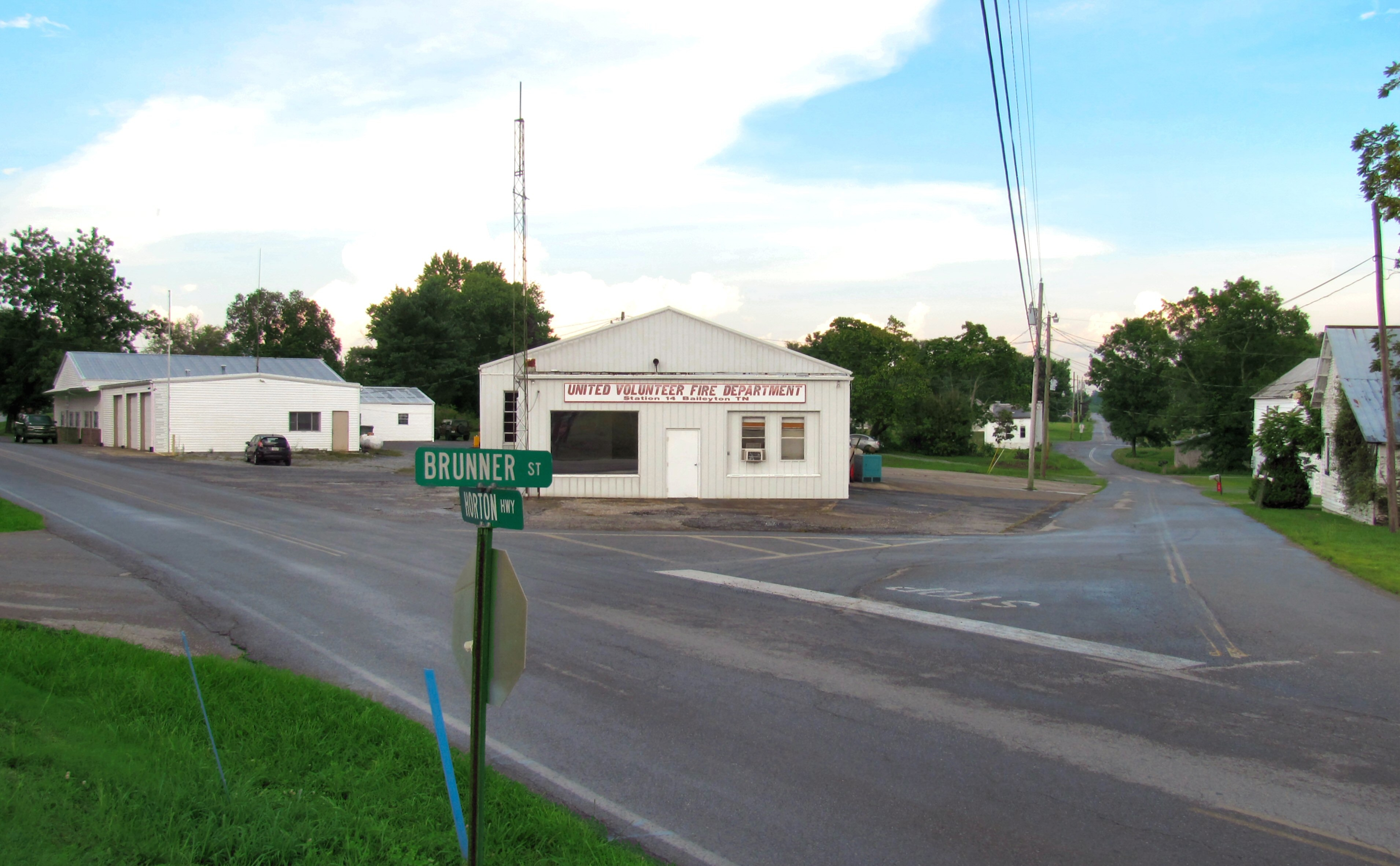
- Intersection of Brunner Street and Horton Highway

- Location of Baileyton in Greene County, Tennessee.
- Coordinates: 36°19′52″N 82°50′10″W
- Country: United States
- State: Tennessee
- County: Greene
- Incorporated: 1915

Government
  - Type: Mayor/Aldermen
  - Mayor: William K. Kerr
  - Vice Mayor: Andrew Pierce
  - Town Recorder: Jessica S. Brown
  - Police Chief: Joshua Ferguson
  - Aldermen: List of Aldermen: Stephen Clouser; Stephen Hall; Sherrie Ottinger

Area
  - Total: 1.62 sq mi (4.20 km^{2})
  - Land: 1.62 sq mi (4.20 km^{2})
  - Water: 0 sq mi (0.00 km^{2})
- Elevation: 1,207 ft (368 m)

Population (2020)
  - Total: 436
  - Density: 269/sq mi (103.8/km^{2})
- Time zone: UTC-5 (Eastern (EST))
  - Summer (DST): UTC-4 (EDT)
- ZIP code: 37745
- Area code: 423
- FIPS code: 47-02780
- GNIS feature ID: 2405199

Baileyton is a town in northern Greene County, Tennessee, United States. As of the 2020 census, Baileyton had a population of 436. Baileyton is located 13 miles (21 km) north of Greeneville and 18 miles (29 km) southeast of Rogersville.

== History ==
Originally called "Laurel Gap", the area was first settled in 1776. Many families lived in Laurel Gap, mostly farmers. Then a name change came about and it was called Bailey Town from 1892 until 1915. When the town became incorporated in 1915, the w was dropped and the name changed to "Baileyton", which stems from Claudius and Thomas P. Bailey, two brothers who lived there.

== Geography ==
Baileyton is located the base of a rugged area of northern Greene County, just south of the Hawkins County line. Bays Mountain, part of the greater Ridge-and-Valley Appalachians, rises prominently to the north. The town is drained primarily by Gardner Creek and Hughes Branch, both tributaries of Lick Creek (which is in turn a tributary of the Nolichucky River).

According to the United States Census Bureau, the town has a total area of 1.7 square miles (4.3 km^{2}), all of it land.

== Demographics ==
Historical population
Census	Pop.	Note	%±
1920	169		—
1930	212		25.4%
1940	229		8.0%
1950	224		−2.2%
1960	206		−8.0%
1970	258		25.2%
1980	333		29.1%
1990	309		−7.2%
2000	504		63.1%
2010	431		−14.5%
2020	436		1.2%

=== 2020 census ===
Baileyton racial composition
Race	Number	Percentage
White (non-Hispanic)	401	91.97%
Black or African American (non-Hispanic)	9	2.06%
Native American	3	0.69%
Asian	2	0.46%
Pacific Islander	1	0.23%
Other/Mixed	11	2.52%
Hispanic or Latino	9	2.06%

As of the 2020 United States census, there were 436 people, 193 households, and 105 families residing in the town.

=== 2000 census ===
As of the census of 2000, there were 504 people, 237 households, and 138 families residing in the town. The population density was 353.6 inhabitants per square mile (136.5/km^{2}). There were 275 housing units at an average density of 192.9 per square mile (74.5/km^{2}). The racial makeup of the town was 98.21% White, 0.99% African American, 0.20% Native American, 0.40% from other races, and 0.20% from two or more races. Hispanic or Latino of any race were 0.79% of the population.

There were 237 households, out of which 23.6% had children under the age of 18 living with them, 44.7% were married couples living together, 12.2% had a female householder with no husband present, and 41.4% were non-families. 36.3% of all households were made up of individuals, and 15.2% had someone living alone who was 65 years of age or older. The average household size was 2.13 and the average family size was 2.77.

In the town, the population was spread out, with 19.0% under the age of 18, 8.7% from 18 to 24, 25.4% from 25 to 44, 29.6% from 45 to 64, and 17.3% who were 65 years of age or older. The median age was 42 years. For every 100 females, there were 88.1 males. For every 100 females age 18 and over, there were 83.8 males.

The median income for a household in the town was $20,139, and the median income for a family was $34,375. Males had a median income of $26,389 versus $18,056 for females. The per capita income for the town was $12,410. About 13.1% of families and 20.4% of the population were below the poverty line, including 26.0% of those under age 18 and 25.9% of those age 65 or over.

== Postal service ==
Baileyton does not have a post office. The closest post office is in Greeneville. Baileyton along with Greeneville and Tusculum share the ZIP code 37745.

== Education ==
Schools in Baileyton are operated by the Greene County Schools, which covers Baileyton:

- Baileyton Elementary School – serves grades PK–4
- North Greene High School – serves grades 9–12.

North Greene Middle School, formerly Ottway Elementary located in nearby Ottway now serves students in grades 5 to 8.

== Economy ==
Most residents in Baileyton work in Greeneville or other nearby cities. There are several restaurants and gas stations off Interstate 81 exit 36. Several stores are also located in Baileyton.

== Transportation ==
Baileyton is located off Interstate 81 exit 36, north of Greeneville. I-81 leads northeast 42 miles (68 km) to Bristol and southwest 70 miles (110 km) to Knoxville (via Interstate 40). State Route 172 connects Greeneville to Interstate 81 in Baileyton.

Van Hill Road (a former alignment of State Route 172) connects to State Route 347 which leads west to Rogersville and northeast to Kingsport.

Horton Highway is the main west-east road through Baileyton. It connects Baileyton with Tennessee State Route 70 west of town near Romeo and Tennessee State Route 93 east of Baileyton, north of Fall Branch.
