= North Greene High School =

Location
- 4675 Old Baileyton Road; Greeneville, Tennessee 37745; United States; 36.3077°N 82.8030°W

Information
- Type: Public High School
- Established: 1963
- School district: Greene County Schools
- Guidance: Michelle Keffer
- Principal: Amanda Weems
- Assistant Principal: Susie Buchanan
- Staff: 29.06 (FTE)
- Grades: 9–12
- Enrollment: 296 (2023–2024)
- Student to teacher ratio: 10.19
- Campus: Rural
- Colors: Dark Green; Grey
- Team name: Huskies
- Website: Official website.

North Greene High School is a (9-12) public high school in Greene County located at 4675 Old Baileyton Road in Baileyton, Tennessee. It is operated by Greene County Schools. It is a consolidation of West Pines, Ottway, and Baileyton high schools.

Baileyton Elementary and North Greene Middle (formerly Ottway Elementary) schools feed into North Greene High School.

As of April 2026, the principal school is Susie Buchanan.

== Athletics ==
North Greene High School plays in TSSAA's east grand division and 1st athletic district as the Huskies for baseball, basketball, cheerleading, cross country, football, golf, soccer, softball, tennis, track and field, volleyball, wrestling.
