= Jearoldstown, Tennessee =

Unincorporated community in Tennessee, US

Coordinates: 36°21′47″N 82°42′09″W

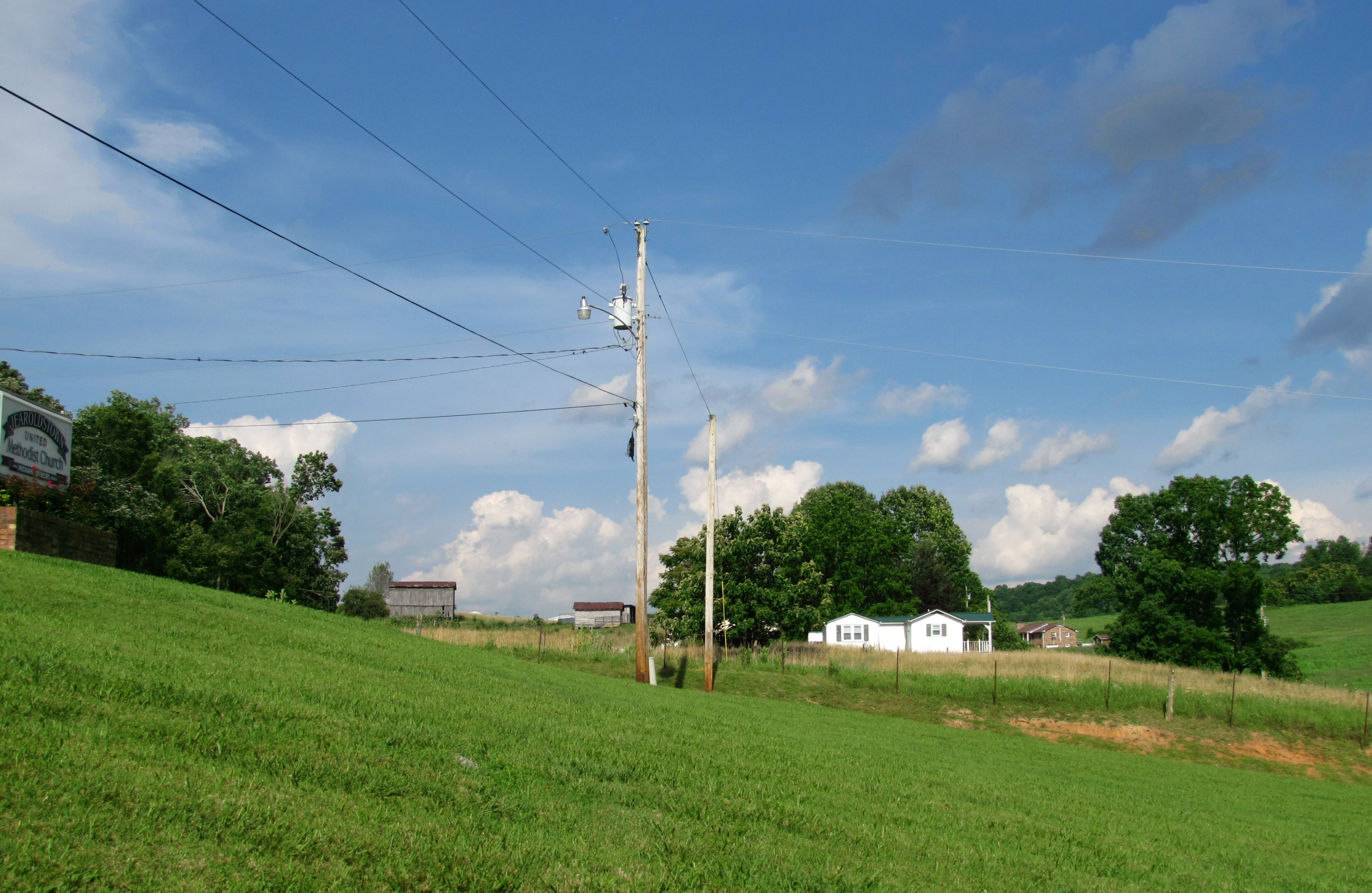
Jearoldstown, viewed from the Jearoldstown United Methodist Church

Jearoldstown is an unincorporated community in northeastern Greene County, Tennessee. Jearoldstown is located off Interstate 81 exit 44, between Fall Branch and Baileyton.
