= Tennessee State Route 126 =

Highway in Tennessee, United States

State Route 126
- SR 126 highlighted in red

Route information
- Maintained by TDOT
- Length: 24.6 mi (39.6 km)

Major junctions
- West end: I-26 / US 23 / SR 93 in Kingsport
- SR 93 in Kingsport; I-81 in Kingsport; SR 394 in Blountville
- East end: US 11W in Bristol

Location
- Country: United States
- State: Tennessee
- Counties: Sullivan

Highway system
- Tennessee State Routes; Interstate; US; State
← SR 125	→ US 127

State Route 126 (SR 126) is a 24.6-mile-long (39.6 km) state highway that travels through Sullivan County in East Tennessee. It connects Kingsport and Bristol.

== Route description ==
SR 126 begins in Kingsport at an intersection with SR 93 at its interchange with I-26/US 23 (Exit 4). It goes northeast as a 4-lane undivided highway (known as Wilcox Drive) and immediately has an intersection with its business route, SR 126 Bus (old Wilcox Drive), before going through neighborhoods and industrialized areas before having an interchange with Jared Drive and crossing a bridge over the South Fork Holston River and having an intersection with SR 355. SR 126 continues northeast through more neighborhoods before coming to an intersection with and becoming concurrent with SR 36 (E Center Street), where SR 126 turns southeast to become concurrent with that highway. SR 36/SR 126 then continue southeast to a y-intersection, where they turn onto Fort Henry Drive and become a divided highway. They then come to an intersection with Memorial Boulevard, where SR 126 turns east to leave SR 36 to follow that street. SR 126 becomes undivided once again as it passes through some commercial areas before coming to an interchange with SR 93, where it narrows to 2-lanes and leaves Kingsport, through it still officially remains within the city limits. SR 126 then passes through a mix of woodland, farmland, and some homes and crosses over a ridge before coming to an interchange with I-81 (Exit 66), where it officially exits the city limits of Kingsport. The highway then passes through some hills, farmland and woodland, now paralleling I-81, to enter Blountville, where it has an intersection with SR 75. SR 126 then enters downtown and has an intersection with SR 394. The highway then continues east through downtown before leaving Blountville and continuing east. SR 126 then passes through more woodland and farmland along with more homes and Walnut Hill before entering Bristol, coming to an end at an intersection with US 11W/SR 1 just west of downtown.

== History ==
SR 126 was the original US 11W from Bristol to Kingsport until the late 1950s when the US highway was relocated four miles (6.4 km) north of Blountville and paralleled Reedy Creek Road/Bloomington Pike Road, which bypassed Blountville and Sullivan Gardens. SR 126 being the older road also accessed a county road leading to Warrior's Path State Park.

== Future ==
The part known as Memorial Boulevard from Kingsport to Blountville is undergoing a widening project that will add more lanes and make the road safer for traffic. The project has not yet been started.

== Junction list ==
The entire route is in Sullivan County.

Location	mi	km	Destinations	Notes
Kingsport	0.0	0.0	SR 93 (South John B. Dennis Hwy) – Greeneville, Weber City, Johnson City	Western terminus
Kingsport			SR 126 Bus. south (Old Wilcox Drive)	Northern terminus of SR 126 Business
Kingsport			SR 355 north (Industry Drive)	Southern terminus of SR 355
Kingsport			SR 36 north (East Center Street) – Gate City	Western end of SR 36 overlap
Kingsport			SR 36 south (Fort Henry Drive) – Colonial Heights	Eastern end of SR 36 overlap
Kingsport			SR 93 (North John B. Dennis Hwy) – Greeneville, Weber City	Interchange
Kingsport			I-81 – Knoxville, Bristol	I-81 exit 66.
Blountville			SR 75 south – Northeast State Community College, Tri-Cities Regional Airport	Northern terminus of SR 75
Blountville			SR 394 / SR 126 Truck east – Bristol Motor Speedway	Western terminus of Truck Route.
Blountville			SR 126 Truck west (Blountville Bypass)	Eastern terminus of Truck Route.
Bristol	24.6	39.6	US 11W (SR 1 / West State Street) – Bristol, Kingsport, King University	Eastern terminus
1.000 mi = 1.609 km; 1.000 km = 0.621 mi: Concurrency terminus

== Auxiliary routes ==
=== Kingsport business route ===
A business route of SR 126 exists in Kingsport. It begins at Interstate 26/U.S. Route 23/State Route 93 and ends at SR 126 near downtown Kingsport.

=== Blountville truck route ===
A truck route exists to divert trucks around downtown Blountville. It begins at SR 126 and SR 394 and follows 394 to Blountville Bypass and turns onto Blountville Bypass and ends at 126 east of downtown Blountville.
