= Tennessee State Route 93 =

State highway in Tennessee, United States

State Route 93
- SR 93 highlighted in red

Route information
- Maintained by TDOT
- Length: 38.6 mi (62.1 km)

Major junctions
- South end: US 11E / US 321 in Greeneville
- SR 351 south at Newmansville; SR 81 near Fall Branch; I-81 at Fall Branch; I-26 / US 23 / SR 126 Bus. at Kingsport; US 11W at Kingsport
- North end: SR 224 at Bloomingdale

Location
- Country: United States
- State: Tennessee
- Counties: Greene, Washington, Sullivan

Highway system
- Tennessee State Routes; Interstate; US; State
← SR 92	→ SR 94

State Route 93 (SR 93) is a 38.6-mile-long (62.1 km) state highway in the eastern part of the U.S. state of Tennessee. It begins at US 11E/US 321 in Greeneville and ending at the Tennessee–Virginia state line in Bloomingdale, Tennessee.

== Route description ==
SR 93 begins at an intersection with US 11E/US 321 in Greeneville. It then heads northeast toward Kingsport. The route intersects SR 81 just south of Fall Branch and heads more northerly. In Fall Branch, it has an interchange with I-81 exit 50 and continues north to Kingsport where it intersects SR 347 just south of there. In Kingsport, it has an interchange with I-26, US 23, and SR 126 for the first time. This also marks the western terminus of SR 126. The route heads east as a controlled-access southern bypass of the city passing by Eastman Chemical Company and crossing over the South Fork Holston River and has an interchange with SR 36. Then, it intersects SR 126 for a second time at an interchange. SR 93 then turns back north to an interchange with US 11W and then it meets its northern terminus, at the Tennessee–Virginia State Line in Bloomingdale.

All of SR 93, from just north of I-81 to US 11W, is included as part of the National Highway System, a system of roadways important to the nation's economy, defense, and mobility.

== Junction list ==
County	Location	mi	km	Destinations	Notes
Greene	Greeneville	0.0	0.0	US 11E / US 321 (East Andrew Johnson Highway/West Andrew Johnson Highway/North Main Street/SR 34/SR 35) – Tusculum, Bulls Gap	Southern terminus
Greene	Newmansville	8.0	12.9	SR 351 south (Rheatown Road) – Rheatown	Northern terminus of SR 351
Washington		19.3	31.1	SR 81 south – Jonesborough, Erwin	Northern terminus of SR 81
Washington	Fall Branch	20.6	33.2	I-81 – Knoxville, Bristol	I-81 exit 50
Sullivan				Baileyton Road To Horton Highway – Baileyton	
Sullivan	Sullivan Gardens	26.5	42.6	SR 347 (Lone Star Road/Mill Creek Road) – Rogersville, Colonial Heights	
Sullivan	Kingsport	29.3	47.2	I-26 / US 23 / SR 126 Bus. north (Wilcox Drive) – Johnson City, Weber City, Gate City	I-26/US 23 exit 4
Sullivan	Kingsport	29.7	47.8	SR 126 east (Wilcox Drive) – Downtown Kingsport	Western terminus of SR 126
Sullivan	Kingsport	30.4	48.9	Moreland Drive – Colonial Heights	Interchange
Sullivan	Kingsport	32.3	52.0	SR 36 (Fort Henry Drive) – Colonial Heights, Johnson City, Downtown Kingsport	Interchange
Sullivan	Kingsport	33.5	53.9	SR 126 (Memorial Boulevard) – Blountville, Downtown Kingsport	Interchange
Sullivan	Kingsport	33.9	54.6	Orebank Road – Exchange Place, Orebank	Interchange; northbound exit only
Sullivan	Kingsport	34.5	55.5	US 11W (East Stone Drive/SR 1) – Church Hill, Rogersville, Bristol	Interchange
Sullivan	Bloomingdale	38.6	62.1	SR 224 (Wadlow Gap Road) – Weber City, Gate City	Northern terminus; SR 93 continues north into Virginia as SR 224
1.000 mi = 1.609 km; 1.000 km = 0.621 mi: Incomplete access
