= Tennessee State Route 172 =

State highway in Greene County, Tennessee

State Route 172
- Baileyton Road
- SR 172 highlighted in red

Route information
- Maintained by TDOT
- Length: 12.2 mi (19.6 km)

Major junctions
- South end: US 321 in Greeneville
- US 11E / US 321 Truck in Greeneville
- North end: I-81 in Baileyton

Location
- Country: United States
- State: Tennessee
- Counties: Greene

Highway system
- Tennessee State Routes; Interstate; US; State
← SR 171	→ SR 173

State Route 172 (SR 172) is a state highway in Greene County, Tennessee. It begins at a partially unsigned intersection with US 321 near downtown Greeneville and it is signed starting at its intersection with US 11E/US 321 Truck and ends at Interstate 81 in Baileyton.

== Route description ==
SR 172 begins in Greeneville just north of downtown at an intersection with US 321/SR 35 (N Main Street). It goes north east as Baileyton Road to have an interchange with US 11E/SR 34 (W Andrew Johnson Highway) before continuing past some businesses and homes. SR 172 then leaves Greeneville and continues north through rural countryside. The highway has an intersection with Ottway Road, which is a major county road that leads to Ottway. SR 172 continues north through rural areas before entering Baileyton, where it comes to an end at an interchange with I-81 (Exit 36) just south of downtown, where the road continues as Van Hill Road (Former SR 172).

== History ==
SR 172 formerly traveled five miles (8.0 km) more than it does now and ended in Hawkins County at SR 347.

== Junction list ==
County	Location	mi	km	Destinations	Notes
Greene	Greeneville	0.00	0.00	US 321 (North Main Street/SR 35) – Greeneville, Newport	Partially unsigned southern terminus
Greene	Greeneville	0.03	0.048	US 11E / US 321 Truck (West Andrew Johnson Highway/SR 34) – Mosheim, Tusculum	Interchange; SR 172 becomes fully signed
Greene		7.1	11.4	Ottway Road – Ottway	
Greene	Baileyton	12.2	19.6	I-81 – Knoxville, Tri-Cities	I-81 exit 36; current northern terminus; road continues north as Van Hill Road
Greene	Baileyton			Horton Highway - Fall Branch	Intersection on former alignment (Van Hill Road); major county road
Hawkins	Van Hill			SR 347 (Beech Creek Road) – Rogersville, Kingsport	Former Northern terminus
1.000 mi = 1.609 km; 1.000 km = 0.621 mi: Closed/former
