= Virginia State Route 224 =

State highway in Scott County, Virginia, US

State Route 224
- Wadlow Gap Road

Route information
- Maintained by VDOT
- Length: 3.32 mi (5.34 km)
- Existed: 1991–present

Major junctions
- South end: SR 93 near Weber City
- North end: US 58 / US 421 in Weber City

Location
- Country: United States
- State: Virginia
- Counties: Scott

Highway system
- Virginia Routes; Interstate; US; Primary; Secondary; Byways; History; HOT lanes
← SR 223	→ SR 225

State Route 224 (SR 224) is a primary state highway in the U.S. state of Virginia. Known as Wadlow Gap Road, the state highway runs 3.32 miles (5.34 km) from the Tennessee state line, where the highway continues as Tennessee State Route 93 (SR 93), north to U.S. Route 58 (US 58) and US 421 in Weber City.

== Route description ==
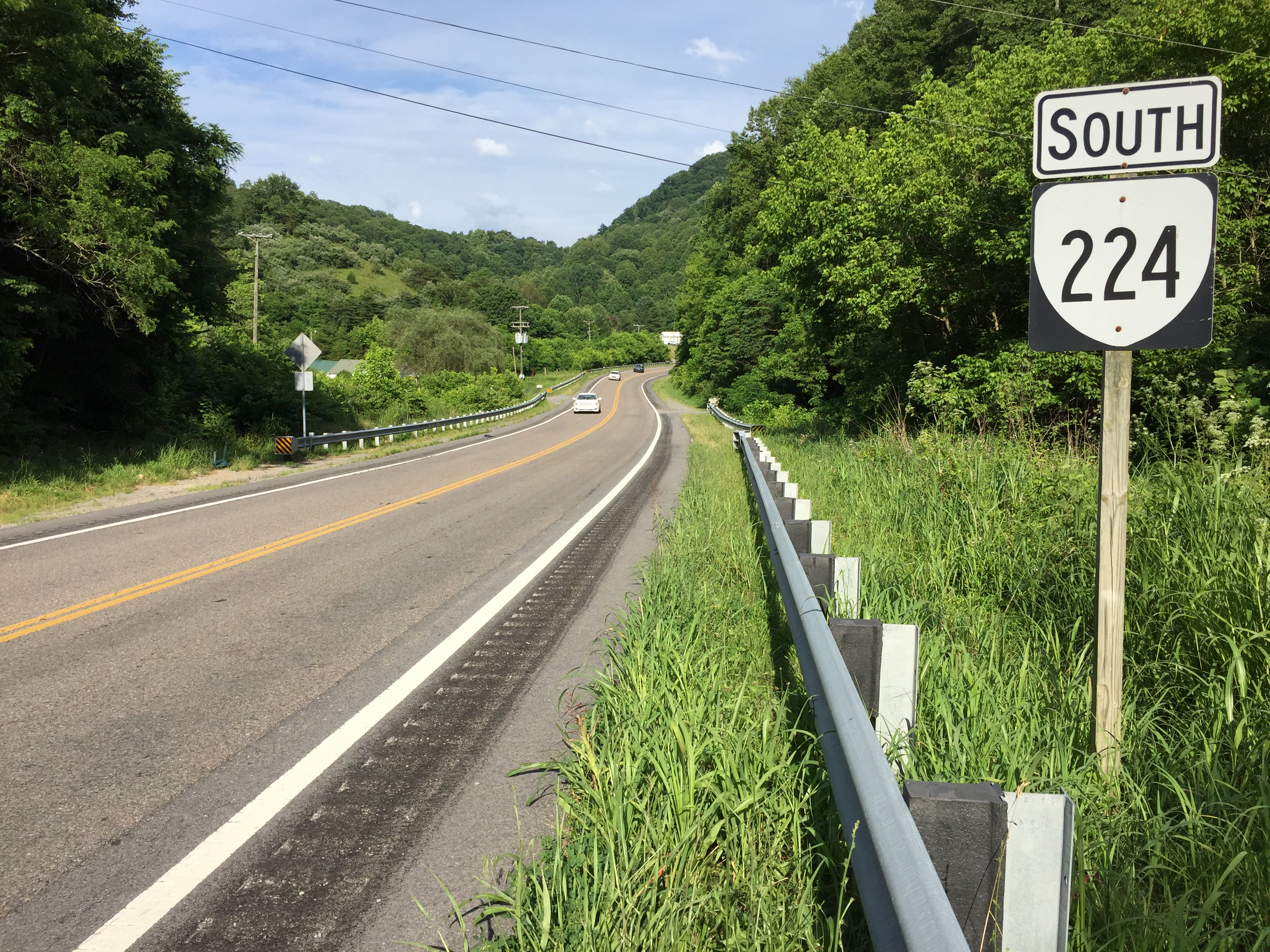
View south along SR 224 south of Weber City

SR 224 begins at the Tennessee state line at Wadlow Gap, a wind gap in a low range of hills between Carter Valley to the north and the larger valley to the south that contains Kingsport. Wadlow Gap Road continues south toward that city as SR 93. SR 224 heads north and crosses the Carter Valley, then crosses Long Ridge before crossing the North Fork Holston River. The state highway veers west and curves back east around Pine Ridge before reaching its northern terminus at US 58 and US 421 (Hilton Road) a short distance to the east of Moccasin Gap on the eastern edge of the town of Weber City, where US 58 and US 421 intersect US 23.

== Major intersections ==
The entire route is in Scott County.

Location	mi	km	Destinations	Notes
Wadlow Gap	0.00	0.00	SR 93 south (Wadlow Gap Road) – Kingsport	Tennessee state line; southern terminus
	3.32	5.34	US 58 east / US 421 south (Bristol Highway) – Hiltons, Carter Fold	south end of US 58 / US 421 overlap
Weber City			US 23 / US 58 west / US 421 north – Kingsport, Gate City, Cumberland Gap	Northern terminus; north end of US 58 / US 421 overlap
1.000 mi = 1.609 km; 1.000 km = 0.621 mi: Concurrency terminus
