= Sullivan Gardens, Tennessee =

CDP in Tennessee, US

Coordinates: 36°28′40″N 82°35′36″W

Sullivan Gardens is a census-designated place in southwestern Sullivan County, Tennessee, located southwest of Kingsport.

== Education ==
Sullivan Elementary School and Sullivan Middle School are located in the "downtown" area.

== Transportation ==
Tennessee State Route 93 (Sullivan Gardens Parkway) used to run north and south through the community. Now most visitors continue on the Sullivan Gardens Parkway as a bypass as there is no major business located on Sullivan Gardens Drive. Tennessee State Route 347 (Lone Star Road) runs east and west.
