= Romeo, Tennessee =

Romeo
- Unincorporated community
- Location within Tennessee Location within the United States
- Coordinates: 36°17′28″N 82°56′09″W
- Country: United States
- State: Tennessee
- County: Greene
- Elevation: 1,234 ft (376 m)
- Time zone: UTC-5 (Eastern (EST))
  - Summer (DST): UTC-4 (EDT)
- Area code: 423
- GNIS feature ID: 1315839

Romeo is an unincorporated community in Greene County, Tennessee. Romeo is located in Northern Greene County along Tennessee State Route 70, just north of Interstate 81 exit 30.
