= Interstate 81 in Tennessee =

Section of Interstate Highway in Tennessee, United States

Interstate 81
- I-81 highlighted in red

Route information
- Maintained by TDOT
- Length: 75.66 mi (121.76 km)
- Existed: August 14, 1957–present
- History: Completed August 27, 1975
- NHS: Entire route

Major junctions
- South end: I-40 near Dandridge
- US 25E near Morristown; US 11E near Greeneville; I-26 / US 23 in Kingsport; US 11W in Bristol
- North end: I-81 at the Virginia state line in Bristol, VA

Location
- Country: United States
- State: Tennessee
- Counties: Jefferson, Hamblen, Greene, Washington, Sullivan

Highway system
- Interstate Highway System; Main; Auxiliary; Suffixed; Business; Future; Tennessee State Routes; Interstate; US; State
← SR 80	→ SR 81

Interstate 81 (I-81) is part of the Interstate Highway System that runs 855.02 miles (1,376.02 km) northward from Dandridge, Tennessee, to the Thousand Islands Bridge at the Canadian border near Fishers Landing, New York. In Tennessee, I-81 serves the northeastern part of the state, running 75.66 miles (121.76 km) from its southern terminus with I-40 in Dandridge to the Virginia state line in Bristol. The route serves the Tri-Cities region of the state and the eastern parts of the Knoxville metropolitan area, terminating about 35 miles (56 km) east of Knoxville. I-81 bypasses most cities that it serves, instead providing access via interchanges with state and federal routes. It remains in the Ridge-and-Valley topographic region of the Appalachian Mountains for its entire length in Tennessee, and runs in a northeast to southwest direction.

I-81 roughly follows the corridors of U.S. Routes 11E and 11W in Tennessee, but unlike many stretches of Interstate Highways, does not closely parallel any U.S. Numbered Highway until it reaches Bristol. The first parts of I-81 in the state were constructed in the early 1960s, with additional progress made on the Interstate throughout that decade. However, most of the route was constructed later than the other Interstate Highways initially allocated to Tennessee, and did not open until after 1970. The last stretch of I-81 in Tennessee, which was more than half of the entire route in the state, was completed in 1975. From 1985 to 2007, the Interstate had one auxiliary route, I-181, which was renumbered as part of I-26.

== Route description ==
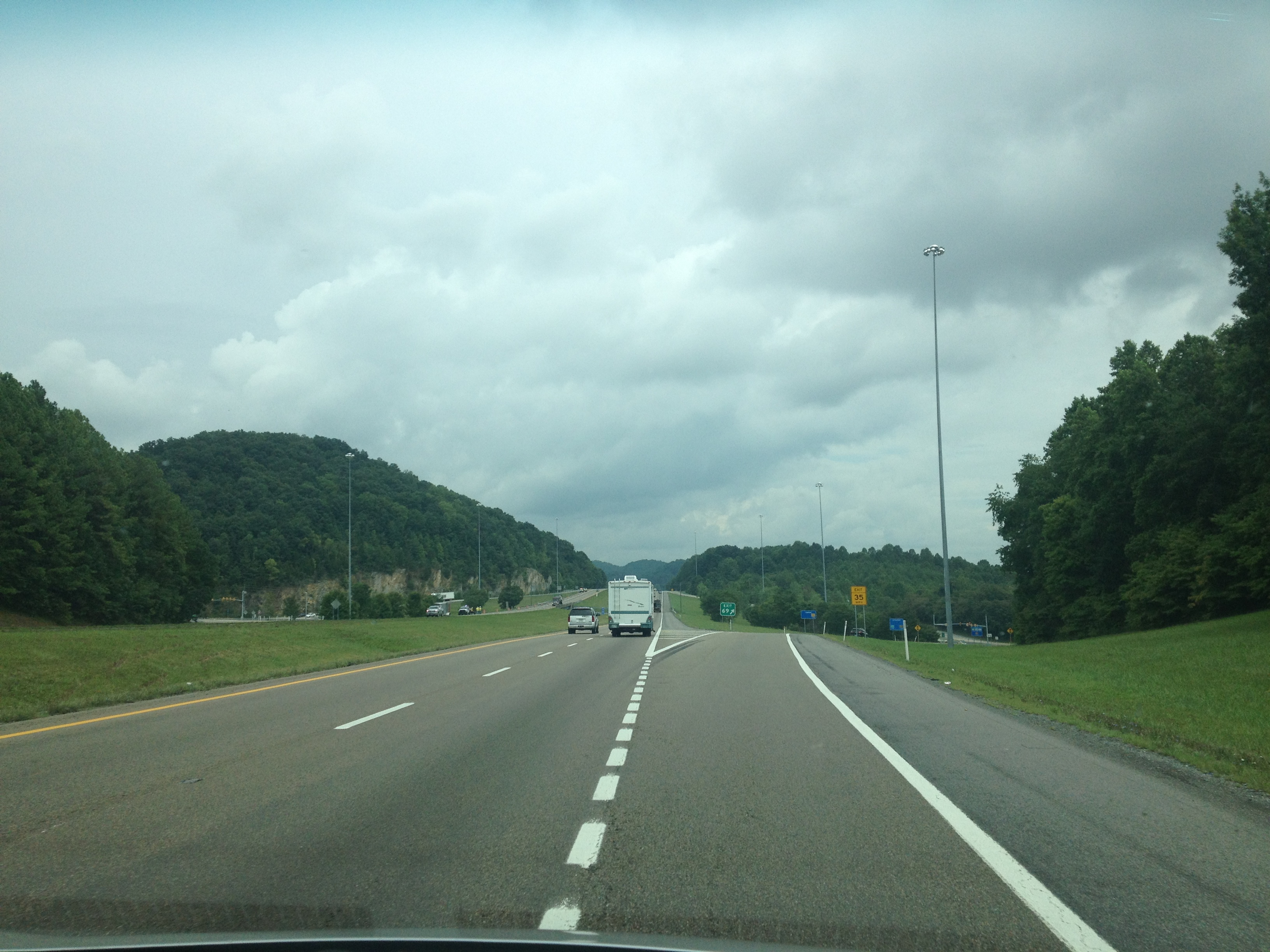
I-81 northbound at the SR 394 exit in Blountville

I-81 is maintained by the Tennessee Department of Transportation (TDOT), along with all other Interstate, US, and state highways in Tennessee. In 2025, annual average daily traffic (AADT) volumes ranged from 56,424 vehicles per day at the southern terminus to 35,173 vehicles per day between US Route 11E (US 11E) and State Route 70 (SR 70).

I-81 begins at a directional T interchange with I-40 near Dandridge in unincorporated Jefferson County about 35 miles (56 km) east of downtown Knoxville. Traveling in a northeast-to-southwest alignment in a valley through mostly farmland and some woodlands, the Interstate has its first interchange with SR 341 a short distance later near White Pine. This route connects to SR 66, providing access to Morristown to the north. Soon thereafter, the highway crosses into Hamblen County and meets US 25E south of Morristown, which is a major north–south arterial route in the region and part of the East Tennessee Crossing Byway. Continuing through mostly rural terrain, I-81 has an interchange with SR 160, the final Morristown exit, a few miles beyond. After some distance, the Interstate crosses over a ridge and into Greene County.

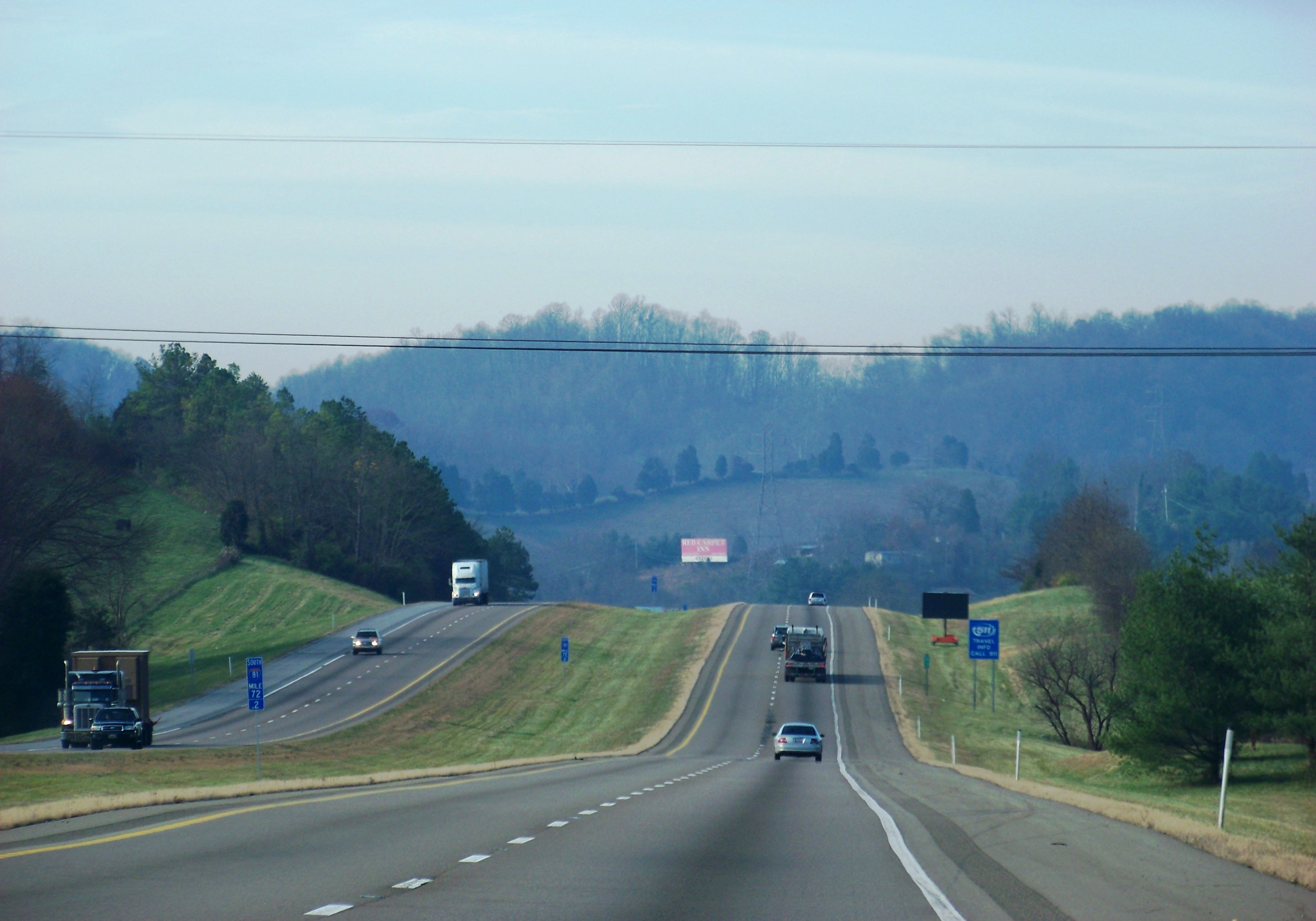
I-81 near Bristol looking south

About five miles (8.0 km) past the Greene County line is an interchange with US 11E near Mosheim, which provides access to Greeneville to the southeast and Bulls Gap to the northwest. Continuing through a predominantly rural and agricultural area, I-81 reaches SR 70, which connects to Greeneville to the south and Rogersville to the north. The Interstate proceeds through additional farmland for several more miles and passes the town of Baileyton, before beginning a slight uphill climb, with the northbound lanes utilizing a truck climbing lane for about 1.5 miles (2.4 km) near the community of Jearoldstown. Here, the route also shifts slightly to the northeast. A few miles later, I-81 veers sharply east and crosses into semi-urban Washington County. Immediately beyond this point is an interchange with SR 93, which provides access to Jonesborough to the south and Fall Branch to the north. I-81 then turns northeast again, and crosses into Sullivan County after a short distance.

Entering a semi-urbanized part of the Tri-Cities area, I-81 reaches I-26 and US 23 at a cloverleaf interchange a few miles later. This route provides access to Kingsport to the north and Johnson City to the south, two of the principal municipalities of the Tri-Cities. Shortly thereafter is an interchange with SR 36, another major connector between these two cities. The freeway then crosses the Fort Patrick Henry Lake impoundment of the Holston River next to Warriors' Path State Park and begins another slight uphill climb, once again gaining a northbound truck climbing lane. About three miles (4.8 km) beyond this, the truck lane terminates at an interchange with SR 357, a connector to Tri-Cities Regional Airport. The route then proceeds through a mix of farmland, woodlands, and residential neighborhoods, briefly shifting eastward and crossing a ridge after a few miles. Shifting northeastwardly again, the Interstate has an interchange with SR 394 near the unincorporated town of Blountville. Beyond this exit, the route ascends over a slight upgrade, before reaching a relatively flat stretch again. A few miles beyond here, I-81 reaches Bristol, the final of the Tri-Cities, and widens to six lanes. It then has a cloverleaf interchange with US 11W before crossing into Virginia and its twin city of Bristol one mile (1.6 km) later.

== History ==
=== Predecessor highways ===
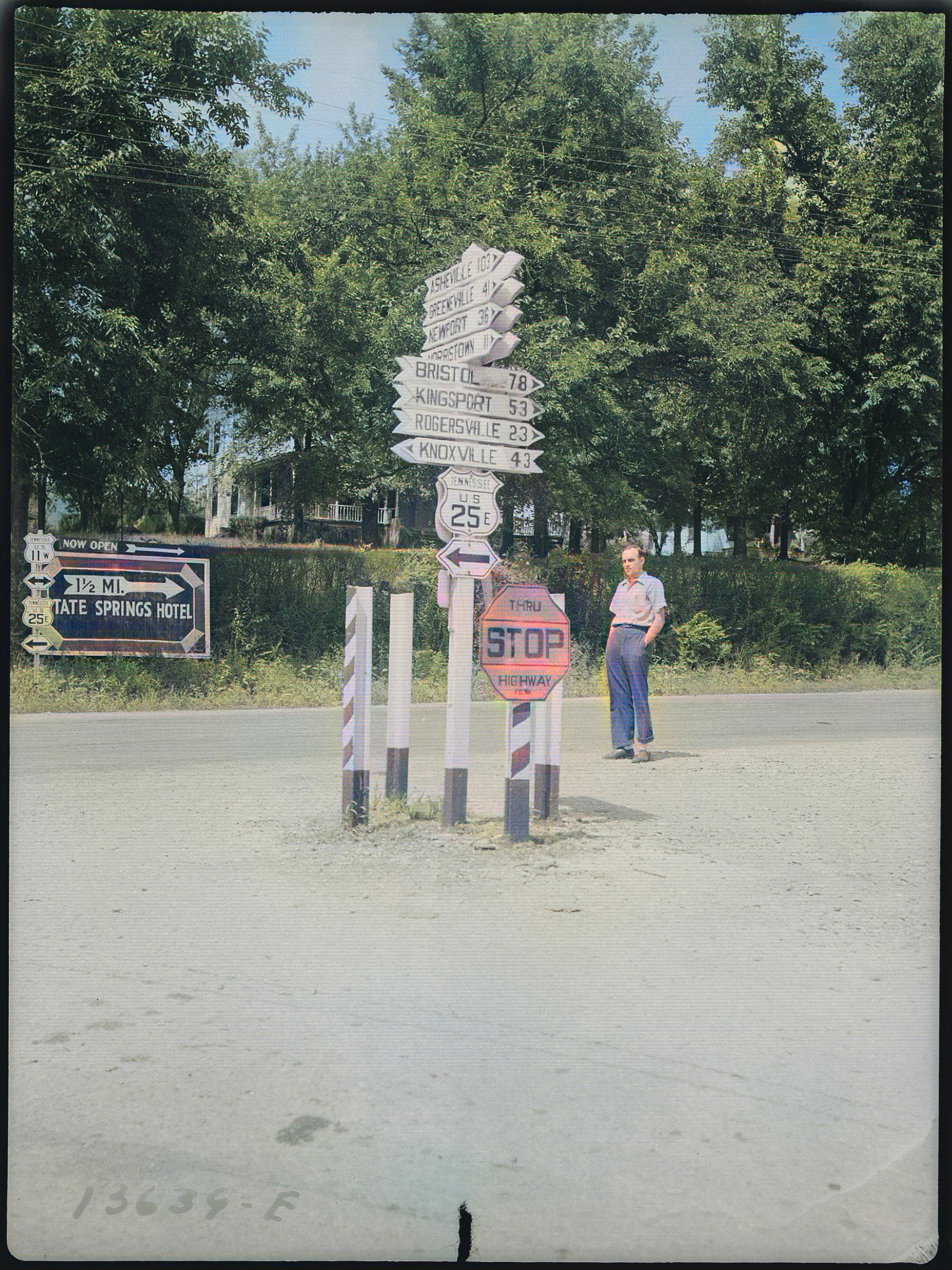
The crossroads between US 11W and US 25E in old Bean Station in 1942 with signs showing distances to cities along each route.

Prior to the settlement of Tennessee by European Americans, a series of Native American trails existed in the area that I-81 now passes through. Most of these were part of the Great Indian Warpath, which the Interstate follows for most of its length. A lesser used trail reportedly existed east of this path, which became part of the Great Wagon Road, also known as the Great Valley Road. The northeastern part of Tennessee was the first part of the state to be significantly explored and settled, with long hunters exploring much of the region during the 1760s and the first permanent settlements arising by the end of that decade. The Great Indian Warpath from Knoxville to Abingdon, Virginia, became a wagon road known as the Old Stage Road, and was used extensively by early Tennesseans and travelers from other states.

In 1911, a series of Tennessee businesspeople formed the Memphis to Bristol Highway Association to encourage the state to improve the network of roads that ran between Memphis and Bristol. After the formation of the Tennessee Department of Highways and Public Works, the predecessor agency to TDOT, in 1915, the Old Stage Road was designated as part of the Memphis to Bristol Highway. This section became part of the Lee Highway, an auto trail, in 1919. When the Tennessee State Route System was established in 1923, this part of the Lee Highway became part of State Route 1 (SR 1), and the network of roads to the east that followed part of the Great Wagon Road became SR 34. When the United States Numbered Highway System was formed by Congress in 1926, Lee Highway became US 11, and SR 34 was designated as US 511. Tennessee officials objected to this numbering scheme, and in 1929 successfully petitioned the American Association of State Highway Officials (AASHO) to redesignate US 11 as US 11W and US 511 as US 11E in an event that came to be known as "The Tennessee Split".

=== Planning and construction ===
The highway that is now I-81 had its origins in the late 1930s, when the federal government began planning for a national "superhighway" system. A 1939 report titled Toll Roads and Free Roads and published by the Bureau of Public Roads (BPR), the predecessor agency to the Federal Highway Administration (FHWA), recommended a controlled-access highway connect Knoxville to Washington, D.C., and enter Virginia near Bristol. The general location of the highway that became I-81 was included in the National Interregional Highway Committee's 1944 report, titled Interregional Highways, and a subsequent 1947 plan produced by the Public Roads Administration of the now-defunct Federal Works Agency. These blueprints recommended that it terminate east of Knoxville with the highway that became I-40. During the planning phase, it was also suggested that the Interstate follow the corridor of US 11W from Knoxville to Bristol, but residents of Grainger County were opposed to this. The alignment was reaffirmed in a map produced by the BPR in September 1955. I-81 was part of the original 1,047.6 miles (1,685.9 km) of Interstate Highways authorized for Tennessee by the Federal-Aid Highway Act of 1956, commonly known as the Interstate Highway Act. The numbering was approved by the AASHO on August 14, 1957. That year, the Johnson City Planning Commission unsuccessfully lobbied to move the routing a few miles south between Morristown and Bristol to run closer to Johnson City and the Tri-Cities Regional Airport.

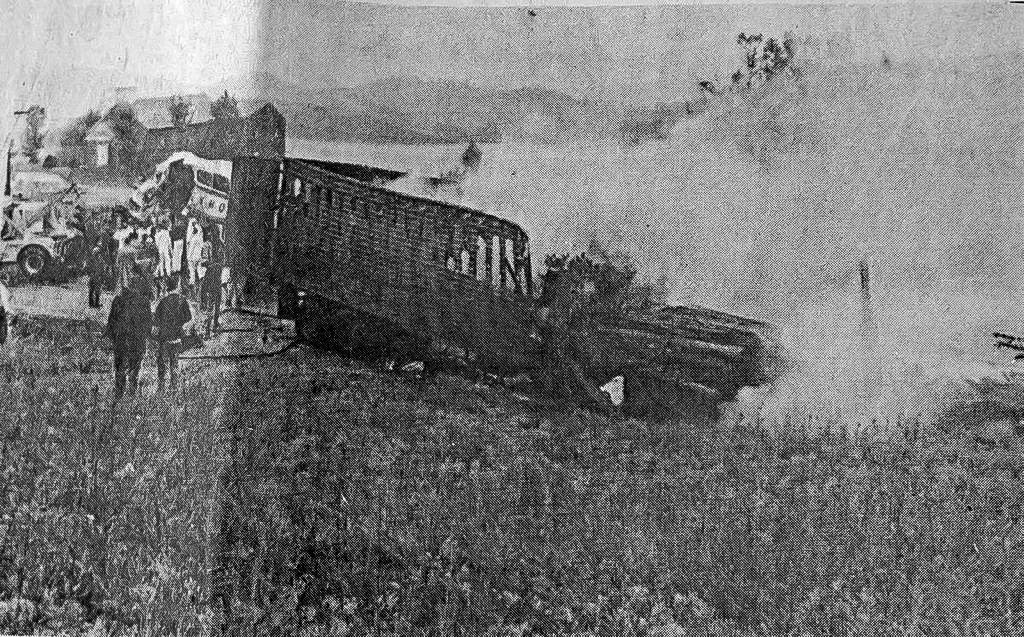
I-81 in Tennessee roughly parallels US 11W, which had earned the nickname "Bloody 11W" and was the site of the deadliest collision in Tennessee history in 1972.

Construction on I-81 in Tennessee began with short segments at each end. The first stretch of I-81 in Tennessee to be completed was the one-mile (1.6 km) segment between US 11W and the Virginia state line. Referred to at the time as the "Bristol Bypass", the contract was awarded on September 19, 1958. This section opened to traffic on November 20, 1961, along with the southernmost 5.6 miles (9.0 km) of the Interstate in Virginia and I-381 directly across the state line. A contract for grading and bridge construction on the interchange with I-40 was awarded on November 14, 1958, along with a 3.5-mile (5.6 km) connecting section of I-40 to the east. This was completed in the early 1960s, but this interchange was not opened to traffic until work on the approaches was complete. The contract to construct the segment between the southern terminus with I-40 and US 25E near Morristown was awarded in June 1964, and completed in December 1966, along with the connecting section of I-40. Like much of the Interstate System in Tennessee, priority was generally given to completing sections in Middle and West Tennessee over East Tennessee. For this reason, most of I-81 was not constructed in the state until after the late 1960s. The decision to prioritize other Interstate Highways was criticized by some due to the unsafe conditions and high accident rate on US 11W, which had earned the nickname "Bloody 11W" and was the site of the deadliest traffic collision in state history in 1972. The slow progress on the Interstate became an issue in the 1966 gubernatorial election, when Democratic candidate John Jay Hooker accused primary opponent Buford Ellington, who served as Governor from 1959 to 1963, of neglecting the stretch allocated for Tennessee. Ellington, who was elected that fall, responded with a promise to complete I-81 by 1971, the year the next governor would leave office, as well as improve US 11W.

Contracts for construction of the stretch between US 25E near Morristown and US 11E near Mosheim were let in August 1967 and February 1968, and the section opened to traffic on December 10, 1970. Contracts for sections in Sullivan County were awarded throughout 1969, and work on what became the final stretch of I-81 in Tennessee to be completed, the 43-mile (69 km) section located between US 11E and SR 126 near Blountville, began on July 7, 1969, in the southern part of that county. The remaining Sullivan County portions were contracted for construction in December 1970 and March 1971, and sections in Washington and Greene Counties were let in November and December 1971. The last construction contract for I-81 in Tennessee, which was for the northernmost 5.8 miles (9.3 km) in Greene County, was awarded in March 1972. The opening of the 9.6-mile (15.4 km) stretch between SR 126 and US 11W in Bristol was announced on December 23, 1972. Once all remaining construction began, completion of I-81 in Tennessee was expected by late 1973, but was delayed by the energy crisis that year. On December 20, 1974, the entire final stretch between US 11E and SR 126 was dedicated by then-Governor Winfield Dunn, and partially opened, with some portions restricted to two lanes. This stretch cost $61.5 million (equivalent to $312 million in 2025), and was dedicated on the same day that the last sections of I-40 and I-75 in Tennessee were opened. I-81 was officially completed in Tennessee on August 27, 1975, when all four lanes of the final section were fully opened to traffic.

=== Later history ===
On April 6, 1997, a carjacking that culminated in the Lillelid murders occurred at the I-81 southbound rest area near Baileyton. A group of six youths from Pikeville, Kentucky, forced the four members of the Lillelid family into their van and to drive approximately 3.5 miles (5.6 km) on the Interstate to the SR 172 interchange, which was the next exit. The family was then taken to a secluded road nearby where they were shot. Three of the victims died, and the lone survivor was left permanently disabled. The perpetrators were apprehended two days later in Douglas, Arizona, trying to flee into Mexico, and later sentenced to life in prison.

Work to widen the northernmost 1.3 miles (2.1 km) of I-81 in Tennessee to six lanes, along with the southernmost 7.5 miles (12.1 km) in Virginia, began in April 1998. Initially planned for completion in late 2000, the project experienced multiple delays and cost overruns, and was not completed until March 2003. A 2008 study conducted by TDOT on the I-40 and I-81 corridors identified a number of steep grades on both Interstates difficult for trucks to ascend, causing congestion and safety hazards. This study resulted in the construction of a truck climbing lane on I-81 northbound between the Holston River and SR 357 that was completed in 2019.

Between September 2011 and June 2014, the interchange with US 25E was modified in a project that replaced the southbound loop onramp with a traditional diamond ramp, widened the radius of the northbound loop exit ramp, replaced the US 25E overpass with a wider bridge, and added turn lanes at the intersections with the ramps. This project was necessitated by the hazardous conditions of the previous configuration and the adoption of US 25E as part of an alternate route to I-75.

== Exit list ==
County	Location	mi	km	Exit	Destinations	Notes
Jefferson		0.00	0.00	1	I-40 – Asheville, Knoxville, Nashville	Southern terminus; signed as exits 1A (east) and 1B (west); exit 421 on I-40
Jefferson	White Pine	4.13	6.65	4	SR 341 to SR 66 – White Pine, Morristown	
Hamblen	White Pine–Morristown line	7.93	12.76	8	US 25E – Morristown, Newport, White Pine	
Hamblen	Lowland	11.98	19.28	12	SR 160 – Lowland, Morristown	
Hamblen		15.09	24.29	15	SR 340 (Fish Hatchery Road)	
Greene	Mosheim	22.91	36.87	23	US 11E – Mosheim, Greeneville, Bulls Gap	Access to Tusculum University
Greene		30.33	48.81	30	SR 70 to SR 66 – Greeneville, Rogersville	
Greene	Baileyton	36.44	58.64	36	SR 172 (Baileyton Road) – Baileyton, Greeneville	
Greene	Jearoldstown	44.37	71.41	44	Jearoldstown Road	
Washington	Fall Branch	50.38	81.08	50	SR 93 to SR 81 – Fall Branch, Jonesborough	
Sullivan	Kingsport	55.90	89.96	56	Tri-Cities Crossing	
Sullivan	Kingsport	56.81	91.43	57	I-26 / US 23 – Johnson City, Kingsport, Asheville	Signed as exits 57A (east) and 57B (west); exits 8A-B on I-26; former I-181/SR 137
Sullivan	Kingsport	59.26	95.37	59	SR 36 (Fort Henry Drive) – Johnson City, Kingsport, Colonial Heights	
Sullivan	Kingsport	63.17	101.66	63	SR 357 south (Airport Parkway) to SR 75 – Tri-Cities Regional Airport	Access to Northeast State Community College
Sullivan	Kingsport	66.26	106.64	66	SR 126 (Memorial Boulevard) – Blountville, Kingsport	
Sullivan	Blountville	69.32	111.56	69	SR 394 – Blountville, Bristol	Access to Bristol Motor Speedway
Sullivan	Bristol	74.74	120.28	74	US 11W (West State Street) – Kingsport, Bristol	Signed as exits 74A (north) and 74B (south)
Sullivan	Bristol	75.66	121.76		I-81 north – Roanoke	Continuation into Virginia
1.000 mi = 1.609 km; 1.000 km = 0.621 mi

== Auxiliary routes ==
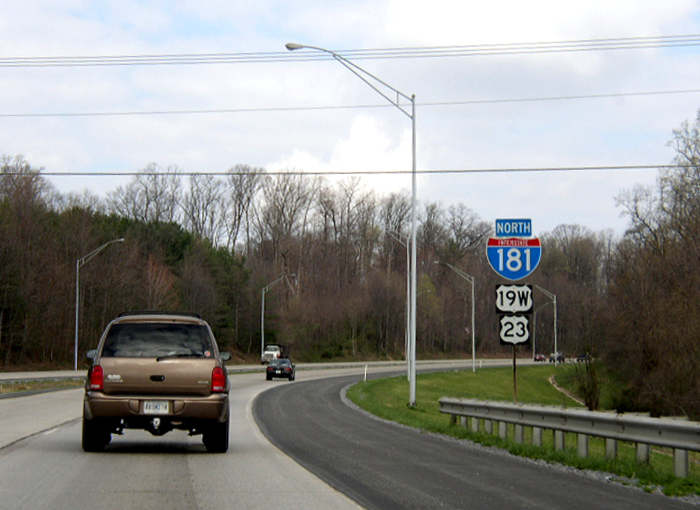
Signage for former I-181, now part of I-26, in Johnson City

Interstate 181 (I-181) was designated by the Federal Highway Administration on December 4, 1985, for the 23.85-mile (38.38 km) controlled-access segment of US 23 between US 321/SR 67 in Johnson City and US 11W in Kingsport, which had been constructed as part of Corridor B of the Appalachian Development Highway System. On June 9, 1986, the designation was officially established by the American Association of State Highway and Transportation Officials (AASHTO). Exit numbers were based on US 23 mileage, which at the time was in the process of being upgraded to a freeway to the North Carolina state line. On August 5, 2003, AASHTO approved extending I-26 west into Tennessee, replacing I-181 from Johnson City to I-81. They ruled against an extension of the I-26 designation along the remainder of I-181 to Kingsport, however, since federal guidelines usually require mainline Interstate Highways to end at a junction with another Interstate Highway, an international border, or a seacoast. TDOT had proposed to renumber that stretch as I-126, but rescinded that proposal later that year. The Safe, Accountable, Flexible, Efficient Transportation Equity Act: A Legacy for Users act, signed into law on August 10, 2005, authorized the remainder of I-181 to be redesignated as part of I-26. This took place in March 2007, when the remainder of I-181 was officially decommissioned and replaced with I-26 signage.

== See also ==
Interstate 81
Previous state: Terminus	Tennessee	Next state: Virginia
