= Ottway, Tennessee =

Unincorporated community in Tennessee, US

Coordinates: 36°16′02″N 82°52′01″W

Ottway is an unincorporated community in northern Greene County, Tennessee. It located a few miles off Tennessee State Route 172. It was the location of Ottway Elementary School until its closure in 2019. The school is now North Greene Middle School.
