= Bloomingdale, Tennessee =

Bloomingdale
- CDP
- Location of Bloomingdale, Tennessee
- Coordinates: 36°34′41″N 82°30′23″W
- Country: United States
- State: Tennessee
- County: Sullivan

Area
  - Total: 9.88 sq mi (25.59 km^{2})
  - Land: 9.88 sq mi (25.59 km^{2})
  - Water: 0 sq mi (0.00 km^{2})
- Elevation: 1,440 ft (439 m)

Population (2020)
  - Total: 8,918
  - Density: 902.6/sq mi (348.51/km^{2})
- Time zone: UTC-5 (Eastern (EST))
  - Summer (DST): UTC-4 (EDT)
- ZIP code: 37660
- Area codes: 423 and 729
- FIPS code: 47-06640
- GNIS feature ID: 1277714

Bloomingdale is a census-designated place (CDP) in Sullivan County, Tennessee.

The population was 8,918 at the 2020 census down from 9,888 at the 2010 census, due to annexation by the City of Kingsport.

It is part of the Kingsport-Bristol-Bristol, TN-VA Metropolitan Statistical Area, which is a component of the Johnson City-Kingsport-Bristol, TN-VA Combined Statistical Area – commonly known as the "Tri-Cities" region.

== Geography ==
Bloomingdale is located at 36°34′41″N 82°30′23″W.

According to the United States Census Bureau, the CDP has a total area of 10.0 square miles (26 km^{2}), all of it land.

== Demographics ==
Historical population
Census	Pop.	Note	%±
2000	10,350		—
2010	9,888		−4.5%
2020	8,918		−9.8%
U.S. Decennial Census

=== 2020 census ===
Bloomingdale racial composition
Race	Number	Percentage
White (non-Hispanic)	8,305	93.13%
Black or African American (non-Hispanic)	51	0.57%
Native American	19	0.21%
Asian	29	0.33%
Pacific Islander	1	0.01%
Other/Mixed	340	3.81%
Hispanic or Latino	173	1.94%

As of the 2020 United States census, there were 8,918 people, 3,977 households, and 2,449 families residing in the CDP.

=== 2000 census ===
As of the census of 2000, there were 10,350 people, 4,264 households, and 3,176 families residing in the CDP. The population density was 1,004.1 inhabitants per square mile (387.7/km^{2}). There were 4,594 housing units at an average density of 445.7 per square mile (172.1/km^{2}). The racial makeup of the CDP was 98.53% White, 0.28% African American, 0.32% Native American, 0.10% Asian, 0.01% Pacific Islander, 0.17% from other races, and 0.59% from two or more races. Hispanic or Latino of any race were 0.78% of the population.

There were 4,264 households, out of which 28.9% had children under the age of 18 living with them, 59.5% were married couples living together, 11.3% had a female householder with no husband present, and 25.5% were non-families. 22.8% of all households were made up of individuals, and 9.5% had someone living alone who was 65 years of age or older. The average household size was 2.42 and the average family size was 2.83.

In the CDP, the population was spread out, with 22.0% under the age of 18, 7.3% from 18 to 24, 28.6% from 25 to 44, 27.3% from 45 to 64, and 14.9% who were 65 years of age or older. The median age was 40 years. For every 100 females, there were 95.2 males. For every 100 females age 18 and over, there were 93.5 males.

The median income for a household in the CDP was $31,096, and the median income for a family was $35,503. Males had a median income of $27,357 versus $18,614 for females. The per capita income for the CDP was $17,241. About 9.6% of families and 12.5% of the population were below the poverty line, including 16.5% of those under age 18 and 13.1% of those age 65 or over.
