= Poor Valley =

Valley in Tennessee and Virginia, US

Coordinates: 36°11′08″N 83°41′44″W

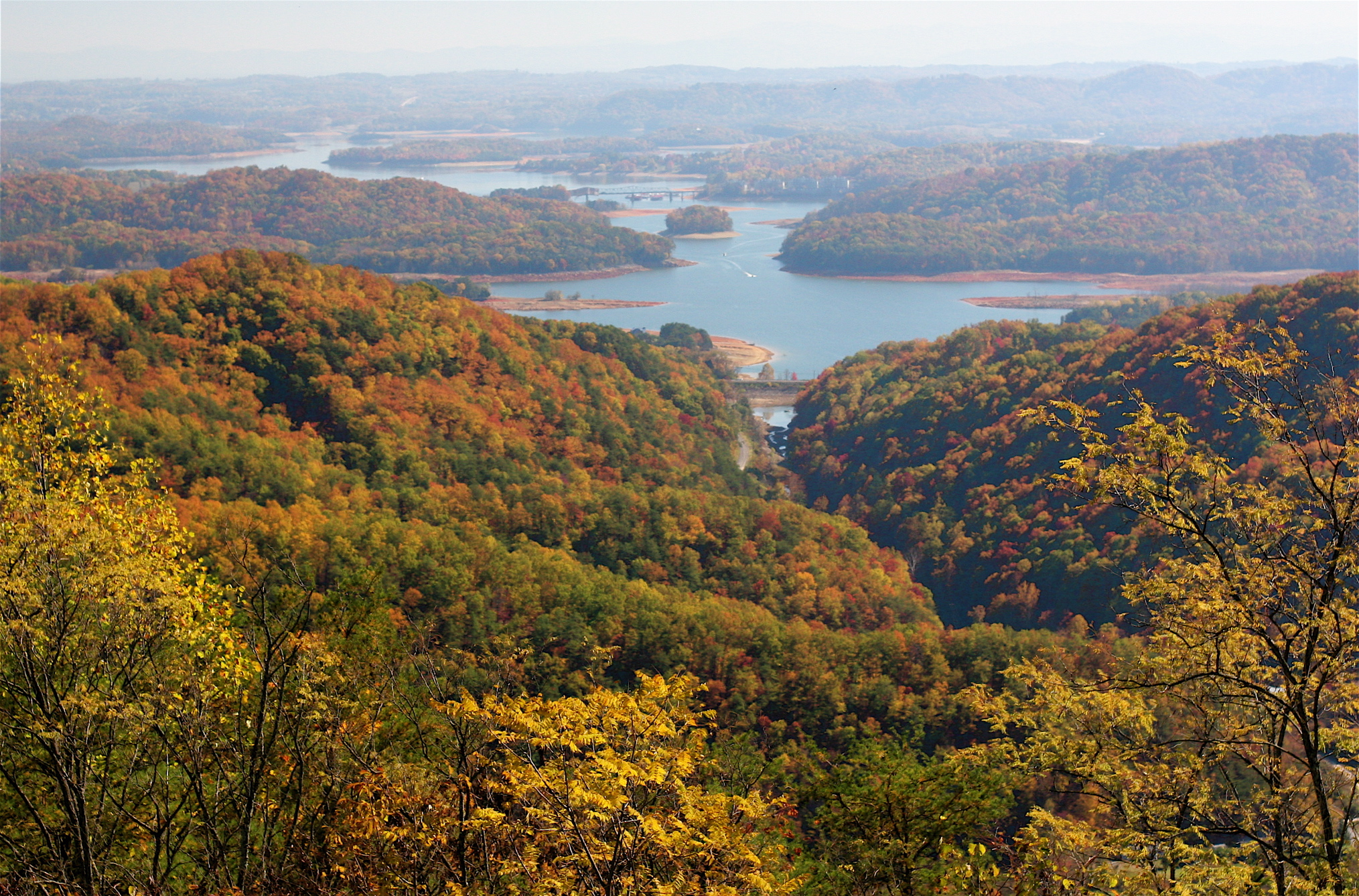
- Cherokee Lake as seen from Clinch Mountain in Poor Valley
- Interactive map of Poor Valley

Poor Valley is a valley in Grainger County, Tennessee, Hawkins County, Tennessee, Hancock County, Tennessee, Scott County, Virginia, Washington County, Virginia, and Smyth County, Virginia, United States. A variant name is Big Poor Valley.

Poor Valley was named from the poor soil found there.

A 1,900-2,200 acre portion of the valley in western Hawkins County was proposed and planned as state park known as Poor Valley State Park in order to promote economic development efforts in the upper East Tennessee region. The plan would stall in the 1970s.
