= Blackwater, Lee County, Virginia =

Unincorporated community in Virginia, United States

Blackwater, Virginia
- Unincorporated community
- Location within Virginia Location within the United States
- Coordinates: 36°37′38″N 83°03′03″W
- Country: United States
- State: Virginia
- County: Lee
- Elevation: 1,217 ft (371 m)
- Time zone: UTC-5 (Eastern (EST))
  - Summer (DST): UTC-4 (EDT)
- ZIP code: 24221
- Area code: 276
- GNIS feature ID: 1477119

Blackwater is an unincorporated community in Lee County, Virginia, United States, along Virginia State Route 70, 5.4 miles (8.7 km) southeast of Jonesville. Its ZIP code is 24221.

== History ==
A post office was established as Black Water in 1874. The community was named from Blackwater Creek.
