= Pressmen's Home, Tennessee =

Former community located near Rogersville, Tennessee

- Pressmen's Home Historic District
- U.S. National Register of Historic Places
- U.S. Historic district
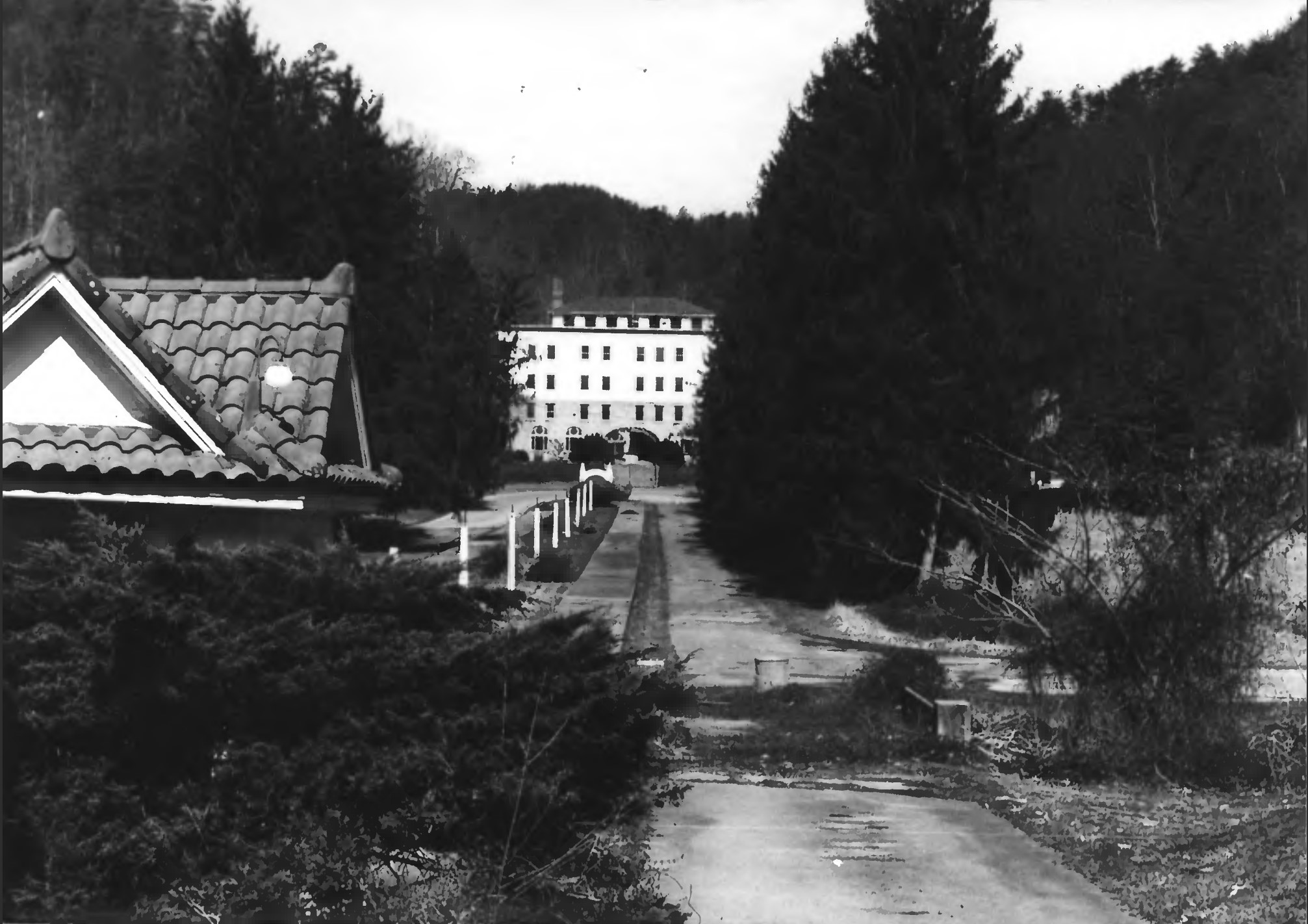
- Mall facing north to Hotel Pressuaina in Pressmen's Home, ca. 1985

- Location within Tennessee Location within the United States
- Location: Tennessee State Route 94, Rogersville, Tennessee
- Nearest city: Rogersville
- Coordinates: 36°27′0″N 83°3′15″W
- Area: 65 acres (26 ha)
- Built: 1910
- Architect: George L. Berry
- Architectural style: Moderne
- NRHP reference No.: 85002970
- Added to NRHP: November 20, 1985

Pressmen's Home is a non-abandoned ghost town and former headquarters for the International Printing Pressmen and Assistants' Union of North America from 1911 to 1967, in the Poor Valley area of Hawkins County, Tennessee, United States, nine miles north of Rogersville. It included a trade school, a sanitarium, a retirement home, a hotel, a post office, a chapel, a hydroelectric power production plant, telecommunication utilities, and other facilities designed to make it a self-sufficient community.

The entire site of the complex is listed on the National Register of Historic Places as a historic district.

== History ==
Pressmen's Home was the brainchild of George L. Berry, who grew up near the site in Hawkins County. After he became president of the Pressmen's Union, he convinced union leaders to purchase the Hale Springs Resort, a mineral springs retreat. The buildings from the resort formed the core of Pressmen's Home around which later facilities were constructed.

As the union grew, so did Pressmen's Home, adding larger and more elaborate facilities. In its heyday, Pressmen's Home was a self-sufficient town that even provided its own electricity (several years before the Tennessee Valley Authority did the same for the rest of Hawkins County).

Beginning in the mid-1960s pressure from competing unions to lobby the U.S. federal government was beginning to convince leaders of the union that their location in rural East Tennessee was becoming detrimental to the interests of the union. The union announced it was moving its headquarters in 1967; lack of funding and merger with other printing unions led to the closure of Pressmen's Home as a retirement facility for union members in 1969.

Since the union left, several schemes have been proposed to revive the site, including tourist resort, retirement community, and even a state penitentiary.

In the 1970s, the site was purchased by an investment group, and was partially re-developed into a resort complex called Camelot, and designated tracts of land on the site to be vacation homes. Several individuals who acquired tracts in the complex discovered that they were on slopes deemed not suitable to build on, and many of these landowners sued the developer. The project was scrapped from further growth due to the developer filing for bankruptcy.

Today the only active project is a golf course and country club that sometimes operates a restaurant and other events. The factory is also still in use. Buildings on the property have fallen into disrepair, been demolished, and several have burned down due to fires that started by accident or by arson.

== Post office ==
Pressmen's Home had a post office from 1914 to 1971. It closed three years after the union moved. A second post office operated in Pressmen's Home as Camelot from 1971 to 1975.

== Major facilities ==
=== Administration Building ===
The Administration Building was built in 1912 and was the original location of the Trade School. After new Trade School facilities were built in 1947, the building housed the executive offices of the union's international president and secretary-treasurer. The Membership Records Department, the Accounting Department, the Service Bureau and the editorial offices were also housed here.

The building was abandoned after the union left Pressmen's Home in 1969.

=== Home Building ===
The Home Building was built in 1911. It was under construction when the union moved its headquarters to Pressmen's Home after purchasing the Hale Springs Resort.

It was built to house the visitors that had formerly visited the Hale Springs (which were believed to have medicinal qualities, due to the high sulphur concentrations in the spring water). The building was home to many international officers while they stayed at Pressmen's Home. After a hotel was completed in 1926, the building became known as simply "The Home," and it was used as an apartment complex for full-time residents. The Home was equipped with a kitchen, dining room, pool room, and other amenities.

This building also fell into disrepair after the Union left in 1969, and was unfortunately lost to an arson fire years later.

=== Tuberculosis sanitorium ===
The sanatorium was built in 1916. In the early years of printing it was thought that exposure to printer's ink was a cause for tuberculosis. The union was interested in the welfare of its members, so the hospital was completely staffed, adequately equipped, and ideally situated for combating the deadly disease within the means of the technology of the times.

Union members who contracted the disease could receive care at no charge. Many who died from the disease are buried in the cemetery at Pressmen's Home.

The building closed in 1961 and was demolished in 1962, to make way for other facilities before the union left.

=== Hotel Pressuaina ===
In 1926, a four-story hotel was built to accommodate union members and their families who came to Pressmen's Home to train at the Trade School.

The hotel's facade was made from sandstone from a quarry located on the premises. The lobby had a beautiful tile floor and an adjacent reading room. Home-cooked meals were prepared for the hotel's guests, largely from on-site facilities that included a dairy farm for milk, chickens for eggs and poultry, a large vegetable garden, and hog lot for pork. The guest rooms were appointed with iron beds and dressers.

The hotel was destroyed in October 1994 by arson.

=== Memorial Chapel ===
The Memorial Chapel was built in 1926 as a non-denominational church dedicated to the memory of union members who died in World War I. Later, the chapel's dedication was expanded to include all people who had served in United States and Canadian military service since that time.

The chapel was designed by architect John Sheridan in the Italianate style and was built of native sandstone. It had stained glass windows from Louis Comfort Tiffany and a fresco painting on its ceiling. At the time of its construction, it was thought to be the only church owned by a labor union. Outside the chapel, in a garden, stood the printing press upon which the design of the union's logo was based.

George L. Berry, the president of the union and founder of Pressmen's Home, was interred in a mausoleum near the chapel. Both the chapel and the mausoleum still stand today, although the Berrys' remains have been relocated to the town cemetery in Rogersville.

=== Trade School building ===
The Trade School building was built in 1948. It was the cornerstone of the educational and training program at Pressman's Home.

The school housed over $500,000 (the equivalent of more than $5.4 million in 2007) in presses and equipment. The school provided training in letterpress, gravure, and offset presses, ink mixing, camera, stripping, platemaking, color separation, and bindery operations. All of the equipment was provided to Pressman's Home by the manufacturer on a loan basis.

This trade school was an attempt by the union to set itself apart from its union competitors. Trainees were required to have been in the union for five years; however, many people from the Hawkins County area were allowed to train at the school at no charge without any experience. The building is still standing and is privately owned. A smaller building behind the trade school building burned on November 24th, 2024, but did not harm the main building.
