= Mooresburg, Tennessee =

Mooresburg
- CDP
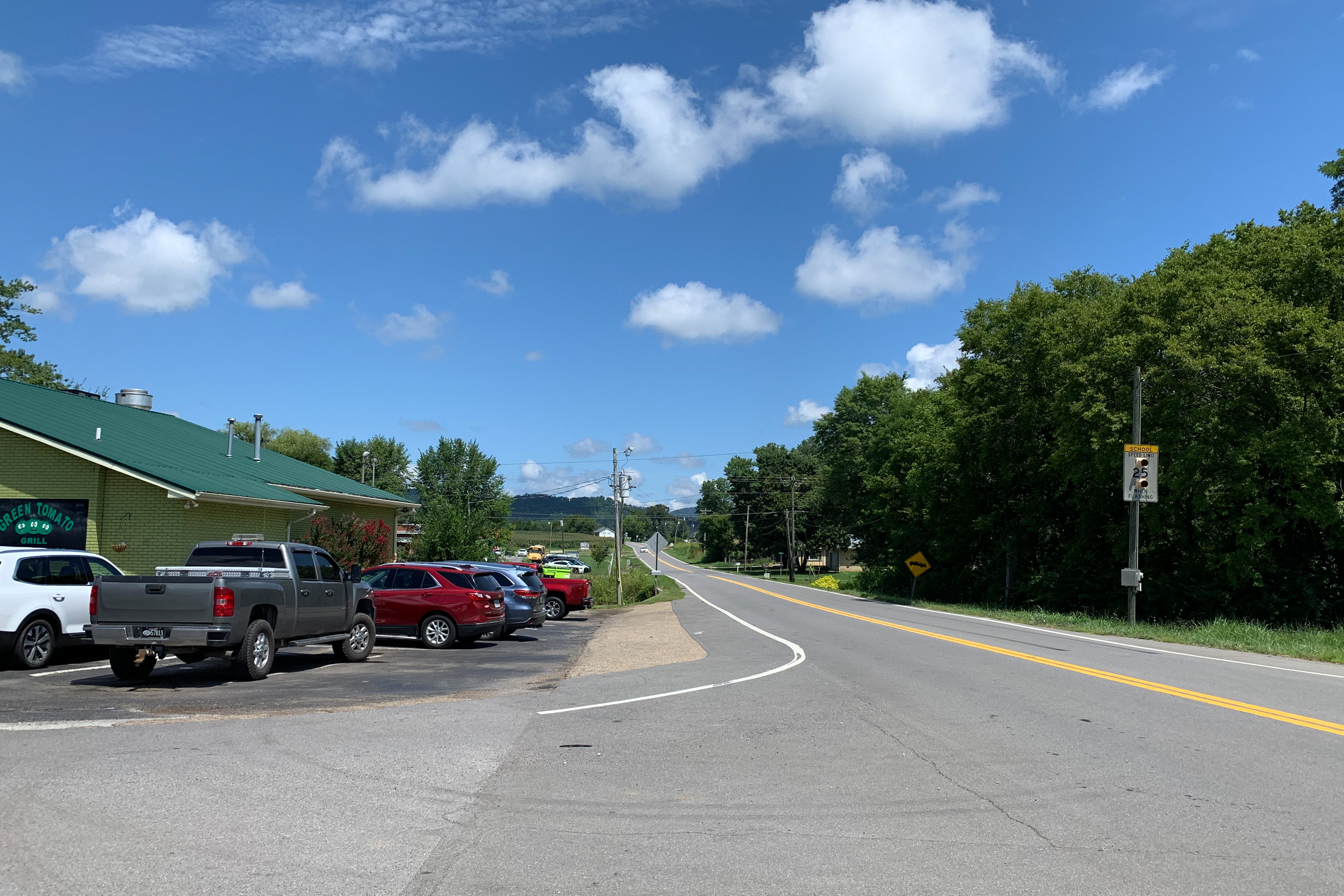

- Location within Tennessee Location within the United States
- Coordinates: 36°20′47″N 83°13′42″W
- Country: United States
- State: Tennessee
- Counties: Hawkins
- Settled: 1800

Area
  - Total: 4.23 sq mi (10.95 km^{2})
  - Land: 3.79 sq mi (9.81 km^{2})
  - Water: 0.44 sq mi (1.15 km^{2})
- Elevation: 1,089 ft (332 m)

Population (2020)
  - Total: 877
  - Density: 231.6/sq mi (89.44/km^{2})
- Time zone: UTC-5 (Eastern (EST))
  - Summer (DST): UTC-4 (EDT)
- ZIP code: 37811
- Area code: 423
- GNIS feature ID: 1294319
- Website: mooresburg.net

Mooresburg is a census-designated place (CDP) and an unincorporated town in Hawkins County, Tennessee. Its population was 941 as of the 2010 census. It is located along U.S. Route 11W between Rogersville and Bean Station.

== Demographics ==
Historical population
Census	Pop.	Note	%±
2020	877		—
U.S. Decennial Census

== History ==
Mooresburg was named for Major Hugh Moore, whose family settled in the area around 1800. Hugh had purchased over several thousands and laid out the setting for the town of Mooresburg.

Mooresburg has a post office with ZIP code 37811, which opened on March 4, 1814.

Following the impoundment of the Holston River by the Tennessee Valley Authority in the 1941, many property owners were relocated to make way for Cherokee Lake. In the 1970s, the community was impacted by the construction of U.S. Route 11W into a four-lane limited-access highway.

In 1977, 100 acres of Mooresburg was proposed to be inside the city limits of Bean Station during an incorporation vote. However voters in both Grainger and Hawkins counties rejected to incorporate.

From its first unveiling in the 1940s, over 1,900-2,200 acres of undisturbed forest north of the community was proposed and planned as state park known as Poor Valley State Park in order to promote economic development efforts in the upper East Tennessee region, the plan would stall in the 1970s.

== Education ==
Mooresburg Elementary School serves grades K-5. Mooresburg Elementary School's mascot is the Mustangs. The motto is "Excellence: Not Optional." The school colors are blue and white.

== Infrastructure ==
Mooresburg is served by the Lakeview Volunteer Fire Department.

== Notable people ==
- Scott Bloomquist - Dirt Racing Champion and NASCAR Driver
- Jim Mooney - MLB pitcher
