= Kyles Ford, Tennessee =

Kyles Ford
- Unincorporated community
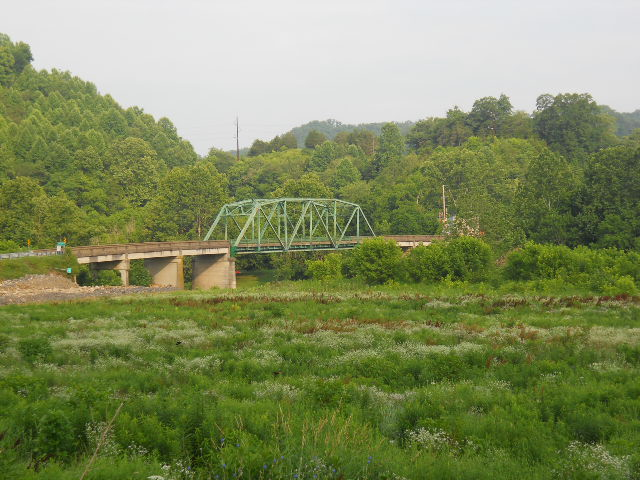
- Edward R. Talley bridge over Kyles Ford

- Location within Tennessee Location within the United States
- Coordinates: 36°34′15″N 83°02′36″W
- Country: United States
- State: Tennessee
- County: Hancock
- Settled: 1790s
- Named for: Robert Kyle Sr.
- Elevation: 1,175 ft (358 m)
- Time zone: UTC-5 (Eastern (EST))
  - Summer (DST): UTC-4 (EDT)
- Zip Code: 37765
- Area code: 423
- GNIS feature ID: 1290427

Kyles Ford is an unincorporated community in Hancock County in the U.S. state of Tennessee. It is located along the Upper Clinch River and houses the TWRA's Kyles Ford Wildlife Management Area. A portion of Kyles Ford is included in an 850-acre (3.4 km^{2}) parcel of land referred to as the Kyles Ford Preserve. The parcel was acquired by TWRA in partnership with The Nature Conservancy and other conservation groups in a combined effort to preserve the area's rare, threatened, and endangered species of freshwater mussels. The concerned area of the Upper Tennessee River watershed that includes the Powell River Tributary, contains the most biologically diverse concentration of freshwater mussels in the Continental United States. It is also among the most degraded and threatened concentrations of mussels, containing some species that are globally unique.

Clinch-Powell Resource Conservation and Development has been instrumental in working with the Kyles Ford Community in developing portions of the preserve with educational and low-impact ecotourism facilities such as The Clinch River Conservation Retreat and River Place on the Clinch as a means of raising awareness and supplementing the funding of ongoing Appalachian cultural and biodiversity research and preservation efforts related to the area.

== History ==
Prior to any European settlement, a few Cherokee hunted along the Clinch River. Longhunter Elisha Wallen (born 1732) and his brother Joseph Wallen (born 1734) explored the area in 1762. Later in 1787, Joseph obtained a 640-acre land grant from the state of North Carolina (#401) for his service in the Revolutionary War. This land was located on the north side of the Clinch River of what was then Hawkins County, North Carolina (now Hancock County, Tennessee). The Trail of the Lonesome Pine runs through Highway 70 just a few miles from the Wilderness Road in Virginia. Early settlers from Virginia took this trail during the 1790s. Others from the Carter Valley settlement traveled north and crossed Clinch Mountain. Robert Kyle Sr. (born 1751) and his family moved to the area in 1801. A ford on the Clinch River was named after him. The community of Kyles Ford was part of the Wallen District of Hancock County in 1860 (which today is the 4th district).

Kyles Ford had its own post office, established on April 20, 1871, and was held at Wallen's Grocery for many years. Mail for the Kyles Ford area was contracted to the Sneedville post office in 1988, retaining the route and 37765 zip code. The original post office at Kyles Ford was discontinued on March 18, 1997.

== Infrastructure ==
The Edward R. Talley bridge was built over Kyles Ford in 1928, replacing a toll ferry. After many years of use, the Tennessee Department of Transportation decided to have the Edward R. Talley Bridge to be decommissioned. For two years, a new bridge was built alongside it, and was opened on October 12, 2015.

== Education ==
Several churches in the community taught school for many years. Kyles Ford Elementary was an early public school, originally located along Highway 70 North. After a fire on October 14, 1937, it was rebuilt at its present location along Highway 33. A gym and cafeteria were later added in 1965-1966. The basketball teams for Kyles Ford Elementary were first the Indians, then later the Cougars. When the new Hancock County Elementary School was complete by 2001-2002, students from Kyles Ford were rezoned there.

== Notable people ==
- Ermal Allen, American football player and coach.

== Bibliography ==
- "Kyles Ford". Geographic Names Information System. United States Geological Survey.
- "Noteworthy DOI Accomplishments in Tennessee". National Business Center. Department of the Interior. January 22, 2004. Archived from the original on September 30, 2006.
- "The Nature Conservancy Protects Site on Clinch River" (Press release). The Nature Conservancy via EcoWorld. 2007. Archived from the original on July 14, 2007.
- "Clinch River". The Nature Conservancy. 2007.
