= List of former primary state highways in Virginia (Bristol District) =

The following is a list of former primary state highways completely or mostly within the Bristol District (VDOT District 1) of the U.S. state of Virginia.

== SR 62 ==
State Route 62
- Location: Ewing-Tennessee
- Existed: 1928–1942

State Route 62 extended south along current secondary SR 744 from US 58 (now US 58 Business) east of Ewing to the Tennessee state line, continuing as an unnumbered county road in the direction of Alanthus Hill and Tennessee State Route 63. It was added to the state highway system in 1928 as State Route 101, changed to SR 62 in the 1933 renumbering, and downgraded to secondary in 1942.

== SR 63 ==
State Route 63
- Location: US 58-Tennessee
- Existed: 1928–1946

State Route 63 extended south along current secondary SR 758 from US 58 between Beech Spring and Jonesville across the Powell River on Flanary Bridge to the Tennessee state line, continuing as an unnumbered county road in the direction of Tennessee State Route 63 at Mulberry Gap. 6.2 miles (10.0 km) of road, a majority of the route, was added to the state highway system in 1928 as State Route 102, which was extended another 1.2 miles (1.9 km) in 1930. In the 1933 renumbering, SR 102 became SR 63, which was extended the final 1/2 mile (0.80 km) to the state line in October 1933 and downgraded to secondary in 1946.

== SR 65 ==
State Route 65
- Location: Woodway-northeast
- Existed: 1918–1943

State Route 65 extended northeast along part of current secondary SR 642 from SR 66 (now SR 785, bypassed by modern US 421) at Woodway to SR 64 (now US 58 Alternate) between Dryden and Deep Springs. (SR 642 continues southwest from Woodway to a dead end near the Powell River, and used to extend across the river and along present SR 640, SR 783, and SR 614 to SR 654 southwest of Jonesville.) It was added to the state highway system as part of State Route 11 in the original network defined by the state legislature in 1918, and kept that number until the 1933 renumbering, when it became part of State Route 64. The last piece of the shortcut east from Pennington Gap that US 58 Alt. now follows was added in 1937 as part of SR 66, and in the 1940 renumbering, SR 70 (replacement for most of SR 64) used this cutoff, with the former route northeast of Woodway becoming a new SR 65. SR 65 was downgraded to secondary in 1943 as an extension of existing SR 642.

== SR 69 ==
State Route 69
- Location: Kent Junction-Dunbar
- Existed: 1930–1951

State Route 69 paralleled a branch of the Interstate Railroad along most of present SR 603, from US 23 (now US 23 Business) at Kent Junction north to Dunbar (SR 603 continued another 2.1 miles (3.4 km) to Pardee, which was mentioned as an eventual endpoint in descriptions of SR 69). 2.8 miles (4.5 km) of the route was added to the state highway system in 1930 as State Route 133, which was extended another 3 miles (4.8 km) to Dunbar in 1932. SR 133 became SR 69 in the 1933 renumbering and was downgraded to secondary in 1951 as an extension of existing SR 603.

== SR 73 ==
State Route 73
- Location: Norton-south
- Existed: 1932–ca. 1949

State Route 73 followed present secondary SR 619 from US 23 (now US 23 Business) at the intersection of Main Avenue and 12th Street in Norton south past High Knob to the Wise-Scott County line in the direction of Fort Blackmore. Most of the route was added to the state highway system in 1932, with no number given, and assigned SR 73 in the 1933 renumbering. SR 73 was extended the remaining 0.4 miles (0.64 km) to the county line (replacing SR 619, which continued to exist in Scott County) in 1937, but in 1948 it was downgraded to secondary effective completion of ongoing construction work, for which the contract was awarded in November 1948.

== SR 74 ==
State Route 74
- Location: Bolton-southwest
- Existed: 1930–1942

State Route 74 extended southwest from SR 64 (now US 58 Alternate) at Bolton along current SR 613 down the valley of Big Moccasin Creek past Willow Spring to about 1/4 mile (0.40 km) beyond the intersection with SR 606. (SR 613 continues southwest to SR 71 near Snowflake.) 4.1 miles (6.6 km) out of Bolton were added to the state highway system in 1930 as State Route 134, which was extended another 2.2 miles (3.5 km) in 1932. SR 134 became SR 74 in the 1933 renumbering and was downgraded to secondary in 1942 as an extension of existing SR 613.

== SR 76 ==
State Route 76
- Location: Bristol-northeast
- Existed: 1928–1970

State Route 76 extended northeast from downtown Bristol to US 11 south of Wallace via Kingtown. The former route, which mostly followed King Mill Pike, Old Airport Road, and Bonham Road, is now located entirely within Bristol city limits.

3.24 miles (5.21 km) of road from Bristol towards Kings Mill (now Cleveland, southwest of Green Spring) were added to the state highway system in 1928 as State Route 109, but in reality the route left King Mill Pike about 2 miles (3.2 km) out of Bristol, turning northeast on Old Airport Road. The remainder to US 11 was added in 1930, and in 1932 the routing in Bristol was defined, beginning at the city limits on Massachusetts Avenue near Concord Street (halfway between Montpelier Avenue and Madison Street) and following Fairview Street, Danville Avenue, and Goodson Street. Primary extension funding was assigned to two routes down to State Street (US 421), one directly down Goodson Street and the other turning west on Mary Street and southwest approximately along modern MLK Boulevard. SR 109 became SR 76 in the 1933 renumbering. An extra 3/4 mile (1.2 km) was added in 1934, but the 1932 official Washington County map shows that the route was already complete.

SR 76 followed Goodson Street all the way to State Street by 1936, and State Route 76Y was on Mary Street by 1941, with its west end at Oakview Avenue (then US 11, now SR 113). In 1947, SR 76 swapped with SR 658 at its north end, moving from Old Airport Road to Bonham Road, and the routing in downtown Bristol was modified slightly in 1952. In 1966, SR 76 and SR 76Y were removed from Bristol altogether, with a portion on Goodson and Mary Streets becoming a realigned US 421. The remaining 3 miles (4.8 km) of SR 76 lying outside Bristol were downgraded to secondary SR 895 in 1970; SR 895 itself was later swallowed up by the expanding city limits of Bristol.

== SR 77 ==
State Route 77
- Existed: 1932–1942

State Route 77 extended northeast along part of current secondary SR 700 from US 58 northwest of Three Springs, via Benhams, to a point about 1/4 mile (0.40 km) beyond SR 640. The route was added to the state highway system in 1932, with no number given, and became SR 75 in the 1933 renumbering. (The descriptions from 1932 and 1933 indicate that it was intended to reach SR 42, now SR 802, in the future, but don't give any details on how it would have crossed the ridges in between.) The numbers 75 and 77 were swapped in the 1940 renumbering to free up SR 75 to match Tennessee (which never happened), but only two years later the newly-designated State Route 77 was downgraded to secondary as an extension of existing SR 700.

== SR 78 ==
State Route 78
- Location: Gratton-Burkes Garden
- Existed: 1930–1944

State Route 78 extended southeast from SR 61 at Gratton along present secondary SR 623 in Bland and Tazewell counties (the old Tazewell Courthouse and Fancy Gap Turnpike) over Rich Mountain and into Burkes Garden, ending about 1/4 mile (0.40 km) short of SR 625. 7 miles (11 km) of the road was added to the state highway system in 1930 as State Route 136, which was extended another 1 mile (1.6 km) in 1932. In the 1933 renumbering, SR 136 became State Route 87 (where the description included a planned extension to SR 42 at Sharon Springs), which became SR 78 in the 1940 renumbering (since SR 87 was needed to match North Carolina) and was downgraded to secondary in 1944 as an extension of existing SR 623.

== SR 79 ==
State Route 79
- Location: Lodi-Chilhowie
- Existed: 1930–1953

State Route 79 followed present secondary SR 762 from SR 91 north of Lodi east to St. Clair Bottom (where SR 79 included a now-bypassed piece of SR 600) and north to US 11 in Chilhowie. The first 1.9 miles (3.1 km) out of Chilhowie were added to the state highway system in 1930 as State Route 135, which was extended another 2.1 miles (3.4 km) to St. Clair Bottom in 1931 and became SR 79 in the 1933 renumbering.

In 1945, the portion of SR 81 from St. Clair Bottom east to Dickey Gap became secondary SR 650, and SR 79 was extended west from St. Clair Bottom to Lodi to replace the now-disconnected western segment of SR 81. (This road had been defined at the route of SR 12 in 1924, and became US 58 in 1933 and SR 81 in 1940.) All of SR 79 was downgraded to secondary in 1953, but a short piece in Chilhowie, north of the new Interstate 81, became part of SR 107 in 1968.

Major intersections

County	Location	mi	km	Destinations	Notes
Washington		0.00	0.00	SR 91 (Monroe Road)	
Smyth				SR 600 (Whitetop Road)	to Whitetop Mountain
Smyth	St. Clair Bottom			SR 660 (Riverside Road)	former SR 81 east
Smyth	Chilhowie	12.35	19.88	US 11 (Lee Highway) – Abingdon, Marion	
1.000 mi = 1.609 km; 1.000 km = 0.621 mi

== SR 89 ==
State Route 89
- Location: Wytheville
- Existed: 1928–1938

State Route 89 extended southwest along current secondary SR 667 from US 21 (now 18th Street) in Wytheville to SR 654 at the Wytheville National Fish Hatchery. It was added to the state highway system in 1928 as State Route 114, renumbered SR 89 in the 1933 renumbering, and downgraded to secondary in 1938 as an extension of existing SR 667.

== SR 95 ==
State Route 95
- Location: Dry Run Gap–Providence
- Existed: 1928–1953

State Route 95 extended east along current secondary SR 805 from US 21 south of Dry Run Gap to SR 94 (now SR 649) at Providence, passing near Spring Valley. The easternmost 4.5 miles (7.2 km) were added to the state highway system in 1928 as State Route 118, which was extended another 5.1 miles (8.2 km) in 1930 and the remaining 1.9 miles (3.1 km) in 1932. SR 118 became SR 95 in the 1933 renumbering and was downgraded to secondary in 1953.

== SR 289 ==
State Route 289
- Location: south of Wytheville
- Existed: 1934–1942

State Route 289 was a 680 feet (210 m) long route spurring east from US 21 south of Wytheville on what is now the beginning of secondary State Route 696 (Barrett Mill Road). It was added to the primary system in 1934, on new alignment that connected a realigned US 21 to what was then part of SR 644, and downgraded to secondary in 1942.
