= U.S. Route 421 in Virginia =

Segment of American highway

U.S. Route 421
- US 421 highlighted in red

Route information
- Maintained by VDOT
- Length: 69.23 mi (111.41 km)
- Existed: ca. 1950–present
- Tourist routes: Virginia Byway

Major junctions
- South end: US 421 / SR 34 in Bristol
- US 11 / US 11E / US 19 / SR 381 in Bristol; US 11W / SR 1 in Bristol; I-81 / US 58 in Bristol; SR 224 near Weber City; US 23 in Weber City; SR 65 in Clinchport; US 58 at Dot; US 58 Alt. in Pennington Gap; SR 352 near St. Charles
- North end: US 421 near St. Charles

Location
- Country: United States
- State: Virginia
- Counties: City of Bristol, Washington, Scott, Lee

Highway system
- United States Numbered Highway System; List; Special; Divided; Virginia Routes; Interstate; US; Primary; Secondary; Byways; History; HOT lanes
← SR 420	→ SR 457

U.S. Route 421 (US 421) is a part of the U.S. Highway System that runs from Fort Fisher, North Carolina to Michigan City, Indiana. In Virginia, the U.S. Highway runs 69.23 miles (111.41 km) from the Tennessee state line between the twin cities of Bristol, Tennessee and Bristol, Virginia north and west to the Kentucky state line near St. Charles. Between its endpoints, US 421 has lengthy concurrencies with US 23 and US 58 during its course through Bristol, Weber City, Gate City, Duffield, and Pennington Gap in Southwest Virginia.

== Route description ==
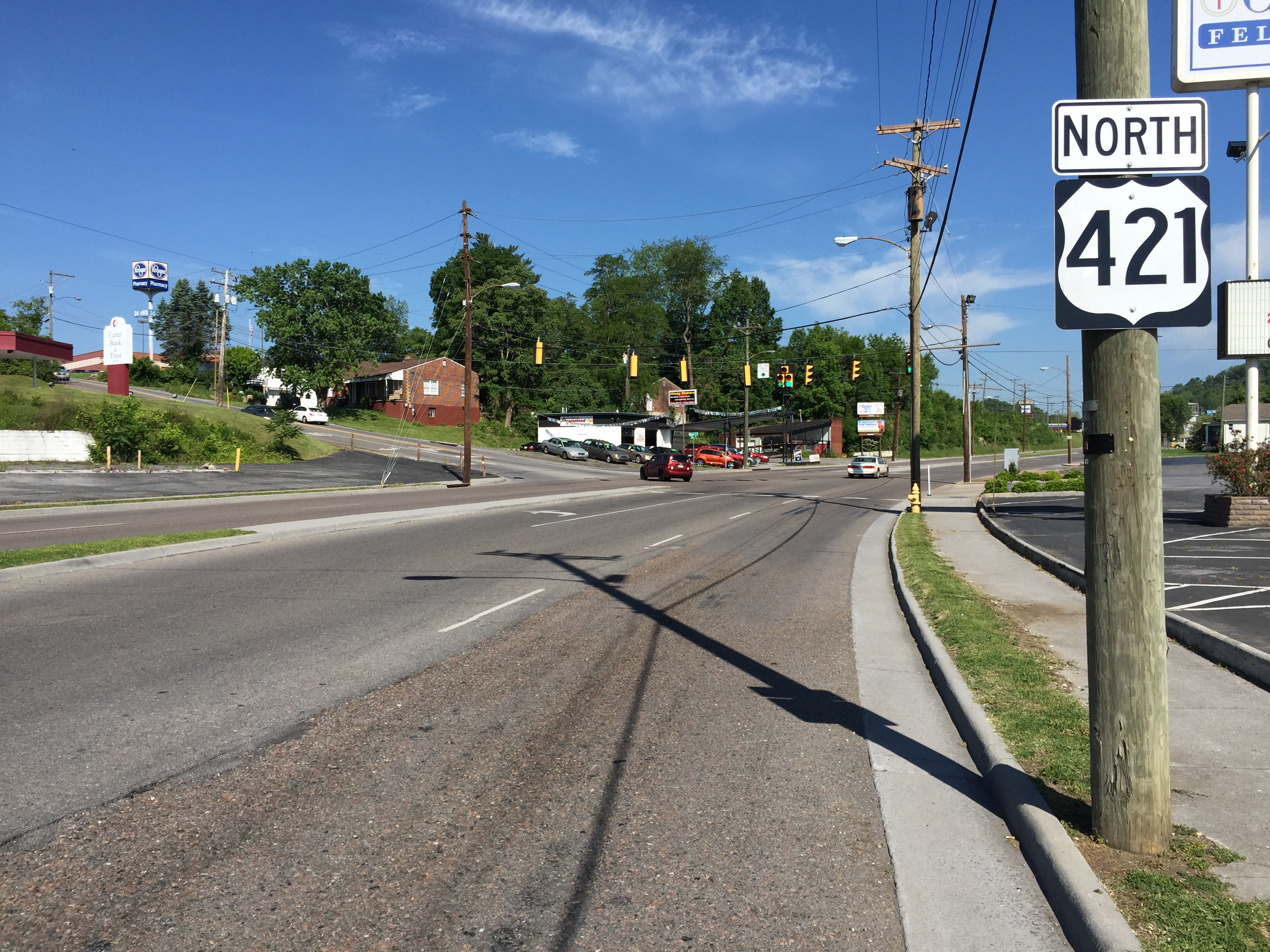
View north along US 421 at US 11W in Bristol

US 421 enters Virginia at State Street, which follows the boundary between Bristol, Virginia, and Bristol, Tennessee, and heads north on Commonwealth Avenue, which also carries US 11E, US 19, and SR 381. Prior to spring 2011, US 421 followed a more convoluted routing on Martin Luther King Jr. Boulevard, Cumberland Street, Piedmont Avenue, and Goode Street (all but MLK also being U.S. Route 11-19 Truck).

US 421, US 11E, US 19, and SR 381 meet the southern end of SR 113 at separate intersections: Cumberland Street carries northbound SR 113 east and Sycamore Street carries the westbound direction. The four highways continue north to east–west Euclid Avenue, where US 11E has its northern terminus. SR 381 continues north along Commonwealth Avenue to the southern end of Interstate 381 (I-381), a spur south from I-81. US 19 turns east to join US 11 on eastbound Euclid Avenue. US 421 turns west onto four-lane divided Euclid Avenue and runs concurrently with US 11W, which has its terminus at the intersection. The two highways cross Norfolk Southern's Appalachia Division rail line at grade and pass Devault Memorial Stadium, home of the Bristol Pirates. US 11W and US 421 diverge an at intersection with Tennessee State Route 1 (State Street) at the state line. US 11W continues into Bristol, Tennessee as State Street while US 421 heads northwest on Gate City Highway. The U.S. Highway passes the Hard Rock Hotel & Casino Bristol before meeting I-81 at a partial cloverleaf interchange, where US 58 exits I-81 and joins US 421 in a concurrency.

US 421 and US 58 exit the city of Bristol and enter Washington County as a two-lane undivided road. The U.S. Highways head northwest through gaps in Big Ridge, Walker Mountain, then curve southwest through the Rich Valley. At the Washington–Scott county line, US 421 and US 58 veer northwest again and follow a curvaceous path through Shelly Ridge and Cove Ridge, after which the highways follow Cove Creek southwest through the valley of the North Fork Holston River until the highways turn northwest, cross the river, and pass through Hilton Gap in Pine Ridge. The highways pass through the village of Hiltons and parallel the Appalachia Division rail line southwest through the Poor Valley to the town of Weber City, where the highways meet the northern end of SR 224 (Wadlow Gap Road), cross Moccasin Creek, and intersect US 23 (Main Street).

US 421, US 23, and US 58 run concurrently with the Appalachia Division rail line through Moccasin Gap, where Moccasin Creek passes through Clinch Mountain. The U.S. Highways enter the town of Gate City; three congruent business routes pass through the center of town while the mainline of the U.S. Highways follows the flank of Clinch Mountain to the south of town. US 421, US 23, and US 58 receive their three business routes at an interchange west of Gate City. The U.S. Highways parallel the railroad and Little Moccasin Creek west between Clinch Mountain to the south and Moccasin Ridge to the north. The highways curve north and parallel the Clinch River to Clinchport, where the road meets the southern end of SR 65 and begins to follow Stock Creek. US 421, US 23, and US 58 pass by Glenita, where the railroad splits north to pass through the Natural Tunnel, the centerpiece of Natural Tunnel State Park. After passing through the Devil's Racepath, US 58 and US 421 split west from US 23 (Orby Cantrell Highway) as Daniel Boone Trail just south of the town of Duffield.

US 421 and US 58 head west as a two-lane undivided road that crosses the North Fork of the Clinch River and ascends Powell Mountain, on top of which the highways enter Lee County. The U.S. Highways descend the mountain to Wallens Creek, then pass through several sweeping curves before diverging at the hamlet of Dot. US 421 heads northwest and passes through the hamlet of Woodway before crossing the Powell River. The U.S. Highway follows the North Fork of the Powell River to the town of Pennington Gap, where the highway passes under the Appalachia Division rail line intersects US 58 Alternate (Trail of the Lonesome Pine). US 421 and US 58 Alternate head through the center of town along Morgan Avenue before US 421 heads out of town along the North Fork of the Powell River and the rail line through Pennington Gap, which is a water gap through Stone Mountain. At Stone Creek north of the gap, US 421 meets the southern end of SR 352 (St. Charles Road), which serves the town of St. Charles to the north. The U.S. Highway heads west, following Stone Creek to its source near the Kentucky state line, which coincides with the Tennessee Valley Divide, from which US 421 continues northwest toward Harlan.

== History ==
The majority of US 421 in Virginia, from Pennington Gap east to Bristol, was designated as part of State Route 10 in 1918; the rest was not a state highway until the late 1920s. The east (south) three miles (5 km) were added as State Route 104 in 1928, taking it to the present State Route 352 junction at Stone Creek; St. Charles (accessed via SR 352) was used as the eventual end. However, it was instead extended west to the Kentucky state line, with 2.25 miles (3.5 km) added in 1931 and the rest, another 2.25 miles (3.62 km), in 1932. (SR 352 was added in 1942, completing the route to St. Charles.)

In the 1933 renumbering, SR 104 became State Route 65. It was soon extended southeast along former SR 10 from Pennington Gap to Dot, when U.S. Route 58 was removed from it in favor of a shorter alignment. SR 65 became part of State Route 66, which continued east from Dot to south of St. Paul along former State Route 70, in the 1940 renumbering, as Kentucky had taken over its continuation as Kentucky Route 66.

In the meantime, the route from Cumberland Gap to Bristol had been through several changes in numbering. It was assigned U.S. Route 411 in 1926, renumbered as part of U.S. Route 58 in the early 1930s, and supplemented with U.S. Route 421 from the 1930s to the late 1940s. By 1951, US 421 had re-entered Virginia, this time splitting from US 58 at Dot to cross into Kentucky, causing State Route 66 to be truncated at Clinchport. US 58 was moved to Interstate 81 between Bristol and Abingdon by the end of 1965, leaving US 421 on its own from I-81 west of Bristol to U.S. Route 11W at the intersection of State Street and Euclid Avenue west of downtown Bristol. (Its easternmost several blocks on State Street (east of U.S. Route 11E) had also been separate since its creation in the 1930s.)

=== Routing in Bristol ===
Map of US 421 through Bristol, VA

The earliest alignment in Bristol came to the state line on Pennsylvania Avenue in Bristol, Tennessee (still US 421 today) and turned west on State Street to end at U.S. Route 11E a few blocks later, at or near Edgemont Avenue. This was initially part of U.S. Route 321 but soon became US 421. When it was extended west, it was taken along US 11E to Piedmont Avenue (U.S. Route 11) and U.S. Route 11W to Euclid Avenue, where it curved northwest onto what had been U.S. Route 411. Soon U.S. Route 58 came in from the northeast along with US 11, leaving only the piece east of US 11E on its own.

A traffic survey resulted in the creation of a one-way pair in 1952, where southbound US 421 used Shelby Street, a block south of State Street in Tennessee, between Ninth Street (Commonwealth Avenue) and Fourth Street (Edgemont Avenue). US 58 eastbound moved to the same alignment, but turned north at Seventh Street to reach Piedmont Avenue. With the completion of Euclid Avenue in 1967, US 421 was realigned again to use Euclid Avenue from the west end of State Street northeast (with US 58 and other routes) to Piedmont Avenue. There it turned southeast on Piedmont Avenue and Mary Street and southwest on Goodson Street, crossing the state line directly onto Pennsylvania Avenue. This had been State Route 76-Y along Mary Street east of Oakview Avenue (old U.S. Route 11, new State Route 113) and part of State Route 76 along Goodson Street. The present alignment of US 421 through Bristol, using Commonwealth Avenue, Goode Street, Piedmont Avenue, Cumberland Street, Randall Street, and State Street, was adopted in 1984, at the same time as U.S. Route 11/19 Truck was established along much of the same routing.

== Major intersections ==
County	Location	mi	km	Destinations	Notes
City of Bristol		0.00	0.00	US 11E south / US 19 south / US 421 south (Volunteer Parkway)	Continuation into Tennessee
City of Bristol		0.00	0.00	SR 1 west (State Street)	South end of SR 381 overlap
City of Bristol		0.08	0.13	US 11 Truck / US 19 Truck north (Goode Street)	South end of US 11 Truck / US 19 Truck overlap
City of Bristol		0.58	0.93	US 11W begins / US 11E / US 11 Truck / US 19 Truck end / US 11 / US 19 north (Euclid Avenue east) / SR 381 north (Commonwealth Avenue north) to I-81	North end of US 11E / US 19 / US 11 Truck / US 19 Truck / SR 381 overlap; south end of US 11W overlap
City of Bristol		1.35	2.17	US 11W south (State Street / SR 1)	North end of US 11W overlap
City of Bristol		2.36	3.80	I-81 / US 58 east – Knoxville, Roanoke	I-81 exit 1; south end of concurrency with US 58
see US 58 (mile 95.67-42.51) and US 23 (mile 2.92-20.85)
Lee	Dot	56.12	90.32	US 58 west (Wilderness Road) – Jonesville, Cumberland Gap	North end of concurrency with US 58
Lee	Woodway			SR 642 (Hickory Flats Road / Old Woodway Road)	Former SR 65 east
Lee	Pennington Gap	61.33	98.70	US 58 Alt. east (East Morgan Avenue) – Big Stone Gap, Norton	South end of concurrency with US 58 Alternate
Lee	Pennington Gap	61.73	99.34	US 58 Alt. west (East Morgan Avenue) – Jonesville	North end of concurrency with US 58 Alternate
Lee	Stone Creek			SR 606 (Boblink Drive) to SR 68 – Robbins Chapel, Keokee	
Lee	Stone Creek	64.68	104.09	SR 352 north (Saint Charles Road) – St. Charles	
Lee		69.23	111.41	US 421 north – Harlan	Continuation into Kentucky over the Tennessee Valley Divide
1.000 mi = 1.609 km; 1.000 km = 0.621 mi: Concurrency terminus

== See also ==
- Special routes of U.S. Route 421

U.S. Route 421
Previous state: Tennessee	Virginia	Next state: Kentucky
