= Virginia State Route 352 =

State highway in Lee County, Virginia, US

State Route 352
- St. Charles Road

Route information
- Maintained by VDOT
- Length: 2.40 mi (3.86 km)
- Existed: 1942–present
- Tourist routes: Virginia Byway

Major junctions
- South end: US 421 near Pennington Gap
- North end: SR 634 / SR 636 in St. Charles

Location
- Country: United States
- State: Virginia
- Counties: Lee

Highway system
- Virginia Routes; Interstate; US; Primary; Secondary; Byways; History; HOT lanes
← SR 351	→ SR 353

State Route 352 (SR 352) is a primary state highway in the U.S. state of Virginia. Known as St. Charles Road, the state highway runs 2.40 miles (3.86 km) from U.S. Route 421 (US 421) near Pennington Gap to SR 634 and SR 636 in St. Charles in northern Lee County.

== Route description ==
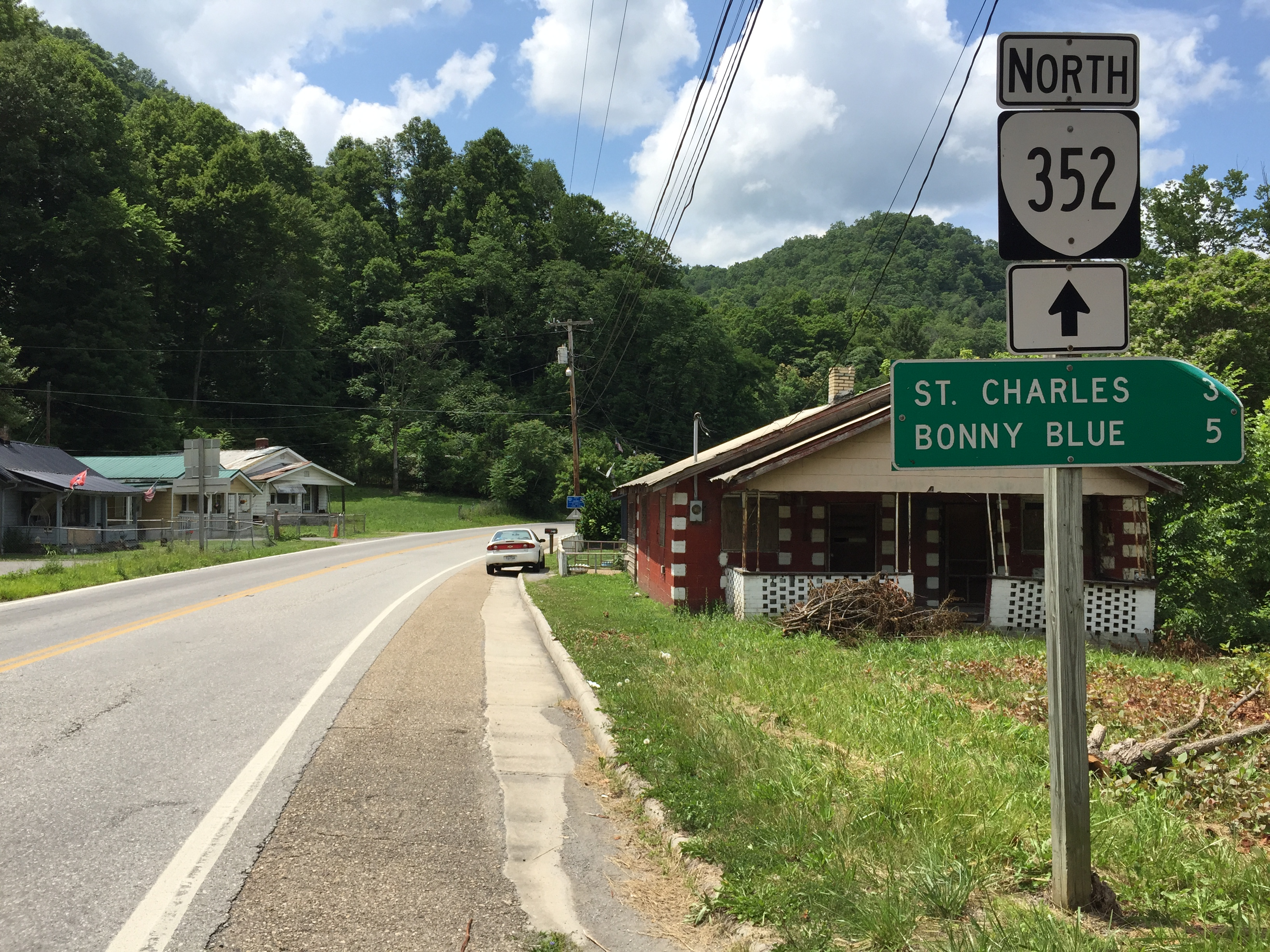
View north at the south end of SR 352 at US 421 near Pennington Gap

SR 352 begins at an intersection with US 421 on the north side of Stone Mountain and west of Pennington Gap. The state highway follows Straight Creek and Norfolk Southern's St. Charles Branch rail line north to the town of St. Charles. Within the town, the state highway reaches its northern terminus at a three-way intersection with SR 634 (Bonny Blue Road) and SR 636 (Monarch Road).

== Major intersections ==
The entire route is in Lee County.

Location	mi	km	Destinations	Notes
Stone Creek	0.00	0.00	US 421 – Pennington Gap, Harlan	Southern terminus
St. Charles	2.40	3.86	SR 634 (Bonny Blue Road) / SR 636 (Monarch Road) – Bonny Blue	Northern terminus
1.000 mi = 1.609 km; 1.000 km = 0.621 mi
