= Virginia State Route 61 =

State highway in western Virginia, US

State Route 61

Route information
- Maintained by VDOT
- Length: 48.16 mi (77.51 km)
- Existed: 1933–present

Major junctions
- West end: SR 16 in Tazewell
- US 19 / US 460 in Tazewell; US 52 in Rocky Gap; I-77 in Rocky Gap; SR 100 in Narrows
- East end: US 460 in Narrows

Location
- Country: United States
- State: Virginia
- Counties: Tazewell, Bland, Giles

Highway system
- Virginia Routes; Interstate; US; Primary; Secondary; Byways; History; HOT lanes
← US 60	→ SR 62

State Route 61 (SR 61) is a primary state highway in the U.S. state of Virginia. The state highway runs 48.16 miles (77.51 km) from SR 16 in Tazewell east to U.S. Route 460 (US 460) in Narrows. SR 61 passes through several narrow creek valleys as it parallels the West Virginia state line through Tazewell, Bland, and Giles counties. The only sizeable community between the highway's endpoints is Rocky Gap, where the highway meets US 52 and Interstate 77 (I-77).

== Route description ==
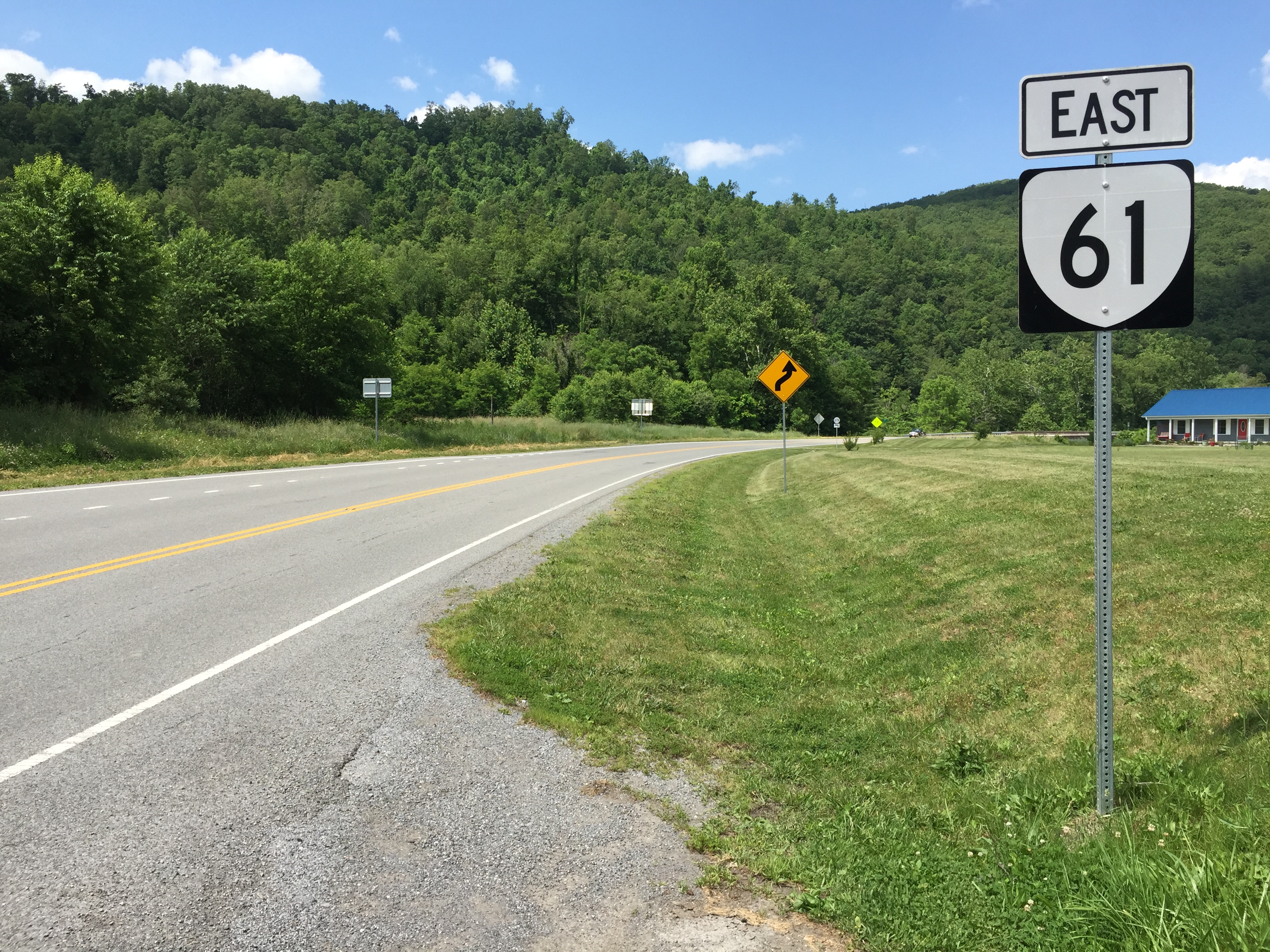
View east along SR 61 at US 52 in Rocky Gap

SR 61 begins at an intersection with SR 16 in the North Tazewell neighborhood of the town of Tazewell. SR 16 continues west along Riverside Drive and south as Tazewell Avenue, which heads into the downtown area. SR 61 parallels the Clinch River east through a four-ramp partial cloverleaf interchange with US 19 and US 460 to the neighborhood of Fourway. There, SR 61 turns south, meets a Norfolk Southern Railway rail line at grade, and crosses the North Folk Clinch River. Just south of the river, just east of the confluence of the North and South forks to form the main river, the state highway intersects US 19 Business and US 460 Business (Fincastle Turnpike).

SR 61 leaves the town of Tazewell and curves to the east to follow the South Fork Clinch River through the Clinch Valley between Buckhorn Mountain to the north and Rich Mountain to the south. The state highway passes through the hamlet of Burtons Shop on its way to the source of the South Folk just west of the Tennessee Valley Divide in the community of Gratton, where the highway intersects SR 623 (Burkes Garden Road), which leads over Rich Mountain to Burkes Garden. SR 61 continues east along Clear Fork through the community of Shawver Mill and enters Bland County. The state highway continues east as Clear Fork Creek Road, which passes through Cove Creek, Stowersville, and Clear Creek on the way to Rocky Gap. SR 61 has a short concurrency with US 52 (Scenic Highway), during the road briefly expands to a four-lane divided highway through a diamond interchange with I-77. The two highways make a sharp turn north, then split in the center of the village where Clear Fork enters Wolf Creek.

SR 61 continues east as Wolf Creek Road through the valley of Wolf Creek between Buckhorn Mountain to the north and Wolf Creek Mountain to the south. The highway passes through Round Bottom then enters Giles County. SR 61 passes through the tiny communities of Day, Phlegar, First Ford, Boxley, Chapel, Penvir, and Shumate on their way to Narrows. The state highway enters the town as Park Drive, crosses Wolf Creek, and continues as Monroe Street. North of its intersection with SR 100 (Main Street), SR 61 continues as McArthur Lane, which passes under a Norfolk Southern rail line and crosses over the New River and US 460 (Virginia Avenue). The state highway turns east onto Fleshman Street and turns south to reach its eastern terminus at an intersection with US 460.

== Major intersections ==
County	Location	mi	km	Destinations	Notes
Tazewell	Tazewell	0.00	0.00	SR 16 (Tazewell Avenue / West Riverside Drive) – Bishop	Western terminus
Tazewell	Tazewell	0.86	1.38	US 19 / US 460 – Bluefield, Claypool Hill	Interchange; exit 3 (US 19 / US 460)
Tazewell	Tazewell	2.15	3.46	US 19 Bus. / US 460 Bus. (Fincastle Turnpike)	
Tazewell	Gratton			SR 623 (Burkes Garden Road) – Burkes Garden	former SR 78 south
Bland		26.55	42.73	US 52 south (North Scenic Highway)	Western end of US 52 concurrency
Bland		26.61	42.82	I-77 – Bluefield, Wytheville	Exit 64 (I-77)
Bland	Rocky Gap	27.01	43.47	US 52 north (North Scenic Highway) – Bluefield	Eastern end of US 52 concurrency
Giles	Narrows	47.60	76.60	SR 100 south (Main Street)	Northern terminus of SR 100
Giles	Narrows	48.16	77.51	US 460 (Virginia Avenue) – Roanoke, Bluefield, WV	Eastern terminus
1.000 mi = 1.609 km; 1.000 km = 0.621 mi: Concurrency terminus

< SR 126	District 1 State Routes; 1928–1933	SR 128 >
< SR 136	District 1 State Routes; 1928–1933	SR 138 >
