= Cove Creek, Virginia =

- Unincorporated community
- Location within Virginia Location within the United States
- Coordinates: 37°10′41″N 81°17′36″W
- Country: United States
- State: Virginia
- County: Tazewell
- Elevation: 2,349 ft (716 m)
- Time zone: UTC-5 (Eastern (EST))
  - Summer (DST): UTC-4 (EDT)
- Area code: 276
- GNIS feature ID: 1492811

Cove Creek is an unincorporated community in Tazewell County, Virginia, United States. The community is located on Virginia State Route 61, 11.5 miles (18.5 km) east-northeast of Tazewell.
