= Virginia State Route 104 =

The following highways in Virginia have been known as State Route 104:

- Virginia State Route 104 (1923-1928), Drakes Branch, Virginia to Mount Rush, Virginia
- Virginia State Route 104 (1928-1933), now part of U.S. Route 421
- Virginia State Route 104 (1933-1949), now State Route 773 (Patrick County)
- Virginia State Route 104 (pre-2001), mid-1960s - 2001, now part of U.S. Route 17
