= Woodway =

Woodway may refer to:

- Woodway, Virginia
- Woodway, Washington
- Woodway, Texas
