= VA113 =

VA-113 has the following meanings:

- Attack Squadron 113 (U.S. Navy)
- State Route 113 (Virginia)
