= 4-way =

4-way or Fourway can refer to:

- an acoustic system containing four loudspeakers
- a formation skydiving event, "4-way sequential", that has four members in each team
- a Symmetric multiprocessing system with 4 processors
- Fourway Athletics, a Hong Kong football team
- Four-slide
- Four-way switch
- 4-way stop
- Fourway, Virginia (disambiguation)
