= Interstate 381 and Virginia State Route 381 =

Highway in Virginia

Interstate 381 and State Route 381
- Commonwealth Avenue
- I-381 highlighted in red; SR 381 highlighted in purple

Route information
- Maintained by VDOT
- Length: 2.88 mi (4.63 km) I-381: 1.67 mi (2.69 km); SR 381: 1.21 mi (1.95 km)
- Existed: 1960–present
- History: I-381 designated in 1961

Major junctions
- South end: US 11E / US 19 / US 421 / SR 1 at the Tennessee state line
- North end: I-81 / US 58 in Bristol

Location
- Country: United States
- State: Virginia
- Independent cities: Bristol

Highway system
- Interstate Highway System; Main; Auxiliary; Suffixed; Business; Future; Virginia Routes; Interstate; US; Primary; Secondary; Byways; History; HOT lanes
| ← SR 380 | → SR 382 |

State Route 381 (SR 381) is a primary state highway in the US state of Virginia. Known as Commonwealth Avenue, the state highway runs 1.21 miles (1.95 km) from the Tennessee state line north to the 1.67-mile (2.69 km) Interstate 381 (I-381) within the independent city of Bristol. In conjunction with I-381, SR 381 connects I-81 with downtown Bristol. The state highway also connects the Interstate Highways with US Route 11 (US 11), US 11W, US 11E, US 19, and US 421; SR 381 runs concurrently with the latter three highways between downtown Bristol and US 11. I-381 is a spur from I-81 that provides access to Bristol. It runs for 1.67 miles (2.69 km) from the intersection of Commonwealth Avenue (SR 381) and Keys/Church streets in Bristol at exit 0 north to I-81. The I-81 interchange, the only one on I-381, is signed as exit 1A (I-81 north) and exit 1B (I-81 south).

== Route description ==
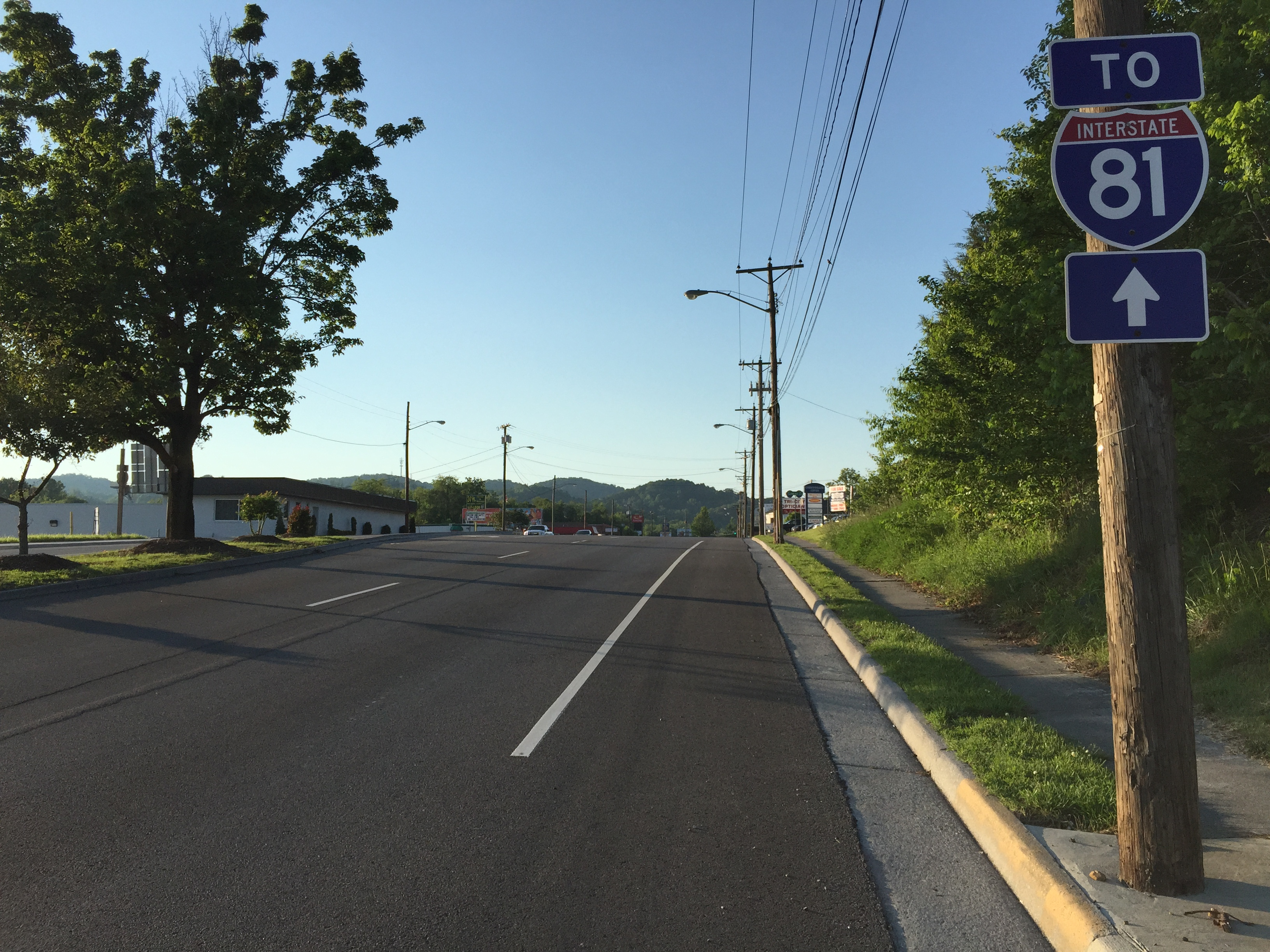
View north along SR 381 at US 11/US 11E/US 11W/US 19/US 421 in Bristol

SR 381 begins at the Tennessee state line at State Street, which follows the Virginia–Tennessee state line as the main street of Bristol, Virginia, to the north and Bristol, Tennessee, to the south and forms the easternmost part of Tennessee State Route 1 west of the intersection. The roadway continues south as US 11E and US 19 following Volunteer Parkway, a major arterial through Bristol, Tennessee, that leads toward Johnson City. SR 381 and the two US Routes head north along Commonwealth Avenue, a four-lane divided highway that intersects Goode Street one block north of the state line; Goode Street carries US 421 and both US 11 Truck and US 19 Truck through the Bristol Commercial Historic District. SR 381, US 11E, US 19, and US 421 meet the southern end of SR 113 at separate intersections: Cumberland Street carries northbound SR 113 east and Sycamore Street carries the westbound direction. The four highways continue north to east–west Euclid Avenue, where US 11E has its northern terminus. Westbound Euclid Avenue heads west carrying northbound US 421 and southbound US 11W toward Kingsport and Gate City. US 19 turns east to join US 11 on eastbound Euclid Avenue. SR 381 continues north along Commonwealth Avenue, paralleling a railroad line through an industrial area to its northern terminus at an intersection with Keys Street.

The roadway continues north as I-381, which connects downtown Bristol with I-81, the route to Roanoke and Knoxville. I-381 runs for 1.67 miles (2.69 km) from the intersection of Commonwealth Avenue (SR 381) and Keys/Church streets in Bristol at exit 0 north to I-81. The I-81 interchange, the only one on I-381, is signed as exit 1A (I-81 north) and exit 1B (I-81 south).

== History ==
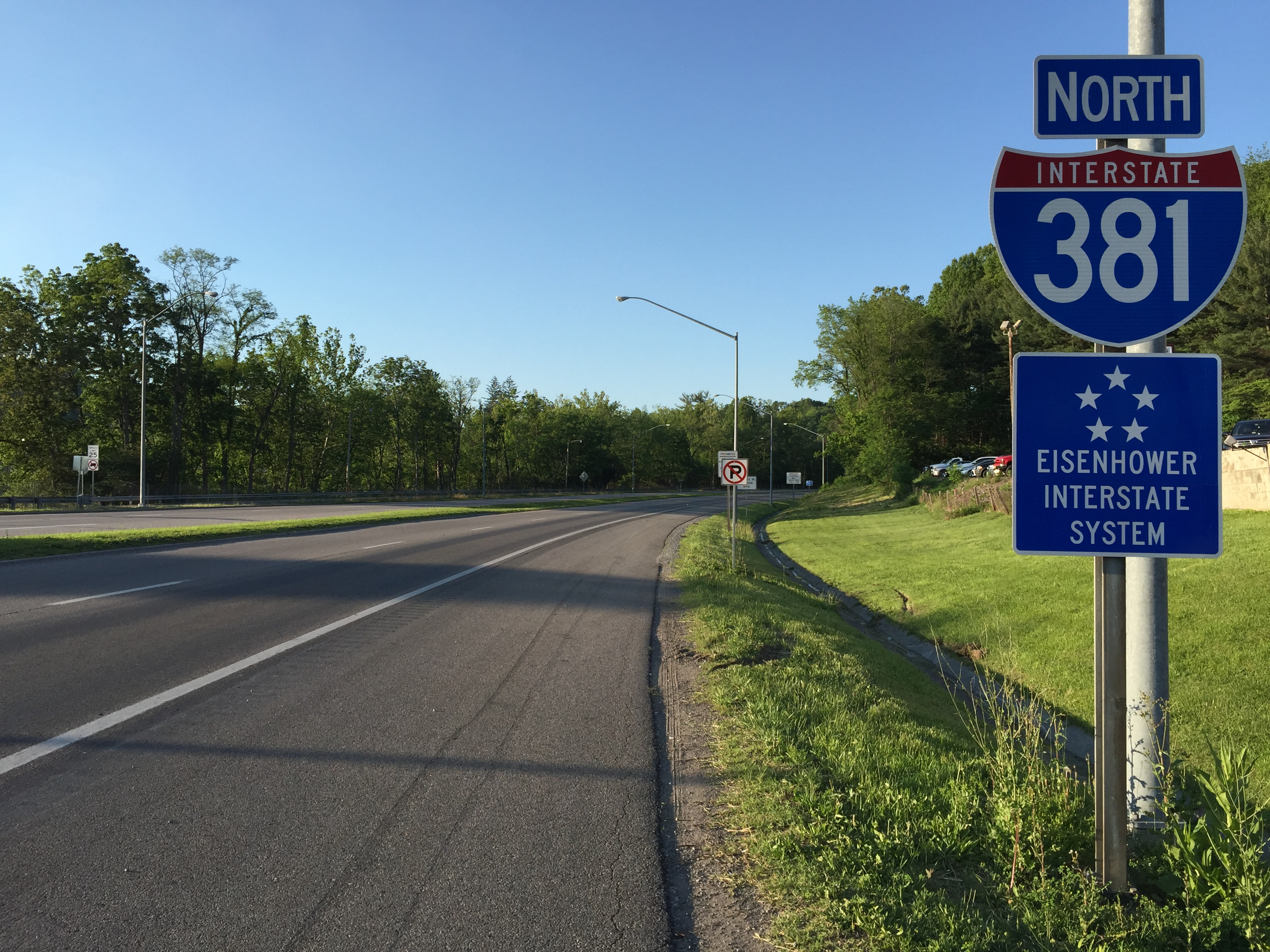
View north at the south end of I-381 at Church Street in Bristol

The I-381 freeway originally opened to traffic on November 20, 1961, the same time as the part of I-81 that bypasses Bristol to the north.

In its original configuration, the interchange between I-81 and I-381 was a single Y interchange, providing access from southbound I-81 to southbound I-381 (via a left exit) and northbound I-381 to northbound I-81. By 1989, ramps were added to make it a full directional T interchange. In 1996, southbound I-81 was moved next to the northbound side, turning the southbound left exit and entrance into right-side ramps.

== Junction list ==
The entire route is in Bristol.

| mi | km | Exit | Destinations | Notes |
|---|---|---|---|---|
| 0.00 | 0.00 | | US 11E / US 19 / US 421 south (Volunteer Parkway) | Continuation into Tennessee; southern end of US 11E/US 19/US 421 concurrency |
| 0.07 | 0.11 | | US 11 Truck / US 19 Truck (Goode Street) | Southern end of US 11 Truck/US 19 Truck concurrency |
| 0.23 | 0.37 | | Cumberland Street (SR 113 north) | |
| 0.58 | 0.93 | | US 11 / US 19 north (Euclid Avenue east) / US 11W / US 421 (Euclid Avenue west) to I-81 south US 11 Truck / US 19 Truck ends | Northern end of US 11E/US 19/US 421/US 11 Truck/US 19 Truck concurrency; US 11E and US 11W merge into US 11 north |
| 1.21 | 1.95 | Southern end of freeway section SR 381 becomes I-381 | | |
| 2.91 | 4.68 | 1 | I-81 (US 58) – Kingsport, Knoxville, Roanoke | Northern terminus of I-381; signed as exits 1A (north) and 1B (south); exit 3 on I-81; tri-stack interchange |
1.000 mi = 1.609 km; 1.000 km = 0.621 mi: Concurrency terminus; Route transition
