= Fourway, Virginia =

Fourway, Virginia may refer to:

- Fourway, Rappahannock County, Virginia
- Fourway, Tazewell County, Virginia
