= U.S. Route 19 in Virginia =

State highway in Virginia

U.S. Route 19
- US 19 highlighted in red

Route information
- Maintained by VDOT
- Length: 88.89 mi (143.05 km)
- Existed: late 1920s–present
- Tourist routes: Virginia Byway

Major junctions
- South end: US 19 / US 11E / US 421 / SR 1 in Bristol
- US 11W / US 421 / SR 381 in Bristol; I-81 / US 58 in Bristol; US 11 in Abingdon; US 58 Alt. in Hansonville; SR 80 in Rosedale; US 460 in Claypool Hill; SR 16 in Tazewell; SR 61 in Tazewell; SR 102 in Bluefield
- North end: US 19 in Bluefield

Location
- Country: United States
- State: Virginia
- Counties: City of Bristol, Washington, Russell, Tazewell

Highway system
- United States Numbered Highway System; List; Special; Divided; Virginia Routes; Interstate; US; Primary; Secondary; Byways; History; HOT lanes
← SR 18	→ SR 20

U.S. Route 19 (US 19) is a part of the United States Numbered Highway System that runs from Memphis, Florida, to Erie, Pennsylvania. In Virginia, the highway runs 88.89 miles (143.05 km) between two pairs of twin cities: Bristol, Tennessee, and Bristol, Virginia, at the Virginia–Tennessee state line, and Bluefield, Virginia, and Bluefield, West Virginia, at the Virginia–West Virginia state line. Between its endpoints, US 19 has lengthy concurrencies with US 11, US 58 Alternate (US 58 Alt.), and US 460 during its course connecting Abingdon, Lebanon, and Tazewell within Washington, Russell, and Tazewell counties in Southwest Virginia.

== Route description ==
=== Bristol to Abingdon ===
US 19 enters Virginia concurrent with US 11E at State Street, which follows the Virginia–Tennessee state line as the main street of Bristol, Virginia, to the north and Bristol, Tennessee, to the south and forms the easternmost part of State Route 1 (SR 1) west of the intersection. The two U.S. Highways and SR 381 head north along Commonwealth Avenue, a four-lane divided highway that intersects Goode Street one block north of the state line; Goode Street carries US 421 and both US 11 Truck and US 19 Truck through the Bristol Commercial Historic District. US 19, US 11E, US 421, and SR 381 meet the southern end of SR 113 at separate intersections: Cumberland Street carries northbound SR 113 east and Sycamore Street carries the westbound direction. The four highways continue north to east–west Euclid Avenue, where US 11E has its northern terminus. SR 381 continues north along Commonwealth Avenue to the southern end of Interstate 381 (I-381), a spur south from I-81. Westbound Euclid Avenue heads west carrying northbound US 421 and southbound US 11W. US 19 turns east to join US 11 on eastbound Euclid Avenue.

US 19 and US 11 head east as a two-lane divided boulevard through a residential area. The street becomes undivided shortly before the U.S. Highways reach the northern end of SR 113 (Moore Street), which heads south toward Virginia Intermont College and downtown Bristol. US 19 and US 11 continue northeast on Lee Highway, which here and in much of Virginia is a three-lane road with a center left-turn lane. The highway meets I-81 and US 58 at a diamond interchange with a rakish angle. US 19 and US 11 pass under Norfolk Southern Railway's Pulaski District and cross Beaver Creek before leaving the city of Bristol. The two highways continue northeast through Washington County, where they pass Virginia Highlands Airport before entering the town of Abingdon. At the west end of town, US 19 and US 11 intersect SR 140 (Jonesboro Road), a connector between the U.S. Highways and I-81 that also serves Virginia Highlands Community College. The U.S. Highways continue east as Main Street, which passes under the Norfolk Southern Railway line before US 19 turns north onto Porterfield Highway.

=== Abingdon to Bluefield ===
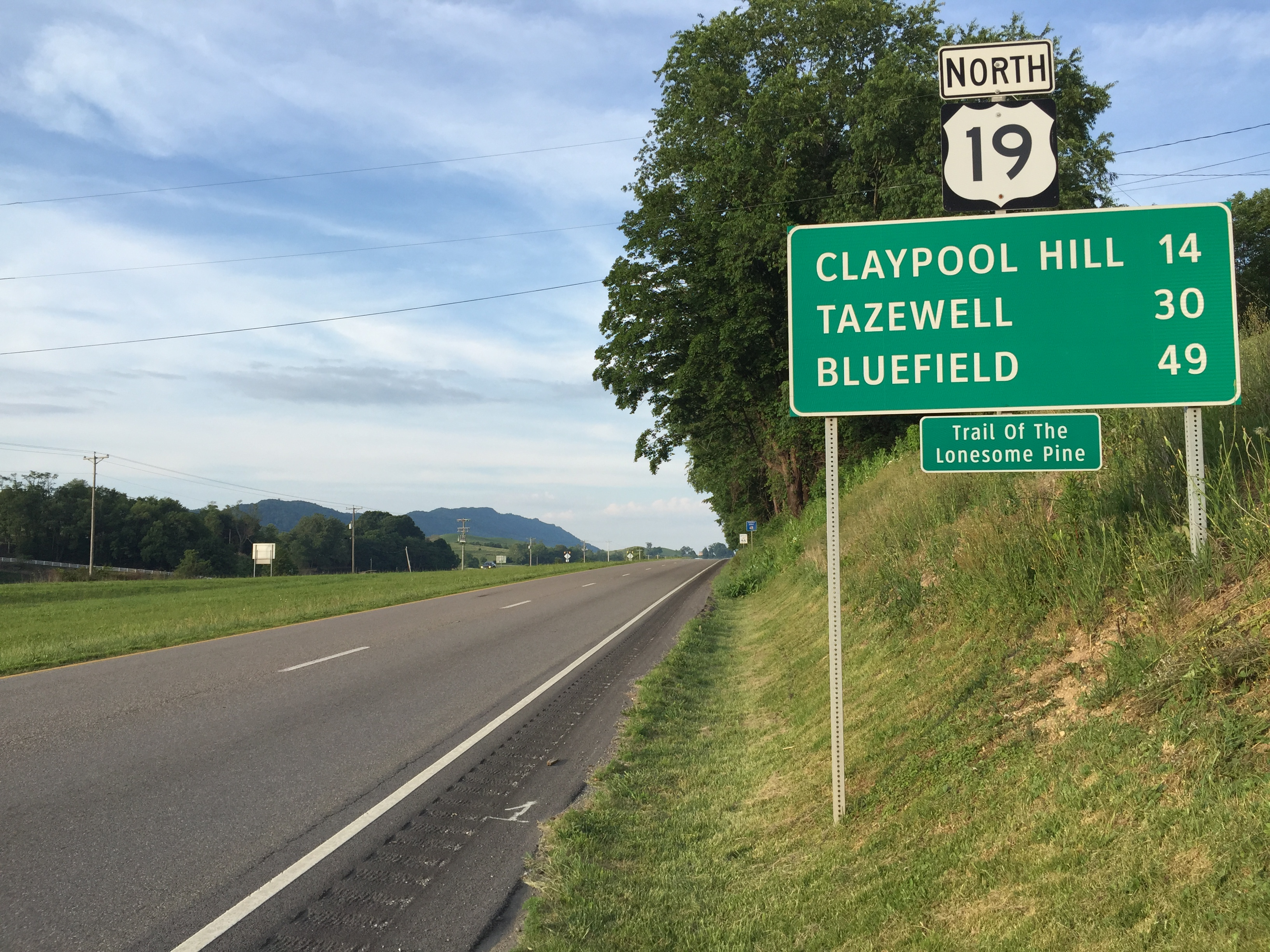
View north along US 19 at SR 80 in Rosedale

US 19 heads northwest as a four-lane divided highway that is joined by US 58 Alt. (Russell Road) before leaving the town of Abingdon. The two highways cross Walker Mountain and briefly follow the North Fork Holston River before following Moccasin Creek through Moccasin Gap between Clinch Mountain to the west and Brumley Mountain to the east. US 19 and US 58 Alt. enter Russell County at Little Moccasin Gap a short distance east of where the highways diverge at Hansonville. US 19 continues northeast by the village of Willis before reaching Lebanon. At the southwest corner of the town, the U.S. Highway has a diamond interchange with US 19 Business (US 19 Bus.; Main Street) and SR 660 (Mountain Road). US 19 has a diamond interchange with SR 654 before meeting the eastern end of US 19 Bus. (Trail of the Lonesome Pine) east of Big Cedar Creek.

US 19 continues northeast as the Trail of the Lonesome Pine, which has an intersection with SR 80 (Hayters Gap Road) at the hamlet of Smithfield. The two highways run concurrently to Rosedale, where SR 80 heads north as Red Bud Highway. At Southwest Virginia Community College at the Russell–Tazewell county line, US 19 veers north through Wardell and crosses the Little River. The U.S. Highway curves east again and meets US 460 (Governor George C. Peery Highway) at Claypool Hill. US 19 and US 460 parallel the Clinch River and Norfolk Southern Railway's Clinch Valley District through Pounding Mill and Cliffield to the hamlet of Pisgah, where US 19 Bus. and US 460 Bus. head south as Crab Orchard Road toward Frog Level.

US 19 and US 460 become a freeway through the town of Tazewell that has diamond interchanges with SR 16 Alt. (Fairground Road) and SR 16 (Tazewell Avenue). The freeway crosses the railroad and the Clinch River at its partial cloverleaf interchange with SR 61 (Riverside Drive). North of Tazewell, US 19 and US 460 have a partial cloverleaf interchange with SR 645 (Cauitts Creek Road) and SR 678 (Market Street) before meeting the eastern end of the U.S. Highways' business routes, named Fincastle Turnpike, at a partial interchange where the highways cross over the Clinch Valley rail line. US 19 and US 460 diverge as the local and express routes, respectively, through the twin towns of Bluefield, Virginia, and Bluefield, West Virginia. US 19 heads northeast from its trumpet interchange with US 460 and crosses the rail line into the town of Bluefield, where the highway reduces to a two-lane undivided road and follows Virginia Avenue. After closely paralleling the rail line, at Greever Avenue, the U.S. Highway makes a right-angle turn north to continue on Virginia Avenue, then veers east, passing under the rail line at its junction with the Pocahontas District rail line. US 19 has a pair of right-angle turns at its crossing of Beaverpond Creek just west of its intersection with SR 102 (College Avenue). The U.S. Highway passes through downtown Bluefield, Virginia, before crossing the state line into Bluefield, West Virginia, where the highway continues as Bluefield Avenue.

== History ==
What is now US 19 was part of the original 1918 state highway system. It was part of SR 10 from Bristol to Abingdon, a spur of SR 10 (designated SR 106 in the 1923 renumbering and SR 110 in the 1928 renumbering) from Abingdon to Hansonville, another spur of SR 10 from Hansonville to Lebanon, and SR 11 from Lebanon to Bluefield. The spur from Hansonville to Lebanon was initially designated State Route 10Y (SR 10Y). In the 1923 renumbering, it was renumbered State Route 112 (SR 112, as a spur of SR 11), and, in the 1928 renumbering, it became State Route 131 (SR 131). US 19 was added in the late 1920s, and, in the 1933 renumbering, the state routes were dropped.

== Major intersections ==
County	Location	mi	km	Exit	Destinations	Notes
City of Bristol		0.00	0.00		US 11E south / US 19 south / US 421 south (Volunteer Parkway / SR 1 east) / West State Street (SR 1 west)	Tennessee state line; south end of US 11E / US 421 / SR 381 overlap
City of Bristol		0.08	0.13		US 11 Truck north (Goode Street) / US 19 Truck north	South end of US 11 Truck overlap
City of Bristol		0.23	0.37		Cumberland Street (SR 113 north)	
City of Bristol		0.58	0.93		US 11W south / US 421 north (Euclid Avenue) to Commonwealth Avenue (SR 381 north) / I-81	north end of US 11E / US 421 / US 11 Truck / SR 381 overlap; south end of US 11 overlap
see US 11 (mile 0.0-13.4)
Washington	Abingdon	13.99	22.51		US 11 north (West Main Street) – Business District	Northern end of US 11 concurrency
Washington	Abingdon	14.44	23.24		US 58 Alt. east (Russell Road) – Abingdon	Southern end of US 58 Alt. concurrency
Washington	Holston				SR 802 (Mendota Road) – Mendota	former SR 42 west
Russell	Hansonville	26.70	42.97		US 58 Alt. west (Norton)	Northern end of US 58 Alt. concurrency
Russell	Lebanon	32.33	52.03	1	US 19 Bus. north / SR 660 – Lebanon	interchange
Russell	Lebanon	34.39	55.35	2	SR 654 to US 19 Bus. – Lebanon	interchange
Russell		36.04	58.00		US 19 Bus. south (Main Street) – Lebanon	Northern terminus of US 19 Bus.
Russell	Smithfield	40.80	65.66		SR 80 east (Hayters Gap Road) – Meadowview	Southern end of SR 80 concurrency
Russell	Rosedale	43.37	69.80		SR 80 west (Redbud Highway) – Honaker, Breaks Interstate Park	Northern end of SR 80 concurrency
Tazewell	Claypool Hill	56.90	91.57		US 460 west (Governor G.C. Peery Highway) – Richlands, Pikeville, Cedar Bluff, Grundy, Breaks Interstate Park, Tazewell County Airport	Southern end of US 460 concurrency
Tazewell	see US 460 (mile 47.00-74.47)					
Tazewell	Bluefield	84.37	135.78		US 460 east to I-77 – Princeton	interchange; north end of US 460 overlap; US 19 north follows exit 1
Tazewell	Bluefield	88.09	141.77		SR 102 (College Avenue)	
Tazewell	Bluefield	88.89	143.05		US 19 north (Bluefield Avenue) – Bluefield	West Virginia state line
1.000 mi = 1.609 km; 1.000 km = 0.621 mi: Concurrency terminus

== See also ==
U.S. Route 19
Previous state: Tennessee	Virginia	Next state: West Virginia

< SR 111	Spurs of SR 11; 1923–1928	SR 113 >
< SR 130	District 1 State Routes; 1928–1933	SR 132 >
