= Virginia State Route 158 =

State highway in Wise County, Virginia, US

State Route 158

Route information
- Maintained by VDOT
- Length: 2.52 mi (4.06 km)
- Existed: 1999–present

Major junctions
- West end: US 58 Alt. in Coeburn
- SR 72 in Coeburn
- East end: US 58 Alt. near Coeburn

Location
- Country: United States
- State: Virginia
- Counties: Wise

Highway system
- Virginia Routes; Interstate; US; Primary; Secondary; Byways; History; HOT lanes
← SR 157	→ SR 159

State Route 158 (SR 158) is a primary state highway in the U.S. state of Virginia. Known for most of its length as Front Street, the state highway runs 2.52 miles (4.06 km) from U.S. Route 58 Alternate (US 58 Alternate) in Coeburn east to US 58 Alternate east of Coeburn. SR 158 comprises much of the old alignment of US 58 Alternate through Coeburn in eastern Wise County.

== Route description ==
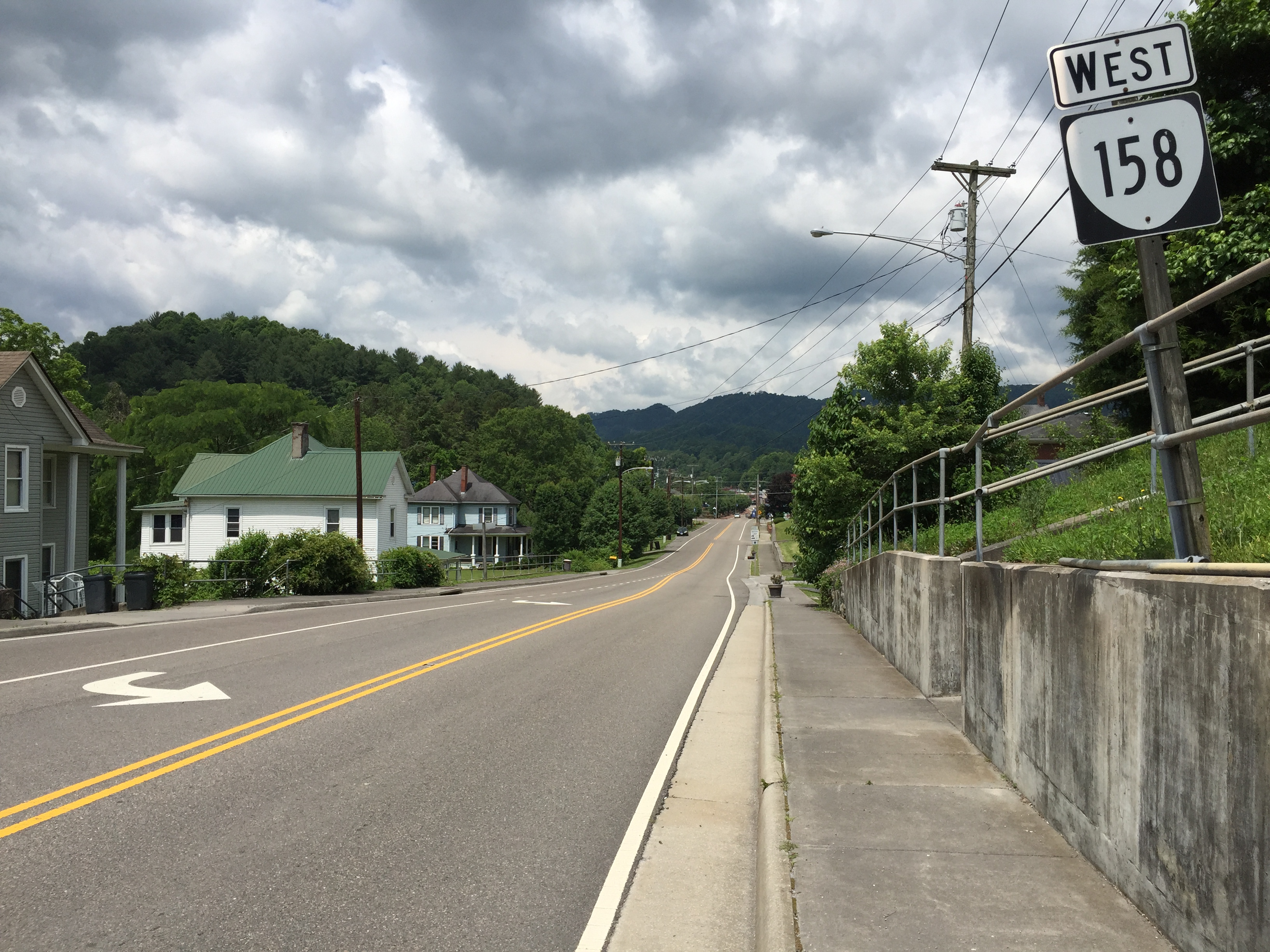
View west along SR 158 in Coeburn

SR 158 begins at a right-in/right-out interchange with westbound US 58 Alternate (Norton Coeburn Road) in the town of Coeburn. The state highway heads east as Front Street to its intersection with SR 72 (Laurel Avenue) and SR 813 (2nd Street); the latter street connects SR 158 and eastbound US 58 Alternate. SR 158 and SR 72 run concurrently through a grade crossing of a rail spur from Norfolk Southern Railway's Clinch Valley District and enter downtown Coeburn. East of downtown, SR 72 turns south onto Dungannon Road. SR 158 parallels the Clinch Valley rail line east to the east town limit of Coeburn, where the highway becomes Bull Run Road. At SR 893 (Bull Run Road), SR 158 turns south, crosses the rail line, and reaches its eastern terminus at an intersection with US 58 Alternate (Bull Run Road).

== Major intersections ==
The entire route is in Wise County.

Location	mi	km	Destinations	Notes
Coeburn	0.00	0.00	US 58 Alt. / SR 813 (Old Norton Coeburn Road) to SR 72 south	interchange; US 58 Alt. exit 1; western terminus
Coeburn	0.33	0.53	SR 72 north (Laurel Avenue)	West end of concurrency with SR 72
Coeburn	0.98	1.58	SR 72 south (Dungannon Road) to US 58 Alt. – St. Paul	East end of concurrency with SR 72
			SR 893 (Bull Run Drive) – Banner	
	2.52	4.06	US 58 Alt.	Eastern terminus
1.000 mi = 1.609 km; 1.000 km = 0.621 mi: Concurrency terminus
