= Burke's Garden Central Church and Cemetery =

Historic church in Virginia, United States

- U.S. National Register of Historic Places
- U.S. Historic district
- Virginia Landmarks Register
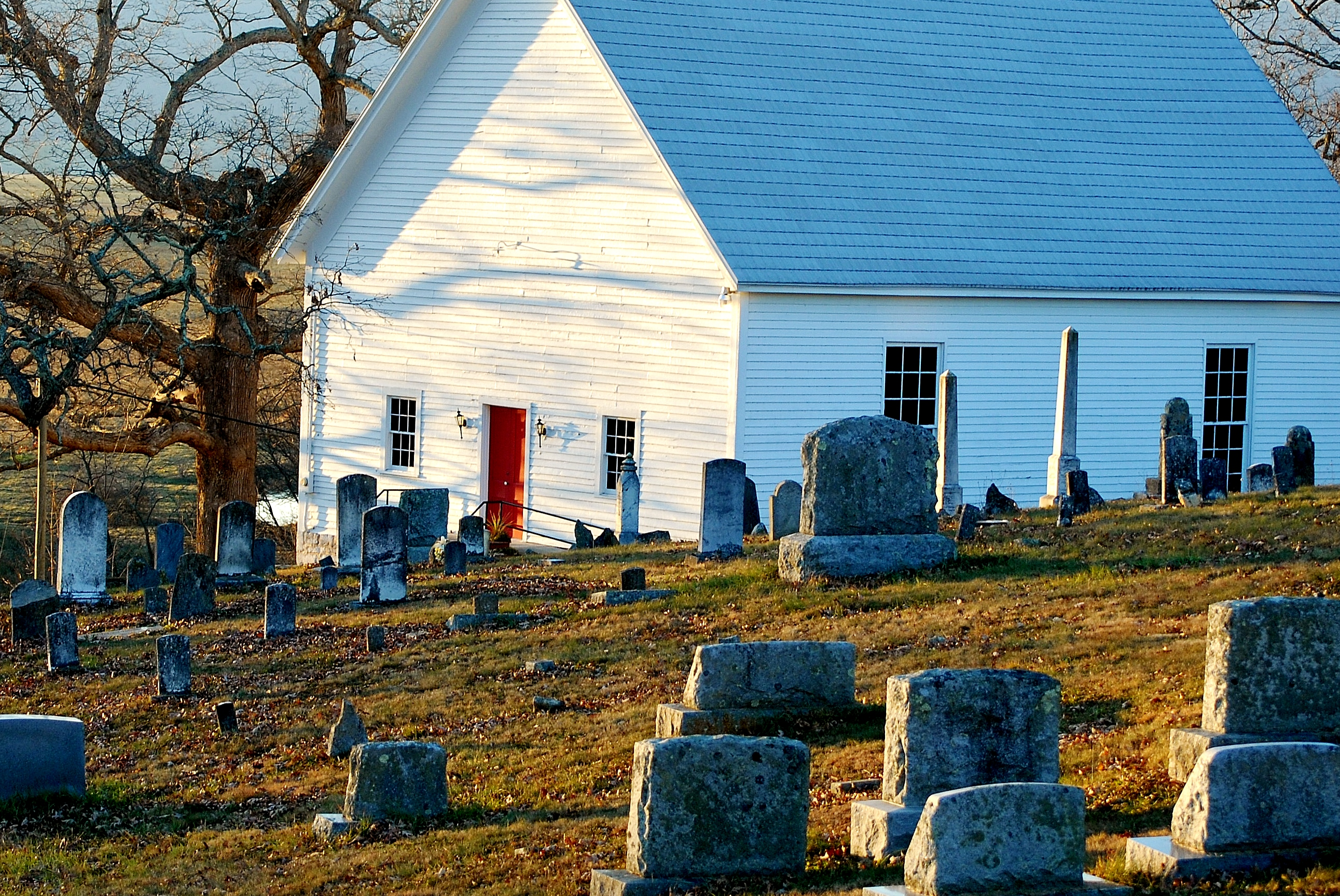

- Location within Virginia Location within the United States
- Nearest city: Burke's Garden, Virginia
- Coordinates: 37°5′32″N 81°20′7″W
- Area: 2.5 acres (1.0 ha)
- Built: 1827, 1875
- Architect: Multiple
- NRHP reference No.: 79003092
- VLR No.: 092-0014

Significant dates
- Added to NRHP: May 07, 1979
- Designated VLR: November 21, 1978

Burkes Garden Central Lutheran Church, listed as Burkes Garden Central Church and Cemetery, is a historic Lutheran church, cemetery, and national historic district located at Burke's Garden, Tazewell County, Virginia. The church was built in 1875, and is a plain rectangular frame building, two bays long, with a steep gable roof. It originally served multiple denominations as a union church but has exclusively served the Lutheran denomination in modern times.

The community was an outpost of German immigrants who settled in the backcountry frontier in the late 18th century. The cemetery was founded in 1827, and contains a notable collection of sandstone Germanic gravestones.

It was listed on the National Register of Historic Places in 1979.
