= U.S. Route 58 Alternate =

Alternate highway route in Virginia, United States

U.S. Route 58 Alternate

Route information
- Maintained by VDOT
- Length: 87.40 mi (140.66 km)
- Existed: c. 1950–present
- Tourist routes: Virginia Byway

Major junctions
- West end: US 58 in Jonesville
- US 421 in Pennington Gap; US 23 in Norton; SR 72 in Coeburn; SR 63 in St. Paul; SR 65 at Banners Corner; SR 71 in Dickensonville; US 19 in Hansonville; US 11 in Abingdon
- East end: I-81 / US 58 / SR 75 in Abingdon

Location
- Country: United States
- State: Virginia
- Counties: Lee, Wise, City of Norton, Russell, Washington,

Highway system
- United States Numbered Highway System; List; Special; Divided; Virginia Routes; Interstate; US; Primary; Secondary; Byways; History; HOT lanes
← US 58	→ SR 59

U.S. Route 58 Alternate (US 58 Alt.) is an 87.40-mile-long (140.66 km) alternate route to US 58 in western Virginia. The route is a northern bypass to US 58 which stays closer to the Tennessee border and serves Gate City and Bristol.

== Route description ==
=== Jonesville to Norton ===
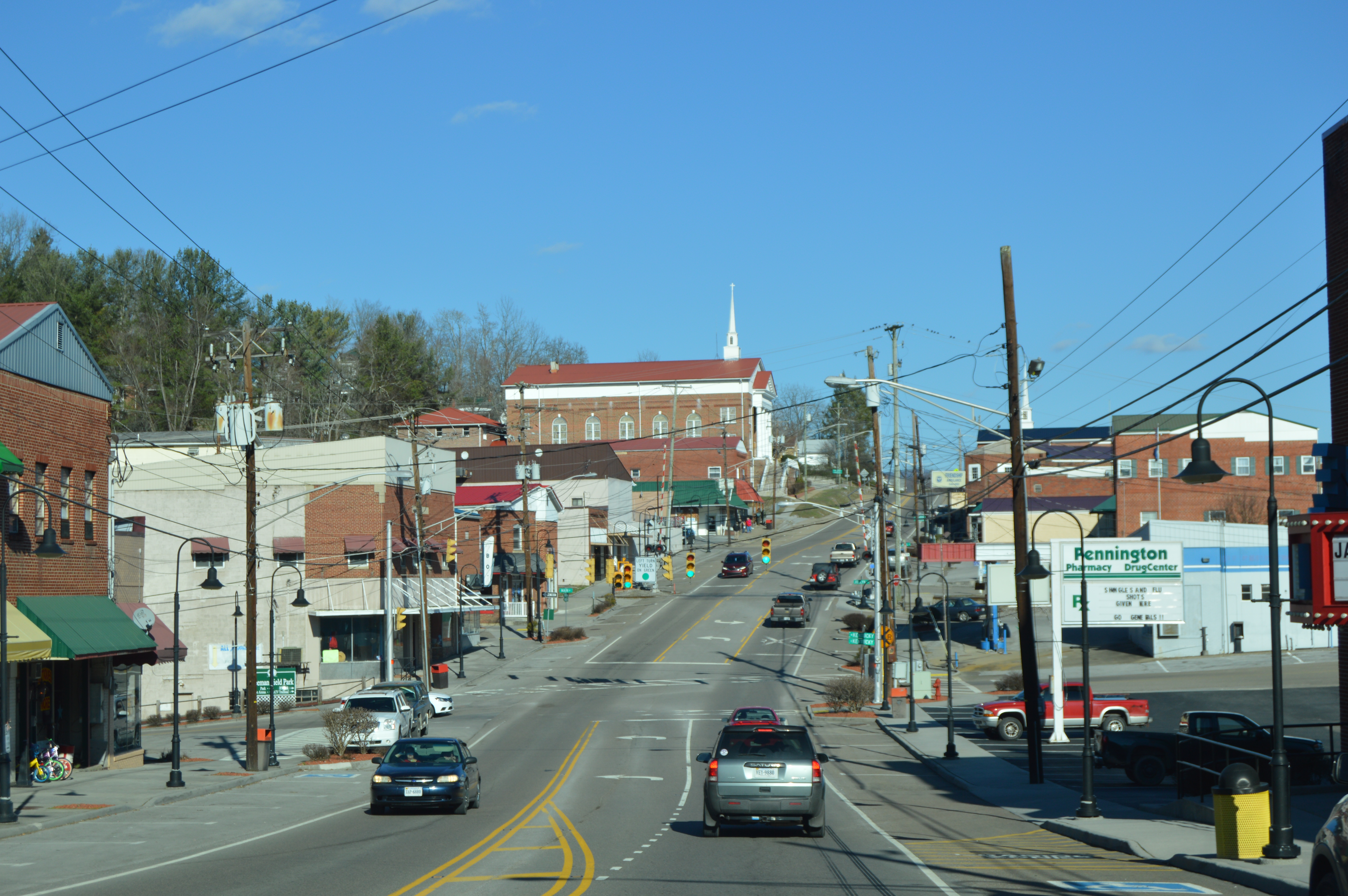
US 58 Alt. in Downtown Pennington Gap

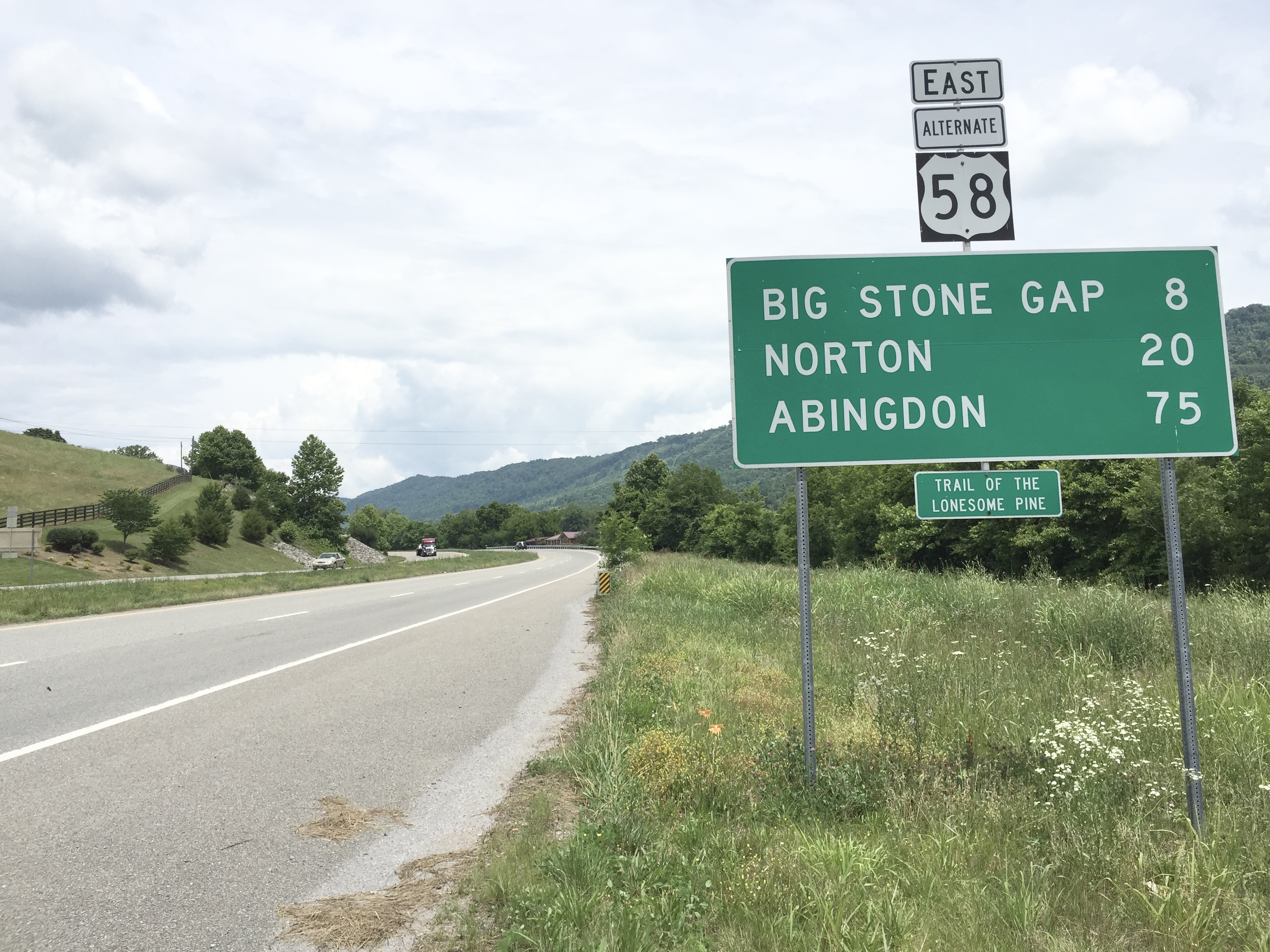
View east along US 58 Alt. in eastern Lee County

US 58 Alt. begins at the intersection of Main Street and Park Street in the center of the town of Jonesville, the county seat of Lee County. US 58 heads west along Main Street and south along Park Street, then east along Wilderness Road. US 58 Alt. heads east along two-lane Main Street, then north along the Trail of the Lonesome Pine to exit the town. The highway expands to a four-lane divided highway north of the town limits, then curves east. US 58 Alt. temporarily becomes undivided through Ben Hur, where the highway begins to parallel CSX's Cumberland Valley Subdivision rail line. The highway drops to two lanes and crosses over the rail line as it enters the town of Pennington Gap. US 58 Alt. follows Morgan Avenue through the town, where it briefly runs concurrently with US 421 between Doris Avenue and Woodway Road.

US 58 Alt. expands to a four-lane divided highway again as it exits Pennington Gap. The highway crosses over the railroad again at the west end of Dryden and leaves the railroad as the U.S. Highway crosses the Powell River. US 58 Alt. returns to the vicinity of the river and railroad and enters Wise County, where its name becomes Pennington Gap Highway, just west of Big Stone Gap. The highway reduces to two lanes and enters the town as Cumberland Avenue, then veers onto Wood Avenue, which passes the Southwest Virginia Museum. In the center of town, US 58 Alt. turns south onto Fifth Street, which carries U.S. Route 23 Business (US 23 Bus.). The U.S. Highway special routes turn east onto Gilley Avenue to leave the town. The road expands to a four-lane divided highway shortly before a four-ramp partial cloverleaf interchange with US 23 (Orby Cantrell Highway) north of the campus of Mountain Empire Community College. US 23 Bus. ends at the interchange while US 58 Alt. joins the US 23 divided highway.

US 58 Alt. and US 23 cross over Norfolk Southern Railway's Appalachia District rail line, have a diamond interchange with SR 610 (Powell Valley Road), then follow the southern flank of Little Stone Mountain. The highway veers north to cross the mountain at Little Stone Gap, then curves back east again and enters the independent city of Norton. The highways have a four-ramp partial cloverleaf interchange with 12th Street, which forms part of US 58 Alt. Bus., while bypassing downtown Norton to the south. US 58 Alt. and US 23 cross over SR 74, Norfolk Southern's Clinch Valley District rail line, and the Guest River before reaching the partial cloverleaf interchange where the highways diverge. US 23 continues north toward Wise and US 58 Alt. exits onto Norton Coeburn Road; the portion of that road west of the interchange is the eastern end of US 58 Alt. Bus., which is also SR 283 at its eastern end.

=== Norton to Abingdon ===
US 58 Alt. heads east along four-lane divided Norton Coeburn Road. The highway leaves the city of Norton and re-enters Wise County at its junction with SR 74 (Kentucky Avenue). US 58 Alt. parallels the rail line and the Guest River through the community of Tacoma on its way to the town of Coeburn, where the highway diverges from the river. At the west end of town, the highway has a westbound right-in/right-out interchange with SR 158 (Front Street) and an eastbound interchange with Trail of the Lonesome Pine, which leads to SR 158. Further east, US 58 Alt. has a diamond interchange with SR 72. The highway meets the eastern end of SR 158 at Banner, then continues southeast as Bull Run Road toward the town of St. Paul. Within the town, US 58 Alt. passes under the Clinch Valley District rail line and briefly cuts through a strip of Russell County, within which the highway intersects SR 63 (Wise Street). The alternate route returns to Wise County as Castlewood Drive, crosses over CSX's Kingsport Subdivision, and meets the southern end of SR 270 (Fourth Street). US 58 Alt. then crosses the Clinch River into Russell County and leaves the town of St. Paul.

US 58 Alt. continues as Trail of the Lonesome Pine along the south and west side of the unincorporated community of Castlewood and meets the northern end of SR 65 at Banners Corner. The alternate route runs concurrently with SR 71 between the hamlets of Parsonage and Dickensonville. US 58 Alt. heads south to the hamlet of Bolton, then turns east and meets US 19 at Hansonville. The two highways head southeast and cross Clinch Mountain at Little Moccasin Gap. US 58 Alt. and US 19 continue into Washington County as Porterfield Highway. US 58 Alt. and US 19 cross the North Fork of the Holston River at Holston and continue together to the town of Abingdon, where US 58 Alt. splits east onto two-lane Russell Road, which passes to the north of the William King Museum. In downtown Abingdon, US 58 Alt. briefly runs concurrently with US 11 east along Main Street, then turns south onto four-lane Cummings Street, which also carries SR 75. The highways cross over Norfolk Southern's Pulaski District rail line and head south a diamond interchange with I-81 and US 58 that serves as the eastern terminus of US 58 Alt. SR 75 continues south toward Green Spring.

== Major intersections ==
County	Location	mi	km	Old exit	New exit	Destinations	Notes
Lee	Jonesville	0.00	0.00			US 58 (Main Street / Wilderness Road) – Cumberland Gap, Gate City, Bristol	Western terminus
Lee	Pennington Gap	8.47	13.63			US 421 north – Harlan	West end of US 421 concurrency
Lee	Pennington Gap	8.87	14.27			US 421 south – Gate City, Bristol	East end of US 421 concurrency
Wise	Big Stone Gap	26.36	42.42			US 23 Bus. north (East 5th Street North) / SR 610 (Wood Avenue East) – Appalachia	West end of US 23 Bus. concurrency
Wise		27.88	44.87	1	33	US 23 south – Duffield, Kingsport	Partial cloverleaf interchange; US 23 Exit 33; east end of US 23 Bus. concurrency; west end of US 23 concurrency
Wise		29.19	46.98	2	35	SR 610 (Powell Valley Road) – Big Stone Gap	Diamond interchange
City of Norton		36.38	58.55	1	42	US 23 Bus. north / US 58 Alt. Bus. east (Kentucky Avenue) / SR 619 – Downtown Norton	Partial cloverleaf interchange
City of Norton		37.88	60.96	2	44	US 23 north / US 58 Alt. Bus. west (Norton Coeburn Road) to US 23 Bus. – Wise, Jenkins, KY, Airport	Partial cloverleaf interchange; US 23 Exit 44; east end of US 23 concurrency; eastern terminus of US 58 Alt. Bus. and unsigned SR 283
Wise						SR 74 west (Kentucky Avenue)	
Wise	Coeburn	48.89	78.68		1	SR 158 east to SR 72 north – Downtown Coeburn	Right-in/right-out interchange with SR 158 westbound; two-ramp interchange with Trail of the Lonesome Pine eastbound
Wise	Coeburn	48.89	78.68		2	SR 72 – Dungannon, Coeburn	Diamond interchange
Wise	Banner					SR 158 west – Banner	
Russell	St. Paul	57.76	92.96			SR 63 north (Wise Street) – Dante, Fremont, Breaks Interstate Park	
Wise	St. Paul					SR 270 north (Fourth Avenue) – Historic District	
Russell	Castlewood	60.80	97.85			SR 65 south – Dungannon	
Russell	Parsonage	64.94	104.51			SR 71 south – Gate City	West end of SR 71 concurrency
Russell	Dickensonville	66.40	106.86			SR 71 north – Lebanon	East end of SR 71 concurrency
Russell	Hansonville	73.11	117.66			US 19 north – Tazewell, Bluefield, Lebanon	West end of US 19 concurrency
Washington	Abingdon	85.37	137.39			US 19 south (Porterfield Highway) to I-81 – Bristol, Virginia Highlands Airport, Virginia Highlands Community College	East end of US 19 concurrency
Washington	Abingdon	86.38	139.02			US 11 south (Main Street) to US 19 south	West end of US 11 concurrency
Washington	Abingdon	86.62	139.40			US 11 north (Main Street) – Barter Theatre	East end of US 11 concurrency; west end of SR 75 concurrency
Washington	Abingdon	87.40	140.66			I-81 / US 58 / SR 75 south – Roanoke, Bristol	Eastern terminus; I-81 Exit 17; east end of SR 75 concurrency
1.000 mi = 1.609 km; 1.000 km = 0.621 mi: Concurrency terminus

== See also ==
- Special routes of U.S. Route 58
