= Hansonville, Virginia =

Unincorporated community in Virginia, US

Coordinates: 36°49′26″N 82°08′46″W

Hansonville is an unincorporated community in southern Russell County, Virginia, United States. It is located at the junction of US Route 58 Alternate and US Route 19.
