= Virginia State Route 74 =

State highway in western Virginia, US

State Route 74

Route information
- Maintained by VDOT
- Length: 2.42 mi (3.89 km)
- Existed: 1958–present

Major junctions
- West end: US 23 Bus. in Norton
- East end: US 58 Alt. / SR 681 near Norton

Location
- Country: United States
- State: Virginia
- Counties: City of Norton, Wise

Highway system
- Virginia Routes; Interstate; US; Primary; Secondary; Byways; History; HOT lanes
← SR 73	→ SR 75

State Route 74 (SR 74) is a primary state highway in the U.S. state of Virginia. Known for most of its length as Kentucky Avenue, the state highway runs 2.42 miles (3.89 km) from U.S. Route 23 Business (US 23 Business) and US 58 Alternate Business in Norton east to US 58 Alternate near Norton. SR 74 is the old alignment of US 58 Alternate in Norton. The highway was designated in 1958 from its western terminus to Kentucky Avenue and extended east in 1988.

== Route description ==
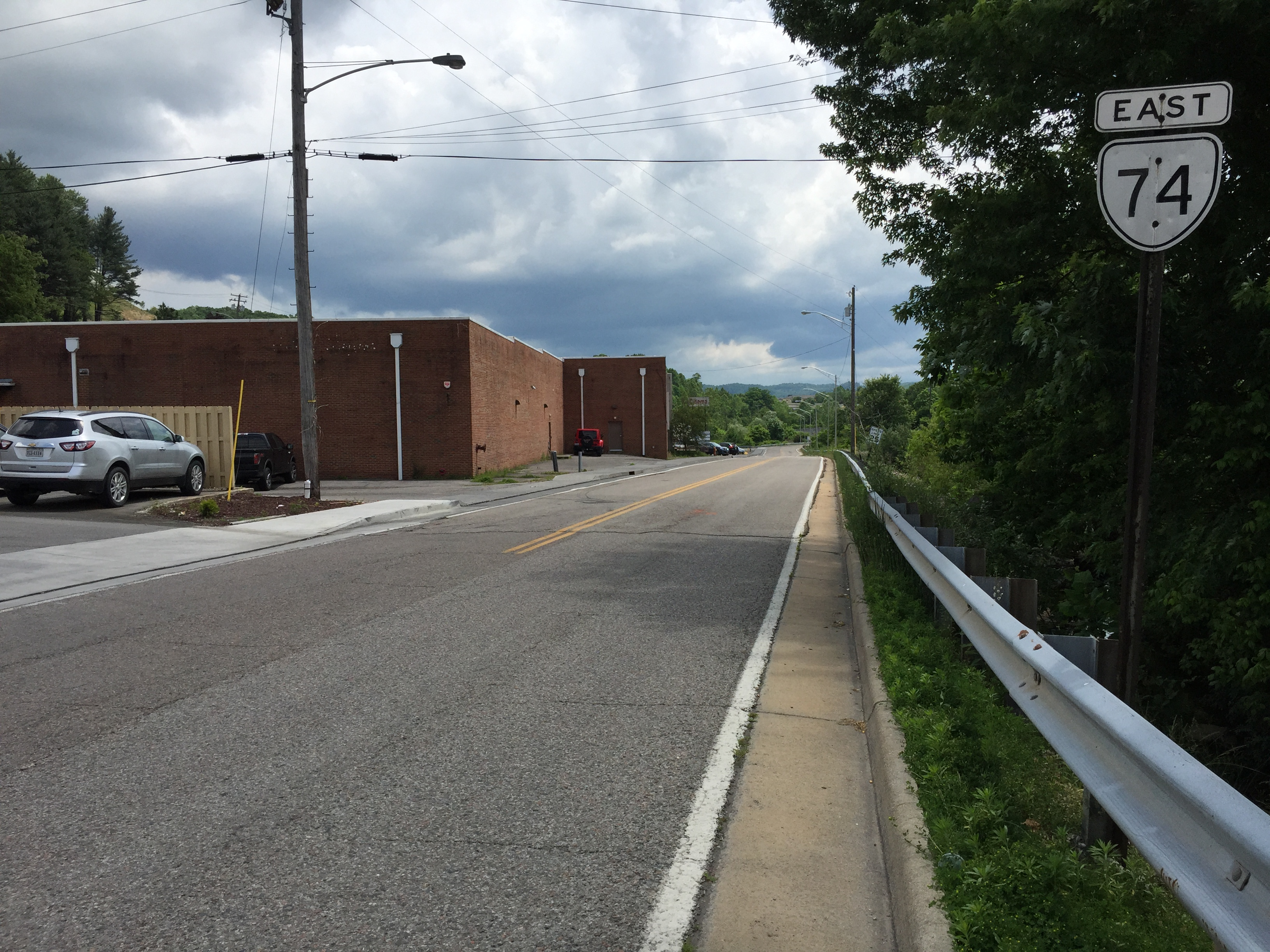
View east along SR 74 east of US 23 Bus./US 58 Alt. Bus. in Norton

SR 74 begins at US 23 Bus. and US 58 Alt. Bus. (Park Avenue) at the eastern end of downtown Norton. The state highway heads southeast on Coeburn Avenue, which has oblique, at-grade crossings with a pair of rail lines. Just east of the second crossing, SR 74 turns onto Kentucky Avenue. The state highway passes under the freeway carrying US 23 and US 58 Alternate. The highway has another at-grade rail intersection in the eastern portion of the city of Norton. Shortly after leaving the city limits, SR 74 curves north to pass under one of the rail lines and over the Guest River and reaches its eastern terminus at US 58 Alternate (Norton Coeburn Road) in the hamlet of Ramsey in Wise County. The roadway continues north as SR 681 (Bear Creek Road).

== History ==
SR 74 was initially part of SR 11, defined in 1918. It became part of SR 64 in 1933, SR 70 in 1940, and US 58 Alt. in the early 1950s. The first piece of SR 74 was designated in 1958 along Coeburn Road west of Kentucky Avenue, though it did not exist until the new US 58 Alternate along 11th Street and Kentucky Avenue was completed in 1960. The new US 58 Alternate (now partly US 23 Bus. and SR 283) in eastern Norton was completed in 1988, and SR 74 was extended east over the old road.

== Major intersections ==
County	Location	mi	km	Destinations	Notes
City of Norton		0.00	0.00	US 23 Bus. / US 58 Alt. Bus. – Business District, Wise, University of Virginia Wise, Appalachia	Western terminus
City of Norton				To US 58 Alt. / Kentucky Avenue	former US 58 Alt. west
Wise		2.42	3.89	US 58 Alt. (Norton Coeburn Road) / SR 681 (Bear Creek Road) to US 23 – Norton, Coeburn	Eastern terminus
1.000 mi = 1.609 km; 1.000 km = 0.621 mi
