= Varmint of Burke's Garden =

Virginian coyote responsible for the deaths of over 400 sheep

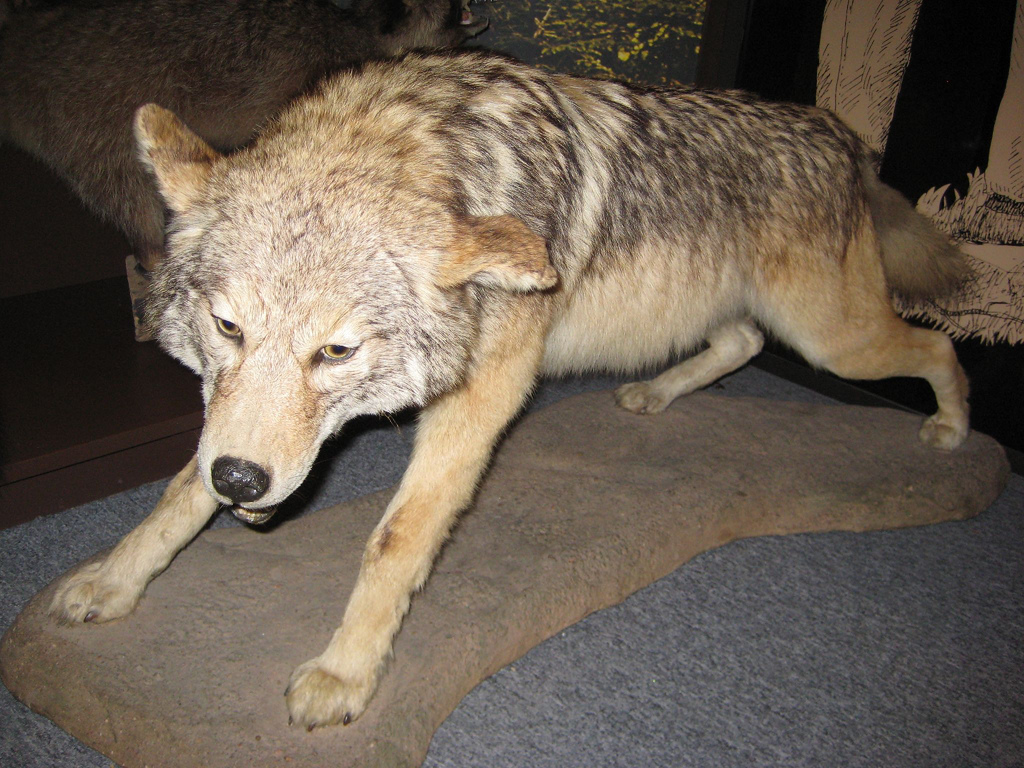
The "varmint" mounted and on display at Crab Orchard Museum.

The Varmint of Burke's Garden was the name given to a coyote that terrorized the community of Burke's Garden, Virginia, in 1952. The animal was believed to have killed at least 410 sheep, before being killed by hunters in February 1953. (Note: Sources variously cite February 22 or Valentine's Day as the date of the coyote's death.)

== Sheep killings ==
The "varmint" first attracted attention in February 1952, when six lambs were found dead in the snow, although several sheep losses prior to this may also have been caused by the same predator. Shortly afterwards, sheep losses started to occur almost nightly. The largest flock losses were suffered by farmers Harry Lineberry (94 sheep), Bob Davis (58) and Jim Hoge (50). Bowen Meek lost 42 of his 85 sheep, including his entire lamb crop, and sold the remaining sheep to offset his losses. In total, the "varmint" killed at least 410 sheep in Burke's Garden, collectively worth at least $23,000. (Note: The financial losses have been estimated at between $23,000 and $35,000.) For nearly a year, the predator's identity was unknown, although locals speculated that it was variously a dog, cat, wolf or wolverine. Based on fleeting sightings, some even suggested it was a baboon or kangaroo.

== Hunting the varmint ==
To aid in the creature's capture, the board of supervisors of Tazewell County contacted Clell and Dale Lee, two of the best-known big-game hunters then active in the United States. The men were residents of Arizona, but were requested to come to Virginia to help local residents. Dale Lee was in Venezuela hunting jaguars, but his brother Clell was available and answered the call. He arrived in Bluefield to find himself coolly received by local farmers; however, Mrs. Meek, the wife of one of the men, was kinder, and invited him to stay at her home.

Lee identified the animal by a track that had been left in a block of ice. His diagnosis shocked many, as no coyotes had been seen in the area in memory. Accompanied by the sheriff, as well as by local farmers, hunters, and game wardens, Lee and his dogs soon found the scent, following it for around five hours before nightfall.

Lee ordered all parties back to the hunt at dawn the next morning. The sheriff objected, saying that nobody in the county hunted on Sundays; Lee, however, explained that he had found a fresh scent, and saw no reason to impose upon locals any longer than necessary. Learning that the animal had struck again that night, killing two sheep, Lee stationed hunters near the site of the attack and set his dogs back on the scent. A Burke's Garden resident, Alfred Jones, killed the coyote after a chase of a few hours. Jones was accompanied by Dewey Tibbs and Hugh Cox. The coyote was killed in the Joe Moss Cemetery. Local residents were jubilant, and a dinner was held in Lee's honor.

The coyote measured nearly 4.5 feet (1.4 m) long and weighed 35 pounds (16 kg), and its fangs were an inch long. It was initially strung up in the local schoolyard, and more than 3,000 people came to see the dead animal. Later, it was hung from a tree near the Tazewell County Court House, attracting a further 7,500 visitors. The "varmint" was stuffed and is currently on display at the Crab Orchard Museum in Tazewell, Virginia.

== Marathon ==
In 1993, Burke's Garden began hosting the Varmint half marathon and 5,000 meter race, held annually in June. Winners receive trophies in the shape of sheep to commemorate the destruction caused by the "varmint".
