= Fourway, Rappahannock County, Virginia =

Unincorporated community in Virginia, US

Coordinates: 38°44′59″N 78°16′05″W

Fourway is an unincorporated community in Rappahannock County, in the U.S. state of Virginia.
