= Fourway, Tazewell County, Virginia =

Unincorporated community in Virginia, US

Coordinates: 37°8′0″N 81°29′35″W

Fourway, also known as Burkes Garden Siding, is a former unincorporated community in Tazewell County, Virginia, United States that has been annexed by the town of Tazewell. It includes the intersection of U.S. Route 19/460 Business with State Route 61.
