= Gratton, Virginia =

Gratton
- CDP
- Location within the Commonwealth of Virginia
- Coordinates: 37°8′7″N 81°25′13″W
- Country: United States
- State: Virginia
- County: Tazewell

Population (2010)
  - Total: 937
- Time zone: UTC−5 (Eastern (EST))
  - Summer (DST): UTC−4 (EDT)
- ZIP codes: 24651
- FIPS code: 51-32320
- GNIS feature ID: 2630777

Gratton is a census-designated place in Tazewell County, Virginia, United States. As of the 2020 census, Gratton had a population of 865.

== Demographics ==
Historical population
Census	Pop.	Note	%±
2010	937		—
2020	865		−7.7%
U.S. Decennial Census; 2010 2020

Gratton was first listed as a census designated place in the 2010 U.S. census.
