= Burke's Garden, Virginia =

Burke's Garden
- Unincorporated community
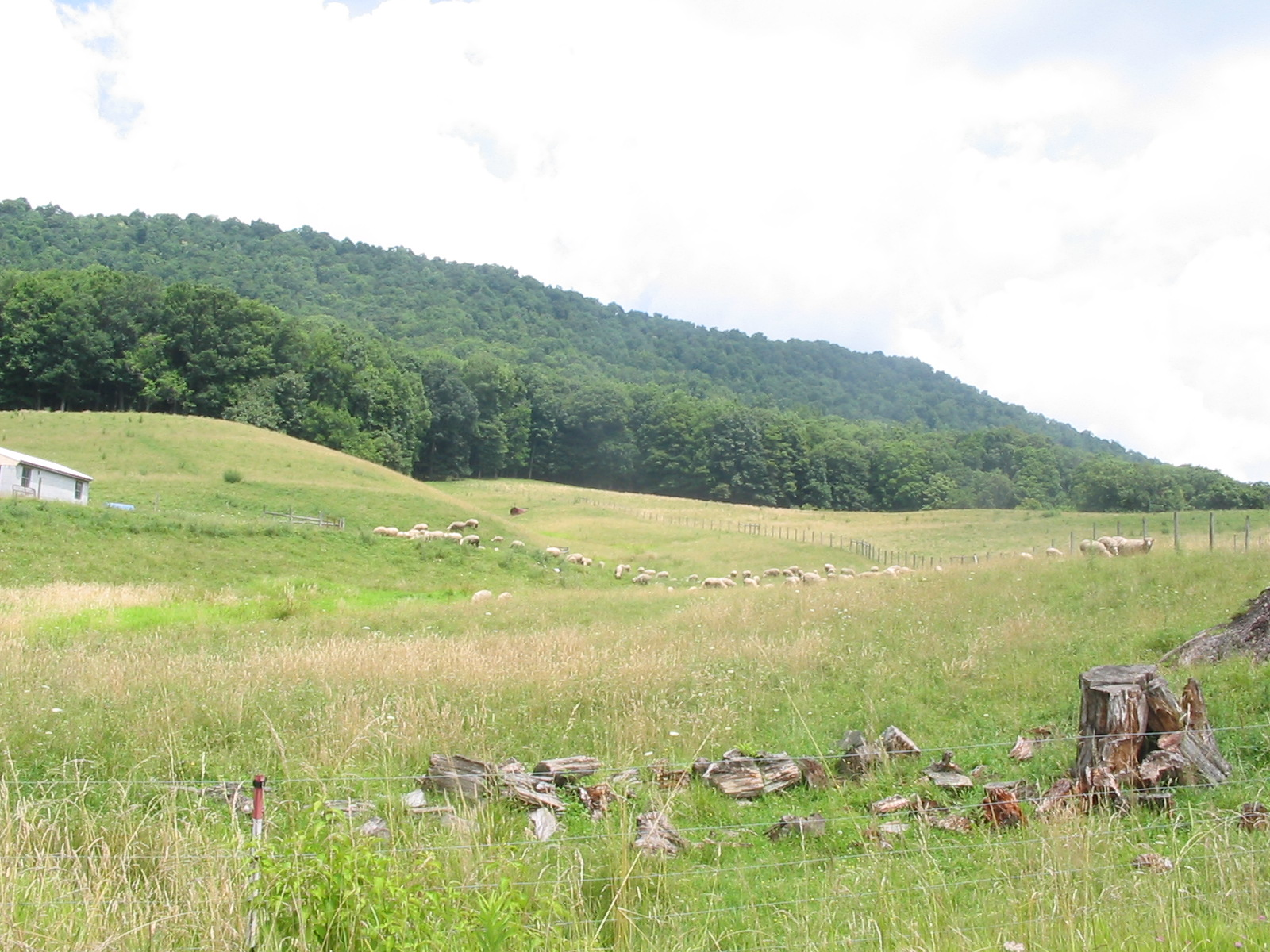
- View of Burke's Garden, Virginia, from the center of the basin

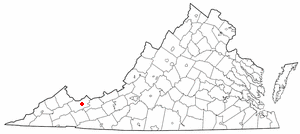
- Location of Burke's Garden, Virginia
- Coordinates: 37°06′08″N 81°20′35″W
- Country: United States
- State: Virginia
- County: Tazewell
- Elevation: 3,074 ft (937 m)

Population (Now)
  - Total: about 300
  - Density: 26/sq mi (10/km^{2})
- Time zone: UTC-5 (Eastern (EST))
  - Summer (DST): UTC-4 (EDT)
- ZIP code: 24608
- Area code: 276
- GNIS feature ID: 1498460

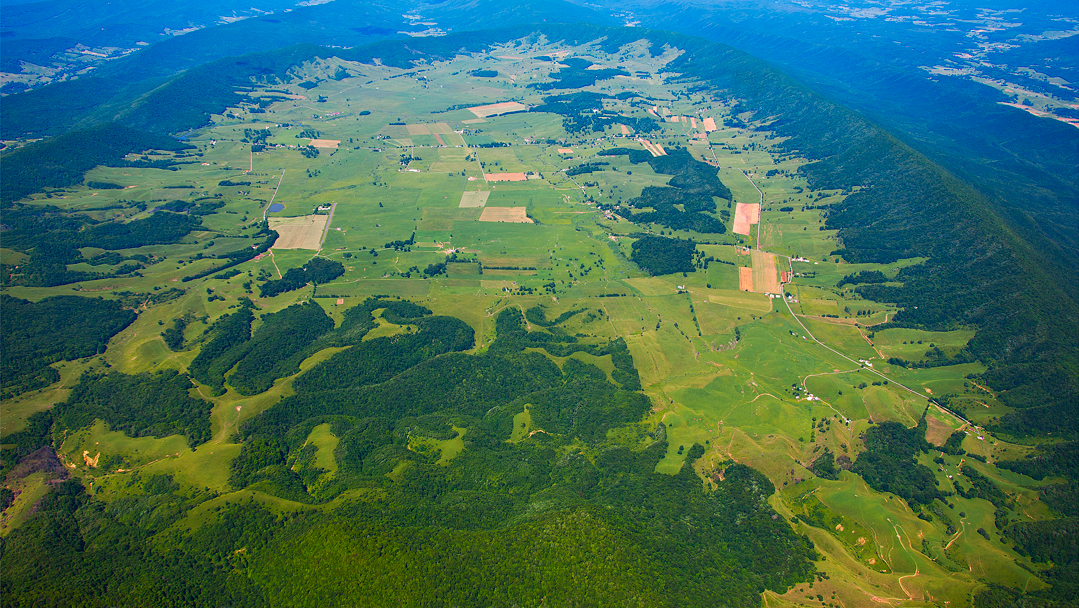
Aerial overview of the valley

Burke's Garden is an upland valley and unincorporated community in Tazewell County, Virginia, United States.

It is surrounded by the Garden Mountain Cluster, wild areas in the national forest recognized by the Wilderness Society as "Mountain Treasures", areas that are worthy of protection from logging and road construction.

== Geography and geology ==
The oval, bowl-like valley (or "cove") is known for its fertile land and was once the bed of an ancient sea. About 8.5 miles (13.7 km) long and 4 miles (6.4 km) wide, it resembles a large asteroid impact or volcanic crater in satellite photographs and on topographic maps; however, it is actually a dome-shaped geologic up-warp (anticline) that exposed older Ordovician aged limestone which is much more erodible than the younger Silurian sandstone of surrounding ridges. The mountain valley is the second highest in Virginia at around 3,000 feet (910 m) above sea level and is surrounded by Garden Mountain. This unusual topography is similar to that of Canaan Valley in neighboring West Virginia.

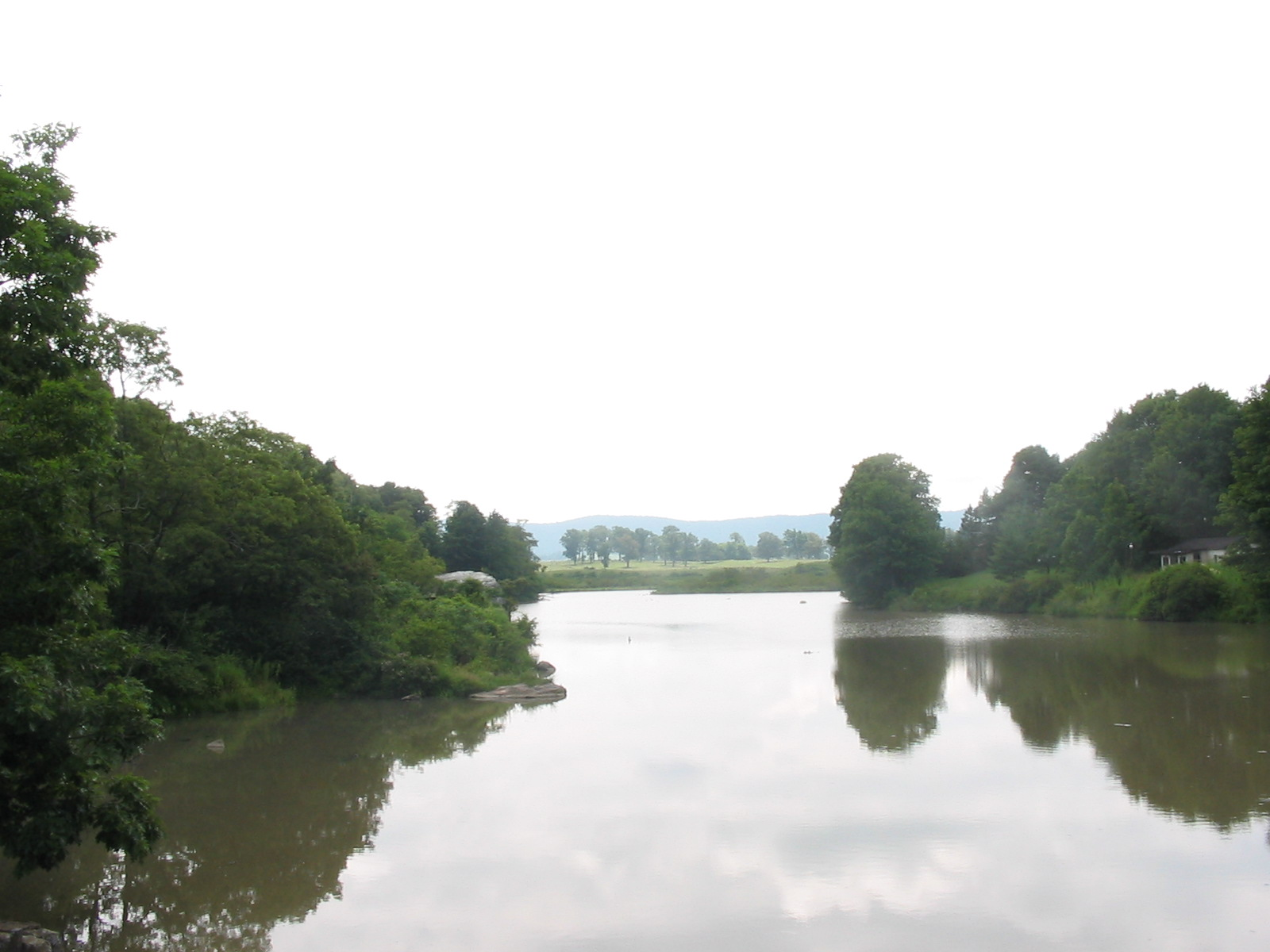
Mountain lake near Burke's Garden

=== Climate ===
According to the Köppen Climate Classification system, Burke's Garden has an oceanic climate, abbreviated "Cfb" on climate maps. The hottest temperature recorded in Burke's Garden was 97 °F (36.1 °C) on July 28, 1930, while the coldest temperature recorded was −27 °F (−32.8 °C) on December 30, 1917.

Climate data for Burke's Garden, Virginia, 1991–2020 normals, extremes 1896–present
Month	Jan	Feb	Mar	Apr	May	Jun	Jul	Aug	Sep	Oct	Nov	Dec	Year
Record high °F (°C)	76 (24)	73 (23)	81 (27)	86 (30)	92 (33)	94 (34)	97 (36)	96 (36)	92 (33)	88 (31)	77 (25)	74 (23)	97 (36)
Mean maximum °F (°C)	59.3 (15.2)	60.8 (16.0)	68.7 (20.4)	76.3 (24.6)	79.6 (26.4)	83.0 (28.3)	84.8 (29.3)	83.6 (28.7)	82.1 (27.8)	76.1 (24.5)	68.1 (20.1)	60.7 (15.9)	85.7 (29.8)
Mean daily maximum °F (°C)	39.3 (4.1)	42.4 (5.8)	50.4 (10.2)	61.2 (16.2)	68.9 (20.5)	75.6 (24.2)	78.8 (26.0)	77.5 (25.3)	72.8 (22.7)	62.6 (17.0)	51.7 (10.9)	42.9 (6.1)	60.3 (15.8)
Daily mean °F (°C)	30.1 (−1.1)	32.6 (0.3)	39.7 (4.3)	49.1 (9.5)	57.2 (14.0)	64.7 (18.2)	68.0 (20.0)	66.6 (19.2)	60.9 (16.1)	50.2 (10.1)	40.1 (4.5)	33.4 (0.8)	49.4 (9.7)
Mean daily minimum °F (°C)	20.9 (−6.2)	22.9 (−5.1)	29.0 (−1.7)	37.1 (2.8)	45.6 (7.6)	53.7 (12.1)	57.3 (14.1)	55.6 (13.1)	48.9 (9.4)	37.8 (3.2)	28.5 (−1.9)	23.9 (−4.5)	38.4 (3.6)
Mean minimum °F (°C)	−1.9 (−18.8)	3.0 (−16.1)	10.3 (−12.1)	20.7 (−6.3)	29.1 (−1.6)	39.7 (4.3)	46.0 (7.8)	44.5 (6.9)	33.9 (1.1)	21.0 (−6.1)	12.4 (−10.9)	4.3 (−15.4)	−5.1 (−20.6)
Record low °F (°C)	−23 (−31)	−24 (−31)	−10 (−23)	3 (−16)	19 (−7)	26 (−3)	31 (−1)	30 (−1)	21 (−6)	9 (−13)	−3 (−19)	−27 (−33)	−27 (−33)
Average precipitation inches (mm)	3.98 (101)	3.67 (93)	4.42 (112)	4.05 (103)	4.72 (120)	4.27 (108)	4.62 (117)	4.03 (102)	3.64 (92)	3.16 (80)	2.96 (75)	4.05 (103)	47.57 (1,206)
Average snowfall inches (cm)	13.2 (34)	11.4 (29)	9.1 (23)	1.3 (3.3)	0.0 (0.0)	0.0 (0.0)	0.0 (0.0)	0.0 (0.0)	0.0 (0.0)	0.6 (1.5)	2.2 (5.6)	9.1 (23)	46.9 (119.4)
Average extreme snow depth inches (cm)	6.1 (15)	6.0 (15)	4.9 (12)	0.9 (2.3)	0.0 (0.0)	0.0 (0.0)	0.0 (0.0)	0.0 (0.0)	0.0 (0.0)	0.6 (1.5)	1.4 (3.6)	4.6 (12)	9.6 (24)
Average precipitation days (≥ 0.01 in)	14.7	12.9	13.8	12.8	15.5	15.4	16.1	14.3	10.9	10.8	10.3	13.9	161.4
Average snowy days (≥ 0.1 in)	6.6	6.1	4.4	0.9	0.0	0.0	0.0	0.0	0.0	0.2	1.6	5.0	24.8
Source 1: NOAA
Source 2: National Weather Service

== History ==
The area was long occupied by a variety of indigenous peoples.

Burke's Garden was first surveyed in 1748 by a team of surveyors working for local landowner James Patton. One of the party, James Burke, an Irishman, is said to have thrown away some potato peelings while cooking. A year later, when the party returned to the area, they found potatoes growing in the area where the peels had been left. The area was dubbed Burke's Garden as something of a joke, but the name stuck. In 1749, William Ingles went to Burke's Garden to build a house with his uncle, John Ingles. The community was an outpost of German immigrants who settled in the backcountry frontier in the late 18th century.

The area remained relatively isolated as it was not near the transportation corridors of major rivers. In the late 19th century, agents for the Vanderbilt family contacted local farmers about selling land so that the family could build a large estate there. Nobody wanted to sell, and the Vanderbilts instead constructed their Biltmore Estate near Asheville, North Carolina.

In the 1990s, a small number of Amish families moved to Burke's Garden, but later they moved out after being unable to purchase enough land and attract enough other Amish families to form a viable community. Today Amish have returned to Burkes Garden and have a thriving community. Lines of scooters can be seen daily outside the Burkes Garden School and Community Center where the Amish now have their own school. According to Chris Wesner of AmishAmerica there Amish community consisted of about 100 persons in 2021.

The county's oldest church, the Central Lutheran church, is located in Burke's Garden. It originally served multiple denominations so was called Union Church. When the congregation learned their Union Church had joined the Lutheran denomination most members left and established Methodist and Presbyterian churches. In 1952, the community was terrorized by the "Varmint of Burke's Garden", a large coyote that killed many local sheep and caused much damage before being killed.

The area is drained by Wolf Creek (a tributary of the New River) which flows out of the geographic bowl in a northeasterly direction.

The entire valley is listed on the National Register of Historic Places as the Burke's Garden Rural Historic District; the Burke's Garden Central Church and Cemetery is also listed on the NRHP.

== See also ==
- National Register of Historic Places listings in Tazewell County, Virginia
