= Bonny Blue, Virginia =

Unincorporated community in Virginia, United States

- Unincorporated community
- Location within Virginia Location within the United States
- Coordinates: 36°49′37″N 83°4′6″W
- Country: United States
- State: Virginia
- County: Lee
- Elevation: 1,890 ft (580 m)
- Time zone: UTC-5 (Eastern (EST))
  - Summer (DST): UTC-4 (EDT)
- Area code: 276
- GNIS feature ID: 1481930

Bonny Blue is an unincorporated community and coal town in Lee County, Virginia, United States.

== History ==
The community was likely named for the Bonnie Blue flag, the unofficial banner of the Confederacy at the start of the Civil War.

Bonny Blue contained a post office until 1962.
