= Stone Creek, Virginia =

Unincorporated community in Virginia, United States

- Unincorporated community
- Location within Virginia Location within the United States
- Coordinates: 36°46′35″N 83°3′25″W
- Country: United States
- State: Virginia
- County: Lee
- Elevation: 1,447 ft (441 m)
- Time zone: UTC−5 (Eastern (EST))
  - Summer (DST): UTC−4 (EDT)
- GNIS feature ID: 1497165

Stone Creek is an unincorporated community in Lee County, Virginia, United States.

Stone Creek took its name from a creek noted for its rocky bed.
