= Virginia State Route 113 =

State highway in Bristol, Virginia, US

State Route 113

Route information
- Maintained by VDOT
- Length: 1.33 mi (2.14 km)
- Existed: 1966–present

Major junctions
- South end: US 11E / US 19 / US 421 / SR 381 in Bristol
- North end: US 11 / US 19 in Bristol

Location
- Country: United States
- State: Virginia
- Counties: City of Bristol

Highway system
- Virginia Routes; Interstate; US; Primary; Secondary; Byways; History; HOT lanes
← SR 112	→ SR 114

State Route 113 (SR 113) is an unsigned primary state highway in the U.S. state of Virginia. The state highway runs 1.33 miles (2.14 km) from U.S. Route 11E (US 11E), US 19, US 421, and SR 381 north to US 11 and US 19 within Bristol.

== Route description ==
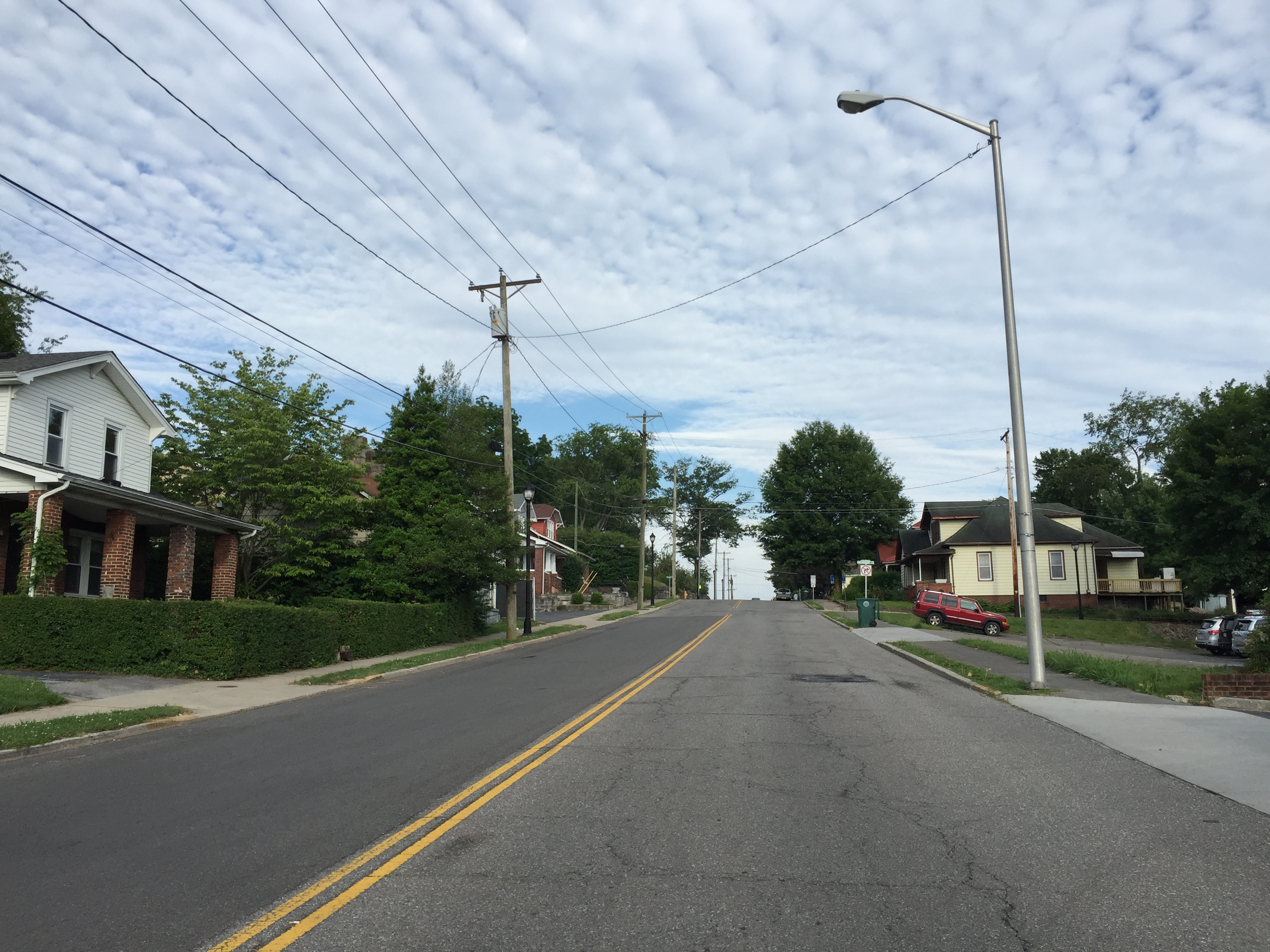
View east at the south end of SR 113 at US 11E/US 19/US 421/SR 381 in Bristol

SR 113 begins at a one-way pair at separate intersections with Commonwealth Avenue, which carries US 11E, US 19, US 421, and SR 381, north of downtown Bristol. SR 113 heads east from Commonwealth Avenue along Cumberland Street and west toward the avenue as Sycamore Street, both of which are two-way streets. Northbound SR 113 meets US 421 again at the corner of Cumberland Street and Piedmont Avenue; US 421 heads south on Piedmont and east on Commonwealth while SR 113 turns north on Piedmont. One block to the north at Sycamore Street, the one-way pair ends and both directions of the state highway follow Piedmont Avenue. The state highway passes under a rail line then veers northeast onto Oakview Avenue, which passes to the west of the former Virginia Intermont College. Just north of the college, SR 113 intersects Moore Street and the northern end of Martin Luther King Jr. Boulevard, which carries US 11 Truck and US 19 Truck. The state highway and the two truck routes continue on Moore Street north to their concurrent termini at US 11 and US 19, which head west as Euclid Avenue and northeast as Lee Highway.

== Major intersections ==
The entire route is in Bristol.

mi	km	Destinations	Notes
0.00	0.00	Commonwealth Avenue (US 11E / US 19 / US 421 / US 11 Truck / SR 381)	Southern terminus
0.28	0.45	US 11 Truck / US 19 Truck (Piedmont Avenue / Cumberland Street)	former US 421
1.21	1.95	US 11 Truck south / US 19 Truck south (Martin Luther King Jr. Boulevard)	south end of US 11 Truck / US 19 Truck overlap
1.33	2.14	US 11 / US 19 (Euclid Avenue / Lee Highway) to I-81	Northern terminus; north end of US 11 Truck / US 19 Truck overlap
1.000 mi = 1.609 km; 1.000 km = 0.621 mi
