= Bristol Commercial Historic District =

Historic district in Tennessee, United States

- U.S. National Register of Historic Places
- U.S. Historic district
- Virginia Landmarks Register
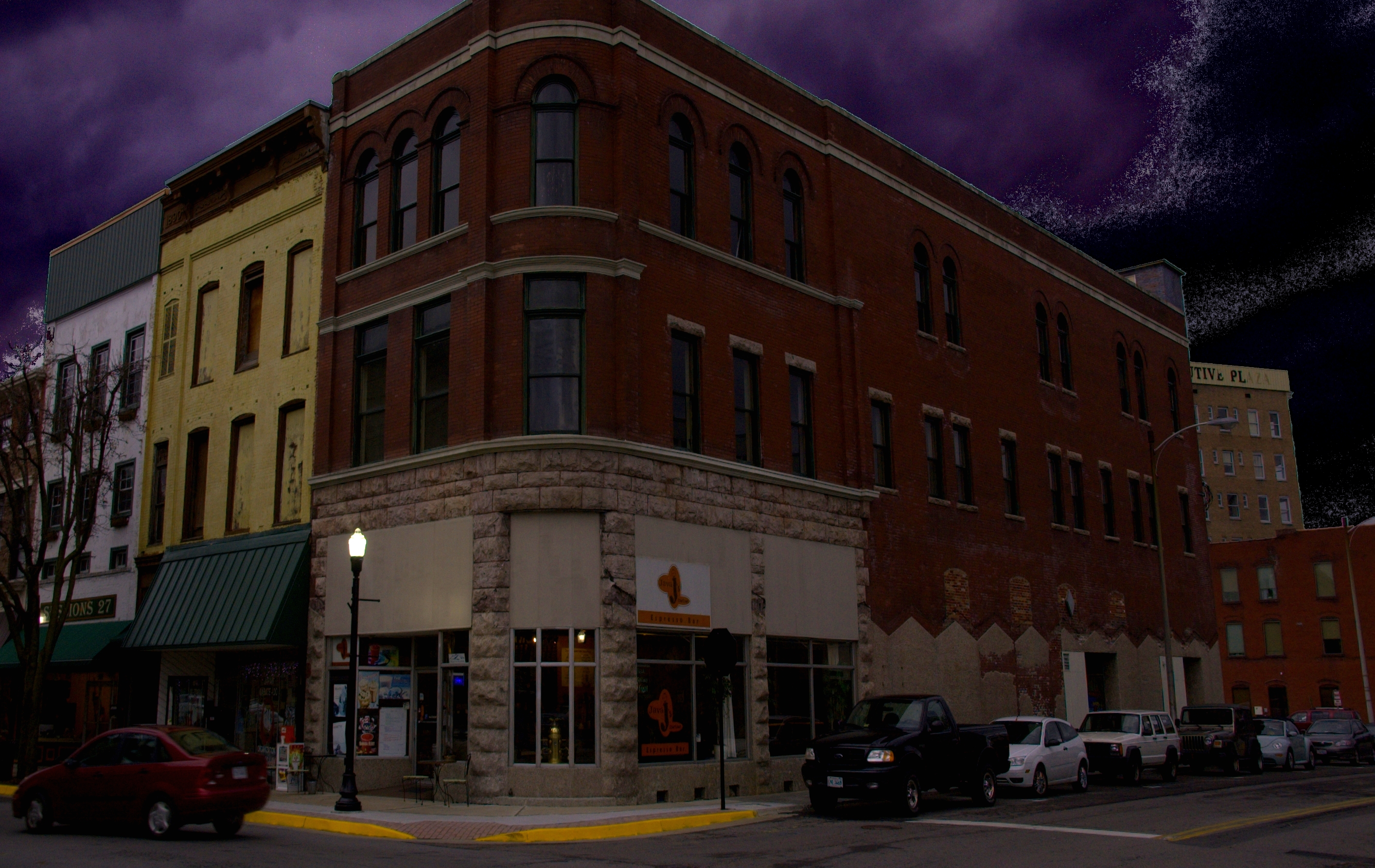
- The Susong Building, located in the historic district at 22 Lee St.

- Location within Virginia Location within the United States
- Location: Roughly along State, Piedmont, Moore, Shelby, Bank, Progress, 5th, 6th, 7th, and 8th Sts., Bristol, Tennessee and Bristol, Virginia
- Coordinates: 36°35′38″N 82°11′3″W
- Area: 23 acres (9.3 ha)
- Architect: Keaton, Clarence B.; Taylor, James Knox
- Architectural style: Early Commercial, Beaux Arts, et al.
- NRHP reference No.: 03000441 (original); 100001640 (increase)
- VLR No.: 102-5017

Significant dates
- Added to NRHP: May 22, 2003
- Boundary increase: September 18, 2017
- Designated VLR: June 12, 2002, June 17, 2005, October 11, 2005

The Bristol Commercial Historic District is a national historic district in Bristol, Tennessee and Bristol, Virginia.

The district encompasses 83 contributing buildings in the central business district of Bristol. The district straddles the Tennessee-Virginia border. The area was developed in the late 19th and early 20th centuries contains primarily two- and three-story masonry commercial buildings constructed from ca. 1890 to the early 1950s. Notable buildings include the Y.M.C.A (c. 1905), H.P. King Department Store (c. 1905), Reynolds Arcade (1925), Bristol Grocery Company building (c. 1915), Service Mills Company buildings (1922), E.W. King Manufacturing Company (1913), Cameo Theater (1930), Bristol, Virginia Post Office (1933), Central Building (1945), and McCrory's Department Store (1951). The First National Bank of Bristol (1905), US Post Office-Shelby Street Station (1900), and Paramount Theatre and Office Building (1929–1930) are separately listed.

It was listed on the National Register of Historic Places in 2003, and was slightly increased in size in 2017.
