= Woodway, Virginia =

Unincorporated community in Virginia, United States

- Unincorporated community
- Location within Virginia Location within the United States
- Coordinates: 36°43′54″N 82°59′32″W
- Country: United States
- State: Virginia
- County: Lee
- Elevation: 1,453 ft (443 m)
- Time zone: UTC−5 (Eastern (EST))
  - Summer (DST): UTC−4 (EDT)
- GNIS feature ID: 1476983

Woodway is an unincorporated community in Lee County, Virginia, United States.

Elk Knob Elementary School is located in the community.

== History ==
A post office was established at Woodway in 1935, and remained in operation until it was discontinued in 1963. The community was named for a postmaster.
