= List of dams and reservoirs of the Tennessee River =

The Tennessee Valley Authority operates the Tennessee River system to provide a wide range of public benefits: year-round navigation, flood damage reduction, affordable electricity, improved water quality and water supply, recreation, and economic growth.

The TVA established the stairway of twenty-nine dams and thirteen locks that turned the Tennessee River into a 652-mile-long river highway. Dams and reservoirs on the main stem of the river include the following (listed from the furthest upstream to the furthest downstream):

- Fort Loudoun Dam impounds Fort Loudoun Lake
- Watts Bar Dam impounds Watts Bar Lake
- Chickamauga Dam impounds Chickamauga Lake
- Nickajack Dam impounds Nickajack Lake
- Guntersville Dam impounds Guntersville Lake
- Wheeler Dam impounds Wheeler Lake
- Wilson Dam impounds Wilson Lake
- Pickwick Landing Dam impounds Pickwick Lake
- Kentucky Dam impounds Kentucky Lake

Tributary dams and reservoirs include:

- Apalachia Dam on the Hiwassee River forms Apalachia Reservoir
- Blue Ridge Dam dams the Toccoa River, forming Blue Ridge Reservoir
- Boone Dam on the South Fork Holston River forms Boone Reservoir
- Chatuge Dam dams the Hiwassee River to form Chatuge Reservoir
- Cherokee Dam on the Holston River forms Cherokee Lake
- Douglas Dam on the French Broad River impounds Douglas Lake
- Elk River Dam on the Elk River forms Woods Reservoir
- Fontana Dam on the Little Tennessee River impounds Fontana Lake
- Fort Patrick Henry Dam on the South Fork Holston River impounds Fort Patrick Henry Lake
- Hiwassee Dam dams the Hiwassee River immediately above Apalachia Reservoir
- Melton Hill Dam on the Clinch River forms Melton Hill Lake
- Nolichucky Dam on the Nolichucky River impounds Davy Crockett Lake
- Normandy Dam on the Duck River impounds Normandy Reservoir
- Norris Dam on the Clinch River impounds Norris Lake
- Nottely Dam on the Nottely River forms Lake Nottely
- Ocoee Dam No. 1 on the Ocoee River impounds Parksville Reservoir
- Ocoee Dam No. 2 on the Ocoee River impounds Ocoee Lake No. 2
- Ocoee Dam No. 3 on the Ocoee River impounds Ocoee Lake No. 3
- South Holston Dam dams the South Fork Holston River, forming South Holston Lake
- Tellico Dam on the Little Tennessee River forms Tellico Lake
- Tims Ford Dam on the Elk River impounds Tims Ford Lake
- Watauga Dam on the Watauga River impounds Watauga Lake
- Wilbur Dam on the Watauga River impounds Wilbur Reservoir
