= Fort Patrick Henry Dam =

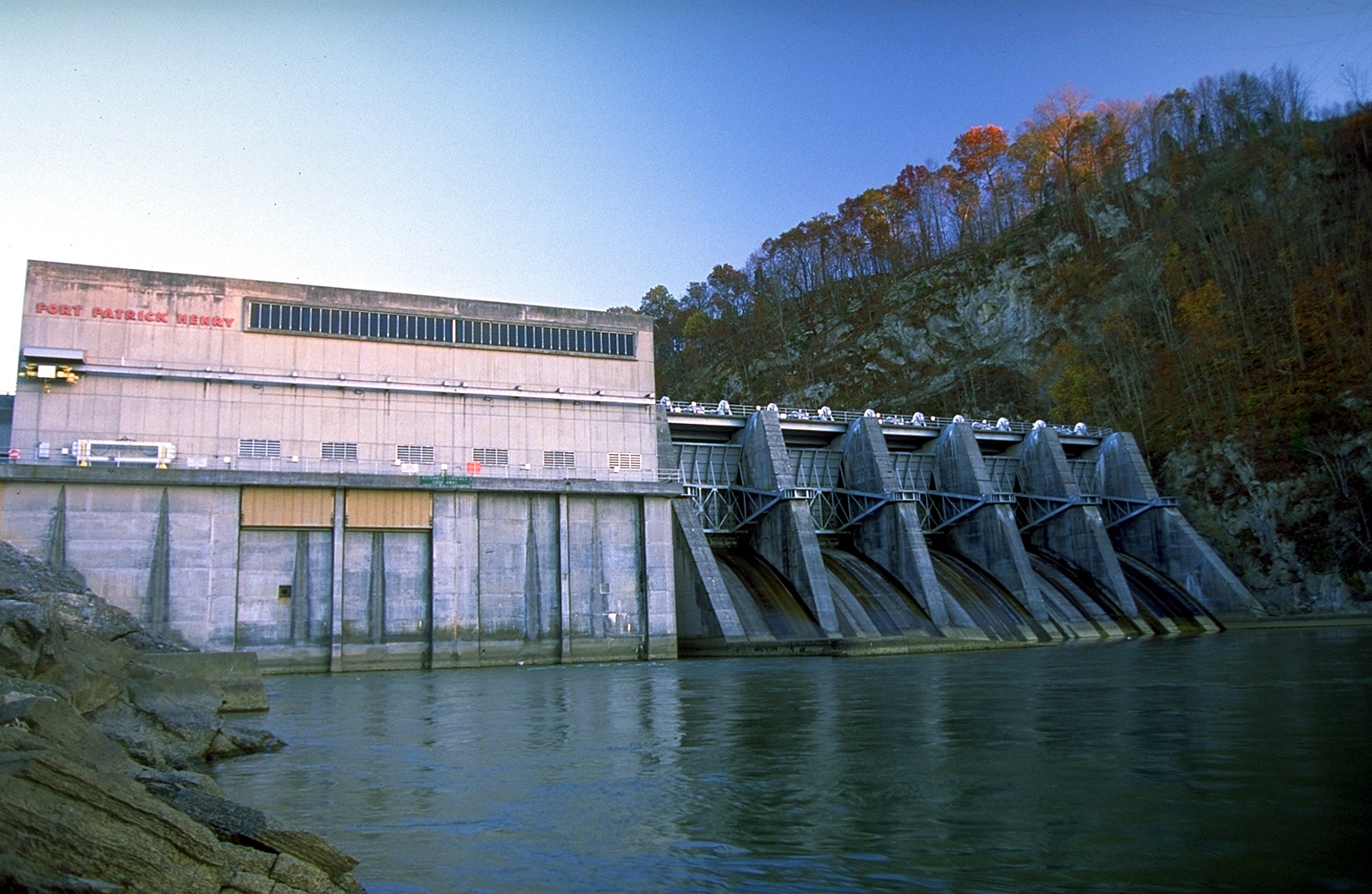
- Fort Patrick Henry Dam
- Interactive map of Fort Patrick Henry Dam
- Official name: Fort Patrick Henry Dam
- Location: Kingsport, Tennessee, U.S.
- Coordinates: 36°29′52″N 82°30′30″W
- Construction began: May 14, 1951
- Opening date: October 27, 1953
- Operator: Tennessee Valley Authority

Dam and spillways
- Impounds: South Fork Holston River
- Height: 95 feet (29 m)
- Length: 737 feet (225 m)

Reservoir
- Creates: Fort Patrick Henry Lake

Fort Patrick Henry Dam is a hydroelectric dam on the South Fork Holston River within the city of Kingsport, in Sullivan County in the U.S. state of Tennessee. It is the lowermost of three dams on the South Fork Holston owned and operated by the Tennessee Valley Authority, which built the dam in the early 1950s to take advantage of the hydroelectric potential created by the regulation of river flow with the completion of Watauga Dam, South Holston Dam, and Boone Dam (which were primarily flood control structures) further upstream in preceding years. The dam impounds the 872-acre (353 ha) Fort Patrick Henry Lake. While originally built for hydroelectric generation, the dam now plays an important role in the regulation of water flow and water temperature for the John Sevier Fossil Plant and other industrial plants downstream. The dam and associated infrastructure were listed on the National Register of Historic Places in 2017.

Fort Patrick Henry Dam is named for a Revolutionary War-era fort once located at nearby Long Island of the Holston. Both the dam and fort are named for Virginia Founding Father Patrick Henry.

== Location ==
Fort Patrick Henry Dam is located 8 miles (13 km) above the South Fork Holston River's confluence with the North Fork Holston River (which forms the Holston River proper). The city center of Kingsport is just northwest of the dam, and the unincorporated community of Colonial Heights is also nearby. Warriors' Path State Park occupies part of Fort Patrick Henry Lake's shoreline. Fort Patrick Henry Dam is 44 miles (71 km) upstream from the retention dam at John Sevier Fossil Plant and about 98 miles (158 km) upstream from Cherokee Dam, both of which are on the Holston River proper.

== Capacity ==
Fort Patrick Henry Dam is a concrete gravity-type dam 95 feet (29 m) high and 737 feet (225 m) long, and has a generating capacity of 59,400 kilowatts. The dam's overfall spillway has five radial gates with a combined maximum discharge of 141,000 cubic feet per second (4,000 m^{3}/s). Fort Patrick Henry Lake extends 10.3 miles (16.6 km) up the South Fork Holston to the base of Boone Dam and has 37 miles (60 km) of shoreline. The dam is not operated for flood-storage capacity.

== Background and construction ==
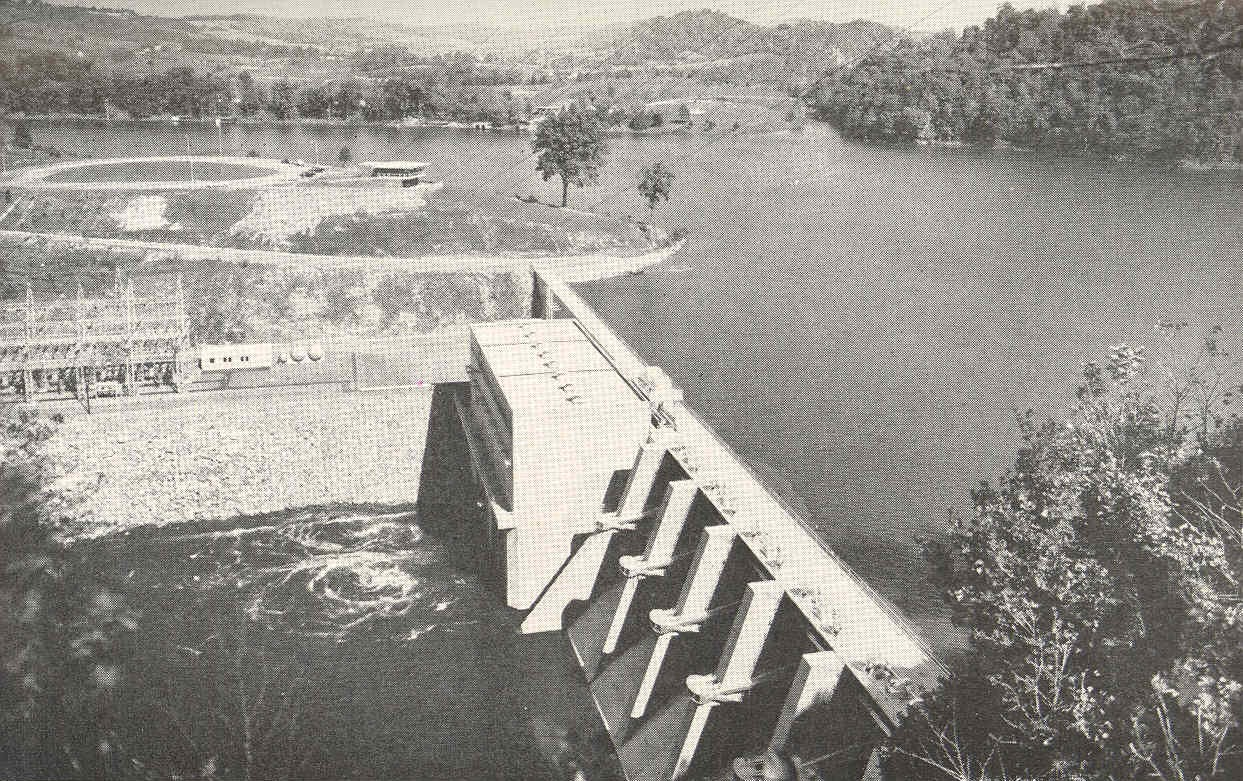
Fort Patrick Henry Dam shortly after construction in the mid-1950s

Public and private entities were aware of the hydroelectric potential of the South Fork Holston River by the early 1900s, when the Watauga Power Company built Wilbur Dam (completed 1912) on the river's Watauga River tributary. In the 1920s, the Holston River Power Company conducted a large-scale survey of the South Fork Holston with plans to build four dams along the river and market the dams' electrical power to nearby cities. Around the same time, the U.S. Army Corps of Engineers proposed building a dam at the "Pactolus site", roughly a mile downstream from the present Fort Patrick Henry Dam site. When the Tennessee Valley Authority gained oversight of flood control operations in the area in the 1930s, they identified the present dam site (which they initially called the "Wexler Bend site") as more favorable. TVA's completion of Watauga Dam and South Holston Dam and the impending construction of Boone Dam in 1950 would regulate the river's flow in such a manner as to make a downriver hydroelectric project feasible. Work on Fort Patrick Henry Dam began on May 14, 1951.

The construction of Fort Patrick Henry Dam and its reservoir required the purchase of 1,470 acres (590 ha) of land, 167 acres (68 ha) of which had to be cleared. 22 families and 2 miles (3.2 km) of roads had to be relocated, and one new bridge had to be built. The dam was completed and its gates closed October 27, 1953. The dam's first generator went online December 5, 1953 and its second generator went online February 22, 1954. The total cost of the Fort Patrick Henry project was $12.3 million.
