= Bee Cliff (Tennessee) =

The Bee Cliff is a prominent northeast Tennessee geological limestone feature with high caves that overlooks the Watauga River and the Siam community of Carter County, Tennessee.

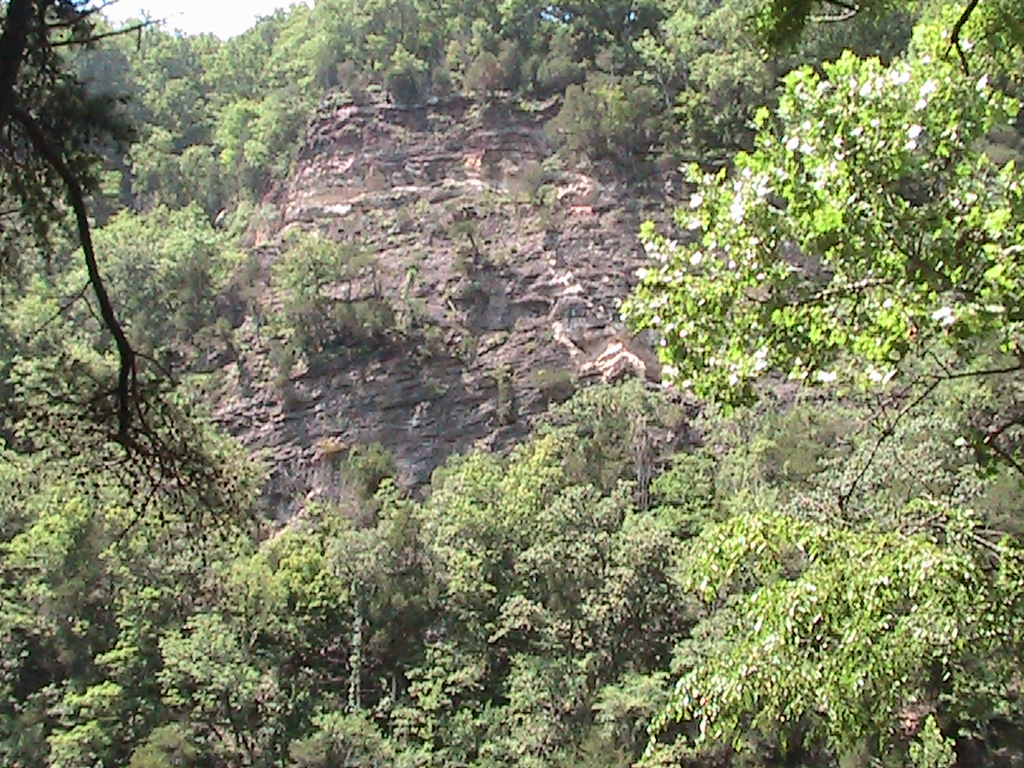
An upper section of the Bee Cliff approximately 100 meters above and adjacent to the Watauga River.

== Geography ==
The Bee Cliff and the Bee Cliff Rapids are located southeast of Elizabethton, Tennessee.

Bee Cliff is located in northeastern Tennessee at 36°21′07″N 82°08′11″W 36.351944° North, -82.136389° West.

The lower face of the Bee Cliff is across and immediately above the Watauga River from Wilbur Dam Road.

The summit of the Bee Cliff is located off Blue Springs Road across the Watauga River from the Wilbur Dam Road.

The elevation at the Bee Cliff summit is 1,968 feet (600 m).

=== Travel afloat ===
By travel afloat on the Watauga River, the Bee Cliff is located approximately 10 to 15 minutes downstream from the Tennessee Valley Authority Wilbur and Watauga dams and approximately one hour and forty-five minutes upstream of the city of Elizabethton, Tennessee.

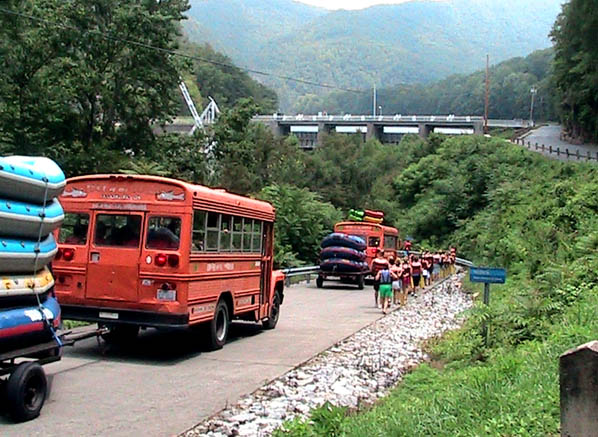
Whitewater rafting guides and paddlers make their way down the ramp to the TVA Wilbur Dam (background) put-in.

For whitewater rafting and kayaking on the Watauga River, the most popular Carter County "put-in" for whitewater rafting is found immediately downstream of the Wilbur Dam and the most popular "take-out" is found approximately 2 to 2½ hours downstream (depending upon the volume of the reservoir release and other factors) at the Blackbottom riverside portion of the linear trail in Elizabethton. While floating downstream "straight shot" on the Watauga River, you can reference several local landmarks in order to estimate your length of time and distance on the river to Elizabethton:

- approximately thirty minutes to float downstream to the old iron bridge at the Siam community (long stretch of flat water);
- approximately sixty minutes to float to the first concrete bridge at the Hunter community (beginning of brief swift and punchy rapids on right bank);
- approximately ninety minutes to float to the concrete U.S. Highway 19E bridge and Carter Mansion (coming on fast rapids onto steep left bank) at Elizabethton, and;
- approximately one hundred twenty minutes (two hours) to float to the Blackbottom "take-out" in Elizabethton.

The distance afloat from the put-in at Wilbur Dam to the Blackbottom take-out is approximately seven miles (11 km).

== Bee Cliff Rapids ==
=== Difficulty of the rapids ===
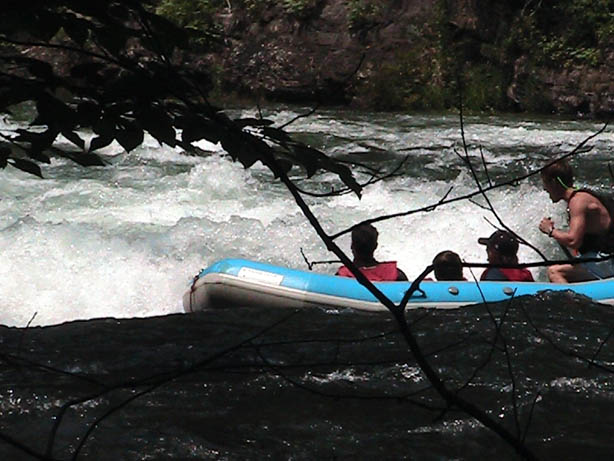
Upstream image of a guide in the Bee Cliff Rapids sliding his raft sideways into "The Big Hole".

Immediately before the Bee Cliff is an approximately 150 yard stretch of Class I and Class II whitewater rapids on the Watauga River known locally as the Bee Cliff Rapids (although some North Carolina river guides mistakenly refer to this run as the Anaconda Rapids). The Bee Cliff Rapids are approximately 15 to 20 minutes downstream of the TVA Wilbur Dam "put-in" or launch.

On the left-hand (port) downstream side of the Bee Cliff Rapids (and on the opposite side of the Watauga River from the Bee Cliff) is a private, wooded area with trails --- utilized by commercial rating companies with paid landing permit --- running parallel with and further downstream from the Bee Cliff Rapids. Locals also refer to this particular wooded section of the Watauga River as "Bee Cliff'.

The international scale of river difficulty classification of these rapids at the Bee Cliff are largely dependent upon the scheduled release of impounded reservoir water from behind the Tennessee Valley Authority Wilbur and Watauga Dams. TVA runs a summer release schedule that frequently provides considerably faster water, especially on Saturdays, for what local river guides refer to as "Big Water Saturday". This means that the Bee Cliff Rapids and the rest of the Watauga River can approach higher-end Class II and Class III (especially when the TVA is also releasing water over the Wilbur Dam spillways).

=== Water hazards ===
There are several minor water hazards at the Bee Cliff Rapids that paddlers should keep in mind:

- Personal flotation devices (life jackets) and water footwear are required;
- The water temperature is approximately 53 °F (12 °C) (even during the summer months) as this impounded reservoir water being released from behind a dam;
- Be aware that the "Big Hole" (formed by water dropping over an underwater ledge) is found approximately 10 to 20 feet (3–6 m) off the downstream port (left) bank near the end of the Bee Cliff Rapids;
- Rain and prevailing wind conditions through the Siam valley often create thick blankets of fog following moderate to heavy rain storms;
- Steep underwater slides are found in the center-to-starboard (right) downstream bottom section of the Bee Cliff Rapids that can easily flip a canoe end-over-end;
- A sharp-edged and small limestone boulder found above the waterline that has punctured inflatable rafts is located at the downstream starboard (right) bank immediately at the end of the Bee Cliff Rapids.

== Recreation ==
Whitewater rafting, kayaking, canoeing, fly fishing, and angling with fishing reels are all popular recreation activities pursued at the Bee Cliff. Rainbow trout, brown trout, and striped bass are all caught in the Watauga River.

=== Whitewater ===
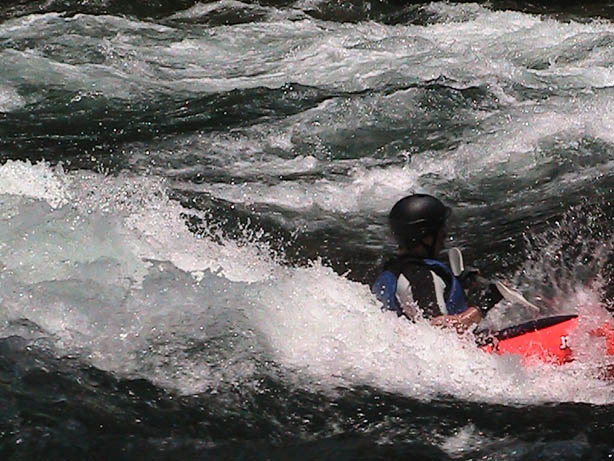
Kayaker at the Bee Cliff Rapids paddling inside "The Big Hole".

The Watauga River downstream of the TVA dams draws commercial rafting outfitters from both northeast Tennessee and western North Carolina during the summer months and commercial fishing guides throughout the year.The picturesque Class II+ Bee Cliff Rapids on the Watauga River (also referred to the "Anaconda Rapids" by some North Carolina–based rafting companies) are found downstream between Wilbur Dam and the Siam Bridge, southeast of Elizabethton, Tennessee.

For commercial whitewater rafting and kayaking on the Watauga River, the most popular Carter County "put-in" for is immediately downstream of the TVA Wilbur Dam, and the most popular "take-out" is 2 to 2½ hours downstream (depending upon the volume of the reservoir release and other factors) at the Blackbottom riverside portion of the city linear trail park in Elizabethton.

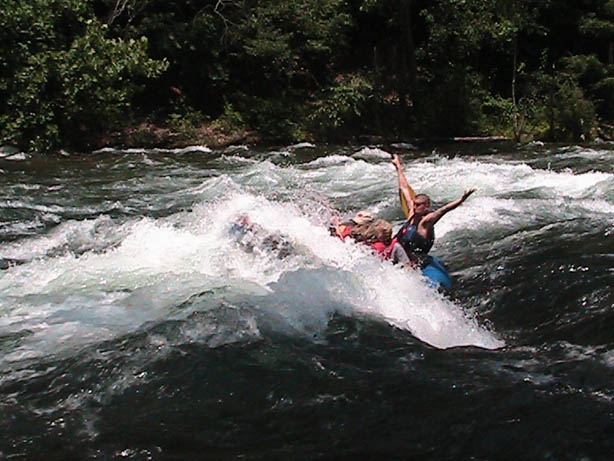
Raft guide plunging whitewater rafters downstream through "The Big Hole" in the Bee Cliff Rapids

The distance afloat for paddlers from the put-in at Wilbur Dam to the Blackbottom take-out is approximately seven miles with landmarks along the Watauga River providing good estimate of time and distance traveled.

Wilbur Dam to Bee Cliff Rapids	15 minutes
Wilbur Dam to Siam Bridge	45 minutes
Wilbur Dam to Hunter Bridge (TWRA put-in/take out)	75 minutes
Wilbur Dam to Gilbert Peters Bridge at US 19-E in Elizabethton	105 minutes
Wilbur Dam to Bristol Bridge in Elizabethton	135 minutes

The Watauga also has a section of Class IV-V whitewater popular with expert kayakers, upstream of Watauga Lake. This section requires significant rainfall to bring it up to runnable levels. It features continuous steep boulder bed rapids dropping up to 150 feet per mile (28 m/km), and several falls and ledges only runnable by expert paddlers.

=== TVA recreation areas ===
The Tennessee Valley Authority maintains a self-service public campground just minutes upstream of the Bee Cliff. Amenities and recreational opportunities at the TVA Watauga Dam Tailwater Campground include 29 camp sites with electric hookups, rest rooms with heated showers and flush toilets, dump station, public phone, picnic tables and grills, canoe access, boat ramps above and below dam, lake and river fishing, hiking trail, walking trail, wildlife viewing area, birdwatching.

=== Influence of weather ===
The Tennessee Valley Authority (TVA) regulates flow of the Watauga River by scheduling the release of deep, impounded reservoir waters from behind both the TVA Watauga Dam and the TVA Wilbur Dam. As a result, the summer temperature of the Watauga River at the Bee Cliff is approximately 52–53°F (11–12°C). The Watauga River is generally comfortable for kayaking, canoeing, and rafting during the summer months, but care must be taken to prevent hypothermia by prolonged exposure to the cold river water.

As TVA also guarantees a minimum release schedule during the summer season for riverine recreation below the TVA Wilbur Dam, the Watauga River will draw commercial whitewater rafting companies from distant rivers ---such as the Nolichucky River running through Erwin, Tennessee in Unicoi County--- when lack of adequate summer rain fall will not allow for rafting trips on these naturally flowing rivers during seasonal droughts.

Climate of the Bee Cliff at Elizabethton, Tennessee
Month	Jan	Feb	Mar	Apr	May	Jun	Jul	Aug	Sep	Oct	Nov	Dec	Annual
Avg °F(°C)	34.0^{°F} 1.1^{°C}	37.4^{°F} 3.0^{°C}	47.2^{°F} 8.4^{°C}	55.2^{°F} 12.9^{°C}	63.4^{°F} 17.4^{°C}	71.1^{°F} 21.7^{°C}	74.4^{°F} 23.6^{°C}	73.6^{°F} 23.1^{°C}	67.9^{°F} 19.9^{°C}	56.7^{°F} 13.7^{°C}	47.0^{°F} 8.3^{°C}	38.2^{°F} 3.4^{°C}	55.5^{°F} 13.1^{°C}
Avg high °F(°C)	43.7^{°F} 6.5^{°C}	48.0^{°F} 8.9^{°C}	58.9^{°F} 14.9^{°C}	67.4^{°F} 19.7^{°C}	75.2^{°F} 24.0^{°C}	82.2^{°F} 27.9^{°C}	84.6^{°F} 29.2^{°C}	84.1^{°F} 28.9^{°C}	79.1^{°F} 26.2^{°C}	69.1^{°F} 20.6^{°C}	58.2^{°F} 14.6^{°C}	48.1^{°F} 8.9^{°C}	66.6^{°F} 19.2^{°C}
Avg low °F(°C)	24.3^{°F} -4.3^{°C}	26.8^{°F} -2.9^{°C}	35.4^{°F} 1.9^{°C}	43.0^{°F} 6.1^{°C}	51.6^{°F} 10.9^{°C}	59.9^{°F} 15.5^{°C}	64.1^{°F} 17.8^{°C}	63.1^{°F} 17.3^{°C}	56.6^{°F} 13.7^{°C}	44.2^{°F} 6.8^{°C}	35.9^{°F} 2.2^{°C}	28.2^{°F} -2.1^{°C}	44.4^{°F} 6.9^{°C}
Rain (inches)	3.2 in.	3.4 in.	3.7 in.	3.3 in.	3.8 in.	3.5 in.	4.3 in.	3.2 in.	3.3 in.	2.6 in.	2.9 in.	3.4 in.	40.7 in.
Snow (inches)	5.2 in.	4.2 in.	2.3 in.	0.4 in.	0.05 in.	0.05 in.	0.0 in.	0.0 in.	0.05 in.	0.0 in.	0.9 in.	2.6 in.	15.6 in.
Sources for Bee Cliff at Elizabethton (Bristol-Johnson City, Tennessee) climate statistics: climate-zone.com'

== Motion picture scene filmed at the Bee Cliff ==
During 1989, many scenes from the Chuck Norris action film Delta Force 2: The Colombian Connection were filmed at the Bee Cliff and other Carter County sites:

- Filmed in the Philippines, Elizabethton, Tennessee, and other various Carter County, Tennessee locations such as Buck Mountain and the Bee Cliff. The "Palace In The Sky" resort in Tagaytay was used as the setting for Ramon Cota's hideout. The interior set of the Cota's hideout (and the sets from many other interior scenes) from Delta Force 2 were actually constructed within the warehouse of former shampoo manufacturer in Elizabethton. Shampoo labels with an Elvis-like caricature for "Love Me Tender Shampoo" were found still attached to columns within the warehouse stage.
- A long shot showing the Colonel Scot McCoy character (played in the movie by Chuck Norris) climbing a towering cliff face in order to invade Ramon Cota's palace was filmed in the Philippines, but the accompanying close-up shot of McCoy pausing on the cliff face was actually shot at the river level base of the Bee Cliff with Norris and film crew aboard inflatable rafts while filming this close-up afloat on the Watauga River.

== See also ==
- Dragging Canoe
- Fort Watauga
- Overmountain Men
- Riverboarding
- River surfing
- Sycamore Shoals
- Watauga, Tennessee
