= Boone Dam =

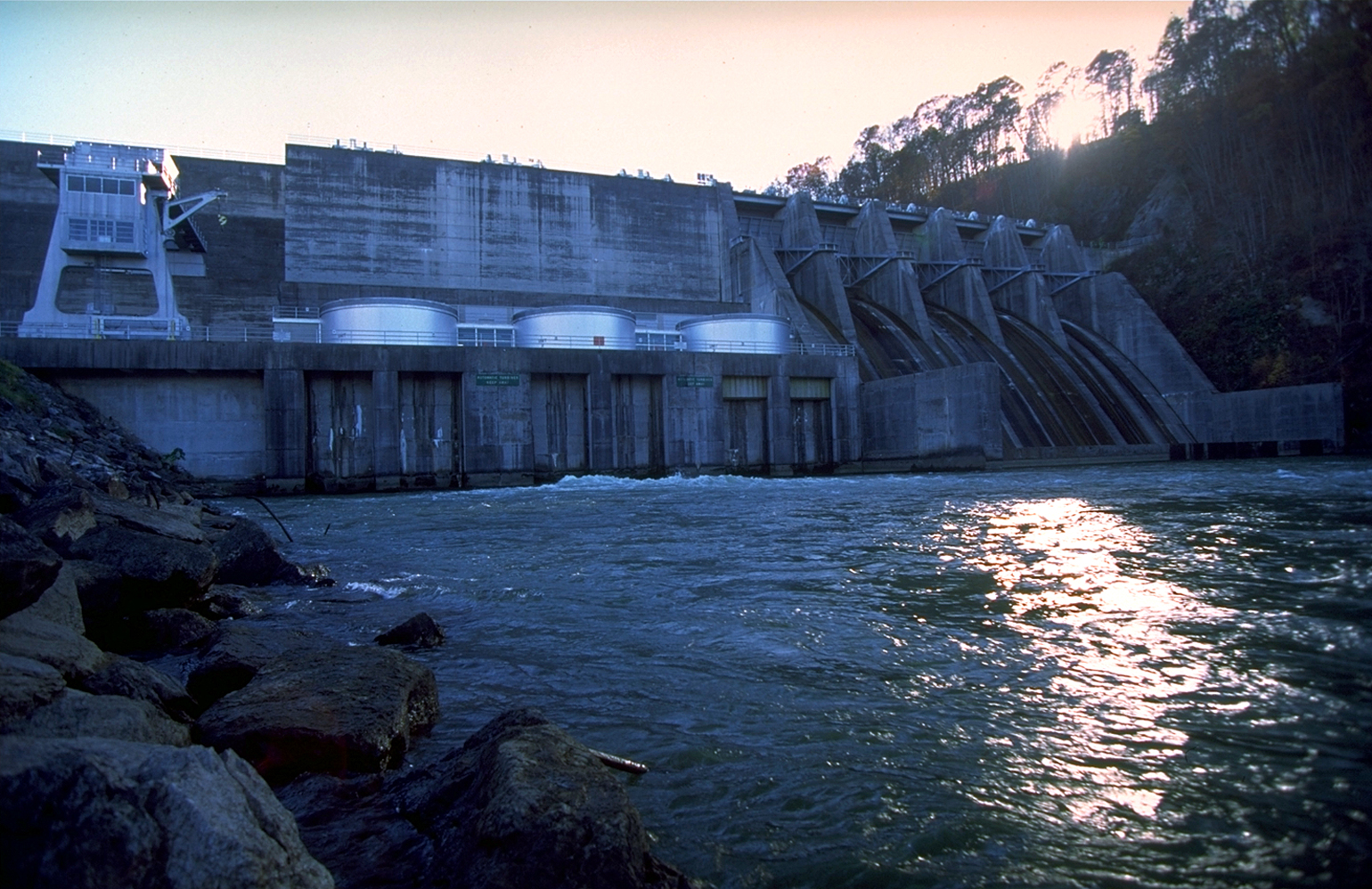
- Interactive map of Boone Dam
- Official name: Boone Dam
- Location: Sullivan County and Washington County, Tennessee, U.S.
- Coordinates: 36°26′24″N 82°26′16″W
- Construction began: August 29, 1950
- Opening date: December 16, 1952
- Operator: Tennessee Valley Authority

Dam and spillways
- Impounds: South Fork Holston River
- Height: 160 feet (49 m)
- Length: 1,532 feet (467 m)

Reservoir
- Creates: Boone Lake

Boone Dam is a hydroelectric and flood control dam on the South Fork Holston River on the border between Sullivan County and Washington County in the U.S. state of Tennessee. It is one of three dams on the South Fork Holston owned and operated by the Tennessee Valley Authority, which built the dam in the early 1950s as part of greater efforts to control flooding in the Tennessee River watershed. The dam impounds the 4,500-acre (1,800 ha) Boone Lake, and its tailwaters are part of Fort Patrick Henry Lake. The dam and associated infrastructure were listed on the National Register of Historic Places in 2017.

Boone Dam is named for frontiersman Daniel Boone (1734–1820), who was active in the general area in the 1760s.

== Location ==
Boone Dam is located 19 miles (31 km) above the South Fork Holston River's confluence with the North Fork Holston River (which forms the Holston River proper). The Watauga River joins the South Fork Holston almost immediately upstream from the dam, creating a V-shaped reservoir that extends for 17 miles (27 km) up the South Fork Holston (all the way to Bluff City) and for 15 miles (24 km) up the Watauga. The Sullivan-Washington county line follows the reservoir for most of its Watauga span. Boone Dam is 31 miles (50 km) downstream from South Holston Dam and 10 miles (16 km) upstream from Fort Patrick Henry Dam.

== Capacity ==
Boone Dam is a concrete gravity-type dam 160 feet (49 m) high and 1,532 feet (467 m) long, and has a generating capacity of 81,000 kilowatts. While the main section of the dam is a concrete structure, the northern half of the dam consists of a 750-foot (230 m) earth-and-fill structure that seals off the floodplain adjacent to the main river channel. The dam's overfall spillway has five radial gates with a combined maximum discharge of 137,000 cubic feet per second (3.9 dam^{3}/s). Boone Lake has 168 miles (270 km) of shoreline and a flood storage capacity of 75,829 acre-feet (93,534,000 m^{3}). The reservoir's operating levels vary by about 20 feet (6.1 m) in a typical year.

== Background and construction ==
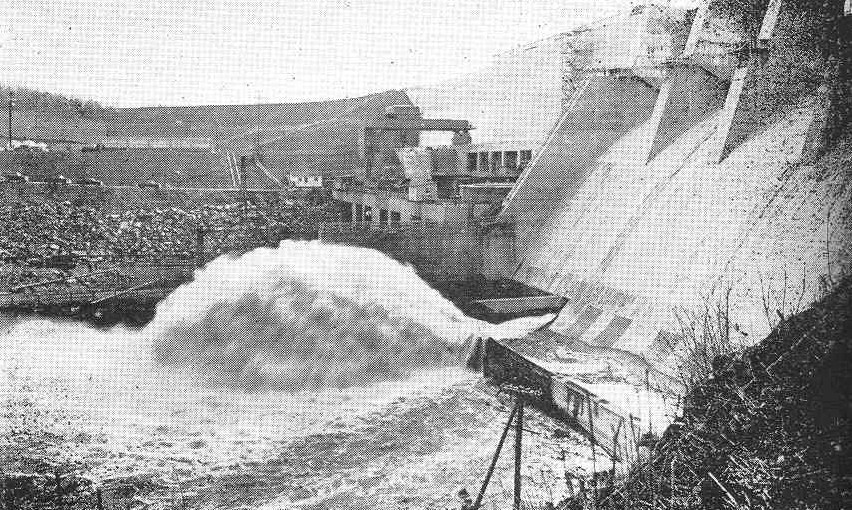
Water exiting one of Boone Dam's sluice gates

Both public and private entities were aware of the hydroelectric potential of the South Fork Holston River in the early 1900s, although other than Wilbur Dam (completed in 1912) on the river's Watauga River tributary, no major dam projects were attempted. In the 1920s, the Holston River Power Company surveyed the river basin with plans to build four dams, and identified the present Boone site (the company called it the "Bachman Ford" site). In the 1930s, when the Tennessee Valley Authority assumed oversight of flood control operations in the Tennessee River watershed, the agency suggested the Boone site (the agency originally called it the "Spurgeon Island" site) as a potential dam site. As Watauga Dam and South Holston Dam (further upstream) neared completion in the late 1940s, the Spurgeon Island site was the next logical step in development of the South Fork Holston. The project's primary purpose was to provide flood control in the region, especially for Kingsport (a few miles downstream), which had suffered major flood damage in 1901 and 1940. The dam would also add hydroelectricity to TVA's energy grid, which by 1950 had been maxed out by increasing demands from consumers and from Atomic Energy Commission facilities at Oak Ridge. Work on Boone Dam began August 29, 1950.

The construction of Boone Dam and its reservoir required the purchase of 5,160 acres (2,090 ha) of land, 1,363 acres (552 ha) of which had to be cleared. 152 families, 104 graves, and 18 miles (29 km) of roads had to be relocated, and three new bridges were built. The outbreak of the Korean War brought increased support from federal entities, and work progressed without interruption.

Boone Dam was completed and its gates closed December 16, 1952. The dam's first generator went online March 16, 1953, its second generator went online June 12, 1953, and the third went online September 3, 1953. The total cost of the Boone project was $27.7 million.

== Sinkhole ==
On October 20, 2014, during an informal inspection, a sinkhole was discovered at the toe of the dam that allowed water to seep through. Consequently, a decision was made to start lowering the water level in the lake earlier than normal as a cautionary measure.

In July 2015, a formal inspection of the dam revealed that Internal erosion was the cause of the seepage. A wide range of methods of repairing the dam were considered. It was estimated the repair would cost two hundred to three hundred million dollars. A composite seepage barrier was the preferred option. After impact studies were conducted, work began on the dam in 2016, and construction was performed and completed in 3 stages. Boone Dam was reopened on May 25, 2022.
