= Tennessee State Route 390 =

State highway in Tennessee, United States

State Route 390
- TN 390 highlighted in red

Route information
- Maintained by TDOT
- Length: 2.6 mi (4.2 km)

Major junctions
- South end: SR 44 in Bluff City
- North end: US 11E / US 19 / SR 394 in Bristol

Location
- Country: United States
- State: Tennessee
- Counties: Sullivan

Highway system
- Tennessee State Routes; Interstate; US; State
← SR 389	→ SR 391

State Route 390 (SR 390) is a state highway in the cities of Bluff City and Bristol in Sullivan County, Tennessee.

== Route description ==
SR 390 begins at SR 44 in Bluff City and goes north and cross over the South Fork Holston River and Boone Lake. It continues north to SR 394 and turns left to become concurrent with it before coming to an end at an interchange with US 11E/US 19. SR 394 continues straight.

== Junction list ==
The entire route is in Sullivan County.

Location	mi	km	Destinations	Notes
Bluff City	0	0.0	SR 44 (Bluff City Highway/Fleming Drive) – Johnson City, Downtown Bluff City	Southern terminus
Bluff City	0.4	0.64	Silver Grove Road – South Holston Dam	Intersection with Traffic light
Bristol	2.3	3.7	SR 394 east – Bristol	Southern end of SR 394 concurrency
Bristol	2.6	4.2	US 11E / US 19 (SR 34 / Volunteer Parkway) / SR 394 west – Bristol, Johnson City, Blountville	Northern terminus
1.000 mi = 1.609 km; 1.000 km = 0.621 mi: Concurrency terminus
