= Alvarado, Virginia =

Alvarado
- Unincorporated community
- Location within Virginia
- Coordinates: 36°38′59.87″N 81°53′12.27″W
- Country: United States
- State: Virginia
- County: Washington
- Time zone: UTC-5 (Eastern (EST))
  - Summer (DST): UTC-4 (EDT)

Alvarado is an unincorporated community in Washington County, in the U.S. state of Virginia. It is located along the South Fork Holston River on the north end of South Holston Lake, southwest of Osceola. It is part of the Virginia Creeper National Recreation Trail.
