= Watauga, Tennessee =

Watauga
- City
- Location of Watauga in Carter County, Tennessee.
- Coordinates: 36°22′2″N 82°17′29″W
- Country: United States
- State: Tennessee
- Counties: Carter, Washington
- Incorporated: 1960
- Named for: Cherokee word for "beautiful river"

Area
  - Total: 0.90 sq mi (2.33 km^{2})
  - Land: 0.87 sq mi (2.26 km^{2})
  - Water: 0.027 sq mi (0.07 km^{2})
- Elevation: 1,453 ft (443 m)

Population (2020)
  - Total: 353
  - Density: 404.4/sq mi (156.13/km^{2})
- Time zone: UTC-5 (Eastern (EST))
  - Summer (DST): UTC-4 (EDT)
- ZIP code: 37694
- Area code: 423
- FIPS code: 47-78240
- GNIS feature ID: 1327319

Watauga /wəˈtɔːɡə/ is a city in Carter and Washington counties in the U.S. state of Tennessee. The population 353 in the 2020 census. It is part of the Johnson City Metropolitan Statistical Area, which is a component of the Johnson City-Kingsport-Bristol, TN-VA Combined Statistical Area – commonly known as the "Tri-Cities" region.

== History ==
Some of the earliest European pioneers in Tennessee settled in the vicinity of Watauga in the mid-18th century. William Bean, traditionally recognized as Tennessee's first white settler, built his cabin at the mouth of Boone Creek, 7 miles (11 km) downstream from modern Watauga, in 1769. The Watauga Association, an early frontier government, operated out of nearby Elizabethton in the 1770s.

When the East Tennessee and Virginia Railroad (ET&V) was built in the 1850s, a railroad stop known as Carter's Depot, or Carter's Station, was established at what is now Watauga, where a trestle had been erected to carry the tracks across the Watauga River. Carter's Depot consisted of a water tank, several storage buildings, a telegraph office, and a post office.

The trestle at Carter's Depot held immense strategic importance during the Civil War, as the ET&V was part of a vital supply line connecting Virginia with the rest of the South. The trestle was among those targeted by the East Tennessee bridge burnings in November 1861, though the conspirators found it too heavily guarded by Confederates. In late December 1862, General Samuel P. Carter conducted a raid into the region, overwhelming the Confederate detachment at Carter's Depot before destroying the trestle. On October 1, 1864, a skirmish took place at Carter's Depot, with Union forces under General Alvan C. Gillem pushing Confederates led by John C. Vaughn across the river.

== Geography ==
Watauga is located along the Watauga River, at the headwaters of Boone Lake, approximately 18 miles (29 km) river miles above the river's confluence with the South Fork Holston River. The city's downtown area is located in Carter County, though its municipal boundaries extend into adjacent Washington County. Johnson City is located 5 miles (8 km) to the southwest, and Elizabethton is 5 miles (8 km) to the southeast.

According to the United States Census Bureau, the city has a total area of 0.83 square miles (2.15 km^{2}), of which 0.81 square miles (2.11 km^{2}) is land and 0.02 square miles (0.05 km^{2}), or 2.11%, is water.

== Demographics ==
Historical population
Census	Pop.	Note	%±
1970	314		—
1980	376		19.7%
1990	389		3.5%
2000	403		3.6%
2010	458		13.6%
2020	353		−22.9%

=== 2020 census ===
As of the 2020 census, Watauga had a population of 353. The median age was 46.7 years. 18.7% of residents were under the age of 18 and 22.7% of residents were 65 years of age or older. For every 100 females there were 105.2 males, and for every 100 females age 18 and over there were 103.5 males age 18 and over.

0.0% of residents lived in urban areas, while 100.0% lived in rural areas.

There were 135 households in Watauga, of which 31.1% had children under the age of 18 living in them. Of all households, 43.7% were married-couple households, 20.7% were households with a male householder and no spouse or partner present, and 31.1% were households with a female householder and no spouse or partner present. About 28.9% of all households were made up of individuals and 14.9% had someone living alone who was 65 years of age or older.

There were 161 housing units, of which 16.1% were vacant. The homeowner vacancy rate was 2.7% and the rental vacancy rate was 5.7%.

Racial composition as of the 2020 census
Race	Number	Percent
White	334	94.6%
Black or African American	0	0.0%
American Indian and Alaska Native	2	0.6%
Asian	0	0.0%
Native Hawaiian and Other Pacific Islander	0	0.0%
Some other race	1	0.3%
Two or more races	16	4.5%
Hispanic or Latino (of any race)	4	1.1%

=== 2000 census ===
As of the 2000 census, there was a population of 403, with 162 households and 111 families residing in the city. The population density was 551.5 inhabitants per square mile (212.9/km^{2}). There were 181 housing units at an average density of 247.7 per square mile (95.6/km^{2}). The racial makeup of the city was 98.01% White, 1.74% African American, and 0.25% from two or more races. Hispanic or Latino of any race were 1.24% of the population.

There were 162 households, out of which 27.8% had children under the age of 18 living with them, 53.1% were married couples living together, 10.5% had a female householder with no husband present, and 30.9% were non-families. 23.5% of all households were made up of individuals, and 11.1% had someone living alone who was 65 years of age or older. The average household size was 2.49 and the average family size was 2.97.

In the city, the population was spread out, with 23.1% under the age of 18, 9.4% from 18 to 24, 31.0% from 25 to 44, 23.6% from 45 to 64, and 12.9% who were 65 years of age or older. The median age was 37 years. For every 100 females, there were 92.8 males. For every 100 females age 18 and over, there were 93.8 males.

The median income for a household in the city was $28,438, and the median income for a family was $36,429. Males had a median income of $26,875 versus $17,727 for females. The per capita income for the city was $13,551. About 11.0% of families and 18.1% of the population were below the poverty line, including 36.1% of those under age 18 and 10.4% of those age 65 or over.

== Education ==
The portion in Carter County is in the Carter County School District.

The portion in Washington County is in the Washington County School District.
