= South Holston Dam =

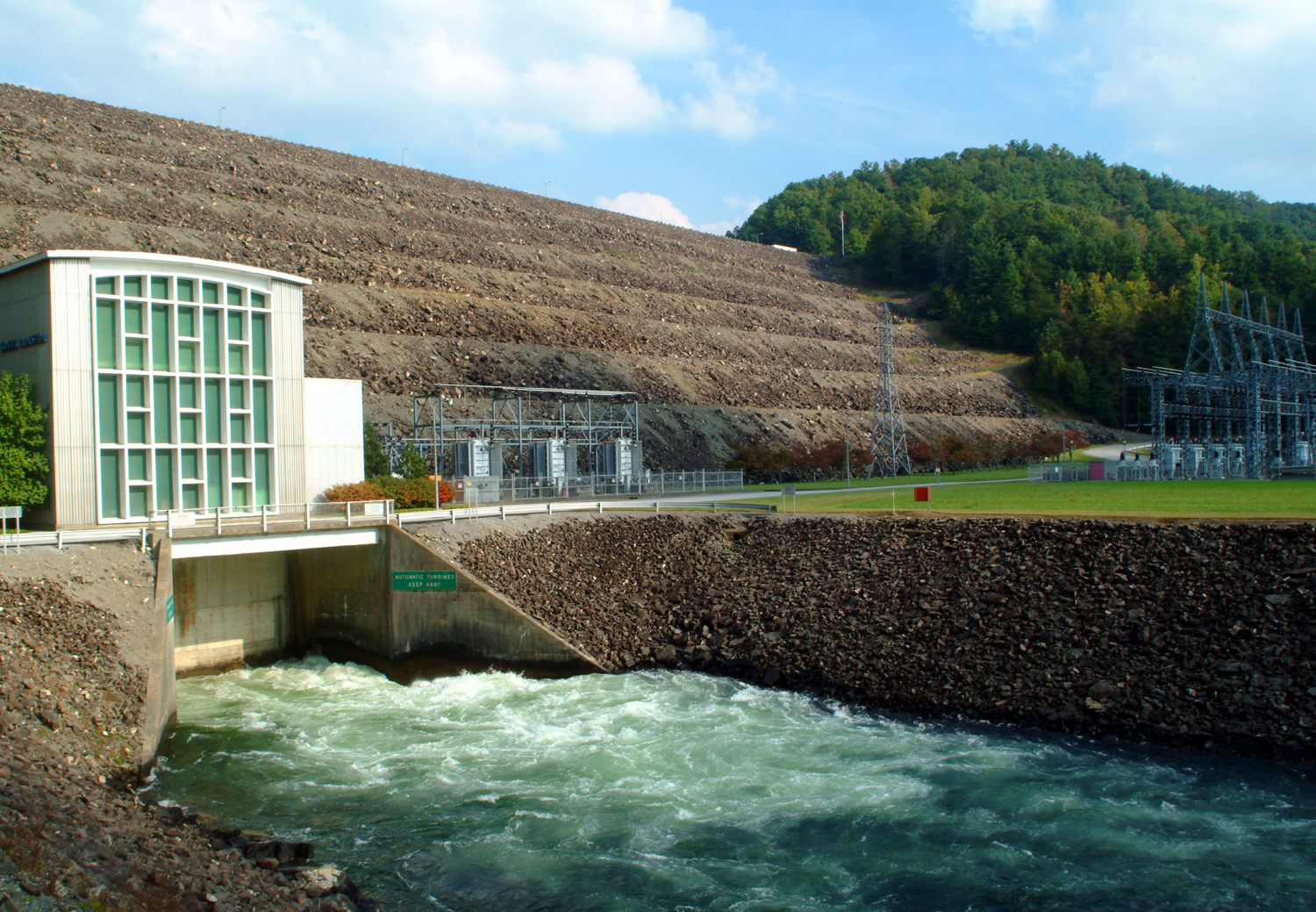
- South Holston Dam

- Location within Tennessee
- Official name: South Holston Dam
- Location: Sullivan County, Tennessee, U.S.
- Coordinates: 36°31′24″N 82°5′20″W
- Construction began: February 16, 1942
- Opening date: November 20, 1950
- Operator: Tennessee Valley Authority

Dam and spillways
- Impounds: South Fork Holston River
- Height: 285 feet (87 m)
- Length: 1,600 feet (490 m)

Reservoir
- Creates: South Holston Lake
- Total capacity: 765,000 acre⋅ft (944,000 dam^{3})

Power Station
- Commission date: 1950
- Turbines: 1 x 38.5 MW Francis-type
- Installed capacity: 38.5 MW

South Holston Dam is a hydroelectric and flood control dam on the South Fork Holston River in Sullivan County, in the U.S. state of Tennessee. It is the uppermost of three dams on the South Fork Holston owned and operated by the Tennessee Valley Authority, which built the dam in the 1940s as part of efforts to control flooding in the Tennessee River watershed. On October 21, 1950 the valve gate closed and water began backing up to create South Holston Reservoir. Work began on the dam in December 1941, but in November 1942, the War Production Board requested that the operation be suspended because of a shortage of critical materials. Work did not resume until July 1, 1947. The dam now impounds the South Holston Lake of 7,550 acres (3,060 ha), which extends northeastward across the Tennessee-Virginia state line.

== Location ==
South Holston Dam is located 50 miles (80 km) above the South Fork Holston River's confluence with the North Fork Holston River (which forms the Holston River proper). The dam site is situated in an area where the river descends out of the Appalachian Mountains and enters the upper Holston Valley. The dam and the Tennessee half of its reservoir are surrounded by the Cherokee National Forest, and the Virginia half of the reservoir is surrounded by the Jefferson National Forest. The reservoir includes parts of Sullivan County in Tennessee and Washington County in Virginia. The city of Bristol straddles the Tennessee-Virginia border a few miles northwest of South Holston Dam.

== Capacity ==
South Holston Dam is an earth-and-rock dam 285 feet (87 m) high and 1,600 feet (490 m) long, and has a generating capacity of 38,500 kilowatts. The dam's fixed-crest morning glory spillway has a maximum discharge of 116,200 cubic feet per second (3,290 m^{3}/s). South Holston Lake extends northeastward for 24 miles (39 km) into southwestern Virginia, with 168 miles (270 km) of shoreline and a storage capacity of 765,000 acre⋅ft (944,000 dam^{3}), of which 252,757 acre⋅ft (311,771 dam^{3}) is reserved for flood control. The reservoir's operating levels vary by about 23 feet (7.0 m) in a typical year.

The dam has two intakes, one at the north end and one at the south end. The north intake transfers water from the reservoir via high-pressure conduit to the powerhouse at the northern base of the dam. The south intake feeds water into the dam's spillway, from which it travels through a sluiceway to a stilling basin at the southern base of the dam.

== Background and construction ==
Various private entities had investigated the South Fork Holston's hydroelectric potential since the early 1900s, although other than Wilbur Dam on the river's Watauga River tributary, no major projects had been initiated. In the 1920s, the Holston River Power Company conducted a massive survey of the South Fork Holston's watershed with plans to build four dams on the river, including one at the present South Holston Dam site. After the Tennessee Valley Authority gained oversight of the Tennessee River watershed in the following decade, it proposed the construction of two dams in the South Fork Holston basin— one at the South Holston Dam site and the other at Cardens Bluff (modern Watauga Dam). The primary purpose for building these two dams was flood control, especially in light of a disastrous flood in 1940 that had destroyed several structures in Bluff City and Kingsport, both downstream from the proposed dam sites. The dams would also produce electricity to help TVA meet the high demand for power at the outbreak of World War II. South Holston Dam and its sister project, Watauga Dam, were authorized on December 17, 1941, and work began on February 16 of the following year.

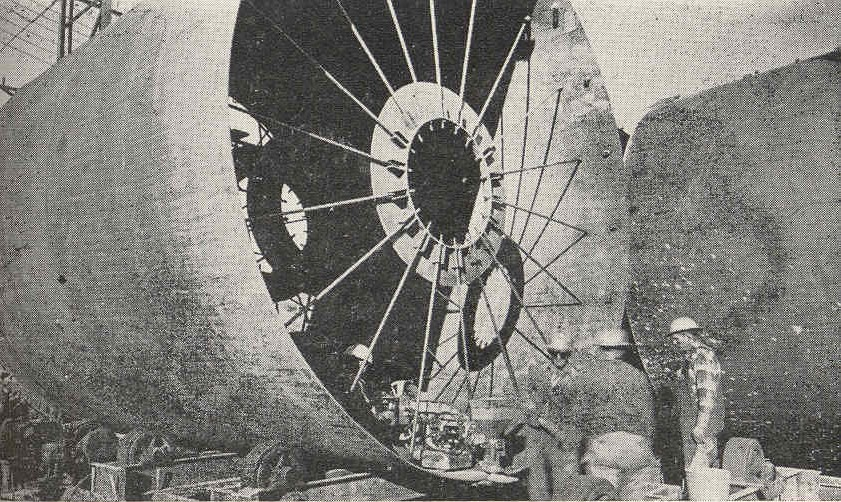
Welding work on the steel seams of South Holston's power conduit, circa 1940s

The construction of South Holston Dam and its reservoir required the purchase of 12,860 acres (52 km^{2}) of land, 3,875 acres (1,568 ha) of which had to be cleared. The construction moved 342 families and 559 graves. It required the relocation of 30.5 miles (49.1 km) of roads, and four new bridges were built. In October 1942, the U.S. War Production Board ordered a halt to the South Holston and Watauga projects, claiming they were not vital to the nation's war effort. TVA spent several weeks securing the dam sites, and the South Holston project was stalled until the end of the war. Work on South Holston began again on August 4, 1947, as Watauga neared completion.

Along with the main dam, the South Holston project required the construction of a saddle dam approximately 4 miles (6.4 km) north of the main dam at the reservoir's Painter Spring embayment. The saddle dam is 40 feet (12 m) high and 3,400 feet (1,000 m) long. The project also necessitated the construction of an auxiliary spillway, since the main dam's morning glory spillway had not been adequately tested. This auxiliary spillway— known as the "Bent Branch Spillway" after the stream into which it empties— is located about 1.5 miles (2.4 km) south of the main dam.

South Holston Dam was completed and its gates closed November 20, 1950. The dam's generator went online February 13, 1951. The total cost of the South Holston project was just over $31 million. Being one of the TVA's top plants in the area, it went from producing 49 megawatts of energy to only 42. After 65 years of operation, the dam was in need of a modernization in terms of energy production. TVA upgraded the powerhouse controls and power equipment. There was a warehouse on site and pre-outages in the time leading up to the project in the surrounding area. The road in relation to the dam remained closed for one year but the recreational areas were not affected

== Weir Dam (1991) ==
In 1991, TVA built a weir dam, an aerating labrynth weir, approximately 1.5 miles below the main dam, straddling the midsection of Osceola Island. The weir helps to deal with the fact that the water coming out of the bottom of the dam is cold, dense, and oxygen depleted. The water also tends to have unpredictable recirculation currents. The weir counteracts these problems with the water out of the bottom of the dam. The weir oxygenates the water, which helps aquatic insects, vegetation, and fish—particularly bass and trout. The weir also prevents the water from refluxing back up to the turbine at the dam, and calms it down for recreational users such as those boating, fishing, and swimming.
