= Holston River =

River in Tennessee, United States

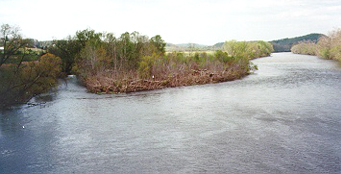
- The North Fork of the Holston River near Weber City, Virginia.

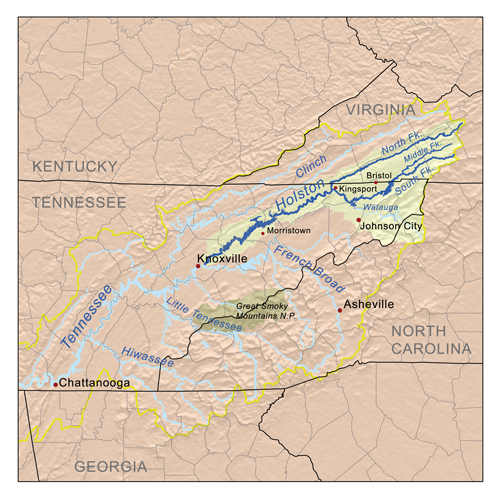

Location
- Country: United States
- State: Virginia, Tennessee

Physical characteristics
- Source: North Fork Holston River
  - location: Bland County, Virginia
  - coordinates: 37°03′51″N 81°16′15″W
  - elevation: 2,880 ft (880 m)
- 2nd source: South Fork Holston River
  - location: Smyth County, Virginia
  - coordinates: 36°46′11″N 81°22′04″W
  - elevation: 2,900 ft (880 m)
- 3rd source
  - location: Kingsport, Tennessee
  - coordinates: 36°32′51″N 82°36′44″W
  - elevation: 1,158 ft (353 m)
- Mouth: Tennessee River
  - location: Knoxville, Tennessee
  - coordinates: 35°57′33″N 83°51′0″W
  - elevation: 814 ft (248 m)
- Length: 136 mi (219 km)
- Basin size: 3,776 sq mi (9,780 km^{2})
- Discharge
  - location: J. Will Taylor Bridge (Hwy. 70) near Knoxville, Tennessee, 5.5 miles (8.9 km) above the mouth(mean for water years 1931–1975, 1979-1983)
  - average: 4,759 cu ft/s (134.8 m^{3}/s)(mean for water years 1931–1975, 1979-1983)
  - minimum: 44 cu ft/s (1.2 m^{3}/s)December 1941
  - maximum: 62,900 cu ft/s (1,780 m^{3}/s)March 1935

Basin features
- River system: Tennessee → Ohio → Mississippi

The Holston River is a 136-mile (219 km) river that flows from Kingsport, Tennessee, to Knoxville, Tennessee. Along with its three major forks (North Fork, Middle Fork and South Fork), it comprises a major river system that drains much of northeastern Tennessee, southwestern Virginia, and northwestern North Carolina. The Holston's confluence with the French Broad River at Knoxville marks the beginning of the Tennessee River.

== History ==
Maps by early French explorers in this area identified what is now known as the Holston River as the "Cherokee River", after the tribe they encountered. The United States settlers and army fought with the Cherokee over land in Tennessee, North Carolina, and further South into Georgia and Alabama. In the 1830s the government forced the Cherokee out on the Trail of Tears to Indian Territory (now Oklahoma), under the authority of the Indian Removal Act passed by Congress in 1830.

Early Tennessee historian and Tennessee Supreme Court Justice John Haywood cites in his 1823 book "The civil and political history of the state of Tennessee from its earliest settlement up to the year 1796, including the boundaries of the state" that the Holston River was identified and named on earlier produced French maps as the "Cherokee River". British colonists later named the Holston River after pioneer Stephen Holstein, a European-American settler who built a cabin in 1746 on the upper reaches of the river. Similarly, Holston Mountain was named after the Holston River.

The North Fork of the river was polluted by the "Muck Dam" break in Saltville, Virginia on December 24, 1924, which allowed the release of a huge volume of liquid chemical waste stored there by the Mathieson Alkali Company, taking the lives of nineteen people who lived along the river. The river remained polluted and virtually dead for several decades afterward.

== Course ==
The North Fork flows 138 miles (222 km) southwest from Sharon Springs in Bland County, Virginia. The Middle Fork flows 56.5 miles (90.9 km) from near the western border of Wythe County, Virginia, joining the South Fork in Washington County, Virginia, southeast of Abingdon. The South Fork rises near Sugar Grove in Smyth County and flows 112 miles (180 km) southwest to join the North Fork at Kingsport. The Watauga River, a tributary of the South Fork Holston, flows 78.5 miles (126.3 km) westward from Watauga County, North Carolina.

== River modifications ==
The Holston River valley has been greatly developed for electrical power generation, both with hydroelectric dams and coal-fired steam plants. In the upper reaches, some of these plants are controlled by private interests; in the downstream portion, they are owned by the United States Government's Tennessee Valley Authority.

The main stem of the Holston is impounded by the Tennessee Valley Authority's Cherokee Dam near Jefferson City, Tennessee, forming Cherokee Lake. Five other dams, also managed by TVA, impound the Holston's headwater streams: Watauga Dam and Wilbur Dam on the Watauga River, and Boone Dam, Fort Patrick Henry Dam, and South Holston Dam on the South Fork Holston River.

Among the dams and associated reservoirs on the South Fork Holston River are Boone Dam and Boone Lake, named for the explorer Daniel Boone; Fort Patrick Henry Dam and Fort Patrick Henry Lake, named for the Founding Father Patrick Henry; and South Holston Dam and South Holston Lake.

== Recreation ==
All three forks in Virginia, South Holston Lake, and the Holston River in Tennessee below the South Holston Dam offer relatively easy-to-reach recreation opportunities. The North Fork in Virginia is known as an excellent smallmouth bass river (because of mercury contamination, fish caught in the North Fork of the Holston below Saltville, Virginia, must not be consumed). Both the South Fork in Virginia and the first 20 miles (32 km) of the Holston in Tennessee below South Holston Dam are quality brown trout and rainbow trout fisheries. The Holston River is wide and open enough to allow extensive fly fishing. South Holston Lake offers a variety of fishing opportunity as well, as it contains smallmouth bass, common carp, walleye, pike, sunfish, crappie and a few trout.

== Crossings ==
=== Holston River ===
The following is a list of major road crossings on the Holston River:

Bridge Name	Crossing/Road	Location	Notes
Boyds Bridge	Boyds Bridge Pike/Strawberry Plains Pike	Knoxville, Tennessee	First road crossing over the Holston
Holston River Bridge	I-40	Knoxville	
J.W. Will Taylor Memorial Bridge	US 11E / US 25W / US 70 (SR 9/SR 168/Asheville Highway)	Knoxville, Tennessee	
Mascot Bridge	Mascot Road	Mascot/Strawberry Plains, Tennessee	Concrete arch bridge
John K. Shields Bridge	SR 92	Near Jefferson City, Tennessee	
Olen R. Marshall Bridge	US 25E (SR 32/Davy Crockett Parkway)	Morristown/Bean Station, Tennessee	The Olen R. Marshall Bridge is one of two bridges to cross Cherokee Lake
Melinda Ferry Bridge	SR 344 (Melinda Ferry Road)	near Rogersville, Tennessee	
Hugh B. Day Bridge	SR 66 / SR 70	near Rogersville and Persia, Tennessee	
William L. Jenkins Bridge	SR 347 (Burem Pike)	near Rogersville	
Longs Bend Bridge	Longs Bend Pike	Surgoinsville, Tennessee	Original bridge was demolished in 2014.
	Goshen Valley Road	Church Hill, Tennessee	Bridge does not have a name; final crossing over the main Holston River

=== South Fork Holston River ===
The following is a list of major road crossings on the South Fork Holston River:

Bridge Name	Crossing/Road	Location	Notes
C.P. Edwards Bridge	Ridgefields Road	Kingsport, Tennessee	
	I-26 / US 23	Kingsport, Tennessee	Two sets of bridges over the river, connected by the Long Island of the Holston
	SR 126 (S Wilcox Drive)	Kingsport, Tennessee	Two bridges over the river, connected by the Long Island of the Holston
	2nd Street	Kingsport, Tennessee	Connects Long Island of the Holston to the mainland
	S Eastman Road / Ivory Street	Kingsport, Tennessee	Closed Bridge at Long Island of the Holston
	Jared Drive	Kingsport, Tennessee	Connects Long Island of the Holston to the mainland
	13th Street	Kingsport, Tennessee	Connects Long Island of the Holston to the mainland
Sgt. 1st Class O.B. Hickman Memorial Bridge	SR 93 (S John B. Dennis Highway)	Kingsport, Tennessee	
J Mack Ray Bridge	SR 36 (Fort Henry Drive)	Kingsport, Tennessee	Directly beside of Fort Patrick Henry Dam; Concrete arch on southbound span
	Fall Creek Road	Warriors' Path State Park	No name bridge
	I-81	Colonial Heights, Tennessee	
Orville Depew "Dick" Kitzmiller and Riley Lee Milhorn Memorial Bridge	SR 75	Spurgeon, Tennessee	Just a half mile west of Boone Dam
Devault Bridge	Devault Bridge Road	Halfway between Blountville and Piney Flats, Tennessee	
Marine PFC Charles Howard Duty Memorial Bridge	Enterprise Road / Beaver Creek Road	Near Bluff City, Tennessee	
Charlie Worley Bridge	US 11E / US 19 (SR 34)	Bluff City, Tennessee	
Reed H. Thomas Memorial Bridge	SR 390	Bluff City, Tennessee	
	SR 358	Near Hickory Tree, Tennessee	No name bridge
Webb Bridge	Old Weaver Pike	Near Hickory Tree, Tennessee	
PVT. Lawrence E. Carrier Memorial Bridge	SR 44	Hickory Tree, Tennessee	
SSGTs. James B. White, Robert S. Shoaf, and Marvin H. Helbert Memorial Bridge	Holston View Dam Road	Emmett, Tennessee	Last crossing before South Holston Dam
421 Bridge	US 421 (SR 34)	Holston Valley, Tennessee	
	SR 670 (Green Springs Church Road / Denton Valley Road)	Green Spring, Virginia	No name bridge
	SR 710 (Alvarado Road)	Alvarado, Virginia	No name bridge
	US 58	Halfway between Osceola and Damascus, Virginia	No name bridge
	SR 719 (McCann Road)	Near Damascus, Virginia	No name bridge
	SR 91	Near Damascus, Virginia	No name bridge
	SR 724 (Beech Grove Road)	near Lodi, Virginia	No name bridge
Bucks Bridge	SR 731 (Bucks Bridge Road)	Between Lodi and Widener Valley, Virginia	
	SR 875 (Little Rock Road)	Friendship, Virginia	No name bridge
	SR 604 (Bishop Road)	Wilkinson's Mill, Virginia	No name bridge
Elswick Bridge	SR 649 (Elswick Bridge Road)	Wilkinson's Mill, Virginia	
	SR 600 (Whitetop Road)	Near Chilhowie, Virginia	No name bridge
Edward "Bud" Ashby Memorial Bridge	SR 645 (Red Stone Road)	Near Chilhowie, Virginia	
Hiler Bridge	SR 648 (Hiler Bridge Road)	near Adwolfe, Virginia	
	SR 604 (Red Stone Road)	Adwolfe, Virginia	No name bridge
Tilleys Bridge	SR 658 (Tilleys Bridge Road)	Adwolfe, Virginia	
Thomas Bridge	SR 657 (Thomas Bridge Road)	Stony Battery, Virginia	
	SR 709 (Deans Branch)	Stony Battery, Virginia	No name bridge
	SR 670 (Teas Road)	near Sugar Grove, Virginia	3 different bridges
	SR 674 (Sand Mines Road)	Sugar Grove, Virginia	No name bridge
	SR 16	Sugar Grove, Virginia	No name bridge

=== Middle Fork Holston River ===
The following is a list of major road crossings on the Middle Fork Holston River:

Bridge Name	Crossing/Road	Location	Notes
	US 58	Between Ashleys and Osceola, Virginia	No name bridge
	SR 803 (Rivermount Drive)	Near Lodi, Virginia	No name bridge
	SR 91	Between Lodi and Glade Spring, Virginia	No name bridge
Prices Bridge	SR 714 (Prices Bridge Road)	Price Hill, Virginia	
	I-81	Chilhowie, Virginia	No name bridge
	SR 107	Chilhowie, Virginia	No name bridge
	SR 638 (Tattle Branch Road)	Chilhowie, Virginia	No name bridge
Pioneer Memorial Bridge	US 11	Seven Mile Ford, Virginia	
	SR 645 (Fox Valley Road)	Seven Mile Ford, Virginia	No name bridge
	SR 659 (Old Ebenezer Road)	McMullin, Virginia	No name bridge
	Country Club Road	Marion, Virginia	No name bridge
L.W. Kelly Bridge	Baughman Avenue	Marion, Virginia	
	N Church Street	Marion, Virginia	No name bridge
W.E. Francis Bridge	Chatham Hill Road	Marion, Virginia	
	E Church Street	Marion, Virginia	No name bridge
	US 11 / SR 16	Marion, Virginia	No name bridge
	SR 691 (Johnstone Road)	Marion, Virginia	No name bridge
	US 11	Marion, Virginia	No name bridge
	SR 689 (Snider Branch Road)	Near Atkins, Virginia	No name bridge
	SR 622 (Bear Creek Road)	Atkins, Virginia	No name bridge
	SR 626 (Ole Hickory Lane)	Atkins, Virginia	No name bridge

== See also ==
- List of Tennessee rivers
- List of Virginia rivers
