= Warriors' Path State Park =

State park in Tennessee, United States

Warriors' Path State Park, Tennessee
- IUCN category III (natural monument or feature)
- Location within Tennessee
- Location: Kingsport, Sullivan County, Tennessee, United States
- Nearest city: Kingsport, Tennessee
- Coordinates: 36°29′29″N 82°29′02″W
- Area: 950 acres (3.8 km^{2})
- Established: 1952
- Governing body: Tennessee Department of Environment and Conservation
- Website: Warriors' Path State Park

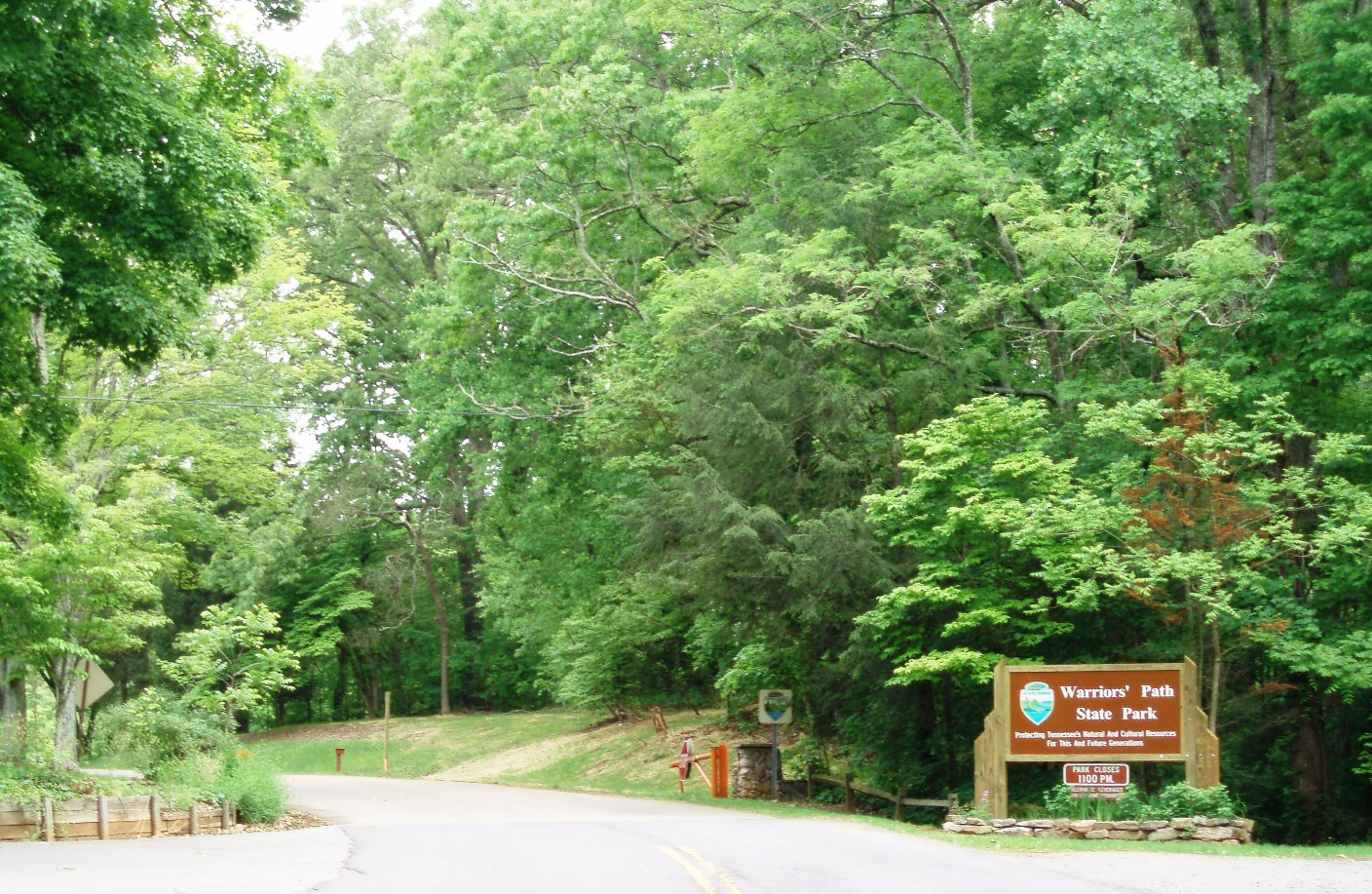
The main entrance to Warriors' Path State Park.

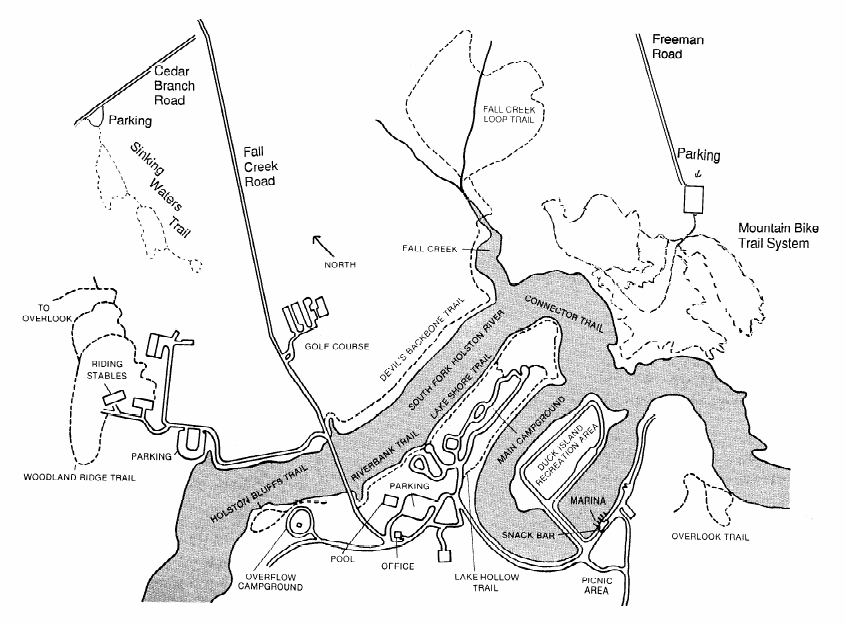
Map of Warriors' Path State Park showing trails.

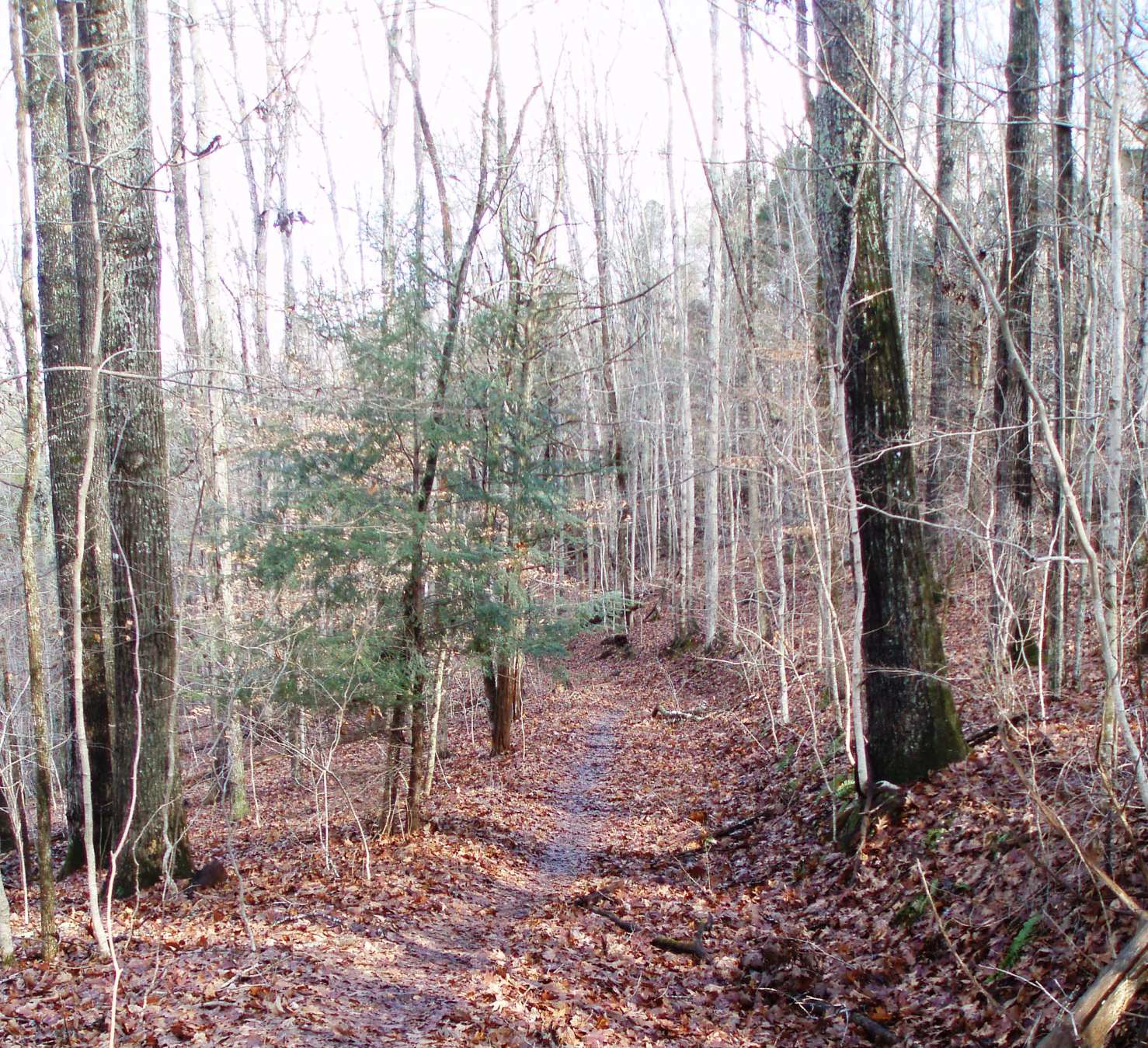
View down one of the hiking trails in Autumn.

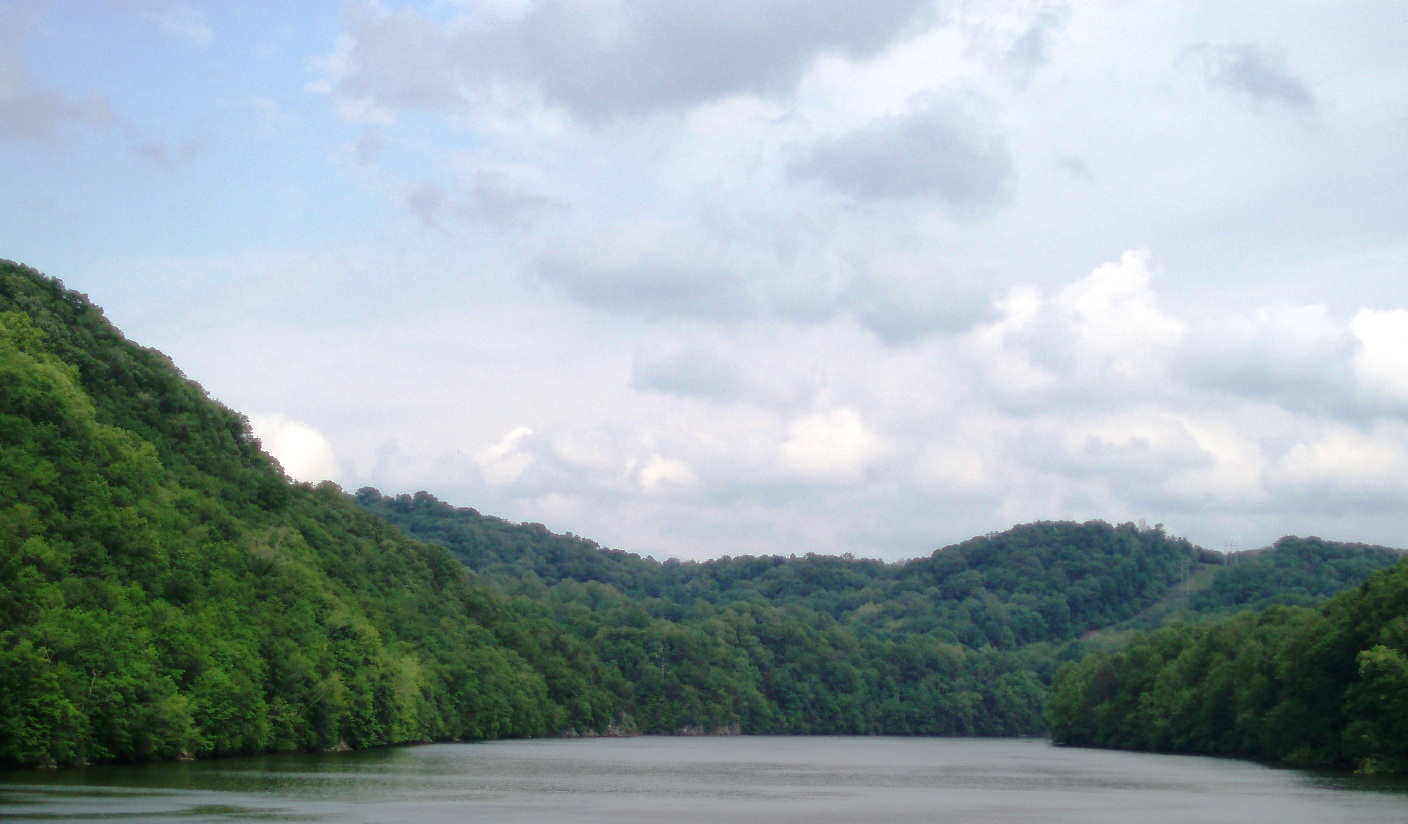
Fort Patrick Henry Lake.

Warriors' Path State Park is a 950-acre (3.84 km^{2}) Tennessee State Park in Colonial Heights, Tennessee, an area within the city of Kingsport. It is named after the Great Indian Warpath that was used by the Haudenosaunee in war raids with the Cherokee and other tribes. The park is located around the Fort Patrick Henry Reservoir and Duck Island on the South Fork Holston River. This land was acquired from the Tennessee Valley Authority in 1952.

== Park activities and amenities ==
=== Trails ===
The park offers a variety of trails available for hiking, biking, and horseback riding. Hiking trails travel through forests and wetlands and range from paved, accessible paths to strenuous climbs. There are also over 8 miles (13 km) of mountain biking trails. Horseback riding trails are available to both independent riders and those interested in guided walks. Stables offer a selection of riding horses and ponies as well as a place for owners to board their horses. Several historic settlements and houses can be seen along the trails.

=== Aquatics ===
A marina on Patrick Henry Reservoir offers boat slips, canoes, kayaks and paddle boats for rent, as well as a gift shop and snack bar.

Several public use ramps are available to visitors. Common fish in the lake include crappie, trout, catfish, bream, and bass.

=== Campgrounds ===
The main campground offers 90 campsites, each with tables, grills, water, and electrical hookups. A nearby overflow campground open from Memorial Day to Labor Day contains an additional 40 sites with tables and grills. Campgrounds include bathhouses and dumping stations.

=== Golf ===
The Warriors' Path Golf Course is an 18-hole par 72 course on the shores of the Patrick Henry Lake. The course was designed by George Cobb and opened in 1972. Facilities include a driving range, practice green, and practice bunker.

=== Other facilities ===
The park has many picnic tables and several pavilions that are available for rent. An accessible playground is open to children of all abilities. Tennis courts, soccer fields, and a 27-hole disc golf course are free to use.
