= Watauga River =

River in the United States of America

Watauga River Watoga
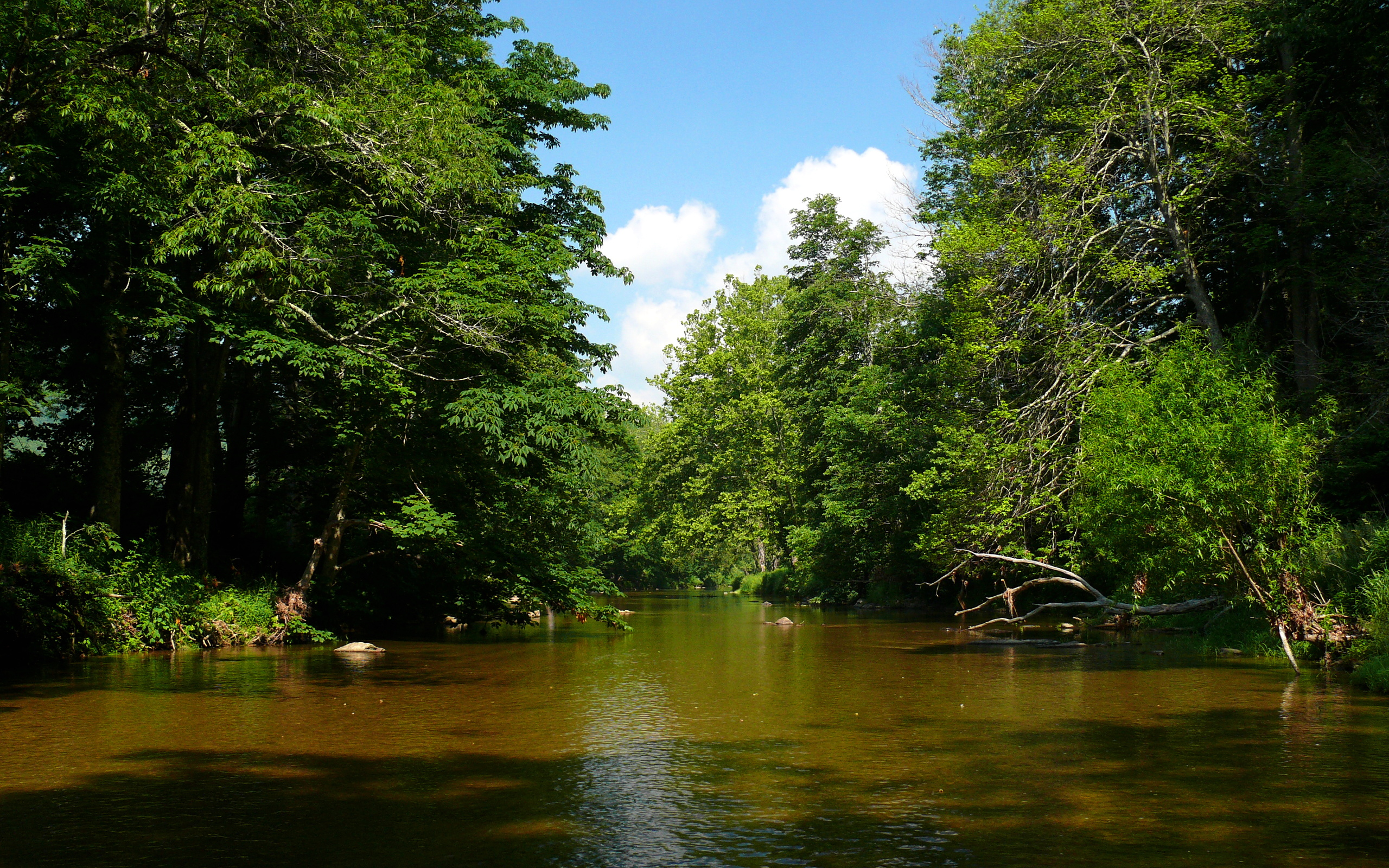
- The Watauga River near Valle Crucis, North Carolina

- Locator – overview

- Location of the mouth of Watauga River in Tennessee
- Etymology: Native American

Location
- Country: United States
- States: North Carolina, Tennessee
- Counties: Avery NC, Watauga NC, Johnson TN, Carter TN, Sullivan TN, Washington TN

Physical characteristics
- Source: Linville Gap
  - location: Sugar Mountain, North Carolina
  - coordinates: 36°07′25″N 81°50′07″W
  - elevation: 4,051 ft (1,235 m)
- Mouth: Holston River, South Fork
  - location: Gray, Tennessee
  - coordinates: 36°26′50″N 82°25′15″W
  - elevation: 1,352 ft (412 m)
- Length: 78.5 mi (126.3 km)
- Basin size: 867.849 sq mi (2,247.72 km^{2})

Basin features
- Progression: Watauga → Holston → Tennessee → Ohio → Mississippi → Gulf of Mexico

The Watauga River (/wəˈtɔːɡə/) is a large stream of western North Carolina and East Tennessee. It is 78.5 miles (126.3 km) long with its headwaters in Linville Gap to the South Fork Holston River at Boone Lake.

== Course ==
The Watauga River rises from a spring located south of Peak Mountain at Linville Gap in Avery County, North Carolina. The spring emanates from the western side of the Tennessee Valley Divide, which is, at this location, congruent with the Eastern Continental Divide. On the other side of the divide at Linville Gap are the headwaters of the Linville River in the Upper Catawba watershed. Waters of the Linville River eventually reach the Atlantic Ocean, whereas waters of the Watauga River reach the Gulf of Mexico; hence the Eastern Continental Divide. The river then flows across Watauga County, North Carolina, crossing the Tennessee state line (River Mile (RM) 55.1) at Johnson County, then into Carter County, Tennessee and ends at its confluence with the Holston River's South Fork (RM 0) on the Washington/Sullivan County border.

=== Impoundment ===
After crossing into Johnson County, the Watauga River is first impounded by the Tennessee Valley Authority (TVA) Watauga Dam, creating the 6,430-acre (2,600 ha) Watauga Lake. This impoundment receives two important tributaries: the Elk River and Roan Creek. Watauga Lake is bridged by Tennessee State Route 67 over Butler Memorial Bridge just as the watercourse enters Carter County. The Appalachian Trail crosses the river on Watauga Dam.

Nearly 3 miles below Watauga Dam, on the Horseshoe section of the Watauga River, is the TVA Wilbur Dam, which impounds a much smaller, but very deep and man-made Wilbur Reservoir. TVA releases approximately 130 cubic feet per second (3.7 m^{3}/s) of discharged water back into the Watauga River during the summer months. Below Wilbur Dam the river flows generally north and then west into Carter County where it forms the northern limits of Elizabethton, where the Watauga then receives the Doe River. Farther downstream on the Watauga River at the boundary between Carter County and Washington County is the old TVA Watauga Steam Plant.

A portion of the boundary line between Washington County and Sullivan County is formed by the Watauga River. Boone Dam is located below the slack water confluence of both South Fork Holston River and the downstream end (mouth) of the Watauga River. The distance afloat between the TVA Watauga Reservoir and Boone Lake is approximately 20.6 miles (33.2 km).

== History ==
The true origin of the name of the Watauga River is probably lost to antiquity. Most documents agree that the name is of Native American origin, though which nation, tribe or language it descends from, and its meaning, are in question. Early Tennessee historian John Haywood states in his "The Civil and Political History of the State of Tennessee" published in 1823 that the "Watauga signifies the River of Islands, or the Island River. The Holston River was known to the Cherokees by the name of Watauga". Pre-Civil War maps of Tennessee show that the river designated as the Holston River extended west of Knoxville, meeting with the Clinch River near Kingston and well past the present-day beginning of the Tennessee River (east of Knoxville) at the confluence of both the Holston River and the French Broad River.

A North Carolina State University web page (the Watauga Medal) says the word "Watauga" is a Native-American word meaning "the land beyond". Local references say the name means "beautiful river" or "beautiful water". There were at least two Native American villages so named, including one at present-day Elizabethton, which became known as "Watauga Old Fields", referring to former Native American residents. It was first explored by Daniel Boone and James Robertson in 1759. A historic Cherokee town known as Watauga was located along the Little Tennessee River near present-day Franklin, North Carolina, in their homelands.

The original settlers of Nashville, Tennessee, set out west from the Watauga River area, called the Watauga Association, during the American Revolution. They realized that the British Proclamation of 1763, forbidding colonial settlement west of the Blue Ridge Mountains in order to protect Native American territories, was essentially unenforceable.

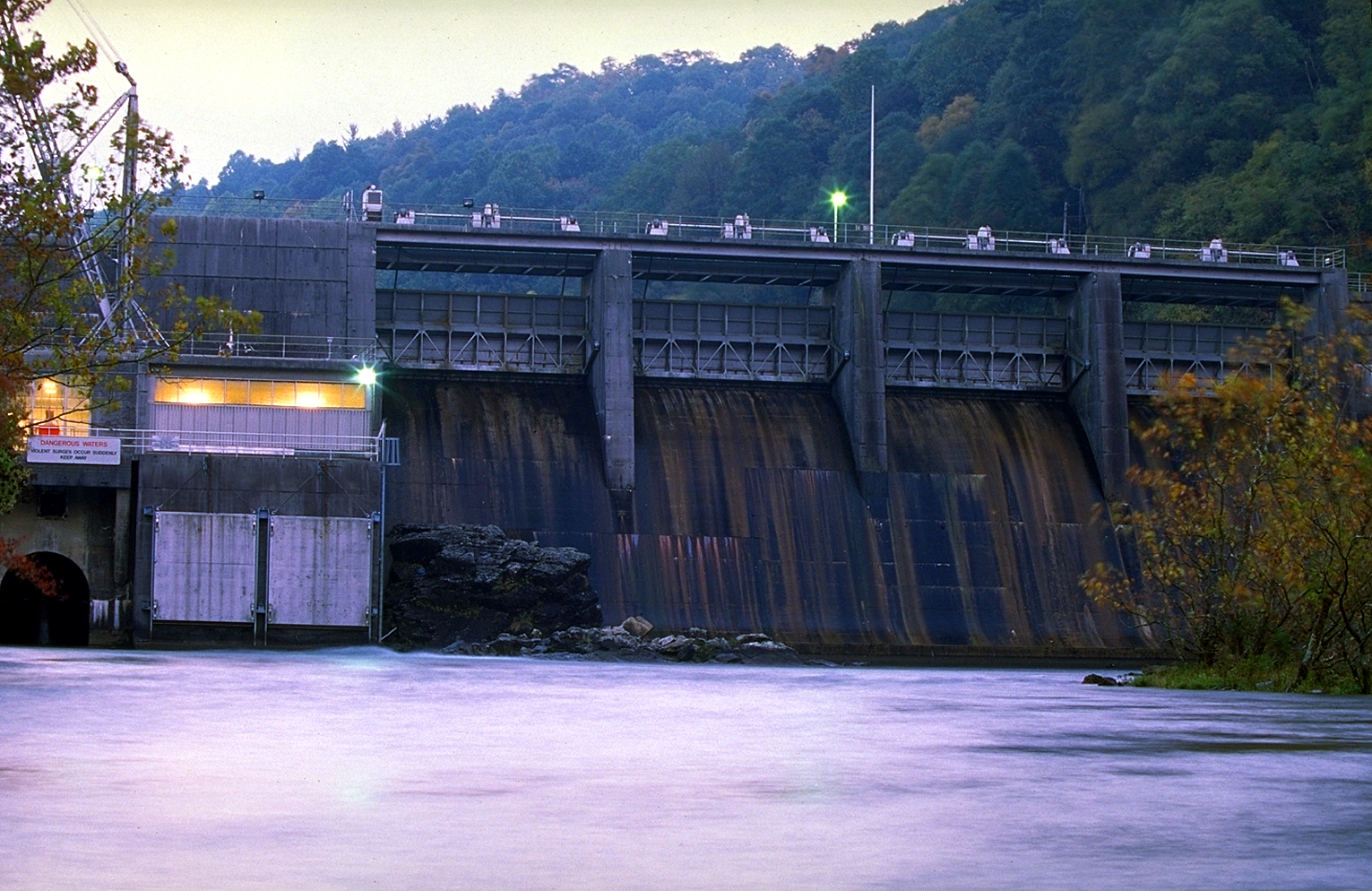
The Watauga River below the TVA Wilbur Dam

Wilbur Dam is the site of first hydroelectric dam constructed in Tennessee (beginning in 1909), going online with power production and distribution in 1912. Wilbur Dam was constructed on the Watauga River by the former Tennessee Electric Power Company, a privately owned utility purchased by the TVA in the late 1930s. Elizabethton acquired the moniker "City of Power" because of its early access to hydro-generated electricity from Wilbur Dam.

The Watauga river is home to the endangered green floater mussel (Lasmigona subviridis). The river is also a breeding site for eastern hellbenders (Cryptobranchus alleganiensis alleganiensis).

== Recreation ==
Whitewater rafting, kayaking, canoeing, fly fishing, and angling with fishing reels are all popular recreation activities pursued on the Watauga River. Rainbow trout, brown trout, and striped bass are all caught in the Watauga River.

=== Whitewater ===
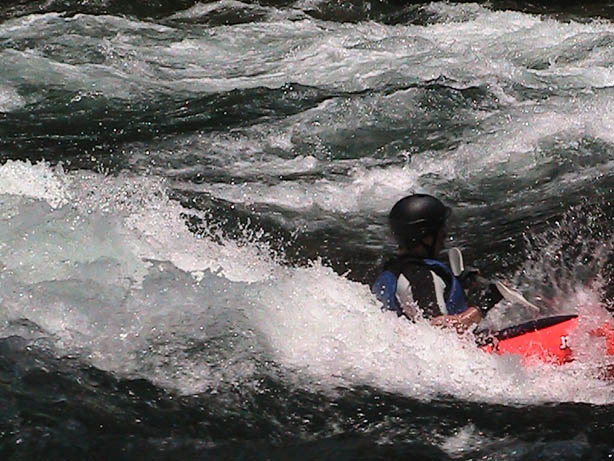
Kayaker at the Bee Cliff Rapids paddling inside "The Big Hole"

The Watauga River downstream of the TVA dams draws commercial rafting outfitters from both northeast Tennessee and western North Carolina during the summer months and commercial fishing guides throughout the year. The picturesque Class II+ Bee Cliff Rapids on the Watauga River (also referred to the "Anaconda Rapids" by some North Carolina–based rafting companies) are found downstream between Wilbur Dam and the Siam Bridge, southeast of Elizabethton.

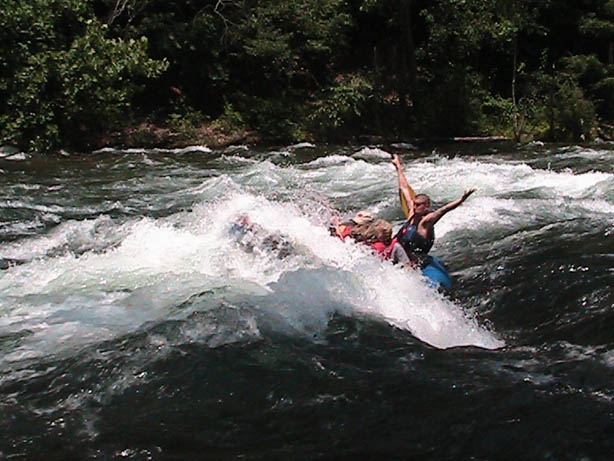
Raft guide, Trey Boggs, plunging whitewater rafters downstream through "The Big Hole" in the Bee Cliff Rapids

For commercial whitewater rafting and kayaking on the Watauga River, the most popular Carter County "put-in" is immediately downstream of the TVA Wilbur Dam, and the most popular "take-out" is 2 to 2½ hours downstream (depending upon the volume of the reservoir release and other factors) at the Blackbottom riverside portion of the city linear trail park in Elizabethton. The distance afloat for paddlers from the put-in at Wilbur Dam to the Blackbottom take-out is approximately seven miles, with landmarks along the Watauga River providing a good estimate of time and distance traveled.

| Wilbur Dam to Bee Cliff Rapids | ~15 minutes |
| Wilbur Dam to Siam Bridge | ~30 minutes |
| Wilbur Dam to Hunter Bridge (TWRA put-in/take out) | ~60 minutes |
| Wilbur Dam to Gilbert Peters Bridge at US 19-E in Elizabethton | ~90 minutes |
| Wilbur Dam to Bristol Bridge in Elizabethton | ~120 minutes |

The Watauga River also has a section of Class IV-V whitewater popular with expert kayakers, upstream of Watauga Lake in North Carolina. This section requires significant rainfall to bring it up to runnable levels. It features continuous steep boulder bed rapids dropping up to 150 feet per mile (28 m/km), and several falls and ledges only runnable by expert paddlers.

=== TVA recreation areas ===
The Tennessee Valley Authority maintains a self-service public campground below Watauga Dam. Amenities and recreational opportunities at the TVA Watauga Dam Tailwater Campground include 29 camp sites with electric hookups, rest rooms with heated showers and flush toilets, dump station, public phone, picnic tables and grills, canoe access, boat ramps above and below dam, lake and river fishing, hiking trail, walking trail, wildlife viewing area, and birdwatching.

=== Influence of weather ===
The TVA regulates flow of the Watauga River by scheduling the release of deep, impounded reservoir waters from behind both the Watauga Dam and Wilbur Dam. As a result, the summer temperature of the Watauga River is approximately 52–53°F (11–12 °C) downstream of the dams. The Watauga River is generally comfortable for kayaking, canoeing, and rafting during the summer months, but care must be taken to prevent hypothermia by prolonged exposure to the cold river water.

As TVA also guarantees a minimum release schedule during the summer season for riverine recreation below Wilbur Dam, the Watauga River will draw commercial whitewater rafting companies from distant rivers—such as the Nolichucky River running through Erwin, Tennessee in Unicoi County—when lack of adequate summer rain fall will not allow for rafting trips on these naturally flowing rivers during seasonal droughts.

Climate of Watauga River at Elizabethton, Tennessee
| Month | Jan | Feb | Mar | Apr | May | Jun | Jul | Aug | Sep | Oct | Nov | Dec | Annual |
| Avg °F(°C) | 34.0^{°F} 1.1^{°C} | 37.4^{°F} 3.0^{°C} | 47.2^{°F} 8.4^{°C} | 55.2^{°F} 12.9^{°C} | 63.4^{°F} 17.4^{°C} | 71.1^{°F} 21.7^{°C} | 74.4^{°F} 23.6^{°C} | 73.6^{°F} 23.1^{°C} | 67.9^{°F} 19.9^{°C} | 56.7^{°F} 13.7^{°C} | 47.0^{°F} 8.3^{°C} | 38.2^{°F} 3.4^{°C} | 55.5^{°F} 13.1^{°C} |
| Avg high °F(°C) | 43.7^{°F} 6.5^{°C} | 48.0^{°F} 8.9^{°C} | 58.9^{°F} 14.9^{°C} | 67.4^{°F} 19.7^{°C} | 75.2^{°F} 24.0^{°C} | 82.2^{°F} 27.9^{°C} | 84.6^{°F} 29.2^{°C} | 84.1^{°F} 28.9^{°C} | 79.1^{°F} 26.2^{°C} | 69.1^{°F} 20.6^{°C} | 58.2^{°F} 14.6^{°C} | 48.1^{°F} 8.9^{°C} | 66.6^{°F} 19.2^{°C} |
| Avg low °F(°C) | 24.3^{°F} -4.3^{°C} | 26.8^{°F} -2.9^{°C} | 35.4^{°F} 1.9^{°C} | 43.0^{°F} 6.1^{°C} | 51.6^{°F} 10.9^{°C} | 59.9^{°F} 15.5^{°C} | 64.1^{°F} 17.8^{°C} | 63.1^{°F} 17.3^{°C} | 56.6^{°F} 13.7^{°C} | 44.2^{°F} 6.8^{°C} | 35.9^{°F} 2.2^{°C} | 28.2^{°F} -2.1^{°C} | 44.4^{°F} 6.9^{°C} |
| Rain (inches) | 3.2 in. | 3.4 in. | 3.7 in. | 3.3 in. | 3.8 in. | 3.5 in. | 4.3 in. | 3.2 in. | 3.3 in. | 2.6 in. | 2.9 in. | 3.4 in. | 40.7 in. |
| Snow (inches) | 5.2 in. | 4.2 in. | 2.3 in. | 0.4 in. | 0.05 in. | 0.05 in. | 0.0 in. | 0.0 in. | 0.05 in. | 0.0 in. | 0.9 in. | 2.6 in. | 15.6 in. |
Sources for Watauga River at Elizabethton (Bristol-Johnson City, Tennessee) climate statistics: climate-zone.com'

== See also ==
- Dragging Canoe
- Fort Watauga
- International Scale of River Difficulty
- List of rivers of Tennessee
- Overmountain Men
- Riverboarding
- River surfing
- Sycamore Shoals
- Watauga, Tennessee
