= Boone Lake =

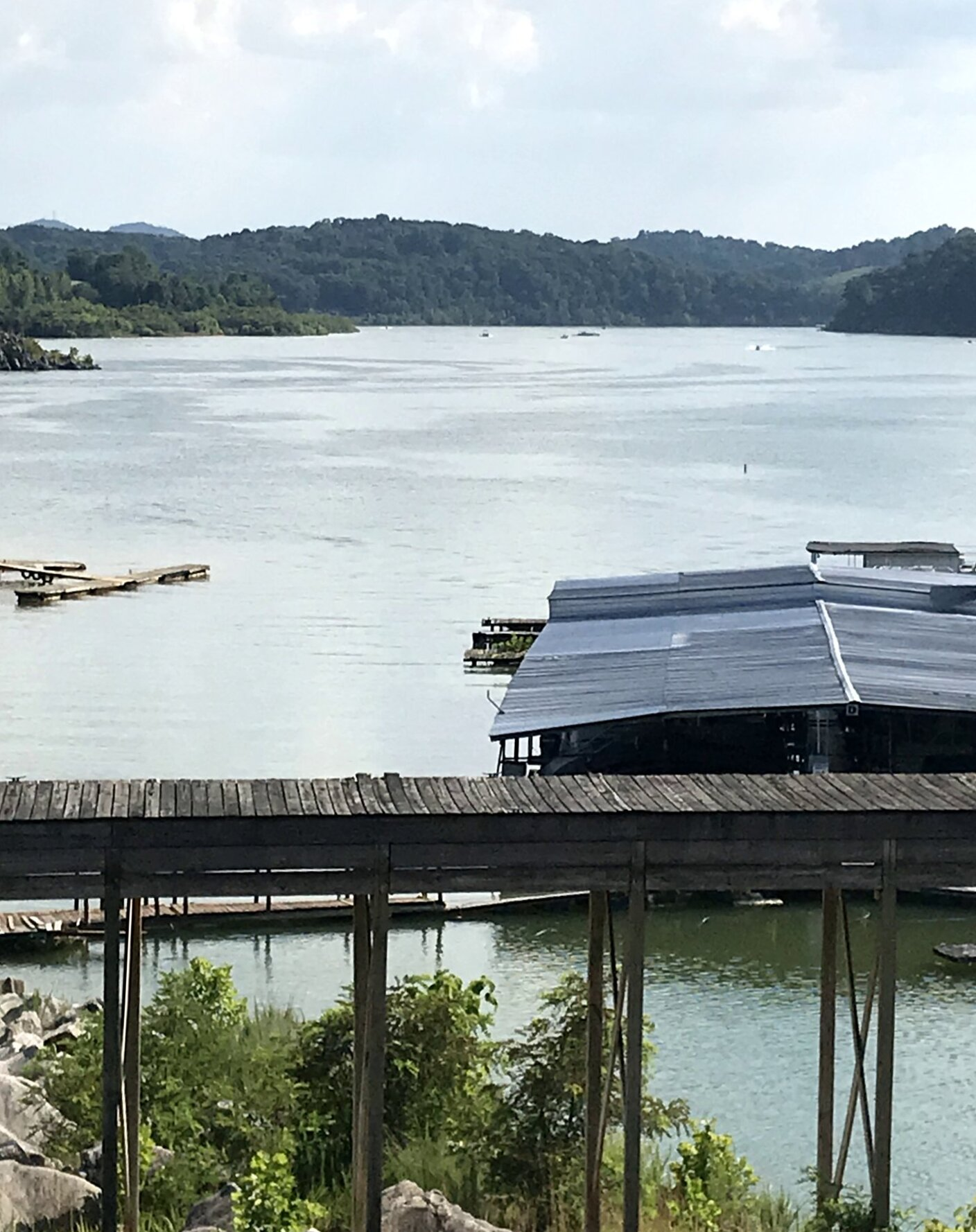
- The Lakeview Marina on Boone Lake

- Location within Tennessee Location within the United States
- Location: Sullivan / Washington counties, Tennessee, United States
- Coordinates: 36°26′25″N 082°26′18″W
- Type: reservoir
- Primary inflows: South Fork Holston River, Watauga River
- Primary outflows: South Fork Holston River
- Basin countries: United States
- Surface area: 4,400 acres (18 km^{2})
- Water volume: 75,829 acre⋅ft (0.093534 km^{3})
- Surface elevation: 1,375 ft (419 m)

Boone Lake is a reservoir in Sullivan and Washington counties in northeastern Tennessee, formed by the impoundment of the South Fork Holston River and Watauga River behind Boone Dam. Boone Reservoir’s 4,400 acres (1,800 ha) extend along the South Fork Holston River forming two river extensions. According to TVA, “at maximum pool level, one arm of the lake extends about 16 miles (26 km) up the South Fork Holston River, and the other extends approximately 15 miles (24 km) up the Watauga River".

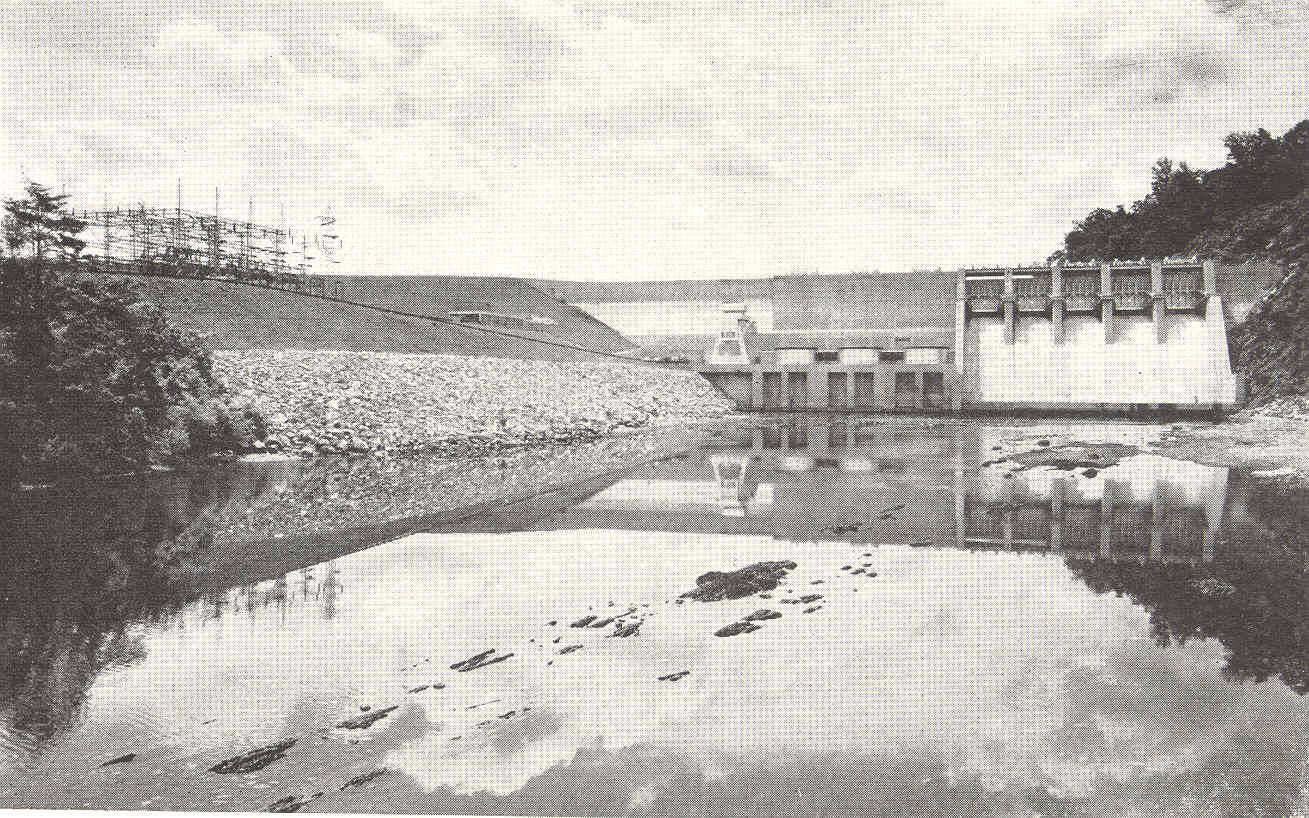
Boone Dam c. 1956

The dam and reservoir are maintained and operated by the Tennessee Valley Authority (TVA). The lake has a surface area of about 4,400 acres (18 km^{2}) and a flood-storage capacity of 75,829 acre-feet (93,534,000 m^{3}). Water levels in the reservoir fluctuate over a range of about 20 feet (6 m) over the course of a year.

Boone Lake may house one of the smaller lakes that the state has to offer, but the lakefront real estate packs a southern punch - with the average cost of shorefront property sitting at a cool $1.37 million according to a 2020 study. This places Boone Lake as the sixteenth most expensive lake shorefront property in the United States. At the time of the study, the dam repair was still underway; greatly reducing the accessibility, aesthetics and shoreline of the lake.

Recreational facilities on the lake include a swimming area and a boat ramp. Water skiing and fishing are popular activities on the lake. Fish species in the lake of interest to sport fishermen include brown trout, lake trout, rainbow trout, largemouth bass, smallmouth bass, and striped bass. There are precautionary fish consumption advisories for catfish and carp due to PCB and chlordane concentrations. Children and women who are pregnant or breastfeeding are advised not to consume these two species, and other persons are advised to limit their consumption to one meal per month.

Boone Lake is the public forum to discuss topics related to Boone Lake.
