= South Holston Lake =

Lake in Tennessee and Virginia, US

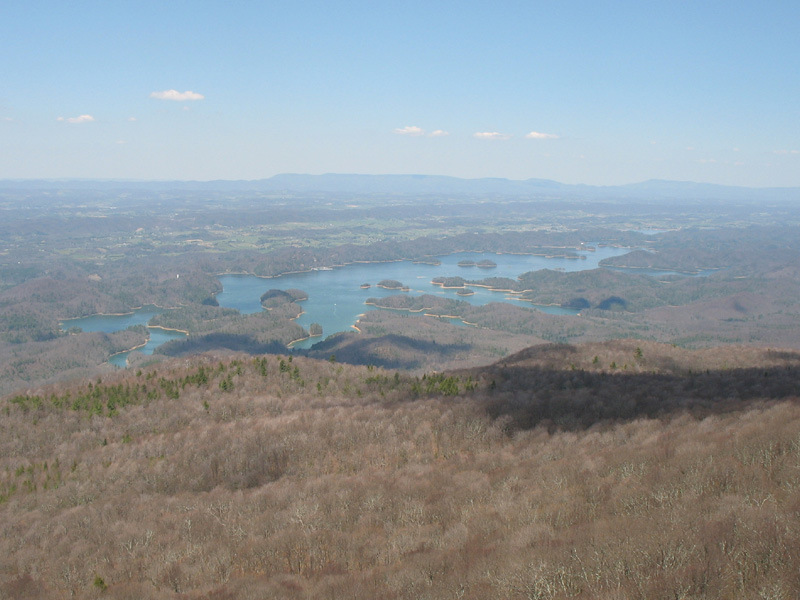
- South Holston Lake viewed from Holston High Knob on Holston Mountain.

- Location within Tennessee Location within Virginia Location within the United States
- Location: Sullivan County, Tennessee / Washington County, Virginia
- Coordinates: 36°31′27″N 82°05′15″W
- Type: reservoir
- Primary inflows: South Fork Holston River / Middle Fork Holston River
- Primary outflows: South Fork Holston River
- Basin countries: United States
- Surface area: 7,580 acres (30.7 km^{2})
- Max. depth: 250 ft (76 m)
- Surface elevation: 1,729 ft (527 m)

South Holston Lake is located near the town of Abingdon, Virginia and the city of Bristol, Virginia / Bristol, Tennessee, and is a 7,580-acre (31 km^{2}) impoundment operated by the Tennessee Valley Authority (TVA). Much of the reservoir is in Tennessee, but the Virginia portion of the reservoir offers anglers more than 1,600 acres (6 km^{2}) of water. South Holston Lake is said to stand out from the rest and is always a favorite amongst boaters. At this time there is a South Holston Reservoir Fishing License that will allow anglers from the two states to fish the entire lake with the purchase of this license.

== Technical details ==
Construction of the dam began in 1942 but was halted in favor of other wartime construction efforts. The building resumed in 1947 and was completed in 1950.

South Holston is for flood damage reduction, power production, aquatic ecology, and augmentation of the flow of water during drier periods.

The earth-and-rockfill dam is 285 feet (87 m) high and reaches 1,600 feet (490 m) across the South Fork Holston River. South Holston Dam is a hydroelectric facility. It has one generating unit with a summer net dependable capacity of 41 megawatts. Net dependable capacity is the amount of power a dam can produce on an average day, minus the electricity used by the dam itself. In a year with normal rainfall, the water level in South Holston Reservoir varies about 25 feet (7.6 m) from summer to winter to provide seasonal flood storage. The reservoir has a flood-storage capacity of 252,800 acre-feet (311,800,000 m^{3}).

== Fishing and area information ==
South Holston offers good fishing for a variety of species. Black bass, bluegill, crappie, walleye, sunfish, and catfish are a few of the most sought after species. Predatory fish have diverse and abundant forage in the form of alewives, gizzard shad, threadfin shad and shiners. The lake's shoreline habitats offer anglers a good diversity of structure including rock bluffs, shale banks and flat clay points. Anglers who prefer trolling will also find a good selection of open water structure ranging from mud flats to river channel drop-offs to submerged islands.

== Activity ==
Due to the dropdown of Boone Lake, the activity on South Holston Lake grew at a rapid pace. The South Holston Lake brings along many recreational activities that allowed people to make lifelong memories such as, tubing, water skiing, camping, and fishing. It has become a second home for some.

== Events ==
Every year on the 4th of July, the area has a fireworks display in which the fireworks can be seen everywhere over the lake. There are also many fishing and boat racing events in the summer.
