= Watauga Dam =

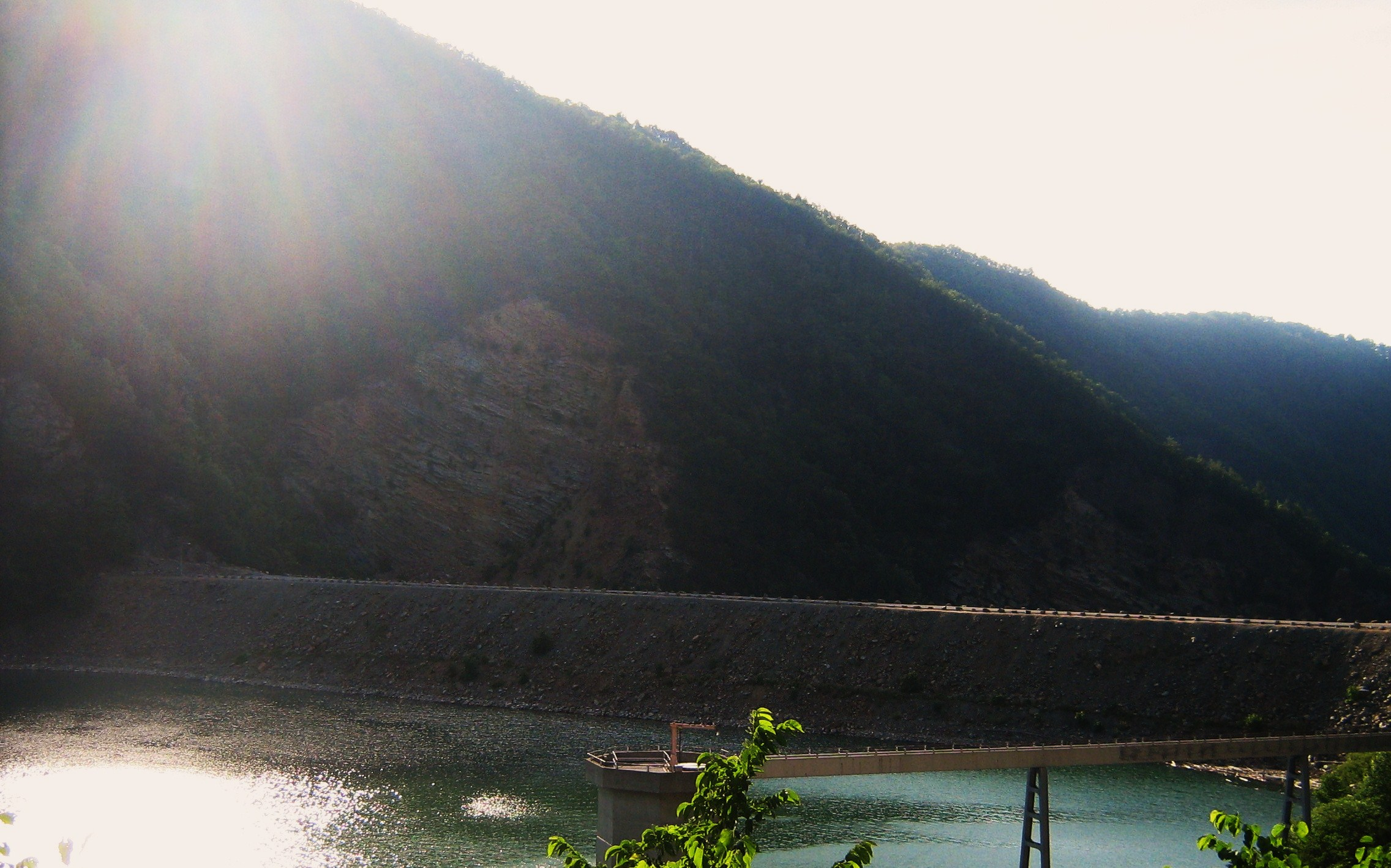
- Watauga Dam (from upstream), June 2008
- Interactive map of Watauga Dam
- Official name: Watauga Dam
- Location: Carter County, Tennessee, United States
- Coordinates: 36°19′24″N 82°7′19″W
- Construction began: February 16, 1942
- Opening date: December 1, 1948
- Operator: Tennessee Valley Authority

Dam and spillways
- Impounds: Watauga River
- Height: 318 feet (97 m)
- Length: 900 feet (270 m)

Reservoir
- Creates: Watauga Lake
- Total capacity: 677,000 acre⋅ft (835,000 dam^{3})

Watauga Dam is a hydroelectric and flood control dam on the Watauga River in Carter County, in the U.S. state of Tennessee. It is owned and operated by the Tennessee Valley Authority, which built the dam in the 1940s as part of efforts to control flooding in the Tennessee River watershed. At 318 feet (97 m), Watauga is the second-highest dam in the TVA river and reservoir system (behind only Fontana), and at the time of its completion was one of the highest earth-and-rock dams in the United States. The dam impounds the TVA Watauga Reservoir of 6,430 acres (2,600 ha), and its tailwaters feed into Wilbur Lake.

Its namesake, the Watauga River, was named after a Cherokee settlement—the Watauga Old Fields—once located along the river at modern Elizabethton. It was listed on the National Register of Historic Places on August 11, 2017. The top of the dam is crossed by the Appalachian Trail,

== Location ==
Watauga Dam is located 37 miles (60 km) above the mouth of the Watauga, at a point where the westward-flowing river veers north to slice a water gap through the middle of Iron Mountain. The dam is about 5 miles (8.0 km) downstream from Butler, Tennessee, and 10 miles (16 km) upstream from Elizabethton. Watauga Lake stretches for 16.7 miles (26.9 km) along the river, nearly reaching the Tennessee-North Carolina state line, and includes parts of Carter County and Johnson County in Tennessee. Roan Creek, Cobb Creek, and the Elk River form substantial embayments along the reservoir.

== Capacity ==
Watauga Dam is an earth-and-rock dam 318 feet (97 m) high and 900 feet (270 m) long, and has a generating capacity of 57,600 kilowatts. The dam's fixed-crest morning glory spillway has a maximum discharge of 73,200 cubic feet per second (2,070 m^{3}/s). Watauga Lake has 106 miles (171 km) of shoreline and a storage capacity of 677,000 acre⋅ft (835,000 dam^{3}), of which 152,829 acre⋅ft (188,512 dam^{3}) is reserved for flood control. The reservoir's operating levels vary by about 9 feet (2.7 m) in a typical year.

Watauga's powerhouse is located nearly a mile downstream from the dam, and is connected to the reservoir intake by a 3,700-foot (1,100 m) tunnel. Just above the powerhouse, the tunnel splits into two steel conduits that carry the water to a valve house just above the turbines.

== Background and construction ==
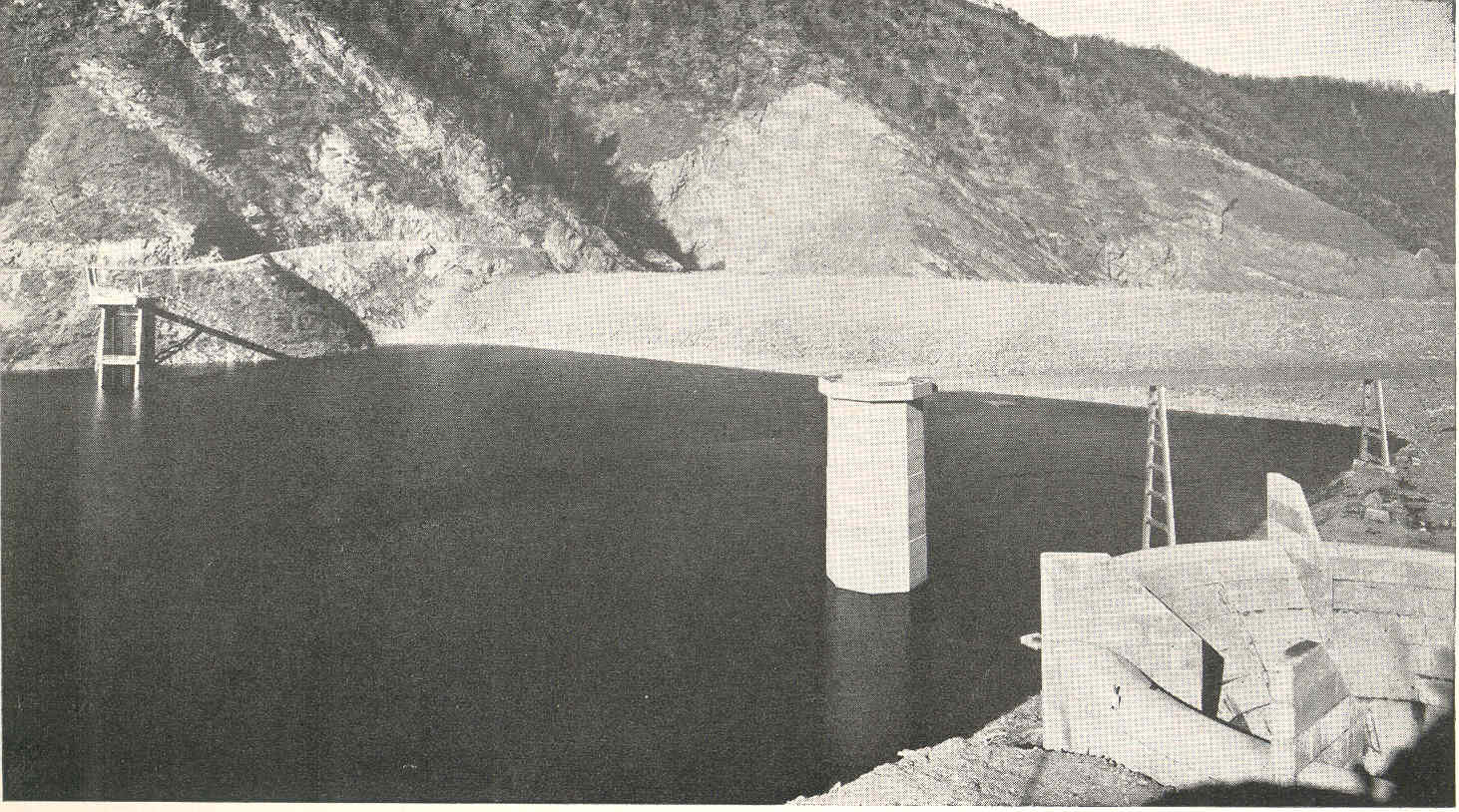
Watauga Dam (from upstream), circa 1950

The hydroelectric potential of the Watauga River had been recognized since the early 1900s, when the Watauga Power Company built Wilbur Dam 3 miles (4.8 km) downstream from the modern Watauga Dam site. In the 1920s, the Holston River Power Company began making plans for a large-scale dam-building project in the South Fork Holston River watershed, and had identified two possible dam sites along the Watauga, one of which was the current site of Watauga Dam (the company called it the "Cardens Bluff" site). In the early 1940s, the Tennessee Valley Authority, which had assumed oversight of flood control operations in the Tennessee River watershed in the previous decade, suggested a dam at the Cardens Bluff site to provide badly needed flood storage and help with the region's World War II energy demands. The dam project garnered widespread local support, especially from Elizabethton, which had been ravaged by a flood in 1940. The Watauga project was authorized December 17, 1941, and work on the dam began on February 16, 1942.

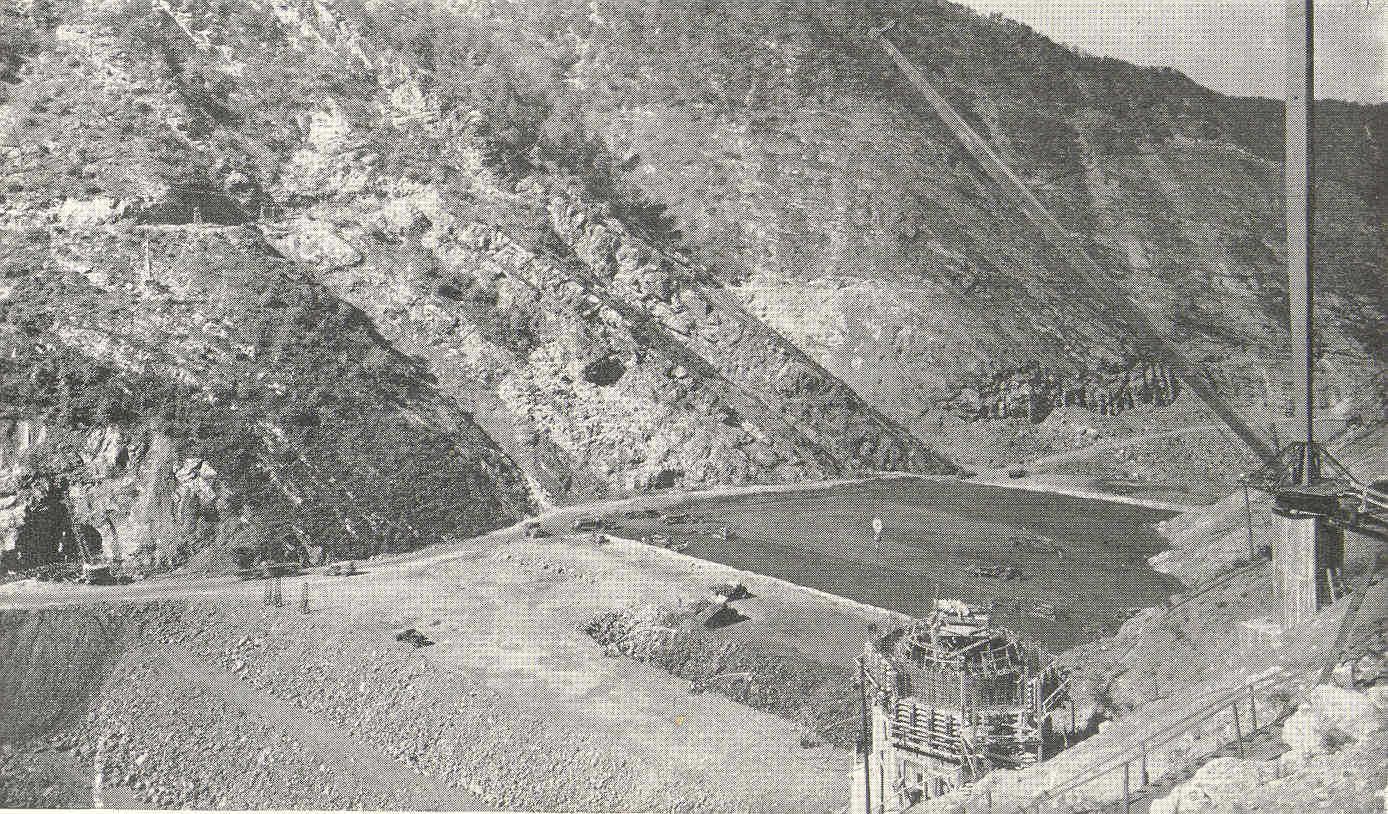
Construction work at the Watauga Dam site, circa 1940s

The construction of Watauga Dam and its reservoir required the purchase of 11,700 acres (47 km^{2}) of land, 1,663 acres (6.7 km^{2}) of which had to be cleared. This required the relocation of 761 families, 1,281 graves, and 55 miles (89 km) of roads and the construction of three new bridges. Wilbur Dam, located just 3 miles (4.8 km) downstream, had to be raised and outfitted with a new spillway. The town of Butler had to be moved. In October 1942, the U.S. War Production Board ordered TVA to halt the Watauga project, deeming it unnecessary for the nation's wartime needs. TVA spent several weeks securing the dam site and tunnel, and the project was set aside until the end of the war. Construction proceeded on May 22, 1946.

Many details went into the preparation of closing off the dam, including but not limited to, pouring concrete over the plug, relocating roads, construction of bridges and culverts, and removal of different debris and rocks. Watauga Dam was completed, and its gates opened December 1, 1948. The dam's first generator went online August 30, 1949, and the second went online September 29, 1949. The total cost of the Watauga project was just over $32 million.

== Popular culture ==
The Old Crow Medicine Show song "Half Mile Down", on the 2012 album Carry Me Back, is about the flooding of the narrator's home town (Butler, Tennessee) due to the construction of the dam.

== See also ==
- South Holston Dam
