= Wilbur Dam =

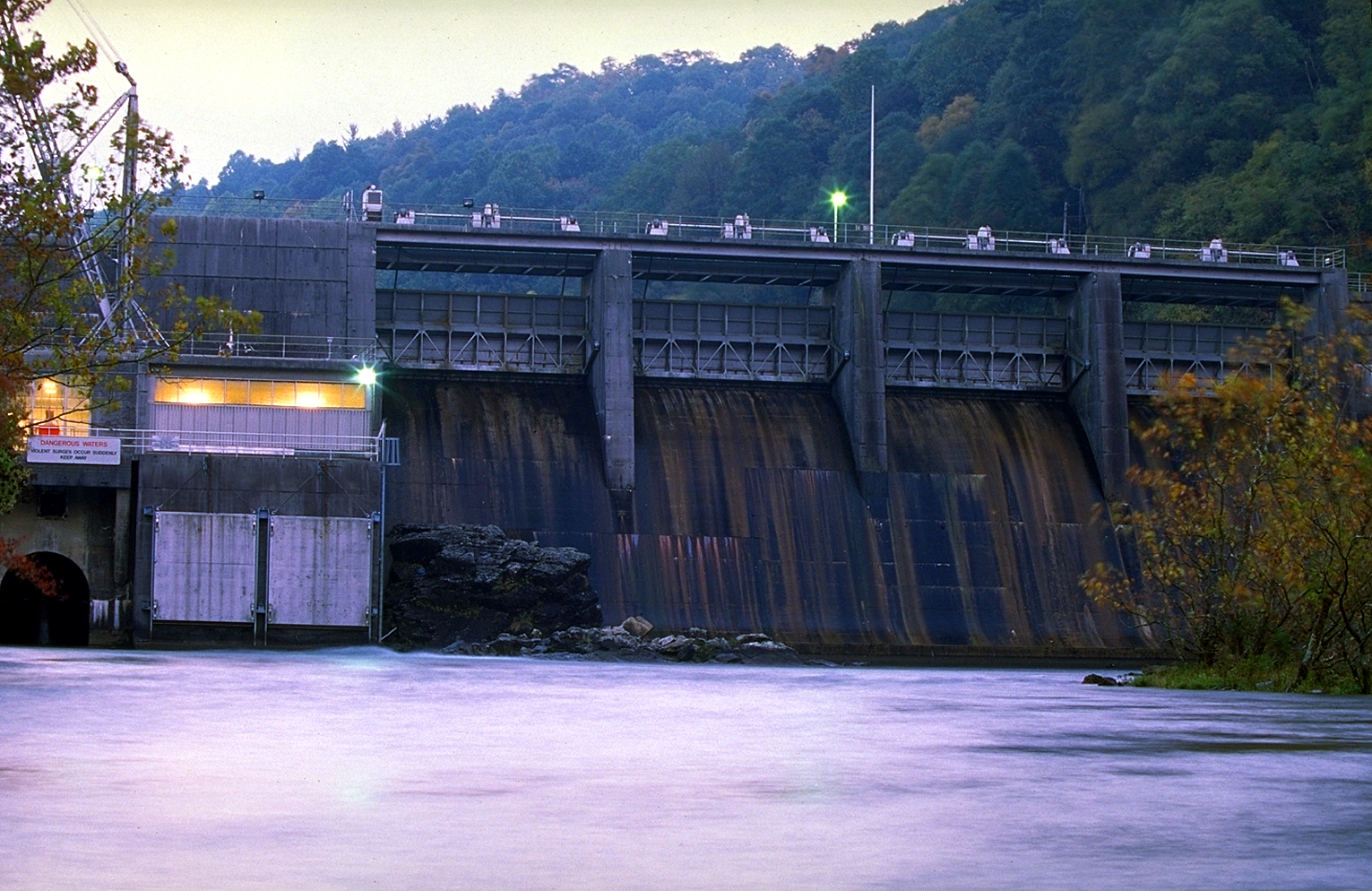
- Interactive map of Wilbur Dam
- Location: Carter County, Tennessee, United States
- Coordinates: 36.34106°N 82.12624°W
- Opening date: 1912

Dam and spillways
- Impounds: Watauga River
- Height: 77 feet (23 m)
- Length: 375 feet (114 m)

Power Station
- Installed capacity: 10,700 kilowatts

Wilbur Dam is a hydroelectric dam on the Watauga River in Carter County, in the U.S. state of Tennessee. It is one of two dams on the river owned and operated by the Tennessee Valley Authority. The dam impounds Wilbur Lake, which extends for about 3 miles (4.8 km) up the Watauga to the base of Watauga Dam. Wilbur Dam was completed in 1912 making it the second oldest dam in the TVA system behind Ocoee Dam No. 1. Wilbur Dam was one of the first major hydroelectric projects in Tennessee, and remains one of the oldest dams in the TVA system.

Wilbur Dam is a concrete gravity overflow dam 77 feet (23 m) high and 375 feet (114 m) long, and has a generating capacity of 10,700 kilowatts. The dam's spillway has four radial gates with a combined discharge of 34,000 cubic feet per second (960 m^{3}/s). The dam is located at just over 34 miles (55 km) above the mouth of the Watauga, a few miles upstream from Elizabethton, Tennessee.

In 1907, the Doe River Light & Power Company began purchasing land rights for construction of Wilbur Dam, although the company struggled with finances and sold the project to the Watauga Power Company in 1910. Watauga Power completed the dam in just two years, and found a ready market for the dam's electricity at nearby Elizabethton. In 1927, the dam was purchased by the Tennessee Central Service Company, which changed its name to East Tennessee Light & Power Company two years later. The flood of August 1940 overtopped the dam and destroyed its powerhouse, and five years later, East Tennessee Light & Power sold its assets, including Wilbur Dam, to the Tennessee Valley Authority.

Wilbur Dam was originally equipped with a flashboard-controlled spillway (similar to nearby Nolichucky Dam). In 1947, TVA outfitted the dam with a new gate-controlled spillway and raised it 5 feet (1.5 m) to accommodate the tailwaters of Watauga Dam, which was then nearing completion.
