= Fort Loudoun =

Fort Loudoun may refer to:

- Fort Loudoun (Tennessee), a British colonial fort in present-day Monroe County, Tennessee, United States
- Fort Loudoun (Pennsylvania), a British colonial fort in present-day Franklin County, Pennsylvania, United States
- Fort Loudoun (Virginia), a British colonial fort in present-day Winchester, Virginia, United States

== See also ==
- Fort Loudon, Pennsylvania, unincorporated community at site of colonial Fort Loudoun
- Fort Loudoun Dam, a hydroelectric dam on the Tennessee River in Loudon County, Tennessee, United States
- Fort Loudoun Lake, a man made lake on the Tennessee River, Tennessee, United States
