= Lt. Alexander "Sandy" Bonnyman Memorial Bridge =

- Coordinates: 35°50′58.99″N 84°0′31.93″W
- Carries: 4 lanes of I-140 (Pellissippi Parkway)
- Crosses: Fort Loudoun Lake, part of the Tennessee River
- Locale: Blount–Knox counties, Tennessee, United States
- Official name: Lt. Alexander "Sandy" Bonnyman Medal of Honor Memorial Bridge
- Maintained by: Tennessee Department of Transportation

Characteristics
- Total length: 1,716.9 feet (523.3 m)
- Width: 84 feet (26 m)
- Clearance below: 80 feet (24 m)

History
- Construction start: January 1987
- Construction end: Fall 1989
- Opened: December 4, 1992

Statistics
- Daily traffic: 60,384 (2025)

Location
- Interactive map of Lt. Alexander "Sandy" Bonnyman Memorial Bridge

The Lt. Alexander "Sandy" Bonnyman Medal of Honor Memorial Bridge is a bridge which carries the Pellissippi Parkway (Interstate 140, I-140) across the Fort Loudoun Lake impoundment of the Tennessee River between Blount and Knox counties in the US state of Tennessee. It was constructed between 1987 and 1989, and opened to traffic in 1992. It is named for Alexander Bonnyman Jr., a local United States Marine Corps officer who was killed in action in the Battle of Tarawa during World War II.

== Description ==
The bridge crosses the Tennessee River in a direct east−west alignment on Toole's Bend. Here, the river marks the boundary between Blount and Knox counties. It is a steel girder bridge, and is 1,716.9 feet (523.3 m) long. It has a maximum deck width of 84 feet (26 m), and its longest span is 460 feet (140 m) long. The vertical clearance below the bridge on the river is approximately 80 feet (24 m). The bridge carries four lanes of traffic, separated by a concrete Jersey barrier, and contains 12-foot (3.7 m) right shoulders and 6-foot (1.8 m) left shoulders.

== History ==
The bridge was first proposed as part of a plan in the early 1970s to extend the Pellissippi Parkway to U.S. Route 129 (US 129) near Alcoa, which originally ran between I-40/I-75 and State Route 62 (SR 62) in western Knox County. The site for the extension was unveiled to the public on December 24, 1984. Funding for the construction of the extension of the parkway was authorized by the Better Roads Program of 1986, and the bridge was the first part of the extension to begin construction. The contract for construction of the bridge was awarded in December 1986 at a cost of $11.8 million (equivalent to $29.4 million in 2025). The bridge was initially referred to as the "Pellissippi Parkway Bridge". Construction began in January 1987, with completion initially projected by August 1988. In April 1988, the bridge's piers had been completed, and installation of the framework began. The bridge was virtually completed by May 1989, although final work did not wrap up until the Fall.

The bridge could not open, however, until the adjoining sections of the parkway on both ends were complete, and had to remain unused for more than three years. During this time, it faced multiple acts of trespassing and vandalism, including graffiti and damage to the navigation lights. A bonfire was also reported to have been built on the bridge, and a number residents living nearby reported theft and damage and destruction of structures on their properties. In response to complaints from residents, the Knox and Blount County sheriffs' departments began to increase patrols of the site in the middle of 1990. On December 4, 1992, the bridge opened with the 6.6-mile (10.6 km) segment between US 129 in and SR 332. The bridge was officially named in honor of Alexander "Sandy" Bonnyman on September 7, 1997, in a dedication ceremony.
