= Fort Loudoun Dam =

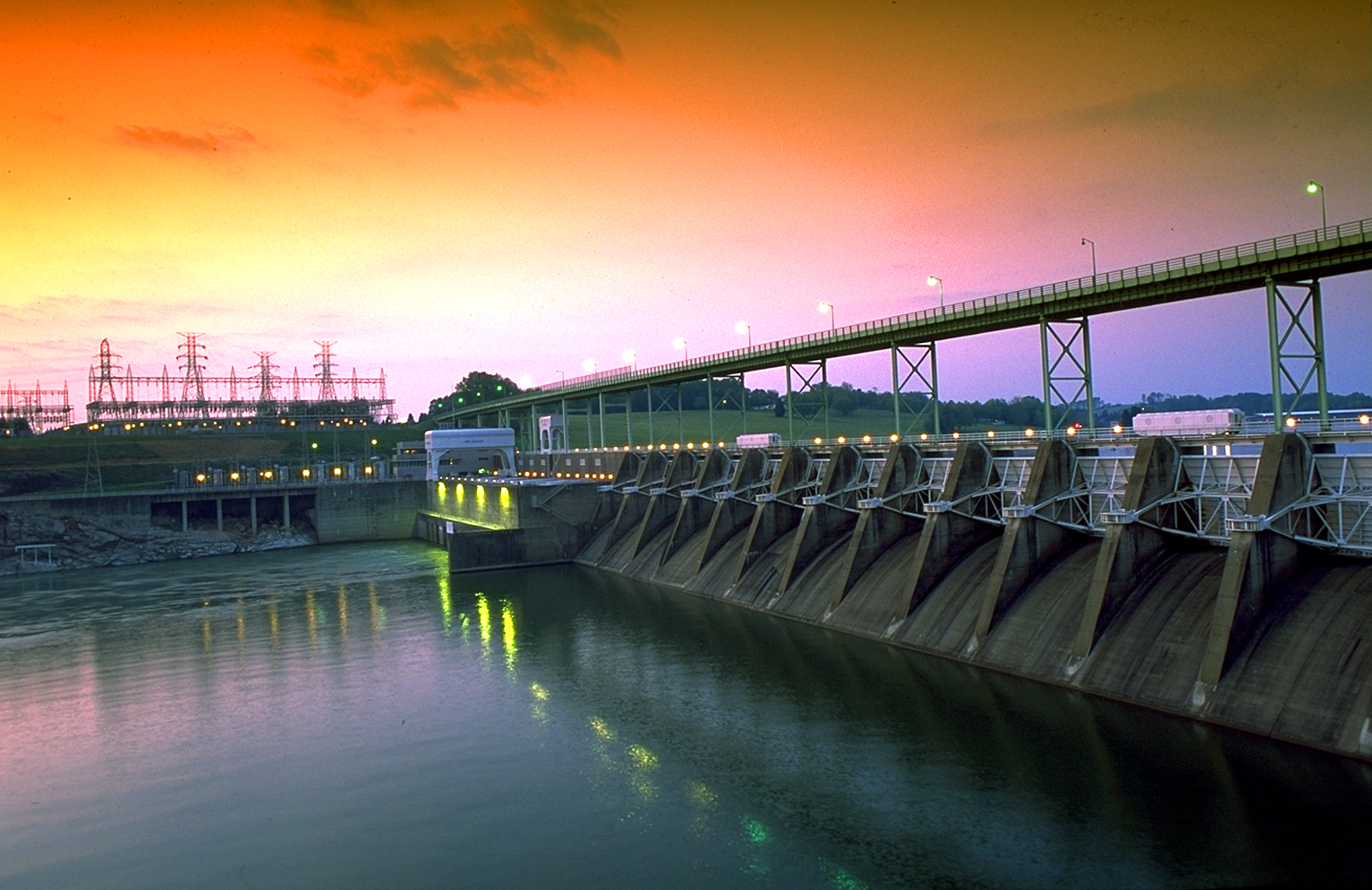
- Fort Loudoun Dam

- Location within Tennessee
- Official name: Fort Loudoun Dam
- Location: Loudon County, Tennessee, U.S.
- Coordinates: 35°47′27.27″N 84°14′33.54″W
- Purpose: Navigation, flood control, electricity
- Construction began: July 8, 1940
- Opening date: August 2, 1943
- Operator: Tennessee Valley Authority

Dam and spillways
- Impounds: Tennessee River
- Height: 122 ft (37 m)
- Length: 4,190 ft (1,280 m)

Reservoir
- Creates: Fort Loudoun Lake

Power Station
- Commission date: 1943-1948
- Turbines: 1 x 36 MW, 2 x 34 MW, 1 x 40 MW propeller
- Installed capacity: 144 MW

Fort Loudoun Dam is a hydroelectric dam on the Tennessee River in Loudon County, Tennessee, in the southeastern United States. The dam is operated by the Tennessee Valley Authority (TVA), which built the dam in the early 1940s as part of a unified plan to provide electricity and flood control in the Tennessee Valley and create a continuous 652-mile (1,049 km) navigable river channel from Knoxville, Tennessee, to Paducah, Kentucky. It is the uppermost of nine TVA dams on the Tennessee River.

The dam impounds the 14,600-acre (5,900 ha) Fort Loudoun Lake and its tailwaters are part of Watts Bar Lake. The generating capacity of Fort Loudoun Dam is enhanced by the Tellico Reservoir, from which water is diverted via canal to Fort Loudoun Lake. It and associated infrastructure were listed on the National Register of Historic Places in 2017.

Fort Loudoun Dam is named after Fort Loudoun, an 18th-century British colonial fort built during the French and Indian War. The fort— which was located about 10 miles (16 km) south of the dam site— was named for John Campbell, 4th Earl of Loudoun, commander of British forces in North America during this period.

== Location ==
Fort Loudoun Dam is located at just over 602 miles (969 km) upstream from the mouth of the Tennessee River and nearly 50 miles (80 km) downstream from the river's source at the confluence of the Holston and French Broad at Knoxville. The river's natural confluence with the Little Tennessee River is located approximately 1 mile (1.6 km) downstream, although the Tellico Reservoir, which covers most of the lower Little Tennessee, is connected to Fort Loudoun Lake via canal which empties into the lake upstream from the dam. Lenoir City is located immediately north of Fort Loudoun Dam. The reservoir includes parts of Loudon, Blount, and Knox counties.

Fort Loudoun Dam was built across three small islands (known as the "Belle Canton Islands"), although the construction of the dam and the later construction of Tellico Dam required a drastic modification of the landscape. The northern and eastern parts of these islands are now submerged, whereas the southern and western parts were combined with part of the original mainland and part of Bussell Island (at the mouth of the Little Tennessee) to form one large island. This new island is separated from the mainland by the Tellico canal to the south and the main Tennessee River channel to the north.

From 1963 until the bridge's closure in July 2017, Lamar Alexander Parkway (part of U.S. Route 321) crossed the J. Carmichael Greer Bridge atop Fort Loudoun Dam and connected the area to Interstate 75 and Interstate 40 to the north and to Maryville and the Great Smoky Mountains National Park to the south. US-321 intersects U.S. Route 11 just over a mile north of the dam in Lenoir City. Interstate 140 and several federal and state highways cross Fort Loudoun Lake further upstream. A new bridge south-east of the dam was completed in the summer of 2017 and now carries Parkway traffic across the river.

== Capacity and dimensions ==
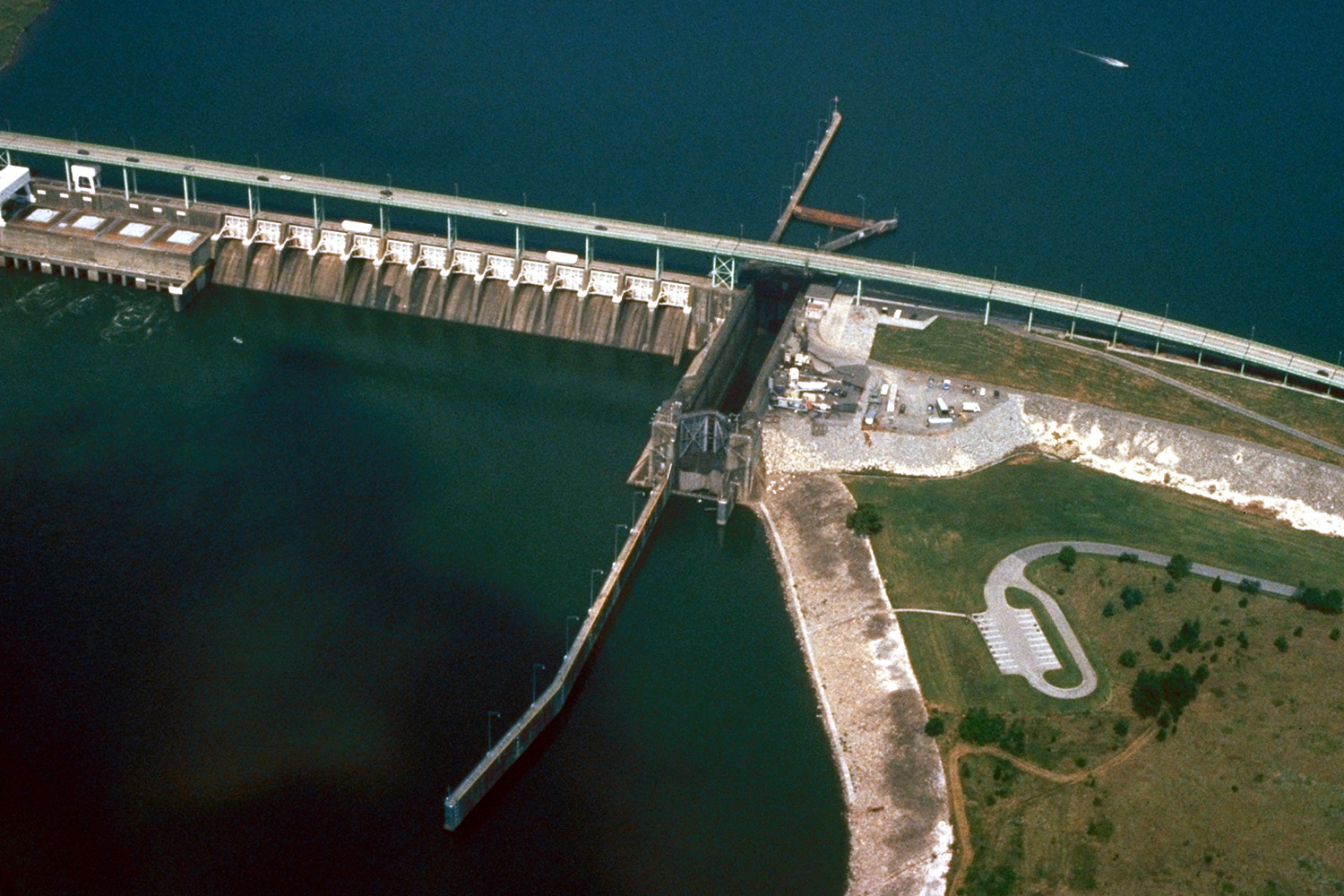
Fort Loudoun Lock and Dam. View is upriver to the northwest.

Fort Loudoun Dam is 122 feet (37 m) high and stretches 4,190 feet (1,280 m) across the Tennessee River. The reservoir has 379 miles (610 km) of shoreline, 14,600 acres (5,900 ha) of water surface, and a flood storage capacity of 111,000 acre-feet (137,000,000 m^{3}). The dam is equipped with a 60-by-360-foot (18 by 110 m) lock that raises and lowers boats about 70 feet (21 m) between Fort Loudoun Lake (upstream) and Watts Bar Lake (downstream). There are four hydroelectric generators at the dam with a combined generation capacity of 155.6 megawatts of electricity.

To augment Fort Loudoun's power production capacity, water from the Little Tennessee River is diverted into Fort Loudoun Lake via a short canal extending from Tellico Reservoir a short distance upstream of the nearby Tellico Dam. The canal is roughly a half-mile long and effectively creates an island with Fort Loudoun Dam at its northeastern tip and Tellico Dam at its southwestern tip. The canal also allows navigation by barge-size craft between the Tellico Reservoir and Fort Loudoun Lake.

== Background and construction ==
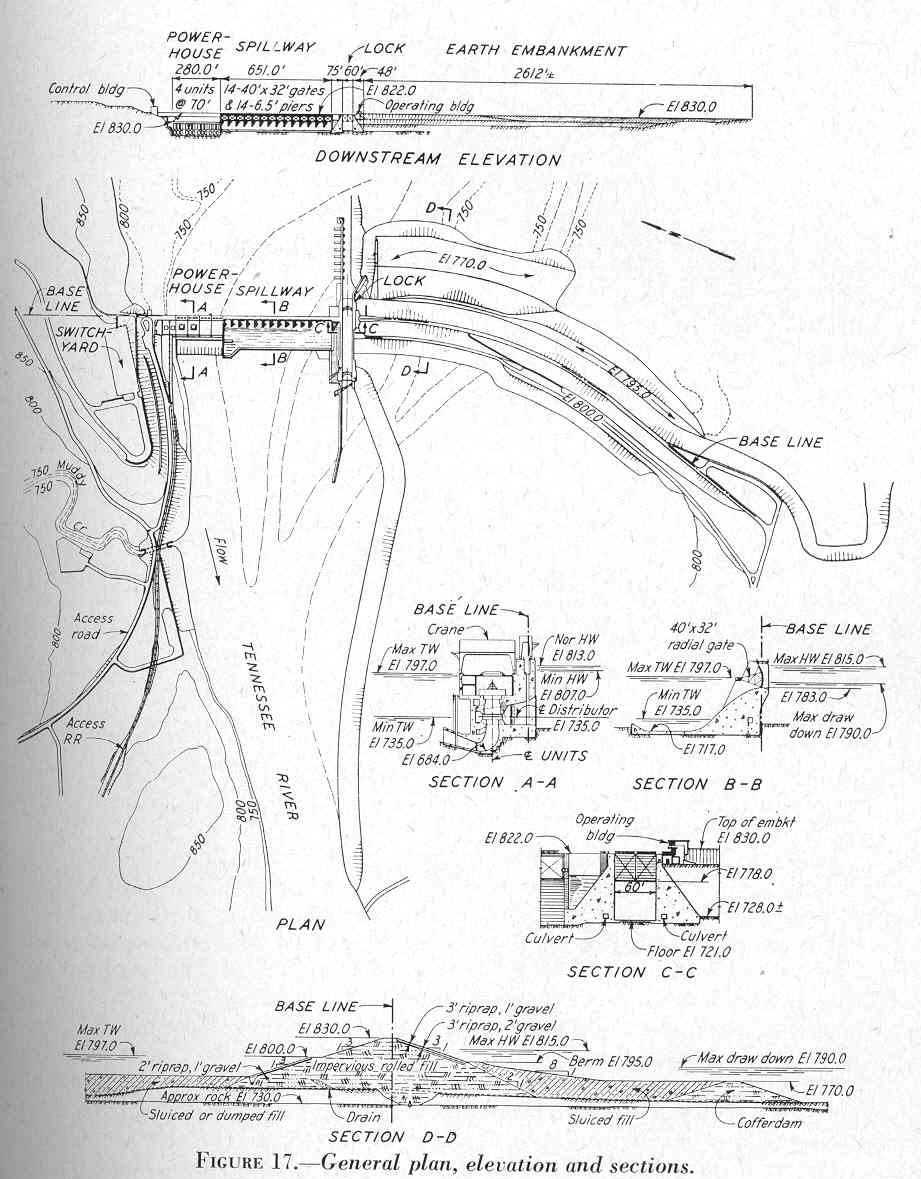
TVA's design plan for Fort Loudoun Dam, circa 1940

In the mid-1930s, TVA drafted its "unified plan," a series of long-term goals that called for the construction of a series of dams along the Tennessee River to provide a minimum 9-foot (2.7 m) navigation channel along the entire length of the river, control flooding in the Tennessee Valley, and bring electricity to the area. The Fort Loudoun project was initially known as the Coulter Shoals project, named for a site identified by the U.S. Army Corps of Engineers 6 miles (9.7 km) upstream from the present dam site in the early 1930s. After surveying the area, TVA moved the project to the Belle Canton Islands.

The TVA proposed the project in 1939 and it was authorized on April 18, 1940. Construction began on July 8, 1940, using much of the construction organization that had been used in previous months on TVA's Hiwassee River projects. TVA originally planned to complete the dam in 1944, but the outbreak of World War II brought increased funding and urgency, and the dam was completed and the gates closed August 2, 1943. The first generator went online November 9, 1943 and the second went online January 15, 1944.

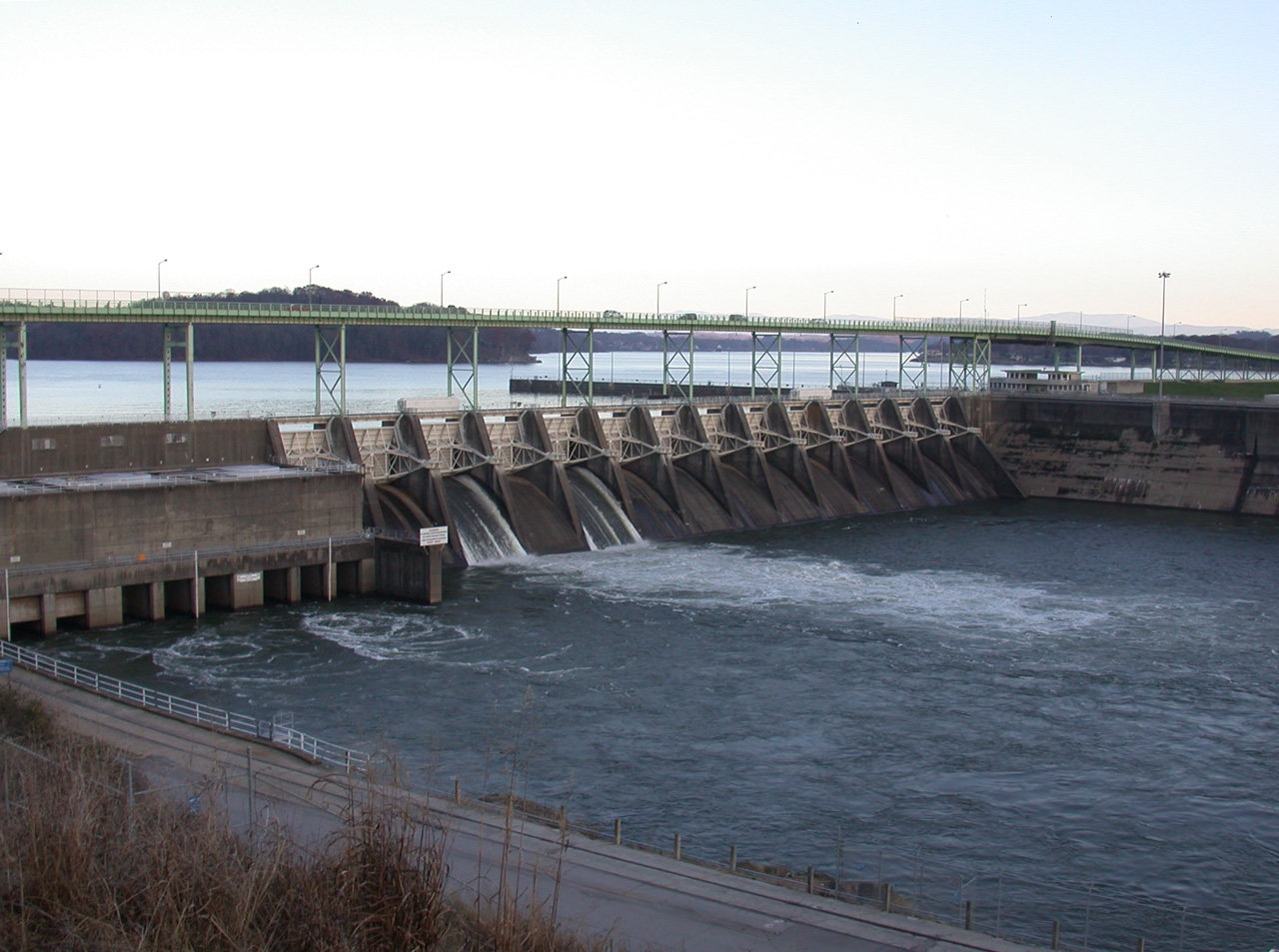
Fort Loudoun Dam, viewed from the north

The Fort Loudoun Dam project required the purchase of 16,200 acres (6,600 ha) of land and flowage rights. 317 residents, 6 cemeteries, and over 60 miles (97 km) of roads had to be relocated. Construction efforts required 582,000 cubic yards of concrete and 122,000 cubic yards of riprap. Plans originally called for the installation of four 24-megawatt units, but was modified to three 32-megawatt units after the construction of Cherokee Dam alleviated the need for flexibility. The dam's lock was designed by the Army Corps of Engineers and completed in June 1943. The reservoir submerged part of Louisville, Tennessee, and required modifications to Knoxville's riverfront.

In 1942, TVA received approval to build a dam— at the time known as the "Fort Loudoun extension"— across the mouth of the Little Tennessee River, and divert the water via canal into the Fort Loudoun Reservoir. With the new dam extension planned, TVA received authorization for a fourth 32,000-kW generator. However, the War Production Board gave the dam's third and fourth generators a "low priority" rating, which effectively killed funding for the Fort Loudoun extension, and the side project was abandoned. In the 1960s, the Fort Loudoun extension was revived as the Tellico Dam project.

== See also ==
- Dams and reservoirs of the Tennessee River
- National Register of Historic Places listings in Loudon County, Tennessee
