= Tennessee State Route 334 =

State highway in Tennessee

State Route 334
- Louisville Road
- TN 334 highlighted in red

Route information
- Maintained by TDOT
- Length: 2.5 mi (4.0 km)
- Existed: July 1, 1983–present

Major junctions
- South end: SR 335 in Alcoa
- North end: SR 333 in Louisville

Location
- Country: United States
- State: Tennessee
- Counties: Blount

Highway system
- Tennessee State Routes; Interstate; US; State
← SR 333	→ SR 335

State Route 334 (SR 334), also known as Louisville Road, is 2.5 mile long north-south state highway in Blount County, Tennessee. It serves as a connector between the town of Louisville and the city of Alcoa.

== Route description ==
SR 334 begins in northern Alcoa at an intersection with SR 335 (W Hunt Road), where the road continues south as Louisville Road into downtown. It heads northwest through suburban areas before entering farmland while passing along the southern edge of McGhee Tyson Airport. The highway continues northwest through farmland to enter Louisville and come to a roundabout with Miser Station Road and Mentor Road. SR 334 continues northwest through neighborhoods before coming to an end at an intersection with SR 333 (Louisville Road/Topside Road). The entire route of SR 334 is a two-lane highway.

== Major intersections ==
The entire route is in Blount County.

Location	mi	km	Destinations	Notes
Alcoa	0.0	0.0	SR 335 (W Hunt Road) – Maryville, Eagleton Village, McGhee Tyson Airport; Louisville Road to US 129 - Downtown Alcoa/Maryville	Southern terminus; road continues south as Louisville Road
Louisville	2.5	4.0	SR 333 (Louisville Road/Topside Road) to I-140 – Friendsville	Northern terminus
1.000 mi = 1.609 km; 1.000 km = 0.621 mi
