= Tennessee State Route 333 =

State highway in Tennessee, United States

State Route 333
- TN 333 highlighted in red

Route information
- Maintained by TDOT
- Length: 14.49 mi (23.32 km)
- Existed: July 1, 1983–present

Major junctions
- South end: US 321 in Friendsville
- I-140 in Alcoa
- North end: US 129 in Alcoa

Location
- Country: United States
- State: Tennessee
- Counties: Blount

Highway system
- Tennessee State Routes; Interstate; US; State
← SR 332	→ SR 334

State Route 333 (SR 333), is a south-to-north secondary highway in Blount County, Tennessee, that is 14.49 miles (23.32 km) long. Its southern terminus is with US 321 and near Friendsville, and its northern terminus is with US 129 in Alcoa.

== Route description ==
SR 333 begins in Friendsville at an intersection with US 321/SR 73 just southeast of downtown. It goes northwest as E Main Avenue to enter downtown, where it turns right onto N Farnum Street to pass through town before turning left onto Miser Station Road, where it leaves Friendsville and continues northeast. SR 133 continues through farmland and rural areas, where it turns left onto Quarry Road, before continuing northeast to pass through Louisville, where it has an intersection with SR 334, where it becomes Topside Road. SR 333 then has an interchange with I-140 (Exit 9) before continuing northeast to come to an end at an intersection with US 129/SR 115. The entire route of SR 333 is a 2-lane highway and runs parallel to the south shore of the Tennessee River.

== Major intersections ==
The entire route is in Blount County.

Location	mi	km	Destinations	Notes
Friendsville			US 321 (SR 73/West Lamar Alexander Parkway) – Maryville, Lenoir City	Southern terminus
Louisville			SR 334 south (Louisville Road)	Northern terminus of SR 334
Alcoa			I-140 (Pellissippi Parkway) – Maryville, Oak Ridge	I-140 exit, 9
Alcoa			US 129 (Alcoa Highway/Airport Highway/SR 115) – Knoxville, Alcoa	Northern terminus
1.000 mi = 1.609 km; 1.000 km = 0.621 mi

== See also ==
- List of Tennessee state highways
