= Pellissippi Parkway =

Highway in Tennessee, United States

Pellissippi Parkway
- I-140 highlighted in red; SR 162 in purple

Route information
- Maintained by TDOT
- Length: 19.75 mi (31.78 km)
- Existed: December 7, 1971–present
- Component highways: I-140 from Knoxville to Alcoa; SR 162 from Solway to Knoxville and within Alcoa
- NHS: Entire route

Major junctions
- Western end: SR 62 at Solway
- I-40 / I-75 in Knoxville; US 11 / US 70 in Knoxville; US 129 in Alcoa
- Current Eastern end: SR 33 in Eagleton Village

Location
- Country: United States
- State: Tennessee
- Counties: Knox, Blount

Highway system
- Interstate Highway System; Main; Auxiliary; Suffixed; Business; Future; Tennessee State Routes; Interstate; US; State
← SR 139	I-140	→ SR 140
← SR 161	SR 162	→ SR 163

The Pellissippi Parkway is a major highway in Knox and Blount counties in the Knoxville metropolitan area in Tennessee that extends 19.75 miles (31.78 km) from State Route 62 at Solway to SR 33 in Alcoa. It provides access to the cities of Oak Ridge and Maryville from Interstates 40 and 75 in the western part of Knoxville and also serves a major corridor that includes Oak Ridge National Laboratory, Y-12 National Security Complex, and a number of science and technology firms. The central portion of the Pellissippi Parkway is included in the Interstate Highway System and is designated Interstate 140 (I-140), while the remainder is designated as State Route 162 (SR 162). The entire highway is part of the National Highway System, a national network of roads identified as important to the national economy, defense, and mobility. It takes its name from an older name for the Clinch River of Native American origin.

The Pellissippi Parkway was initially constructed between I-40/I-75 and Solway from 1970 to 1973 in order to improve access between Knoxville and Oak Ridge. A proposal to extend the highway to US 129 arose while the initial section was under construction, and this occurred in multiple segments between 1987 and 1996. The parkway was extended to its current eastern terminus in two sections, which opened in 1996 and 2005, and is currently planned to be extended approximately four miles (6.4 km) to US 321. This plan has been the subject of intense community opposition from locals, however, and has been repeatedly delayed as a result.

== Route description ==
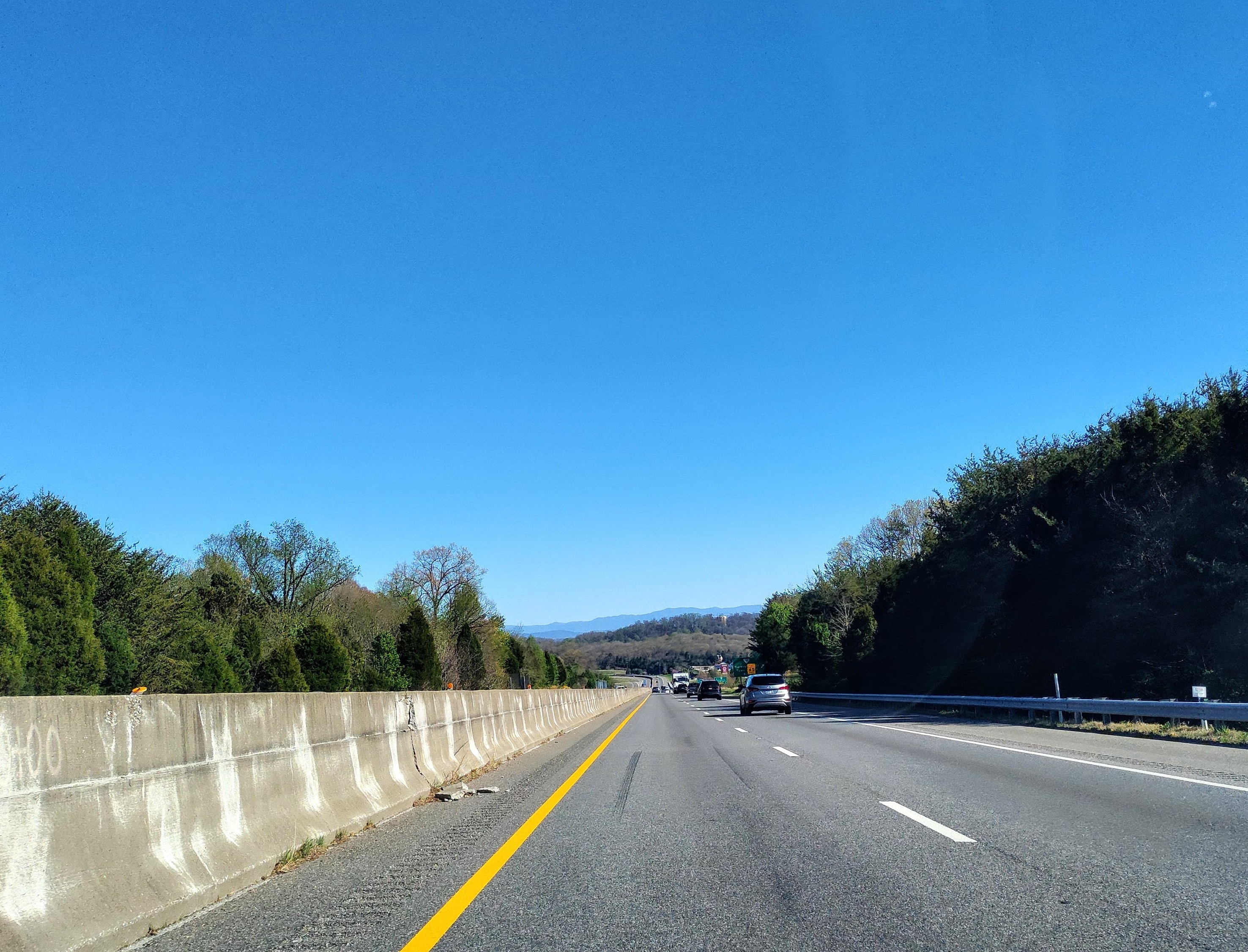
The Pellissippi Parkway (I-140 eastbound) near the SR 332 interchange

The Pellissippi Parkway comprises I-140 and two sections of SR 162 that seamlessly extend from either end of the Interstate Highway segment. The northern segment of SR 162 runs 5.84 miles (9.40 km) from SR 62 at Solway south to I-40 and I-75 in Knoxville. I-140 has a length of 11.17 miles (17.98 km) from the junction with I-40 and I-75 to US 129 in Alcoa. (Note: I-140 officially runs between the center of the overpass with I-40/I-75 and the center of the underpass with US 129. However, a sign reading "Begin I-140" is found on the Dutchtown Road overpass, approximately 1.3 miles (2.1 km) north of the western terminus of I-140, and a sign reading "Interstate ends 1/2 mile" is found on I-140 westbound near I-140 milepost 0.2. At the eastern terminus, signs reading "Begin/End I-140" are found approximately 800 feet (240 m) east of the US 129 underpass, and SR 162 southbound is also signed as I-140 eastbound from US 129 southbound at this interchange.) The southern segment of SR 162 begins at US 129 and runs 2.74 miles (4.41 km) to SR 33 within Alcoa. The entire highway is a part of the National Highway System. The northernmost 4.6 miles (7.4 km) of the parkway is a four-lane limited-access highway, and the remainder is a controlled-access highway. Running in a diagonal southeast–northwest alignment, the I-140 stretch is signed as an east–west route, and both SR 162 sections are signed as north–south. (Note: The southbound lanes of SR 162 are signed as eastbound from US 129) In 2025, annual average daily traffic volumes ranged from 82,400 vehicles north of I-40/I-75 to 14,952 vehicles at the eastern terminus.

The Pellissippi Parkway begins at a directional interchange with SR 62 (Oak Ridge Highway) at the east end of the unincorporated community of Solway in western Knox County. This is on the east side of the Clinch River a short distance from Oak Ridge. Here, there is no direct access from westbound SR 62 to the parkway. The parkway then heads southeast as a limited-access four-lane divided highway. It crosses Beaver Creek and has a five-ramp partial cloverleaf interchange with Hardin Valley Road, which provides access to Pellissippi State Community College. The Pellissippi Parkway then has another partial cloverleaf interchange with SR 131 (Lovell Road). A short distance later, the controlled-access section begins at a partial cloverleaf interchange with Dutchtown Road. Here, the Pellissippi Parkway enters the western end of the city of Knoxville and is paralleled on both sides by frontage roads south for about one mile (1.6 km) to a large interchange with I-40 and I-75. This interchange is a near-complete cloverleaf interchange, with three loop ramps and a flyover ramp from the southbound lanes of the parkway to eastbound I-40/northbound I-75, which head concurrently toward downtown Knoxville.

The Pellissippi Parkway continues south through a near-complete cloverleaf interchange with Kingston Pike about 1/2 mile (0.80 km) beyond, which carries U.S. Routes 11 and 70. Here, the city limits of Knoxville begin snaking along the freeway's right-of-way to the Tennessee River. The parkway crosses a Norfolk Southern Railway line and the Sinking Creek arm of Fort Loudon Lake ahead of its diamond interchange with Westland Drive. A short distance later, the freeway curves east within a diamond interchange with SR 332 (Northshore Drive); the interchange includes a ramp from the eastbound parkway to Town Center Boulevard, providing access to a shopping center. A few miles later the Pellissippi Parkway veers south onto a peninsula within Toole's Bend, a bend of the Tennessee River, then curves southeast and crosses the Fort Loudoun Lake impoundment of the river, which forms the Knox–Blount County line, on the Lt. Alexander "Sandy" Bonnyman Memorial Bridge. On the east side of the river, the highway enters the northern outskirts of the city of Alcoa, within which it remains to its eastern end. The freeway has a diamond interchange with SR 333 (Topside Road) and crosses a CSX rail line. The Pellissippi Parkway then curves southeast through a cloverleaf interchange with US 129 (Alcoa Highway) north of McGhee Tyson Airport. The freeway then has a southbound-only exit and northbound-only entrance with Cusick Road and crosses a final Norfolk Southern rail line before reaching its terminus at a half diamond interchange with SR 33 (Old Knoxville Highway) near the Eagleton Village community. This interchange is graded to allow future extension of the parkway.

== History ==
=== Solway to Knoxville construction ===
When Oak Ridge was established by the federal government in 1942 for the uranium enrichment operations of the Manhattan Project, SR 62 became the main route between Oak Ridge and Knoxville. After the completion of the adjoining section of I-40/I-75 in 1961, Oak Ridge officials began pushing for a connector route to the Interstate to improve access between Oak Ridge and Knoxville, citing inadequacies in the two-lane stretch of SR 62. On December 2, 1965, a delegation of Oak Ridge residents met with the Knox County Highway Technical Advisory Committee and presented their proposal for a new four-lane controlled-access highway to the Interstate, including a new bridge over the Clinch River. During the planning phase, a decision was made to have the route terminate with SR 62 at Solway. The new bridge over the Clinch River would then replace the two-lane bridge on SR 62 in a separate project. The route's alignment was approved on January 25, 1967, by the Knoxville-Knox County Highway Coordinating Committee, which allowed for it to be budgeted by the state. Other alignments would have had the route terminate at I-40/75 near the interchanges with SR 131 and Cedar Bluff Road, respectively. Initially referred to as the "Oak Ridge Connector", the highway was named the "Pellissippi Parkway" by an act of the Knox County Commission on December 7, 1971, which was subsequently recognized by the Tennessee General Assembly on March 15, 1976. Local officials and residents in 1968 and 1969 unsuccessfully tried to pressure the Tennessee Department of Highways, the predecessor agency to the Tennessee Department of Transportation (TDOT), to construct the route as a fully controlled-access highway, but they chose a limited-access design that incorporated both interchanges and at-grade intersections.

Work on the first section, located between I-40/I-75 and Hardin Valley Road, began in June 1970 and was completed in late 1972. This section was accessed via a partial Y-interchange along I-40/I-75 adjacent to the interchange with Mabry Hood Road; the Pellissippi Parkway was only accessible from the westbound lanes of the Interstate, and only the eastbound Interstate lanes were accessible from the Pellissippi Parkway. The section between Hardin Valley Road and SR 62 in Solway was completed in late 1973, after months of delays caused by rain. The highway was dedicated by Governor Winfield Dunn on May 31, 1974.

=== Extension to Alcoa ===
Although intended to initially improve access to Oak Ridge, the Pellissippi Parkway was envisioned from the start to be eventually extended from I-40/I-75 to US 129 in Alcoa in order to provide more efficient access to McGhee Tyson Airport. State plans for extending the Pellissippi Parkway first appeared in a 1973 statewide transportation program, and in April 1975, the Tennessee General Assembly passed a resolution authorizing TDOT to study the possibility of extending the route to US 129. Environmental reviews and location studies began in late 1980, and the first public hearings were held in January 1981. Then-Governor Lamar Alexander included the extension as part of a plan to develop a science and technology corridor in the region in the early 1980s.

The extension was subject to strong opposition from some locals. In 1982 a group of local residents opposed to the extension formed the Citizens against the Pellissippi Parkway Extension (CAPPE). They charged that the route would pollute the groundwater and streams in the area and that disruptions to streams would create conditions that could result in widespread flooding. They also expressed concern that the roadbed would likely be plagued by geological problems due to large numbers of sinkholes and unstable geological formations in the area. In addition, some critics alleged that Alexander, who is from Maryville, was pushing the extension for his personal financial benefit, citing land he co-owned nearby. Alexander denied these allegations—stating that he purchased the land for preservation, not development—and pointed out that the extension had been proposed since before his Governorship began.

On December 21, 1984, the alignment for the extension was selected using a combination of two of the four proposed routings. This route had been determined to circumvent all dangerous sinkholes and caves and was judged to have the least detrimental environmental impact. The final environmental impact statement was approved on September 25, 1985, and funding for the extension was authorized under the Better Roads Program of 1986, an initiative by Alexander to fund a backlog of needed road projects throughout the state. The extension was one of six freeway projects under this program, dubbed "Bicentennial Parkways", and was initially expected to cost $151.7 million (equivalent to $377 million in 2025). The program also proposed that the extension be numbered Interstate 140, which was approved by the American Association of State Highway and Transportation Officials (AASHTO) on June 15, 1992, but not allowed to be signed until it was linked to I-40/75. On December 18, 1986, a group of landowners submitted a request to TDOT for an interchange with Tooles Bend Road, but this was rejected on October 27, 1988, after several local residents and the Knox County Commission had expressed opposition earlier that year.

Construction on the extension began in January 1987, with work on the Tennessee River bridge piers. The bridge was completed in the autumn of 1989 but not opened to traffic; as a result, it faced multiple acts of trespassing and vandalism afterwards. The short segment between Wrights Ferry Road and the Tennessee River was let in May 1988 and completed in August 1990 but also not opened to traffic. In December 1989, construction began on the short segment between US 129 and Wrights Ferry Road, and eight months later, work began on the section between the river and SR 332. On December 4, 1992, the 6.6-mile (10.6 km) segment between US 129 and SR 332 opened. The next segment completed was the four-mile (6.4 km) segment between SR 332 and US 11/US 70 (Kingston Pike), which was contracted in November 1990 and opened on October 6, 1993. This segment was constructed on the former location of the Mabry Hood House, an antebellum home located on Kingston Pike that was demolished in 1983 after falling into disrepair.

The contract for the last major section of the extension, located between Kingston Pike and I-40/I-75, was awarded in September 1993 and included construction of part of the interchange with I-40/75. After repeated delays, this section opened on December 16, 1996, along with four ramps connecting to I-40/75, one of which was temporary. At this time, an uninterrupted access-controlled connection between the extension and original parkway did not yet exist, requiring traffic north of I-40/75 to enter what was the original parkway connection to I-40/75 via a temporary at-grade intersection. The final phase, which began in June 1995 and was completed in late 1998, after multiple delays, completed the interchange with I-40/75 and constructed new carriageways from this interchange to north of Dutchtown Road, replacing the at-grade intersection. As part of this project, the flyover ramp from the southbound lanes of the parkway was rebuilt, nearby frontage roads were modified, the at-grade intersection with Dutchtown Road was converted into an interchange, and the nearby Mabry Hood Road interchange on I-40/75 was removed.

=== Extension to US 321 and controversies ===
Although the initial plan was to extend the Pellissippi Parkway to US 129, a concept for extending the route to US 321 (Lamar Alexander Parkway) near Walland has existed since March 1977, when Blount County, Maryville, and Alcoa officials jointly requested funding for the then-proposed extension from the Tennessee General Assembly. The approximately seven-mile (11 km) extension to US 321 was included in a preliminary draft of the Better Roads Program in January 1986 but was removed by Governor Alexander two months later, who stated that it would not be included in any proposals during his administration. After Alexander left office the following year, the extension began to be listed as a long-term plan and was first added to the Knoxville Regional Transportation Planning Organization's long-range transportation plan in 1995. After the completion of the stretch to US 129, Alcoa officials began lobbying for the extension to US 321, arguing that the eastern terminus had become a bottleneck. The first stretch of this extension, the 1.1-mile (1.8 km) segment between US 129 and Cusick Road, was contracted in December 1995 and opened on December 19, 1996, and was partially funded by the city of Alcoa. Work on the next section, located between Cusick Road and SR 33, began in November 2000 and was completed on August 15, 2005. The final section is a proposed 4.4-mile (7.1 km) extension past SR 33 to US 321, which would include an interchange with US 411.

This final section has been met with much controversy and opposition from locals, causing multiple delays, redesigns, and court reviews. In 1999, TDOT conducted an environmental assessment to evaluate alternatives to the project. On April 24, 2002, the Federal Highway Administration (FHWA) issued a "finding of no significant impact" (FONSI), which would have allowed TDOT to proceed with the project. On June 7, 2002, a group of local citizens, who had reorganized Citizens Against the Pellissippi Parkway Extension (CAPPE), filed a lawsuit against TDOT, the FHWA, and the U.S. Department of Transportation, arguing that the FONSI violated provisions of the National Environmental Policy Act that require an environmental impact statement. On June 22, the FHWA informed TDOT of an intent to suspend federal funding for the extension in response to the lawsuit. On July 17, Judge Todd J. Campbell of the U.S. District Court for the Middle District of Tennessee issued an injunction against TDOT, prohibiting them from proceeding with construction activities. On August 29, the FHWA notified TDOT that they were withdrawing the FONSI, but this action was blocked by the District Court on October 1, due to TDOT's intent to proceed with the project without federal funding. On July 7, 2004, the Sixth Circuit Court of Appeals reversed the District Court's ruling and modified the injunction one month later to allow TDOT to prepare an environmental impact statement. On September 27, 2004, TDOT announced plans to do so.

The draft environmental impact statement was approved on April 14, 2010. On July 27, 2013, TDOT announced that the alignment for the extension, which includes a westward shift of the southern end from the original plan, had been chosen. The final environmental impact statement was approved on September 10, 2015, and the FHWA approved the route on August 31, 2017. This extension, which TDOT is not expected to be able to begin construction on for many more years, has continued to be met with fierce community opposition, however.

=== Other history ===
On September 7, 1997, the bridge over the Tennessee River was dedicated as the Alexander "Sandy" Bonnyman Medal of Honor Memorial Bridge in honor of a United States Marine Corps officer who was killed in action in the Battle of Tarawa during World War II.

Between December 2, 2009, and June 30, 2010, the southbound on-ramp from SR 131 was lengthened and straightened, which required closing the ramp to all traffic and widening of the overpass, removing a hazardous accident-prone merge with the parkway. In June 2020, work began to modify the interchange with Hardin Valley Road by lengthening and straightening the ramps, adding turn lanes to the ramps, removing an intersection with the northbound ramps, placing a concrete island between the on- and off-ramps, and adding a new northbound entrance ramp from Hardin Valley Road westbound. The project was completed in January 2022.

== Etymology ==
The Pellissippi Parkway, alongside other landmarks throughout Eastern Tennessee, derives its name from an older name for the Clinch River. The name "Pelisipi River" was present on older maps with such variant spellings as "Pelisippi" and "Pellissippi", and the variant form "Fiume Pelissipi". In fact, the Mitchell Map (1755–1757) labels a tributary of the "Pelisipi River" as "Clinch's River". The word "Pellissippi" was long said to have been the Cherokee name for the river and was purported to mean "winding waters" in the Cherokee language. However, research completed in 2017 instead concludes that the Miami-Illinois name Mosopeleacipi ("river of the Mosopelea" tribe) was first applied to what is now called the Ohio River. Shortened in the Shawnee language to pelewa thiipi, spelewathiipi, or peleewa thiipiiki, the name evolved through other variant forms, such as "Polesipi", "Peleson", "Pele Sipi", and "Pere Sipi", and eventually stabilized to the "Pelisipi/Pelisippi/Pellissippi" form; these names were variously applied back and forth between the Ohio and Clinch rivers.

== Exit list ==
County	Location	mi (Note: All numbered exits, except for the eastern terminus, are located on I-140 and are numbered according to its mileage)	km	Exit	Destinations	Notes
Knox	Solway	0.00	0.00		SR 62 (Oak Ridge Highway) – Oak Ridge, Karns	Northern terminus of SR 162; directional interchange; no direct access from westbound SR 62 to southbound SR 162
Knox		2.47	3.98	–	Hardin Valley Road – Pellissippi State Community College	Partial cloverleaf interchange; beginning of limited-access highway
Knox		3.74	6.02	–	SR 131 (Lovell Road) – Tusculum College	Partial cloverleaf interchange
Knox	Knoxville	4.67	7.52	–	Dutchtown Road	Partial cloverleaf interchange; beginning of, controlled-access highway
Knox	Knoxville	5.84	9.40	1 C-D	I-40 / I-75 – Knoxville, Nashville, Chattanooga	Southern terminus of northern segment of SR 162; western terminus of I-140; split into exits 1C (I-40 east / I-75 north) and 1D (I-40 west / I-75 south) westbound; I-40/75 exits 376A-B
Knox	Knoxville	6.42	10.33	1 A-B	US 11 / US 70 (Kingston Pike/SR 1)	Split into exits 1A (US 11 north / US 70 east) and 1B eastbound (US 11 south / US 70 west)
Knox	Knoxville	8.78	14.13	3	Westland Drive	
Knox	Knoxville	10.53	16.95	5	SR 332 (Northshore Drive) / Town Center Boulevard	Access to Town Center Boulevard from eastbound I-140 only
Tennessee River, Fort Loudoun Lake		14.46– 14.79	23.27– 23.80	Lt. Alexander "Sandy" Bonnyman Memorial Bridge; Knox–Blount County line		
Blount	Alcoa	15.60	25.11	9	SR 333 (Topside Road) – Louisville	
Blount	Alcoa	17.01	27.37	11 A-B	US 129 (Alcoa Highway/SR 115) – Alcoa, Maryville, Knoxville	Eastern terminus of I-140; northern terminus of southern segment of SR 162; split into exits 11A (south) and 11B (north)
Blount	Alcoa	17.98	28.94	–	Cusick Road	Southbound exit and northbound entrance only, no exit number
Blount	Eagleton Village	19.75	31.78	14	SR 33 (Old Knoxville Highway) – Rockford, Maryville, Eagleton Village	Current southern terminus of SR 162 and Pellissippi Parkway
Blount	Maryville			17	US 411 (Sevierville Road/SR 35) – Maryville, Seymour, Sevierville	Future interchange; part of proposed future extension of SR 162.
Blount	Maryville				US 321 (Lamar Alexander Parkway/SR 73) – Maryville, Townsend, Pigeon Forge	Proposed future southern terminus of SR 162.
1.000 mi = 1.609 km; 1.000 km = 0.621 mi: Incomplete access; Proposed; Route transition
