= Alexander Bonnyman Jr. =

Marine Corps Medal of Honor recipient (1910–1943)

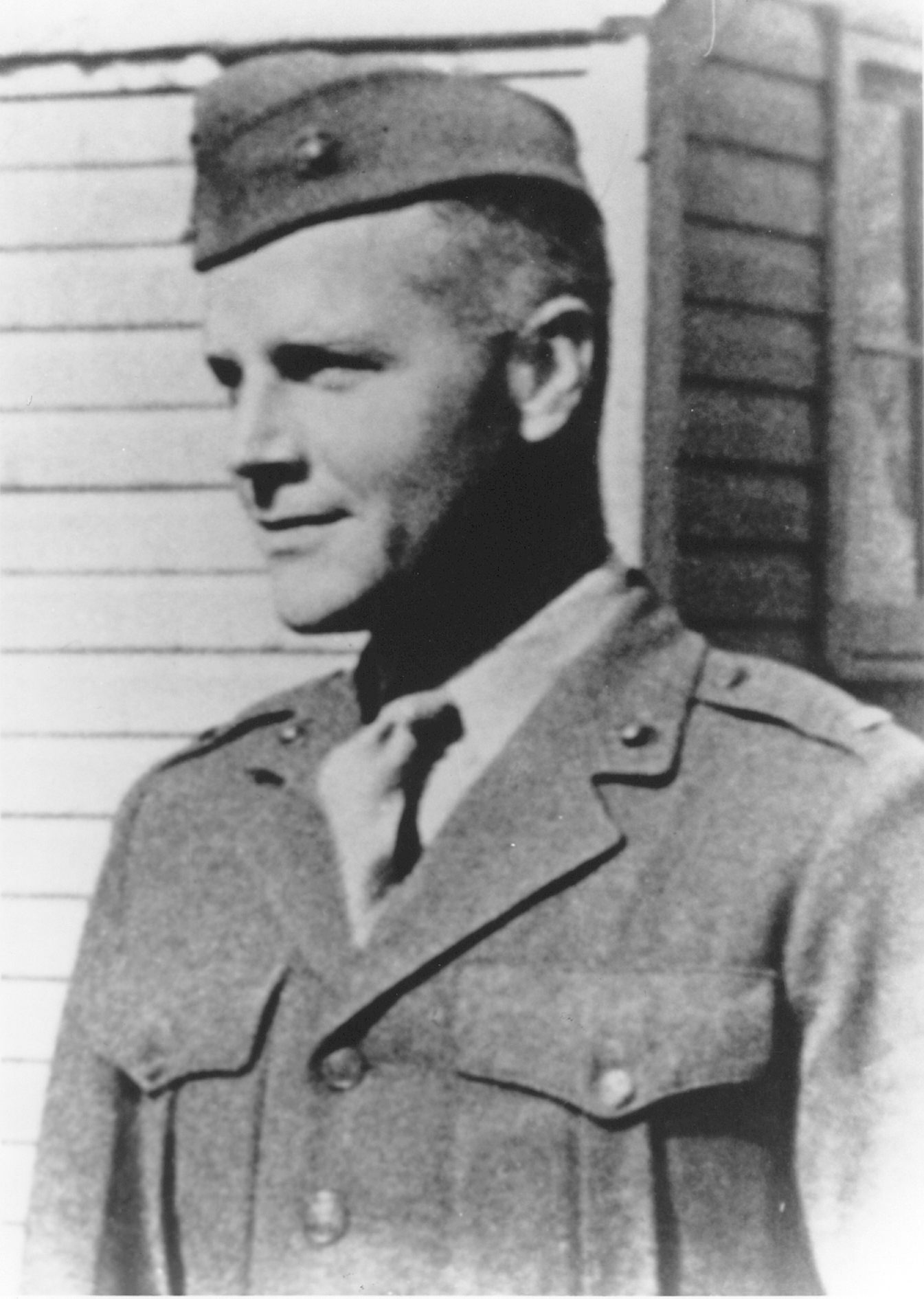
- Medal of Honor recipient Alexander Bonnyman Jr.
- Born: May 2, 1910; Atlanta, Georgia
- Died: November 23, 1943 (aged 33); Betio, Gilbert Islands
- Burial place: Berry Highland Memorial Gardens, Knoxville, Tennessee
- Military career
- Allegiance: United States of America
- Branch: United States Marine Corps
- Service years: 1942–1943
- Rank: First Lieutenant
- Nickname: "Sandy"
- Units: 2nd Battalion, 8th Marines, 2nd Marine Division
- Conflicts: World War II: Guadalcanal Campaign; Battle of Tarawa †
- Awards: Medal of Honor; Purple Heart

Alexander "Sandy" Bonnyman Jr. (May 2, 1910 – November 23, 1943) was a United States Marine Corps officer who was killed in action on Betio Atoll in the Gilbert Islands during World War II.

A combat engineer, he received the Medal of Honor and Purple Heart posthumously for his actions during an important assault on a Japanese bombproof shelter during the Battle of Tarawa.

== Early life and career ==
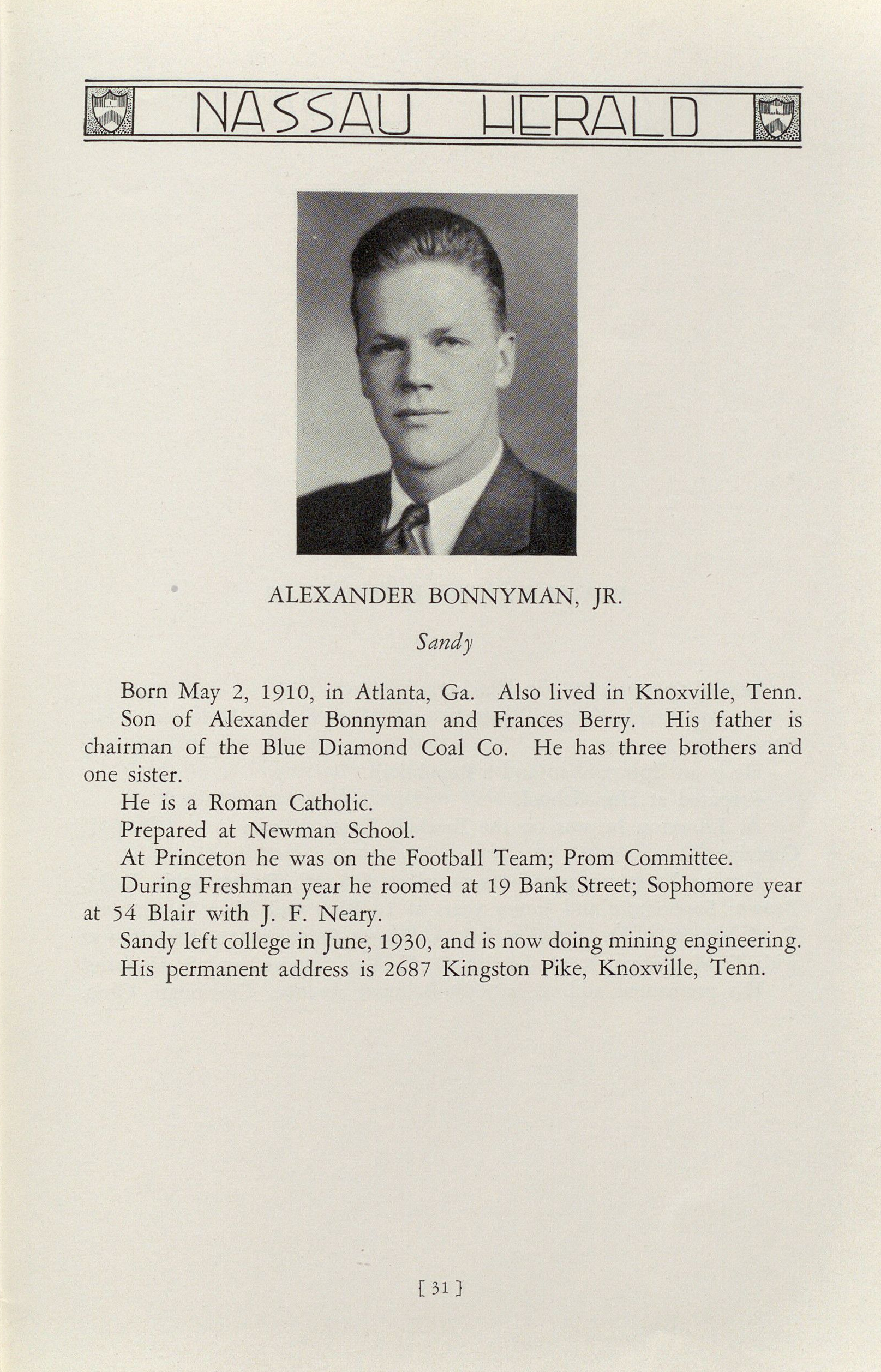
Bonnyman in the Princeton University yearbook, 1932

Born on May 2, 1910, in Atlanta, Georgia, Bonnyman's family moved to Knoxville, Tennessee, when he was a baby. His father was the president of Knoxville's Blue Diamond Coal Company.

Bonnyman attended Princeton University where he studied engineering and played football. Dropping out of college after his sophomore year, he signed up for the Army Air Corps and entered flight training in June 1932. He was discharged three months later "By reason of flying deficiency," though his character was rated as "excellent." He then worked in the coal industry before moving to New Mexico, where he started a copper mining business.

== Marine Corps service ==
At the outbreak of the war, Bonnyman was exempt from any military obligation due to his role in running a company producing strategically vital material for the war effort. Nevertheless, he enlisted in the U.S. Marine Corps as a private in Phoenix, Arizona. Bonnyman received his recruit training at Marine Corps Recruit Depot San Diego, California.

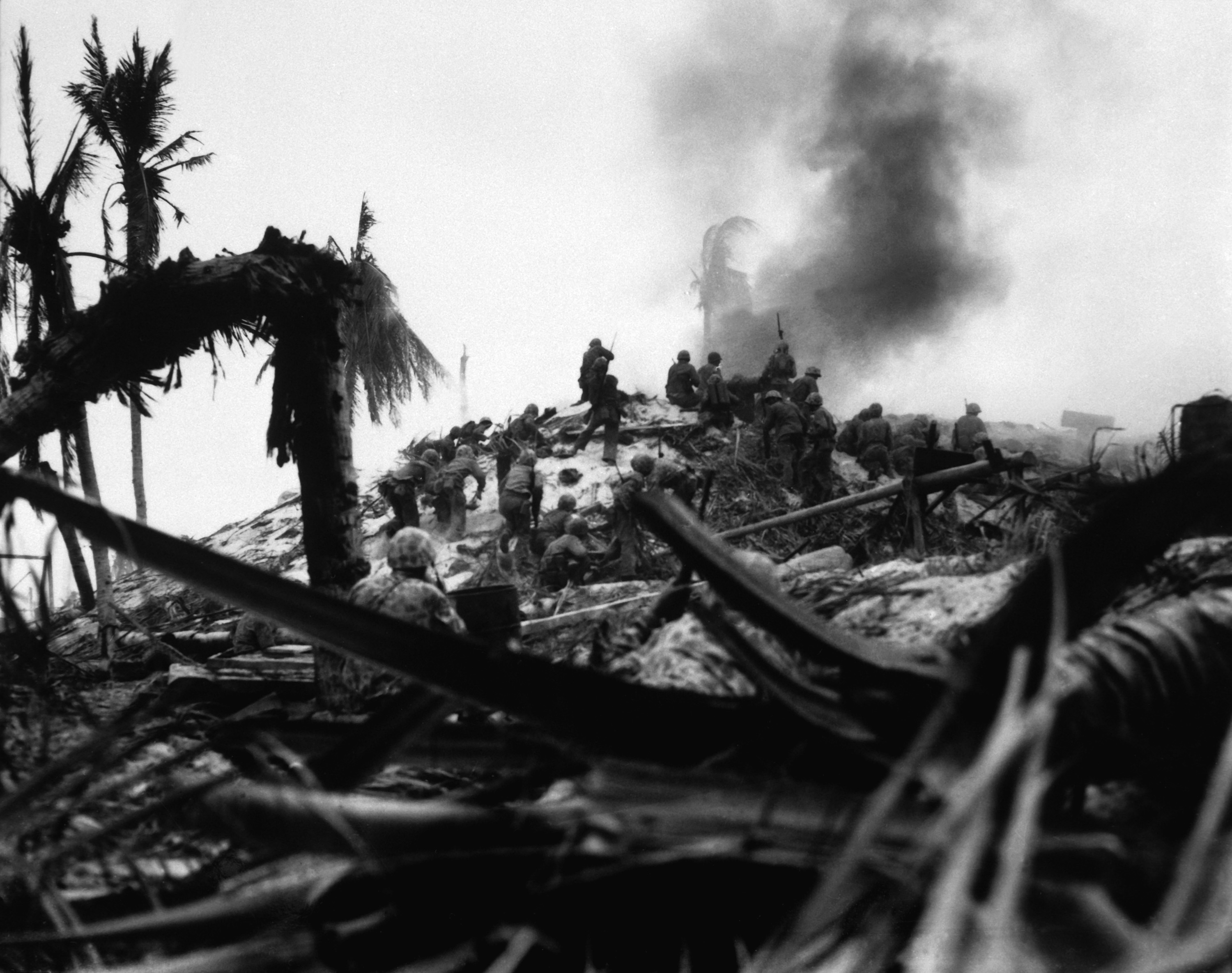
Bonnyman (4th from right) and his assault party storming Japanese stronghold

In October 1942, Bonnyman sailed for the South Pacific aboard the SS Matsonia. He distinguished himself at the Battle of Guadalcanal as part of a Marine pioneer unit (lightly equipped combat engineers). In February 1943, he received a battlefield commission to the rank of second lieutenant in recognition of what his superiors described as exceptional leadership skills.

Bonnyman's civilian background, temperament and skills would come to play an important role at Tarawa in November 1943, where he was assigned to a shore party handling beachhead logistics. When the assault troops were pinned down by heavy enemy artillery fire at the seaward end of the long Betio Pier, on his own initiative Bonnyman organized and led five men over the open pier to the beach. There he voluntarily obtained flame throwers and demolitions and directed the blowing up of several hostile installations.

On the second day of the struggle, Bonnyman, determined to breach the enemy's strong defensive line, led a demolition team of 21 Marines in an assault on the entrance to a huge bombproof shelter which contained approximately 150 Japanese soldiers. The enemy position was about forty yards forward of the Marine lines. Bonnyman advanced his team to the mouth of the position and killed many of the defenders. His team was forced to withdraw to replenish its supply of ammunition and grenades. Bonnyman again pressed his attack and gained the top of the structure, thereby flushing more than one hundred of its occupants into the open where they were cut down by Marine infantry and a supporting tank. When the Japanese returned fire, Bonnyman stood on the forward edge of the position and killed three of the attackers, but was himself killed as he ordered more charges brought forward. The battle continued for another 10–15 minutes, with all of the Japanese defenders flushed out. Of Bonnyman's original assault party of 21 Marines, 13 had survived. Betio Island was declared secured on the same day.

Parts of Bonnyman's actions were captured on film by combat cameraman Norman Hatch and featured in the documentary, With the Marines at Tarawa, making it the first Medal of Honor action captured on film.

=== Medal of Honor ===
For his actions during the battle, Bonnyman was posthumously awarded the Medal of Honor. The medal was formally presented to his family by Secretary of the Navy James Forrestal in 1947. His 12-year-old daughter, Frances, accepted the medal on behalf of the Bonnyman family.

=== Remains ===
According to the Defense Missing Personnel Office, Bonnyman's remains were "non-recovered". After the war, the Graves Registration Service recorded his body as having been buried at sea, however this report was later determined to be unfounded.

The remains of 36 Marines, including Bonnyman's, were interred in a battlefield cemetery whose location was lost by the end of the war. The cemetery was located in March 2015 by History Flight, Inc., a Florida-based nonprofit that has recovered more than 70 sets of now-identified remains from Betio.

Bonnyman's grandson, Clay Bonnyman Evans, a volunteer with History Flight, was present when Lt. Bonnyman's remains were exposed on May 28, 2015, and exhumed on May 29, and recorded the recovery via video and still photographs. Evans' book, Bones of My Grandfather: Reclaiming a Lost Hero of World War II, which recounts his grandfather's life story and the history of the recovery efforts, was published July 10, 2018.

On 26 July 2015, the bodies were repatriated to the United States, arriving at Joint Base Pearl Harbor–Hickam in Honolulu Hawaii. On August 27, 2015, his remains were identified and on September 25, 2015, he was returned to his childhood home town of Knoxville, Tennessee. He was interred with full military honors and an overflight of Marine Corps Cobra helicopters in "missing man formation" next to his parents and siblings at West Knoxville's Berry Highland Memorial Cemetery on September 27, 2015.

== Awards and honors ==
The Pellissippi Parkway bridge over the Tennessee River on the Knox-Blount county line in Tennessee is designated the Lt. Alexander "Sandy" Bonnyman Memorial Bridge in his memory. The bowling alley aboard Marine Corps Base Camp Lejeune is also named in his memory. The Strategic Sealift ship MV 1st Lt. Alex Bonnyman (T-AK 3003), a Corporal Louis J. Hauge Jr.-class vessel, was named in his honor.

Medal of Honor
Purple Heart	Combat Action Ribbon	Navy Presidential Unit Citation
American Campaign Medal	Asiatic-Pacific Campaign Medal w/ 3 service stars	World War II Victory Medal

=== Medal of Honor citation ===
The President of the United States takes pride in presenting the MEDAL OF HONOR posthumously to

FIRST LIEUTENANT ALEXANDER BONNYMAN JR.
UNITED STATES MARINE CORPS RESERVE

for service as set forth in the following CITATION:

For conspicuous gallantry and intrepidity at the risk of his life above and beyond the call of duty as Executive Officer of the 2d Battalion Shore Party, 8th Marines, 2d Marine Division, during the assault against enemy Japanese-held Tarawa in the Gilbert Islands, 20–22 November 1943. Acting on his own initiative when assault troops were pinned down at the far end of Betio Pier by the overwhelming fire of Japanese shore batteries, 1st Lt. Bonnyman repeatedly defied the blasting fury of the enemy bombardment to organize and lead the besieged men over the long, open pier to the beach and then, voluntarily obtaining flame throwers and demolitions, organized his pioneer shore party into assault demolitionists and directed the blowing of several hostile installations before the close of D-day. Determined to effect an opening in the enemy's strongly organized defense line the following day, he voluntarily crawled approximately 40 yards forward of our lines and placed demolitions in the entrance of a large Japanese emplacement as the initial move in his planned attack against the heavily garrisoned, bombproof installation which was stubbornly resisting despite the destruction early in the action of a large number of Japanese who had been inflicting heavy casualties on our forces and holding up our advance. Withdrawing only to replenish his ammunition, he led his men in a renewed assault, fearlessly exposing himself to the merciless slash of hostile fire as he stormed the formidable bastion, directed the placement of demolition charges in both entrances and seized the top of the bombproof position, flushing more than 100 of the enemy who were instantly cut down, and effecting the annihilation of approximately 150 troops inside the emplacement. Assailed by additional Japanese after he had gained his objective, he made a heroic stand on the edge of the structure, defending his strategic position with indomitable determination in the face of the desperate charge and killing 3 of the enemy before he fell, mortally wounded. By his dauntless fighting spirit, unrelenting aggressiveness and forceful leadership throughout 3 days of unremitting, violent battle, 1st Lt. Bonnyman had inspired his men to heroic effort, enabling them to beat off the counterattack and break the back of hostile resistance in that sector for an immediate gain of 400 yards with no further casualties to our forces in this zone. He gallantly gave his life for his country.

HARRY S. TRUMAN

== See also ==
- List of Medal of Honor recipients for World War II
