= Louisville, Tennessee =

Louisville
- Town
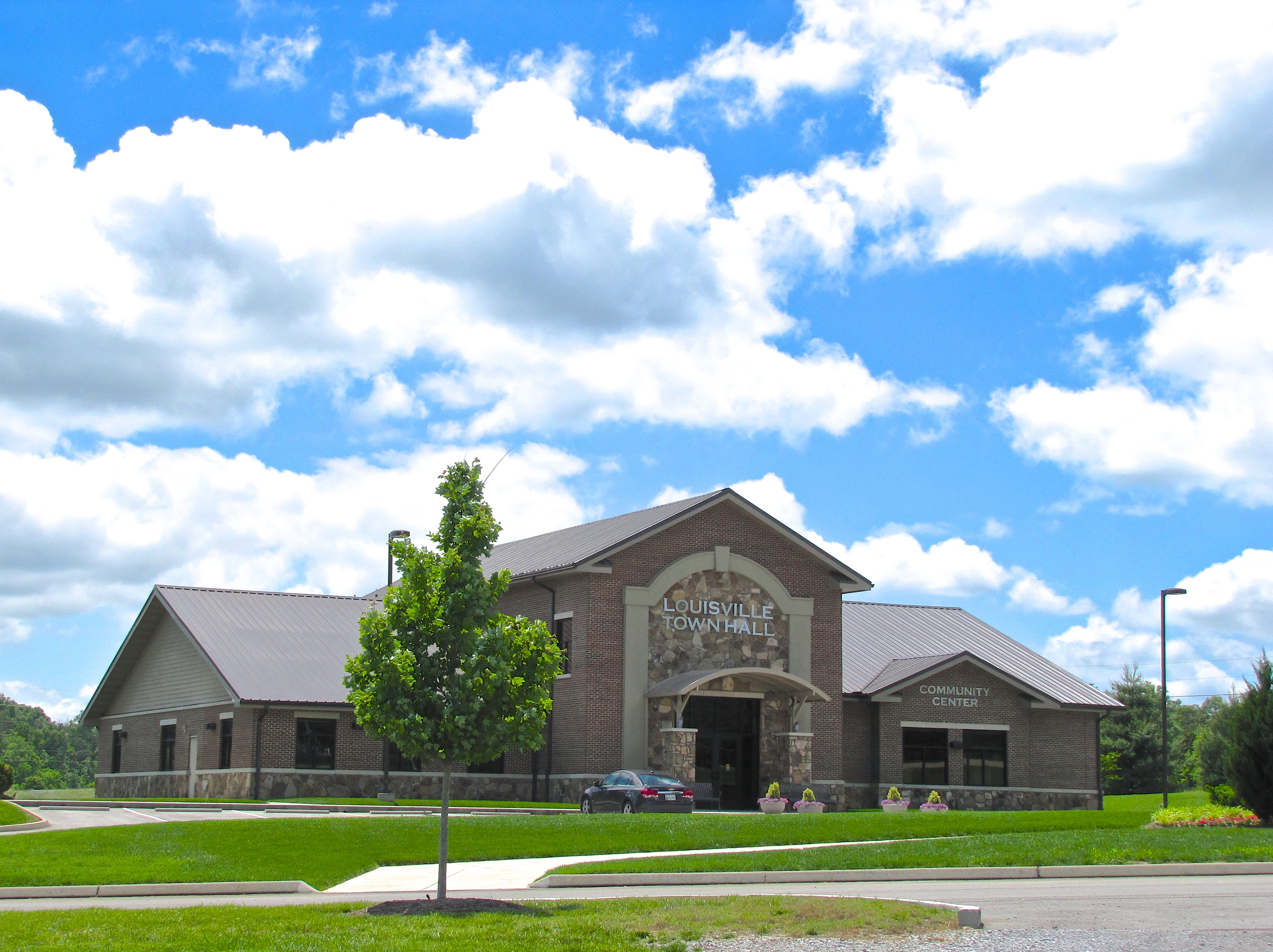
- Louisville Town Hall

- Flag Seal

- Location of Louisville in Blount County, Tennessee.
- Coordinates: 35°49′29″N 84°03′19″W
- Country: United States
- State: Tennessee
- County: Blount

Government Home Rule Charter
  - Type: Mayor-Aldermen

Area
  - Total: 17.05 sq mi (44.17 km^{2})
  - Land: 14.92 sq mi (38.64 km^{2})
  - Water: 2.14 sq mi (5.53 km^{2})
- Elevation: 817 ft (249 m)

Population (2020)
  - Total: 4,384
  - Density: 293.8/sq mi (113.44/km^{2})
- Time zone: UTC-5 (Eastern (EST))
  - Summer (DST): UTC-4 (EDT)
- ZIP code: 37777
- Area code: 865
- FIPS code: 47-43820
- GNIS feature ID: 2404960
- Website: www.louisvilletn.gov

Louisville is a suburban town in Blount County, Tennessee. Its population was 4,384 at the 2020 census. It is included in the Knoxville, Tennessee Metropolitan Statistical Area.

== History ==
The Louisville area was settled in the early 1800s, and its situation on the Tennessee River helped it grow into a key flatboat and steamboat port. It was incorporated in 1851. In 1974 Louisville's downtown was declared a national historic district by the National Register of Historic Places.

== Geography ==
Louisville is located along the northern border of Blount County. The town is centered around the junction of State Route 334 (Louisville Road), which connects Louisville with Alcoa and Maryville to the east, and State Route 333, which connects Louisville with Friendsville to the west. The Fort Loudoun Lake impoundment of the Tennessee River comprises Louisville's northern border.

According to the United States Census Bureau, the city has a total area of 13.5 square miles (35.0 km^{2}), of which 11.7 square miles (30.4 km^{2}) is land and 1.8 square miles (4.6 km^{2}), or 13.18%, is water.

== Demographics ==
Historical population
Census	Pop.	Note	%±
1880	215		—
1890	314		46.0%
2000	2,001		—
2010	2,439		21.9%
2020	4,384		79.7%

=== 2020 census ===
Louisville racial composition
Race	Number	Percentage
White (non-Hispanic)	3,975	90.67%
Black or African American (non-Hispanic)	80	1.82%
Native American	14	0.32%
Asian	29	0.66%
Other/Mixed	175	3.99%
Hispanic or Latino	111	2.53%

As of the 2020 United States census, there was a population of 4,384, with 1,753 households and 1,276 families residing in the city.

=== 2000 census ===
As of the census of 2000, there was a population of 2,001, with 808 households and 581 families residing in the city. The population density was 172.8 inhabitants per square mile (66.7/km^{2}). There were 886 housing units at an average density of 76.5 per square mile (29.5/km^{2}). The racial makeup of the city was 95.85% White, 2.15% African American, 0.35% Native American, 0.50% Asian, 0.25% from other races, and 0.90% from two or more races. Hispanic or Latino of any race were 0.90% of the population.

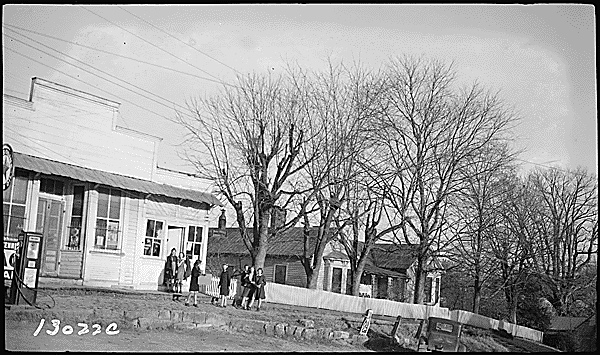
Louisville in 1942

There were 808 households, out of which 28.5% had children under the age of 18 living with them, 61.4% were married couples living together, 6.8% had a female householder with no husband present, and 28.0% were non-families. 24.4% of all households were made up of individuals, and 8.0% had someone living alone who was 65 years of age or older. The average household size was 2.44 and the average family size was 2.91.

In the city the population was spread out, with 22.4% under the age of 18, 6.6% from 18 to 24, 29.5% from 25 to 44, 29.8% from 45 to 64, and 11.7% who were 65 years of age or older. The median age was 40 years. For every 100 females, there were 96.8 males. For every 100 females age 18 and over, there were 96.1 males.

The median income for a household in the city was $40,950, and the median income for a family was $53,558. Males had a median income of $34,688 versus $26,010 for females. The per capita income for the city was $22,086. About 8.2% of families and 12.1% of the population were below the poverty line, including 20.9% of those under age 18 and 11.3% of those age 65 or over.

== Schools ==
=== Public ===
- Middlesettlements Elementary School (Blount County Schools system, K-5)

=== Private ===
- New Horizon Montessori School (grades pre-K through 5)
- Montessori Middle School (grades 6-8)
- Peninsula Village School (ages 13–18)

== Notable person ==
- Milburn White, member of the Tennessee House of Representatives

== Works cited ==
- Cornwell, Ilene (1988). Biographical Directory of the Tennessee General Assembly Volume III: 1901-1931. Tennessee Historical Commission. ISBN 0874020085.
