= Flag of Louisville, Kentucky =

City of Louisville and Jefferson County
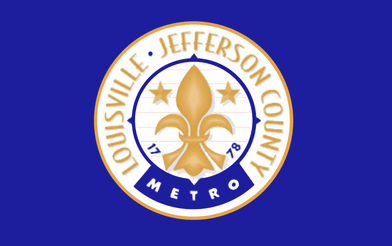
- Adopted: 2003
- Design: A blue field with a variant of the Seal of Louisville in the center

The city of Louisville, Kentucky used two flags: the original design paid homage to Louis XVI of France and the thirteen states present when the city was founded, and the current design was adopted in 2003 when the city merged with Jefferson County, Kentucky.

== Current flag ==
The municipal flag of Louisville consists of a golden fleur-de-lis with two stars surrounded by the circular Louisville • Jefferson County METRO on a blue background. The year 1778 is also centrally located, signifying the city's founding. This flag has been used since the merger of the old city of Louisville with Jefferson County in 2003. The artwork was designed by Louisville native and art director, William Glenn Hack.

== Former flags ==
The former flag of Louisville

The flag previously used by the city consists of 13 white stars arranged in a circular pattern in the upper-left corner with three golden fleur-de-lis in the lower-right on a navy blue background. The stars represent the 13 states which existed at Louisville's founding in 1778, while Kentucky was part of Virginia. The fleur-de-lis honor King Louis XVI of France, after whom Louisville was named because France's support during the American Revolution. The arrangement of the fleur-de-lis comes from the coat of arms and banner of the House of Bourbon. It was ranked as the ninth best city flag in the United States in a national survey conducted in 2003 and released in 2004. It was replaced by the current design when the city merged with Jefferson County.

== See also ==
- Seal of Louisville, Kentucky
