= Tennessee State Route 332 =

State highway in Tennessee, United States

State Route 332
- TN 332 highlighted in red

Route information
- Maintained by TDOT
- Length: 14.23 mi (22.90 km)
- Existed: July 1, 1983–present

Major junctions
- West end: US 11 / US 70 (Kingston Pike) in Farragut
- I-140 in Knoxville
- East end: I-40 / I-75 in Knoxville

Location
- Country: United States
- State: Tennessee
- Counties: Knox

Highway system
- Tennessee State Routes; Interstate; US; State
← SR 331	→ SR 333

State Route 332 (SR 332) is a west to east secondary highway in Knox County in the U.S. state of Tennessee.

The route is 14 miles (23 km) long. Its western terminus is in Farragut, Tennessee at State Route 1 (Kingston Pike). Its eastern terminus is in Knoxville at Papermill Road and Interstate 40/75. The highway is known as Concord Road from Farragut to Concord and as Northshore Drive from Concord to and through Knoxville.

== Junction list ==
The entire route is in Knox County.

Location	mi	km	Destinations	Notes
Farragut	0.0	0.0	US 11 / US 70 (Kingston Pike/SR 1) – Knoxville, Lenoir City, Kingston	Western terminus
Knoxville			I-140 (Pellissippi Parkway) – Oak Ridge, Alcoa, Maryville, McGhee Tyson Airport	I-140 exit 5
Knoxville			US 11 / US 70 (Kingston Pike/SR 1) – Knoxville, Farragut	
Knoxville	14.23	22.90	I-40 / I-75 – Nashville, Chattanooga, Knoxville	I-40/75 exit 383; eastern terminus
1.000 mi = 1.609 km; 1.000 km = 0.621 mi
