= Seal of Louisville, Kentucky =

Seal of Louisville
- Armiger: Craig Greenberg, Mayor of Louisville
- Adopted: 2003
- Supporter: None
- Use: City flag, official correspondence, insignia of city agencies and institutions

The Seal of Louisville is an emblem used as a visual representation for the city of Louisville, Kentucky. Among other reasons, the seal is used to stamp documents to certify their authenticity. The city had four seals from its formation in 1828 to 2003 before its merger with the Jefferson County, Kentucky government and creating a new joint seal, which was designed during a citywide competition by Louisville native and art director William Glenn Hack.

== History ==
The first seal established in 1828 had a steamboat ascending the falls heading to a wharf laden with boxes and bales. It was engraved with the words "City of Louisville" at the top and "Perseverando" at the bottom. Perseverando was said to mean "By Persevering" and was a part of the city motto "Industry and punctuality by persevering." This seal would be used until May 6, 1861, when the city council would approve a new seal. The new seal would be inspired by the emergence of the steam locomotive and the Louisville & Nashville Railroad. It entailed a locomotive with the words "Progress" included.

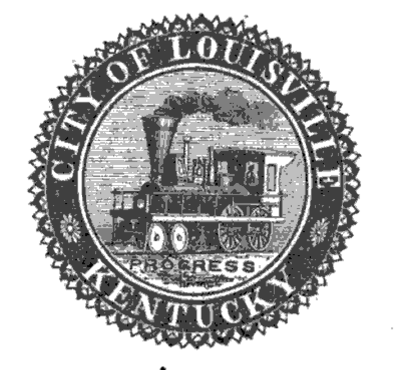
Seal of Louisville, 1861–1910

The second seal would remain in place for forty-nine years before the year 1910 when citizens started to feel that the locomotive became an outdated symbol for progress. Consequently, the Louisville Convention and Publicity League held a contest to design a new seal. John T. Bauscher won with the design featuring a lady holding a banner with the word "progress" on it in one hand and the other hand overflowing with cornucopia. A train and steamboat were on the sides of her and a tall building was depicted in the background with the words "The Nation's Thorough-fare" on it. This third seal was enacted on December 21, 1910, by the city council.

Previous seal of Louisville

On November 25, 1953, a new seal designed by Austrian typographer Victor Hammer was adopted following mayor Charles Farnsley's campaign for a simpler seal. This seal was based on the city's origin of its name by implementing three fleur-de-lis in a triangle in the center representing a century of history for each. They were surrounded by thirteen stars representing the original states of the nation and the year 1778 marking the first settlements of the Louisville area. The fleur-de-lis meaning "Lily Flower" was the symbol of King Louis XVI of France, the namesake for Louisville.

The current seal used represents Louisville and Jefferson County following the merger of the governments on January 6, 2003. The seal reads "Louisville – Jefferson County" in a circle around a single fleur-de-lis with two stars and includes the year 1778 (the year Louisville was founded) on both sides. This seal was designed during a citywide competition by Louisville native and art director William Glenn Hack.

== See also ==
- Flag of Louisville, Kentucky
- Government of Louisville, Kentucky
- Seal of Kentucky
