= Fort Loudoun Lake =

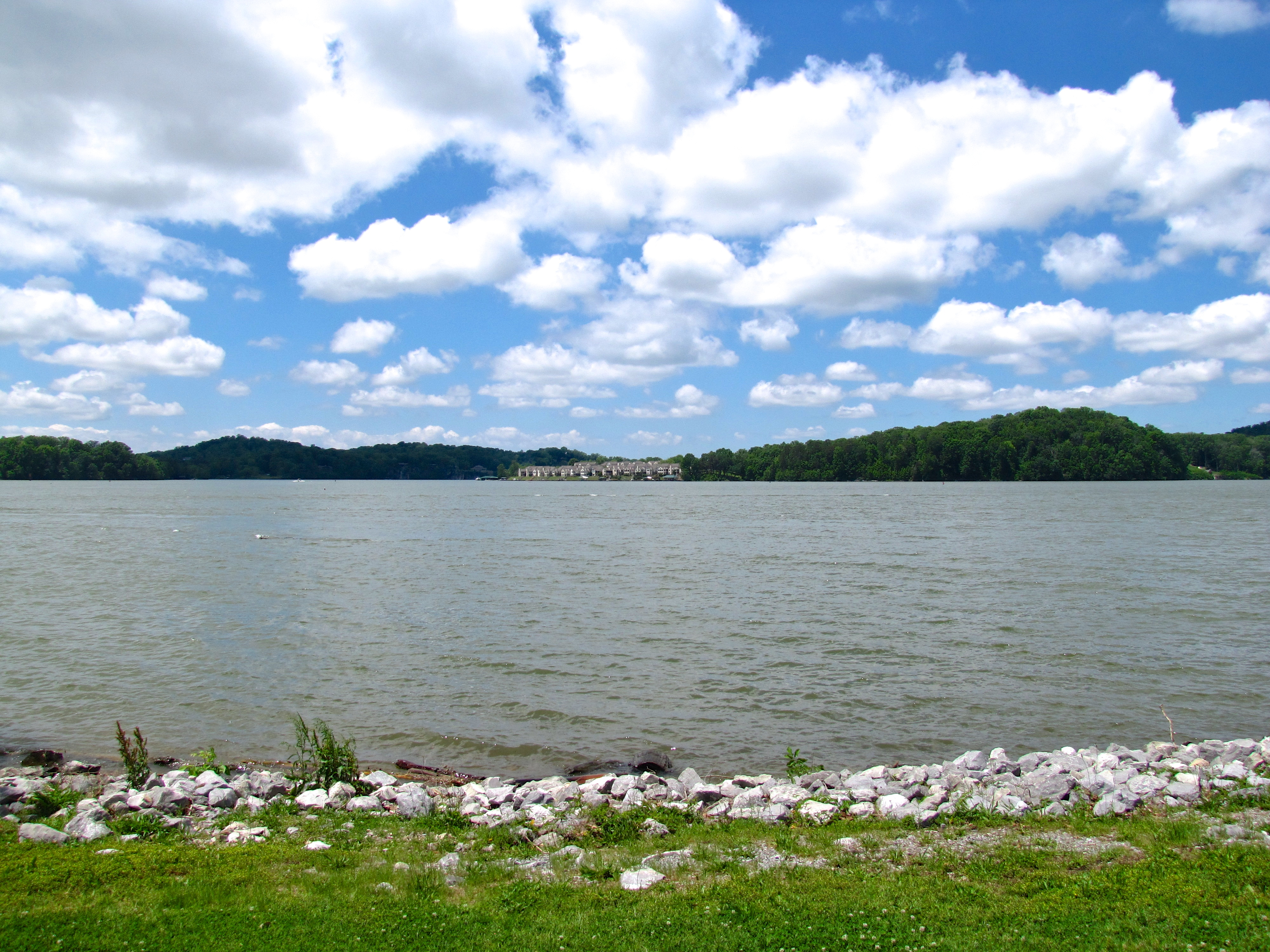
- The lake in Louisville, Tennessee

- Location within Tennessee Location within the United States
- Location: Blount / Knox / Loudon counties, Tennessee, US
- Coordinates: 35°47′31″N 84°14′36″W
- Type: reservoir
- Primary inflows: French Broad River, Holston River
- Primary outflows: Tennessee River
- Basin countries: United States
- Surface area: 13,769 acres (55.72 km^{2})
- Surface elevation: 813 feet (248 m)

Fort Loudoun Lake is a reservoir in east Tennessee on the upper Tennessee River, extending about 50 miles (80 km) on the water (along the river upstream) from Fort Loudoun Dam, at Lenoir City, to Knoxville.

Fort Loudoun Reservoir takes its name from mid-18th-century Fort Loudoun, a British fortress built on a nearby site during the French and Indian War. The fort was named for John Campbell, 4th Earl of Loudoun, commander of British forces in North America at the time.

Fort Loudoun is a popular recreation destination, known for bass fishing, boating, and birdwatching. The tailwater area immediately below the dam is an excellent site for viewing a variety of waterbirds, including herons, cormorants, gulls, osprey, and bald eagles.

The reservoir is connected by a short canal to Tellico Reservoir on the nearby Little Tennessee River. Water is diverted through the canal to Fort Loudoun for power production. The canal also offers commercial barges access to Tellico without the need for a lock. Barges passing through the Fort Loudoun lock carry about half a million tons of cargo a year.

== See also ==
- Dams and reservoirs of the Tennessee River
