= Knox County, Tennessee =

County in Tennessee, United States

- County
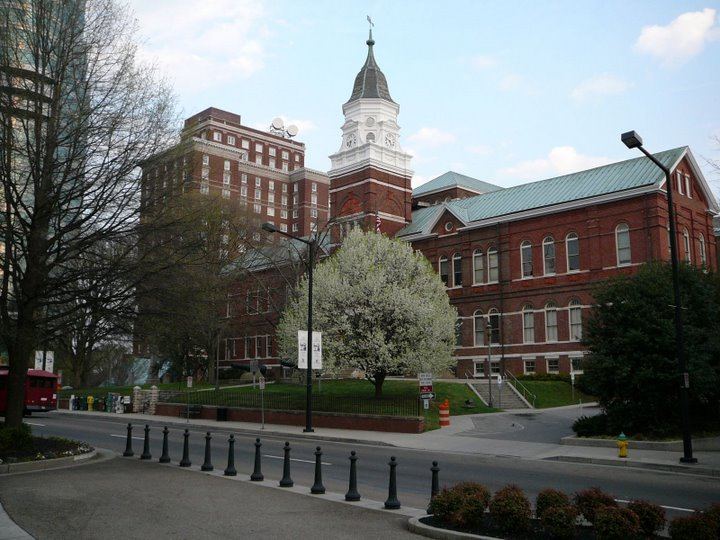
- Knox County Courthouse

- Flag Seal

- Location within the U.S. state of Tennessee
- Coordinates: 35°59′N 83°56′W
- Country: United States
- State: Tennessee
- Founded: June 15, 1792
- Named for: Henry Knox
- Seat: Knoxville
- Largest city: Knoxville

Government
  - Mayor: Betsy Henderson (R)

Area
  - Total: 526 sq mi (1,360 km^{2})
  - Land: 508 sq mi (1,320 km^{2})
  - Water: 18 sq mi (47 km^{2}) 3.5%

Population (2020)
  - Total: 478,971
  - Estimate (2025): 511,453 ▲
  - Density: 943/sq mi (364/km^{2})
- Congressional district: 2nd
- Website: knoxcounty.org

Knox County is a county located in the U.S. state of Tennessee. The population was 511,453 as of a 2025 estimate, making it the third-most populous county in Tennessee. Its county seat is Knoxville, which is the third-most populous city in Tennessee. Knox County is included in the Knoxville metropolitan area. The county is located at the geographical center of the Great Valley of East Tennessee. Near the heart of the county is the origin of the Tennessee River, at the confluence of the Holston and French Broad rivers.

== History ==
Knox County was created after the American Revolutionary War on June 11, 1792, by Governor William Blount from parts of Greene and Hawkins counties. It was one of the few counties created when this area was still known as the Southwest Territory. It is one of nine United States counties named for American Revolutionary War general Henry Knox, who was appointed as the first United States Secretary of War. As population increased, parts of Knox County were taken out to form Blount (1795), Anderson (1801), Roane (1801), and Union (1850) counties.

In 1783, James White and Francis Alexander Ramsey led an expedition to explore the Upper Tennessee Valley, now within the boundaries of Knox County. White moved to what is now the Riverdale community on the banks of the French Broad River in the eastern part of the county in 1785, and the following year constructed a fort a few miles to the west. A community developed around the fortified trading post, ultimately becoming the city of Knoxville. Governor Blount designated the fort as the capital of the Southwest Territory in 1790, and gave the new town the name "Knoxville" after his superior, Henry Knox.

Blount began construction of his house, Blount Mansion, in the early 1790s. This is one of a number of late eighteenth-century structures that have been preserved in the county. The house still stands in downtown Knoxville. The Alexander McMillan House, built in the mid-1780s by Alexander McMillan (1749–1837), still stands in eastern Knox County. The Alexander Bishop House, built by Stockley Donelson in 1793, and a log house built in the same year by Nicholas Gibbs both still stand in the northern part of the county. Campbell's Station, a fort and stagecoach stop located in what is now Farragut, was built by Captain David Campbell (1753–1832) in 1787. John Sevier established a plantation, known as Marble Springs, in the southern part of the county in the 1790s. He was active in leading raids against the Cherokee people, who for years resisted with force American settlement in their territory.

=== Civil War ===
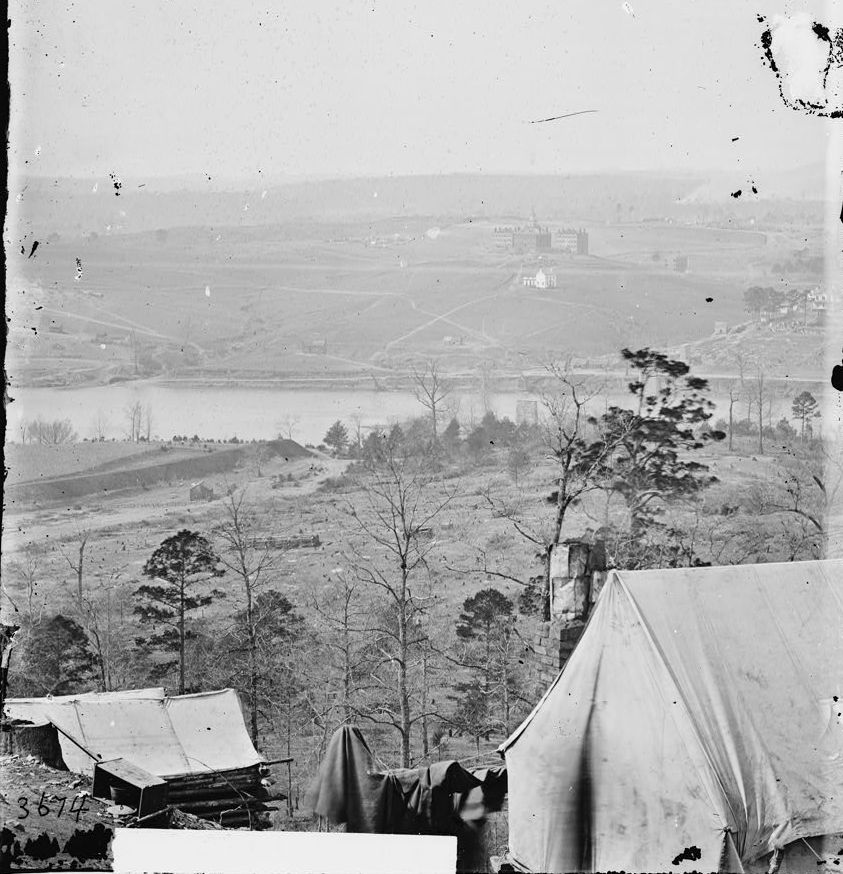
View from the south bank of the Tennessee River by Union photographer George C. Barnard after the end of the Siege of Knoxville, December 1863. Source: Library of Congress

Important railroad lines passed through Knox County, making it a strategic area both for Union and for Confederate forces throughout the Civil War. Since the mountainous terrain of East Tennessee was mostly unsuitable for plantation crops such as cotton, slavery was not as prevalent as it was in Middle and West Tennessee. The US 1860 census of Knox County showed a population of 20,020 white citizens and 2,370 enslaved African Americans. The lack of slavery combined with the vestiges of a once-strong abolitionist movement were two reasons most residents of Knox County, along with much of East Tennessee, were pro-Union. In February 1861, 89% of Knox Countians voted for the pro-Union ballot in a statewide referendum on secession. On June 8, 1861, the county voted against Tennessee's Ordinance of Secession by a margin of 3,108 to 1,226.

Prior to secession, Unionists from Knox County collaborated with other East Tennessee Unionists in an attempt to secede from Tennessee itself and remain part of the Union. Oliver Perry Temple, a Knoxville lawyer, was named to a three-man commission to appear before the General Assembly in Nashville and request East Tennessee and pro-Union Middle Tennessee counties be allowed to secede from the state. The attempt failed. After the second state referendum for secession passed in 1861, Knox County and the rest of Tennessee joined the Confederacy.

Knox County remained under Confederate control until September 3, 1863, when General Ambrose Burnside and the Union army marched into Knoxville unopposed. Parts of Middle Tennessee had been occupied by Union troops since 1862.

Union Colonel William Harris, son of New York Senator Ira Harris, wrote his father:

'Glory be to God, the Yankees have come! The flag's come back to Tennessee!' Such were the welcomes all along the road, as we entered Knoxville, it was past all description. The people seemed frantic with joy. I never knew what the Love of Liberty was before. The old flag has been hidden in mattresses and under carpets. It now floats to the breeze at every staff in East Tennessee. Ladies wear it – carry it – wave it! Little children clap their hands and kiss it.

With the success of Burnside's troops in the Knoxville Campaign, and especially during the decisive Battle of Fort Sanders, Knox County remained under Union control for the duration of the Civil War.

=== Tennessee marble ===
The XVI on the Knox County Seal is a nod to Tennessee becoming the 16th state. The late 19th and early 20th centuries, Knox County was an important venue for the quarrying and finishing of Tennessee marble, a type of limestone used in monument construction across the United States and Canada. Eleven quarries were operating in Knox County in 1882, and within ten years that number had doubled. Notable quarries in Knox included the Bond Quarry in Concord, an Evans Company quarry near Forks-of-the-River, and the Ross-Republic quarries near Island Home Park in South Knoxville. Finishing centers were located in Lonsdale and at the Candoro Marble Works in South Knoxville.

== Geography ==
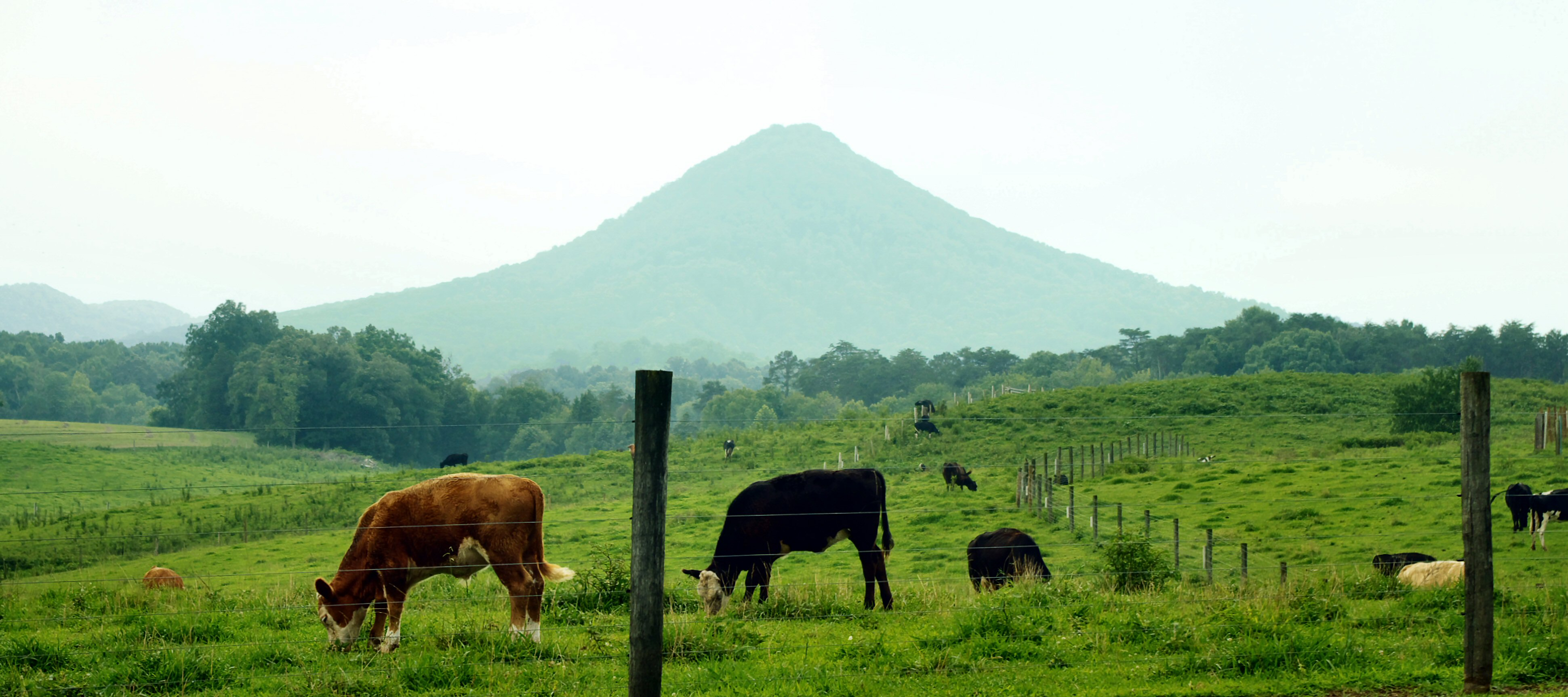
House Mountain, Knox County's high point, viewed from Emory Road, near the Knox–Grainger line

According to the U.S. Census Bureau, the county has a total area of 526 square miles (1,360 km^{2}), of which 508 square miles (1,320 km^{2}) is land and 18 square miles (47 km^{2}) (3.4%) is water. The county lies amidst the Ridge-and-Valley Appalachians, which are characterized by long, narrow ridges, oriented northeast-to-southwest, alternating with similarly shaped valleys. Notable ridges in the county include Bays Mountain, McAnnally Ridge, Beaver Ridge, Sharp's Ridge and Copper Ridge. House Mountain, at 2,064 feet (629 m), is the county's highest point, and is the focus of a state natural area.

The Holston and French Broad rivers join to form the Tennessee River in the eastern part of the county, an area known as "Forks-of-the-River." This section of the river is part of Fort Loudoun Lake, which is created by Fort Loudoun Dam on the river several miles downstream in Lenoir City.

=== Cherokee Caverns ===
Cherokee Caverns is 14 miles west of Knoxville and can be accessed by Highway 62. It was discovered in 1854 by Robert Crudgington, who noticed fog emerging between rocks on his farm. He dug the entrance open and explored the cave. His daughter Margaret Crudgington opened the cave to the public in 1929 under the name Gentrys Cave; the next year she changed the name to Grand Caverns.

The cave has been open to the public, sporadically, ever since, under a variety of names. It is currently called Cherokee Caverns, referring to the historic tribe who occupied this area at the time of European encounter.

Indian artifacts located in the cave indicate that another entrance to the cave existed at some time in the past.

=== Adjacent counties ===
- Union County (north)
- Grainger County (northeast)
- Jefferson County (east)
- Sevier County (southeast)
- Blount County (south)
- Loudon County (southwest)
- Roane County (west)
- Anderson County (northwest)

=== State protected areas ===
- Forks of the River Wildlife Management Area
- Fort Loudoun Wildlife Management Area
- House Mountain State Natural Area
- Marble Springs (state historic site)
- Seven Islands State Birding Park

== Demographics ==
Historical population
Census	Pop.	Note	%±
1800	12,446		—
1810	10,171		−18.3%
1820	13,034		28.1%
1830	14,498		11.2%
1840	15,485		6.8%
1850	18,807		21.5%
1860	22,813		21.3%
1870	28,990		27.1%
1880	39,124		35.0%
1890	59,557		52.2%
1900	74,302		24.8%
1910	94,187		26.8%
1920	112,926		19.9%
1930	155,902		38.1%
1940	178,468		14.5%
1950	223,007		25.0%
1960	250,523		12.3%
1970	276,293		10.3%
1980	319,694		15.7%
1990	335,749		5.0%
2000	382,032		13.8%
2010	432,226		13.1%
2020	478,971		10.8%
2025 (est.)	511,453	▲	6.8%
U.S. Decennial Census; 1790–1960 1900–1990; 1990–2000 2010–2014

=== Racial and ethnic composition ===
Knox County, Tennessee – Racial and ethnic composition Note: the US Census treats Hispanic/Latino as an ethnic category. This table excludes Latinos from the racial categories and assigns them to a separate category. Hispanics/Latinos may be of any race.
Race / Ethnicity (NH = Non-Hispanic)	Pop 1980	Pop 1990	Pop 2000	Pop 2010	Pop 2020	% 1980	% 1990	% 2000	% 2010	% 2020
White alone (NH)	287,128	300,040	333,993	362,580	373,790	89.81%	89.36%	87.43%	83.89%	78.04%
Black or African American alone (NH)	27,868	29,483	32,788	37,648	39,853	8.72%	8.78%	8.58%	8.71%	8.32%
Native American or Alaska Native alone (NH)	437	775	946	1,018	1,079	0.14%	0.23%	0.25%	0.24%	0.23%
Asian alone (NH)	1,580	3,263	4,909	7,998	11,881	0.49%	0.97%	1.28%	1.85%	2.48%
Native Hawaiian or Pacific Islander alone (NH)	x	x	94	277	300	x	x	0.02%	0.06%	0.06%
Other race alone (NH)	708	121	428	561	1,776	0.22%	0.04%	0.11%	0.13%	0.37%
Mixed race or Multiracial (NH)	x	x	4,071	7,132	21,724	x	x	1.07%	1.65%	4.54%
Hispanic or Latino (any race)	1,973	2,067	4,803	15,012	28,568	0.62%	0.62%	1.26%	3.47%	5.96%
Total	319,694	335,749	382,032	432,226	478,971	100.00%	100.00%	100.00%	100.00%	100.00%

=== 2020 census ===
As of the 2020 census, there were 478,971 people and 118,160 families residing in the county.

There were 195,165 households in the county, of which 27.9% had children under the age of 18 living in them, 45.9% were married-couple households, 18.9% were households with a male householder and no spouse or partner present, and 28.7% were households with a female householder and no spouse or partner present. About 29.9% of all households were made up of individuals and 10.9% had someone living alone who was 65 years of age or older.

The median age was 37.9 years. 21.0% of residents were under the age of 18 and 16.6% of residents were 65 years of age or older. For every 100 females there were 94.1 males, and for every 100 females age 18 and over there were 91.6 males age 18 and over.

The racial makeup of the county was 79.2% White, 8.4% Black or African American, 0.4% American Indian and Alaska Native, 2.5% Asian, 0.1% Native Hawaiian and Pacific Islander, 2.8% from some other race, and 6.5% from two or more races. Hispanic or Latino residents of any race comprised 6.0% of the population.

90.8% of residents lived in urban areas, while 9.2% lived in rural areas.

There were 210,972 housing units, of which 7.5% were vacant. Among occupied housing units, 64.4% were owner-occupied and 35.6% were renter-occupied. The homeowner vacancy rate was 1.5% and the rental vacancy rate was 8.0%.

=== 2010 census ===
As of the census of 2010, there were 432,226 people, 177,249 households, and 110,757 families residing in the county. The population density was 821.72 persons per square mile (317.27 persons/km^{2}). The average housing unit density was 348.92 units per square mile (134.72/km^{2}). The racial makeup of the county was 86.78% White, 8.8% Black or African American, 0.29% Native American, 1.87% Asian, 0.08% Pacific Islander, and 1.91% multiracial. Hispanics and/or Latinos (of any race) were 3.47% of the population.

Out of all the households, 29.68% had children under the age of 18 living in them, 47.04% were family households, 3.95% had a male householder with no wife present, 11.49% had a female householder with no husband present, and 37.51% were non families. 29.65% of all households were made up of individuals living alone, and 9.14% had someone living alone who was 65 years of age or older. The average household size was 2.37 and the average family size was 2.95.

21.86% of the population was under the age of 18, 65.07% from ages 18 to 64, and 13.05% aged 65 and older. The median age was 37.2 years. 51.39% of the population was female, and 48.61% was male.

The median household income was estimated to be $52,458, and the per capita income was estimated to be $30,541. Approximately 13.5% of the population was below the poverty line.

=== 2000 census ===
As of the census of 2000, there were 382,032 people, 157,872 households, and 100,722 families residing in the county. The population density was 751 people per square mile (290 people/km^{2}). There were 171,439 housing units at an average density of 337 units per square mile (130/km^{2}). The racial makeup of the county was 88.10% White, 8.63% Black or African American, 0.26% Native American, 1.29% Asian, 0.03% Pacific Islander, 0.50% from other races, and 1.18% from two or more races. 1.26% of the population were Hispanic or Latino of any race.

There were 157,872 households, out of which 28.50% had children under the age of 18 living with them, 49.80% were married couples living together, 10.90% had a female householder with no husband present, and 36.20% were non-families. 29.60% of all households were made up of individuals, and 9.10% had someone living alone who was 65 years of age or older. The average household size was 2.34 and the average family size was 2.92.

In the county, the population was spread out, with 22.30% under the age of 18, 11.60% from 18 to 24, 30.40% from 25 to 44, 23.10% from 45 to 64, and 12.70% who were 65 years of age or older. The median age was 36 years. For every 100 females, there were 93.50 males. For every 100 females age 18 and over, there were 90.10 males.

The median income for a household in the county was $37,454, and the median income for a family was $49,182. Males had a median income of $35,755 versus $25,140 for females. The per capita income for the county was $21,875. About 8.40% of families and 12.60% of the population were below the poverty line, including 14.50% of those under age 18 and 9.70% of those age 65 or over.

== Government and politics ==
=== County government ===
The county mayor is the head of the executive branch of Knox County Government. The current county mayor is former Knox County School Board member, Betsy Henderson, a Republican. According to the county charter, the mayor serves as the chief financial officer of the county, responsible for developing the county’s annual budget, approving contracts, and overseeing county operations. Other duties include maintaining county roads, highways, and bridges, enforcing codes, operating the county health department and public library system, and supervising various executive branch departments.

The mayor has the authority to veto resolutions and ordinances passed by the Knox County Commission. A majority-plus-one vote of the commission is required to override a mayoral veto unless the vetoed legislation originally required a two-thirds vote, in which case a two-thirds vote is required to override.

Knox County administers the local school and library systems, while Knoxville maintains an independent police department separate from the county sheriff. The property assessor’s office, tax offices, and the Metropolitan Planning Commission are combined between city and county governments. All county elections are conducted on a partisan basis. County commissioners’ districts do not correspond with the city of Knoxville, which has its own mayor and city council. Residents living within Knoxville city limits vote in both city and county elections, are represented by both mayors, and pay city and county taxes. While some administrative functions may appear duplicated, services are generally separated. The local school district gained attention for banning books such as Roots: The Saga of an American Family.

==== Countywide elected officials ====
Office	Name
District Attorney	Charme P. Allen (R)
County Mayor	Betsy Henderson (R)
Sheriff	Brent Gibson (R)
Trustee	Nick McBride (R)
Assessor of Property	Phil Ballard (R)
County Clerk	Richie Beeler (R)
Register of Deeds	Sherry Witt (R)
Circuit Court Clerk	Charles D. Susano III (R)

==== State elected offices ====
Knox County is represented in the Tennessee General Assembly by mainly Republicans. In the Tennessee Senate, the county is entirely represented by 3 Republican senators. In the Tennessee House of Representatives, 7 districts include portions of Knox County, with 5 Republicans and 2 Democrats serving as state representatives.

Office	Name
State Senator, District 5	Randy McNally (R)
State Senator, District 6	Becky Duncan Massey (R)
State Senator, District 7	Richard Briggs (R)

Office	Name
State Representative, District 14	Jason Zachary (R)
State Representative, District 15	Sam McKenzie (D)
State Representative, District 16	Michele Carringer (R)
State Representative, District 18	Elaine Davis (R)
State Representative, District 19	Dave Wright (R)
State Representative, District 89	Justin Lafferty (R)
State Representative, District 90	Gloria Johnson (D)

==== Legislative branch ====
Knox County Board of Commissioners by partisanship
All 9 districts 6 (Note: This includes the 2 county-wide elected members.) seats needed for a majority
	Majority party	Minority party
Party	Republican	Democratic
Seats	8	3
- As of 2026; Republican Democratic

The Knox County Board of Commissioners is the legislative body of Knox County and consists of 11 members: 9 elected at the district level and 2 elected countywide to serve at-large. Commissioners meet multiple times each month, with their primary business meetings being a monthly work session and a monthly voting meeting. During the work session, commissioners generally debate items on the monthly agenda and take a non-binding vote on each item in advance of the more formal voting meeting, which is generally held the following week.

The Board of Commissioners approves resolutions, ordinances, honorariums, road names, as well as most county contracts and large expenditures. Resolutions require a single vote for passage, while ordinances require two votes, or "two readings". The County Commission also serves as the appropriating body of the county and must approve an annual budget – presented by the mayor – which includes funding for the various county departments, including the Knox County Schools. The body also sets the property tax rate for the county.

The board currently has a Republican majority, with 7 Republicans and 4 Democrats as of the 2026 elections.

District	Name	Party	First elected	Neighborhoods
1	Damon Rawls	Democratic	2024	Downtown Knoxville, East Knoxville, Fort Sanders, Holston Hills, Lonsdale
2	Courtney Durrett	Democratic	2020	Alice Bell, Fountain City, North Knoxville, Oakwood-Lincoln Park, Old North Knoxville
3	Brandon Huckaby	Democratic	2026	Amherst, Cedar Bluff, Deep Creek
4	Shane Jackson	Democratic	2024	Bearden, Rocky Hill, Sequoyah Hills, West Hills, West Knoxville
5	Angela Russell	Republican	2024	Concord, Farragut, Shady Grove, Turkey Creek
6	Terry Hill	Republican	2020	Hardin Valley, Karns, Ridgedale
7	Barry Beeler	Republican	2022	Halls Crossroads, Heiskell, Powell
8	Adam Thompson	Republican	2024	Carter, Corryton, Harbison Crossroads, Mascot, Strawberry Plains
9	Andy Fox	Republican	2024	Colonial Village, Island Home Park, Kimberlin Heights, Lake Forest, New Hopewell, South Knoxville
10	Larsen Jay	Republican	2018	at-large
11	Kim Frazier	Republican	2022	at-large

==== Education governance ====
Knox County Board of Education by partisanship
All 9 districts 5 seats needed for a majority
	Majority party	Minority party
Party	Democratic	Republican
Seats	5	4
- As of 2026; Republican Democratic

Public education in Knox County is overseen by the Knox County Board of Education, which governs the Knox County Schools. The board consists of nine members elected from single-member districts, serving four-year terms. These districts use the same boundary lines as the Knox County Commission, representing residents of Knoxville, the Town of Farragut, and all other areas of Knox County.

Members represent residents of Knoxville, the Town of Farragut, and other areas of Knox County.

The board acts as a single governing body, making decisions that apply to the entire school system. Its responsibilities include setting policies for Knox County Schools, approving the annual school system budget, appointing and supervising the Superintendent of Schools, and selecting a chair and vice chair from among its members each year.

The board currently has a Republican majority, with 5 Republicans and 4 Democrats as of the 2024 elections.

District	Name	Party	First elected	Neighborhoods
1	Rev. John Butler	Democratic	2022	Downtown Knoxville, East Knoxville, Fort Sanders, Holston Hills, Lonsdale
2	Anne Templeton	Democratic	2024	Alice Bell, Fountain City, North Knoxville, Oakwood-Lincoln Park, Old North Knoxville
3	Patricia Fontenot‑Ridley	Democratic	2024	Amherst, Cedar Bluff, Deep Creek
4	Katherine Bike	Democratic	2022	Bearden, Rocky Hill, Sequoyah Hills, West Hills, West Knoxville
5	Lauren Morgan	Republican	2024	Concord, Farragut, Shady Grove, Turkey Creek
6	Betsy Henderson	Republican	2020	Hardin Valley, Karns, Ridgedale
7	Steve Triplett	Republican	2022	Halls Crossroads, Heiskell, Powell
8	Travis Wright	Republican	2024	Carter, Corryton, Harbison Crossroads, Mascot, Strawberry Plains
9	Brandy Jenkins	Democratic	2026	Colonial Village, Island Home Park, Kimberlin Heights, Lake Forest, New Hopewell, South Knoxville

=== Political history ===
Like most counties in heavily-Unionist East Tennessee, Knox County has historically been strongly Republican. Although it is conservative for an urban county, it is notably less Republican than most of the rest of East Tennessee. This is largely due to the influence of Knoxville, which in recent years has had a tendency to vote Democratic in statewide races, has elected Democratic mayors, and regularly elects Democrats to the state legislature. However, the suburban and rural areas are among the most Republican areas of Tennessee and the South.

Presidentially, Franklin Roosevelt carried the county in three of his four presidential elections, while several nearby counties are among the only counties in the nation to have never supported a Democratic candidate for president in their entire existence. Nevertheless, Democratic candidates have crossed the 40-percent mark only seven times since Roosevelt's death. In 1964, it was nearly swept up in Lyndon Johnson's national landslide; Johnson lost the county by only 334 votes. Jimmy Carter in 1976 and Bill Clinton in 1992 and 1996 are the only Democrats since then to come reasonably close to carrying the county, losing it by single-digit margins; in Clinton's case with Tennessean Al Gore on the ticket. Gore lost the county by 17 points in 2000 during his own bid for president, but still managed 40 percent. The Democrats would not cross the 40 percent threshold again until 2020, when Joe Biden received over 41 percent of the county's vote.

United States presidential election results for Knox County, Tennessee
Year	Republican		Democratic		Third party(ies)	
Year	No.	%	No.	%	No.	%
1880	4,361	58.18%	3,119	41.61%	16	0.21%
1884	5,248	59.11%	3,481	39.21%	149	1.68%
1888	6,123	59.12%	3,929	37.94%	305	2.94%
1892	4,182	49.11%	3,987	46.82%	347	4.07%
1896	6,243	59.83%	4,020	38.52%	172	1.65%
1900	3,982	46.35%	4,389	51.08%	221	2.57%
1904	4,309	55.61%	3,196	41.25%	243	3.14%
1908	5,817	56.56%	4,090	39.77%	378	3.68%
1912	1,984	19.86%	4,069	40.73%	3,938	39.42%
1916	5,791	57.27%	4,214	41.68%	106	1.05%
1920	12,005	63.41%	6,801	35.93%	125	0.66%
1924	10,709	56.41%	6,935	36.53%	1,340	7.06%
1928	14,627	71.55%	5,767	28.21%	49	0.24%
1932	9,774	46.71%	10,755	51.39%	398	1.90%
1936	12,183	37.93%	19,837	61.76%	100	0.31%
1940	13,877	40.45%	20,226	58.96%	201	0.59%
1944	20,742	52.58%	18,482	46.85%	228	0.58%
1948	21,074	53.77%	15,946	40.68%	2,176	5.55%
1952	44,358	62.32%	26,681	37.48%	139	0.20%
1956	46,167	60.09%	29,768	38.74%	896	1.17%
1960	50,811	61.00%	31,990	38.40%	499	0.60%
1964	42,797	50.20%	42,463	49.80%	0	0.00%
1968	47,202	52.44%	24,528	27.25%	18,277	20.31%
1972	64,747	71.56%	24,076	26.61%	1,661	1.84%
1976	56,013	50.73%	53,034	48.03%	1,362	1.23%
1980	66,153	56.26%	45,634	38.81%	5,798	4.93%
1984	76,965	63.61%	43,448	35.91%	574	0.47%
1988	73,092	63.27%	41,829	36.21%	600	0.52%
1992	66,607	46.75%	59,702	41.90%	16,167	11.35%
1996	70,761	50.53%	61,158	43.67%	8,126	5.80%
2000	86,851	57.68%	60,969	40.49%	2,766	1.84%
2004	110,803	62.10%	66,013	37.00%	1,603	0.90%
2008	113,015	60.73%	70,215	37.73%	2,856	1.53%
2012	109,707	63.60%	59,399	34.43%	3,401	1.97%
2016	105,767	58.53%	62,878	34.80%	12,052	6.67%
2020	124,540	56.47%	91,422	41.45%	4,594	2.08%
2024	130,815	58.96%	87,516	39.45%	3,533	1.59%

=== County mayoral elections ===
- 2018 Knox County, Tennessee mayoral election
- 2022 Knox County, Tennessee mayoral election
- 2026 Knox County, Tennessee mayoral election

== Transportation ==
=== Mass transportation ===
Knoxville Area Transit provides city bus service, while McGhee Tyson Airport features a variety of regional flights to Midwestern and Southern cities.

=== Major highways ===
- I-40
- I-75
- I-140
- I-275
- I-640
- US 11
- US 11E
- US 11W
- US 25W
- US 70 (Kingston Pike)
- US 129
- US 441
- SR 1
- SR 7
- SR 9
- SR 33
- SR 34
- SR 61
- SR 62
- SR 71
- SR 115
- SR 131
- SR 158
- SR 162
- SR 168
- SR 169
- SR 170
- SR 331
- SR 332

== Communities ==
=== City ===
- Knoxville (county seat)

=== Town ===
- Farragut

=== Census-designated places ===
- John Sevier
- Karns
- Mascot
- Powell

=== Unincorporated communities ===
- Beech Grove
- Bonny Kate
- Carter
- Concord
- Corinth
- Corryton
- Grandview
- Harbison Crossroads
- Hardin Valley
- Halls Crossroads
- Heiskell
- Kimberlin Heights
- King Arthur Court
- Midway
- Millertown
- New Hopewell
- Riverdale
- Shady Grove
- Strawberry Plains (partial)
- Solway
- Thorn Grove
- Zacharytown

== Education ==
Knox County School District operates public schools in the county.

Tennessee School for the Deaf is a state operated school in the county.

== Notable people ==
- Joseph Alexander Mabry (1796–1837), Tennessee state politician

== See also ==
- National Register of Historic Places listings in Knox County, Tennessee
- Knox County Schools
