= Tennessee House of Representatives 19th district =

State legislative district in Tennessee

Tennessee's 19th State House of Representatives district
- Map of Tennessee House districts with the 19th District shaded in red
Representative
Dave Wright; R–Corryton
since 2019
- Demographics: 87.6% White; 3.8% Black; 3.4% Hispanic; 1.6% Asian; 2.7% Multiracial
- Population (2024): 69,183

The Tennessee House of Representatives 19th district is one of the 99 legislative districts in the lower house of the Tennessee General Assembly. The district is located in East Tennessee and covers eastern Knox County. It includes outlying suburbs of Knoxville and surrounding rural areas. It includes the unincorporated communities of Mascot, Corryton, New Hopewell, and Midway. It also covers Gibbs, Ritta, Kimberlin Heights, and Tuckahoe. Dave Wright has represented the district since 2019.

== Demographics ==
The Tennessee Comptroller estimates the population as of 2024 at 69,183.

- 87.6% of the district is White
- 3.8% of the district is Black
- 3.4% of the district is Hispanic
- 1.6% of the district is Asian
- 2.7% of the district is Two or more races

Detailed demographic information is also available through Census Reporter.

== History ==
Prior to numbered districts, the area that would become the 19th district was the 8th district of Knox County. The 88th Tennessee General Assembly was the first in which all districts were numbered. The 19th district has been in Knox County since its creation.

== List of Representatives ==
Representative	Party	Years of Service	General Assembly	Hometown
Dave Wright	Republican	2019 - present	111th-114th	Corryton
Harry Brooks	Republican	2003-2018	103rd-110th	Knoxville
Jim Boyer	Republican	1993-2002	98th-102nd	Corryton
Jimmy Davis	Republican	1985-1992	94th-97th	Strawberry Plains
Loy L. Smith	Republican	1971-1984	87th-93rd	Strawberry Plains
