= Riverdale, Tennessee =

- Unincorporated community
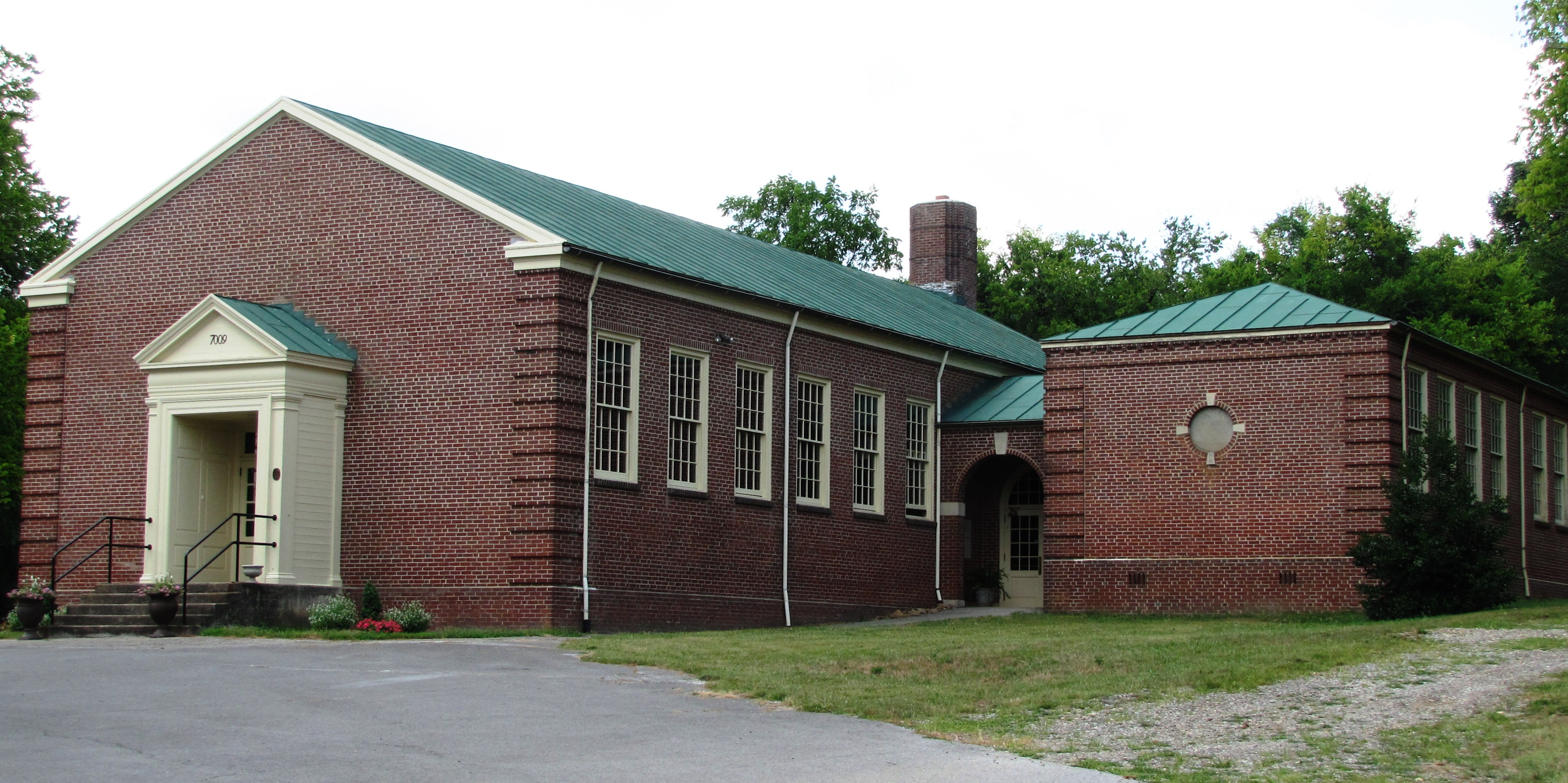
- The historic Riverdale School, circa 2010

- Location within Tennessee Location within the United States
- Coordinates: 35.9642524°N 83.7635107°W
- Country: United States
- State: Tennessee
- County: Knox
- Settled: 1785
- Established: 1874
- Founded by: James White
- Named after: Being situated in a dale (valley) adjacent to the French Broad River

Government
  - Type: County commission
  - Mayor: Glenn Jacobs (R)
  - Commissioners: Adam Thompson (R) (District 8); Andy Fox (R) (District 9); Kim Frazier (R) (At-Large); Larsen Jay (R) (At-Large)
- Elevation: 863 ft (263 m)
- Time zone: UTC-5 (Eastern (EST))
  - Summer (DST): UTC-4 (EDT)
- Postal code: 37914
- Area code: 865
- GNIS feature ID: 1299507

Riverdale is an unincorporated community in southeastern Knox County, Tennessee, United States. Riverdale is 8.7 miles (14.0 km) southeast of Knoxville. It is one of the earliest settlements in Knox County, and the Riverdale Historic District is listed on the National Register of Historic Places. Riverdale was named because it is located in a dale (valley) on the shore of the French Broad River.

== History ==
The Riverdale area was first reportedly settled by James White of the Province of North Carolina in 1785, after serving as a captain in the American Revolutionary War. White had obtained a land grant for over 1,000 acres of land and relocated west of Riverdale to erect a fort and cabin known as James White's Fort. White's Fort later became what is now the city of Knoxville, making White the city's founder.

Further settlement in the Riverdale community continued into the 1780s and 1790s. William A. Campbell, who arrived on the north bank of the French Broad River from Virginia, constructed a house in the community in 1790, before later establishing Campbell's Station (now known as Farragut) with his brother David in western Knox County. Alexander would return to his residence in Riverdale to establish a large farm while his brother continued to reside in Campbell's Station. Several settlers gained the namesake of several hollows in the valley and bends along the French Broad.

By 1874, the Riverdale community was officially established when the United States Postal Service designated a post office in the community, and later flourished into a village of 100 residents with a tannery, academy, harness shop, and two churches.

In the 1930s, residents of Riverdale had appeared before the Knox County Board of Education in a meeting a requesting that a new elementary school building be constructed to serve the children of the community. This request was approved using Public Works Administration funding for educational facilities. In 1938, a new school building, designed by Knoxville-based architectural firm Barber & McMurry was completed. By the 1950s, Riverdale School became first school in Knox County with all of its faculty having college degrees. Due to decreasing enrollment, Riverdale School was closed by the Knox County Schools district in 1986, with the building then serving as a community center, and Riverdale area students were relocated to Sunnyview Elementary near the Carter community. By the 2010s, the school structure was restored to its school-operation era as a private residence and the headquarters of the French Broad Preservation Association (FRPA) advocacy group, who use the facility for community events.

== Geography ==
Riverdale is located adjacent to the French Broad River in southeastern Knox County and is 8.7 miles (14.0 km) southeast of downtown Knoxville.

The Knoxville-Knox County Metropolitan Planning Commission defines the Riverdale area to include large portions of the north and south banks of the French Broad River around the intersection of Kodak Road and Thorn Grove Pike, which connect the community to Kodak in Sevier County and Thorn Grove and Interstate 40 in central-eastern Knox County respectively. Frazier Bend is the largest geographic feature in the area.

== Economy ==
The Riverdale area has largely remained as farmland providing different purposes, but predominately for livestock grazing and for hay and crop production. Many farms in the area are in conservation easements to restrict its use from land development.
