= Oakwood-Lincoln Park =

- Neighborhood
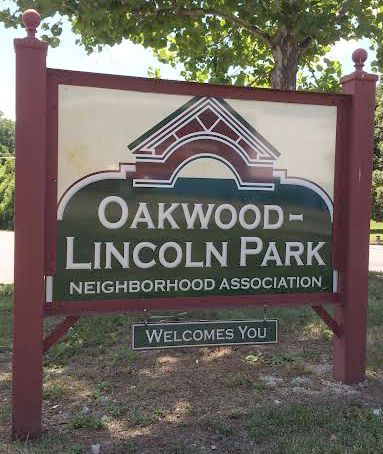
- Neighborhood association sign at the corner of Heiskell Avenue and N. Central Street

- Location in the State of Tennessee

- Location in the United States
- Coordinates: 35°59′51.29″N 083°55′50.66″W
- Country: United States
- State: Tennessee
- County: Knox
- City: Knoxville
- Time zone: UTC−05:00 (EST)
  - Summer (DST): UTC−04:00 (EDT)
- Area code: 865
- Zip code: 37917

Oakwood-Lincoln Park is a residential and commercial neighborhood in Knoxville, Tennessee, United States that was developed in the early 20th century as two suburban neighborhoods.

== Location ==
Oakwood-Lincoln Park is bounded by North Broadway (US-441) on the East and the Old North Knoxville neighborhood and the former Southern Railway Coster Shop Yards to the South. It is bounded by Interstate 275 and Sharp's Ridge on the West. On the North it is bounded by the neighborhood of Arlington prior to the confluence of Sharp's Ridge and North Broadway. The Lonsdale neighborhood lies across I-275 to the West. First Creek flows through the eastern portion of the neighborhood near North Broadway.

== Historic Buildings ==
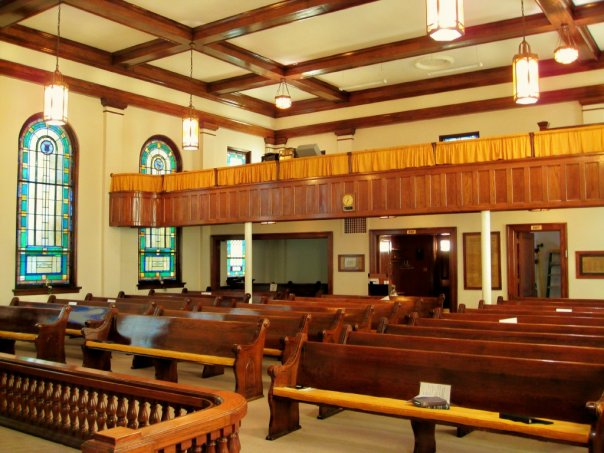
Sanctuary of the Lincoln Park United Methodist Church

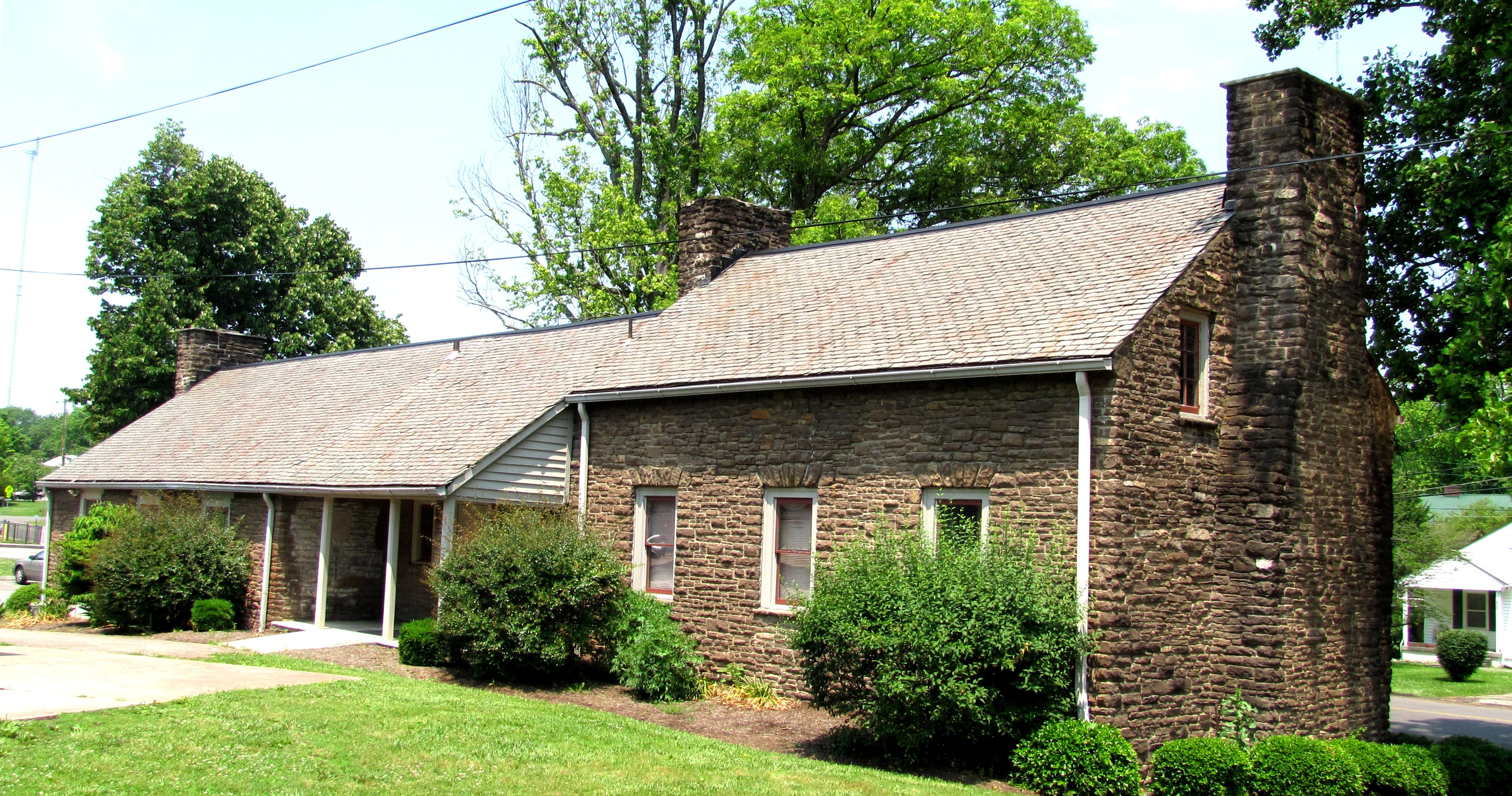
Christenberry Club Room

The neighborhood is home to two structures listed on the National Register of Historic Places. The Lincoln Park United Methodist Church is located at 3120 Pershing Street. The Christenerry Club Room is located at the corner of Henegar and Shamrock Avenues.

== History ==
Oakwood got its beginning when C.B. Atkin bought farm and forest land approximately three miles north of the city center for industrial and suburban residential development. Nearby were the yards of Southern Railway, Knoxville's largest employer at the time, and Atkin's development was aimed largely at targeting the some 1,600 employees. He located his C.B. Atkin furniture manufacturing firm on the new property, and in 1902 began subdividing lots for residential home construction.

One of the new streets, Burwell Avenue, was named after the developer's wife, whose maiden name was Mary Burwell. An Oakwood development pamphlet in 1905 advertised the center of Oakwood, by electric streetcar, was 12 minutes from Southern Station and 16 minutes from Market House, location of the current Market Square.

Lincoln Park was developed during approximately the same time frame. The City of Knoxville annexed both in 1917.

== See also ==
- National Register of Historic Places listings in Knox County, Tennessee
