= New Hopewell =

New Hopewell may refer to:

- Hopewell, Cleburne County, Alabama
- New Hopewell, Tennessee
- New Hopewell, a landmark farm in Jefferson County, West Virginia
