= Lake Forest, Knoxville =

Neighborhood in Knoxville, Tennessee

Coordinates: 35.927°N 83.868°W

Lake Forest is a neighborhood in Knoxville, Tennessee located in the South Knoxville area. The area covers south of Knoxville Downtown Island Home Airport, then along Island Home Avenue, Chapman Highway, West Red Bud Drive (later Sarvis Drive), Stone Road, Oliver Road, Neubert Springs Road, Martin Mill Pike to Ogle Avenue, Doyle Street, Maryville Pike, back to Chapman Highway, then Moody Avenue to Seveirville Pike, East Red Bud Road, and Gilbert Lane.

The neighborhood is part of the Dogwood Trail as part of the Dogwood Arts Festival.

Its ZIP code in 37920.

South-Doyle High School is the main high school in this neighborhood.
