= John Sevier, Tennessee =

John Sevier
- CDP
- Location within Tennessee Location within the United States
- Coordinates: 36.040199°N 83.815559°W
- Country: United States
- State: Tennessee
- County: Knox

Area
  - Total: 0.76 sq mi (1.97 km^{2})
  - Land: 0.76 sq mi (1.97 km^{2})
  - Water: 0 sq mi (0.00 km^{2})
- Elevation: 1,138 ft (347 m)

Population (2020)
  - Total: 1,026
  - Density: 1,348.8/sq mi (520.79/km^{2})
- Time zone: UTC-5 (Eastern (EST))
  - Summer (DST): UTC-4 (EDT)
- ZIP code: 37924
- Area code: 865
- GNIS feature ID: 2804638

John Sevier is a census-designated place in central-eastern Knox County, Tennessee. It is 9.3 miles (15.0 km) northeast of downtown Knoxville. The John Sevier Yard, a multi-track rail yard operated by Norfolk Southern Railway, is located just south of the community in the Knoxville city limits.

The population of the CDP was 1,026 at the 2020 census.

== Demographics ==
Historical population
Census	Pop.	Note	%±
2020	1,026		—
U.S. Decennial Census
