= Rocky Hill, Knoxville =

Rocky Hill
- Neighborhood of Knoxville
- Location in Tennessee and the United States Rocky Hill (the United States)
- Coordinates: 35.903°N 84.021°W
- Country: United States
- State: Tennessee
- County: Knox
- City: Knoxville
- Elevation: 1,004 ft (306 m)
- Time zone: UTC-5 (Eastern (EST))
  - Summer (DST): UTC-4 (EDT)
- ZIP code: 37919
- Area code: 865
- GNIS feature ID: 1299894

Rocky Hill is a West Knoxville neighborhood in Knoxville, Tennessee. It encompasses an area north and west of Tennessee State Route 332 (Northshore Drive), east of Wallace Road, and south of Westland Drive.

Its ZIP code is 37919.
