= Millertown, Tennessee =

- Unincorporated community
- Millertown
- Location within Tennessee Location within the United States
- Coordinates: 36.0409167°N 83.8435160°W
- Country: United States
- State: Tennessee
- County: Knox

Government
  - Type: County commission
  - Mayor: Glenn Jacobs (R)
  - Commissioners: Courtney Durrett (D) (District 2); Adam Thompson (R) (District 8); Kim Frazier (R) (At-Large); Larsen Jay (R) (At-Large)
- Elevation: 935 ft (285 m)
- Time zone: UTC-5 (Eastern (EST))
  - Summer (DST): UTC-4 (EDT)
- Area code: 865
- GNIS feature ID: 1293978

Millertown is an unincorporated community in central-eastern Knox County, Tennessee, United States. Millertown is 7.9 miles (12.7 km) northeast of Knoxville.
