= Colonial Village, Knoxville =

Neighborhood in Knoxville, Tennessee

Coordinates: 35.920°N 83.883°W

Colonial Village is a neighborhood in Knoxville, Tennessee. Located in the South Knoxville area, it was registered in the city deed books in 1940. The village was developed after World War II and into the 1950s.

The area covered in Colonial Village is surrounded by Chapman Highway, Martin Mill Pike, Stone Road, Magazine Road, and West Ford Valley Road.

The ZIP code for this neighborhood is 37920.

Its main high school in the area is South-Doyle High School.
