= Carter, Tennessee =

- Unincorporated community
- Carter
- Location within Tennessee Location within the United States
- Coordinates: 36.0209193°N 83.7140660°W
- Country: United States
- State: Tennessee
- County: Knox

Government
  - Type: County commission
  - Mayor: Glenn Jacobs (R)
  - Commissioners: Adam Thompson (R) (District 8); Kim Frazier (R) (At-Large); Larsen Jay (R) (At-Large)
- Elevation: 906 ft (276 m)
- Time zone: UTC-5 (Eastern (EST))
  - Summer (DST): UTC-4 (EDT)
- ZIP codes: 37871, 37924
- Area code: 865
- GNIS feature ID: 1314795

Carter is an unincorporated community in eastern Knox County, Tennessee. It is included in the Knoxville Metropolitan Statistical Area.

== History ==
Carter has been known throughout history as a 'tight-knit' rural community known for its residents' anti-development approach, and preservation of agricultural culture. Since the proposal of the Midway Business Park in nearby Thorn Grove, efforts to ease the controversy of development in the Carter area have increased through public forums.

== Geography ==
Carter is located 14 miles east of the city of Knoxville. It is also located partially inside Knoxville's city limits and urban growth boundary. It is represented by Knoxville ZIP code 37924, and Strawberry Plains ZIP code 37871.

== Economy ==
Carter has a Food City supermarket, a pharmacy and several dollar stores.

Plans for a mixed-use town centre in Carter have been proposed since 2001 by the Knoxville-Knox County Metropolitan Planning Commission to provide a community hub space for eastern Knox County as the Carter area's population grows.

== Education ==
=== Public schools ===
Students in the Carter area attend the following schools in the Knox County Schools district:

- Carter Elementary School
- Carter Middle School
- Carter High School
- Career Magnet Academy

== Infrastructure ==
The Knoxville Utilities Board (KUB) provides water, sewer, gas, and electricity to the Carter area. However, sewer service by the KUB is limited to the denser and more developed portions of the community, with those outside of these areas having to use individual septic tank and drain field systems.

=== Transportation ===
All U.S. routes, state routes in Carter, along with I-40, are maintained by the Tennessee Department of Transportation (TDOT) in TDOT Region 1, which consists of 24 counties in East Tennessee. Streets, sidewalks, and greenways in the Carter area are maintained by the Knox County Engineering & Public Works Department, or the City of Knoxville Engineering Department for portions inside the Knoxville city limits.

==== Principal highways ====
- I-40
- US 11E (Andrew Johnson Highway, Asheville Highway)
- US 25W
- US 70
- SR 9 (concurrent to US 70-US 25W)
- SR 34 (concurrent to US 11E)

==== Major surface routes ====
- Brakebill Road
- Carter School Road
- Ruggles Ferry Pike
- Pleasant Hill Road
- Strawberry Plains Pike
