= Hardin Valley, Tennessee =

Unincorporated community in Knox County, Tennessee, United States

- Unincorporated community
- Hardin Valley
- Location in Tennessee and the United States Hardin Valley (the United States)
- Coordinates: 35.920414°N 84.216537°W
- Country: United States
- State: Tennessee
- County: Knox

Government
  - Type: County commission
  - Mayor: Glenn Jacobs (R)
  - Commissioners: Terry Hill (R) (District 6); Kim Frazier (R) (At-Large); Larsen Jay (R) (At-Large)
- Elevation: 837 ft (255 m)

Population (2010)
  - Total: 10,450
  - Estimate (2018): 37,030
- Time zone: UTC-5 (Eastern (EST))
  - Summer (DST): UTC-4 (EDT)
- ZIP code: 37932
- Area code: 865
- GNIS feature ID: 1286838

Hardin Valley is a suburban unincorporated community in west Knox County, Tennessee, United States. It is about 15.5 miles (24.9 km) west of downtown Knoxville.

== History ==
Since the late 2000s, Hardin Valley has become the fastest growing area in Knox County by population. Since July 2014, over 1,200 building permits have been issued in the Hardin Valley area, most of which include subdivisions and apartment complexes. With the growing popularity of the area, many current residents have become concerned of congestion issues along roads in Hardin Valley.

The Hardin Valley area, according to the Knoxville and Knox County Metropolitan Planning Commission, has a sustained 30-year growth rate of 3.9%.

== Geography ==
Hardin Valley is located in the westernmost portion of Knox County and is accessible by Hardin Valley Road, Yarnell Road, Lovell Road, Tennessee State Route 62 (Oak Ridge Highway), and the Pellissippi Parkway.

== Demographics ==
Historical population
| Census | Pop. | Note | %± |
|---|---|---|---|
| 1990 | 4,750 | | — |
| 2000 | 7,200 | | 51.6% |
| 2010 | 10,450 | | 45.1% |
| 2018 (est.) | 37,030 | | 254.4% |

According to a study performed by the Knoxville-Knox County Metropolitan Planning Commission, the population of Hardin Valley per the 2010 United States census, was 10,450. The community has seen an increase of nearly 2,000 residents every year since 2014.

== Education ==
=== Public schools ===
Hardin Valley is the site of several public schools operated by the Knox County Schools district. Public schools in the area include Hardin Valley Elementary, Hardin Valley Middle, and Hardin Valley Academy.

=== Community college ===
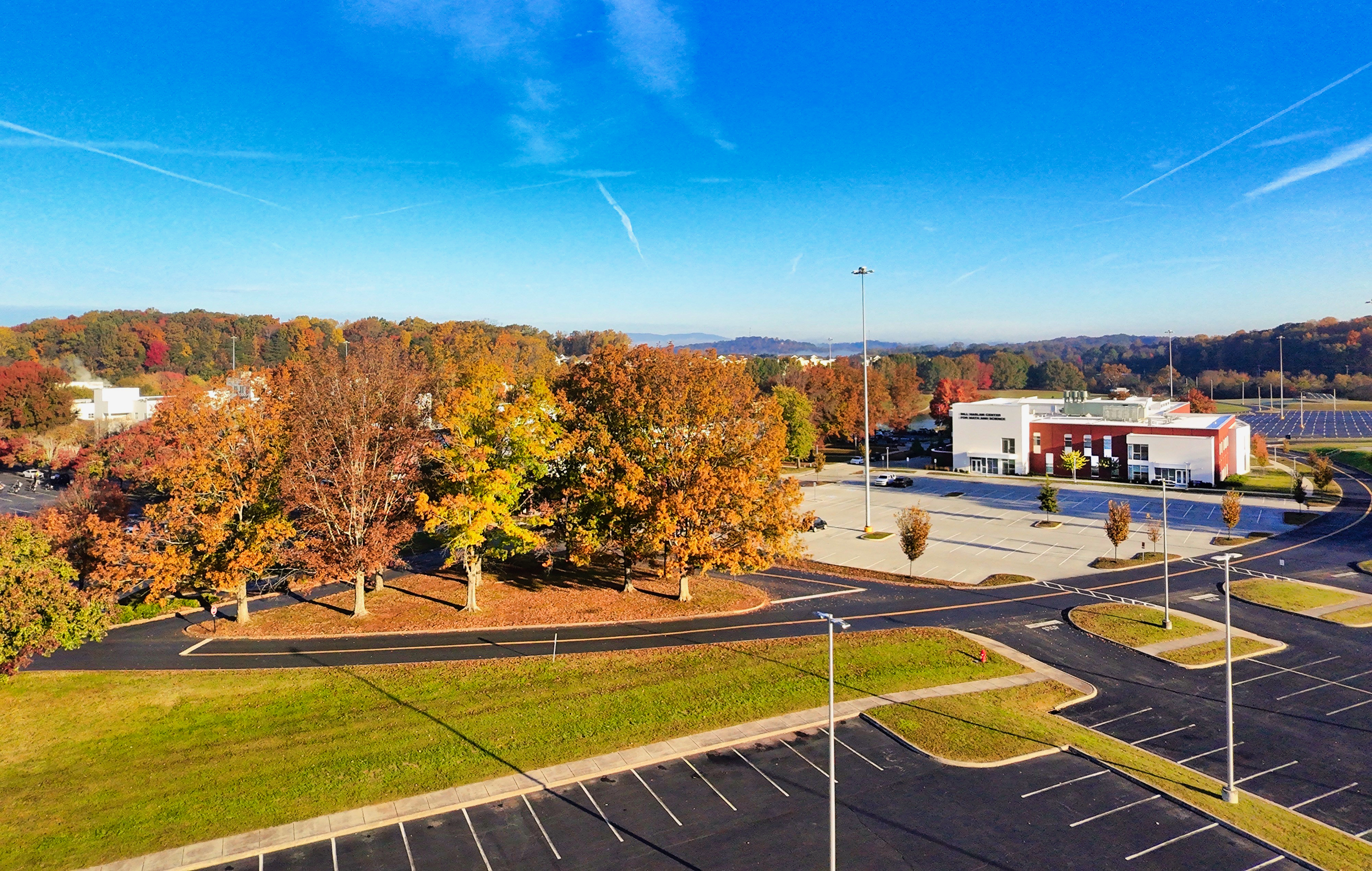
Pellissippi State Community College's main campus in Hardin Valley

Hardin Valley is the location of the main campus for Pellissippi State Community College.
