= Dogwood Arts Festival =

Festival in Knoxville, Tennessee

Coordinates: 35.9650°N 83.9194°W

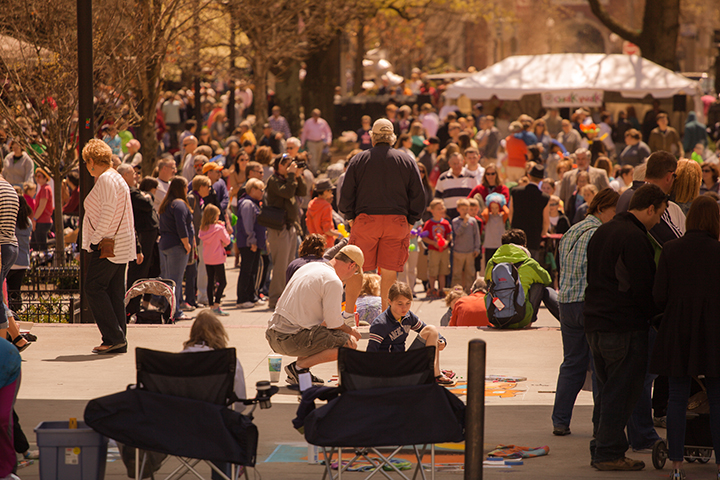
Chalk Walk during 2014 festival

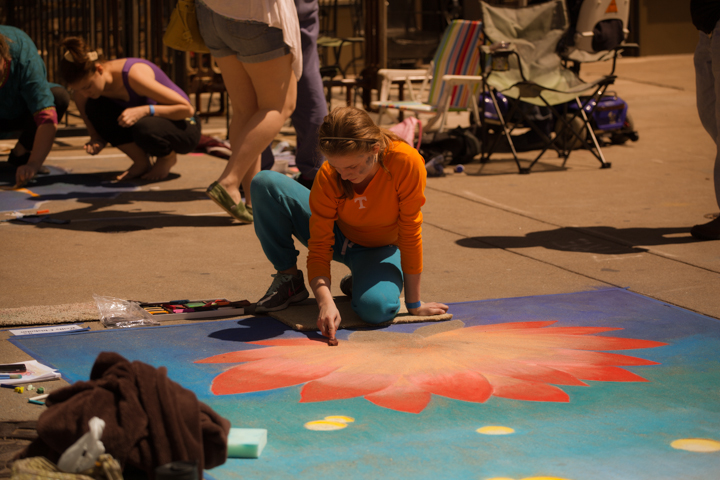
Chalk Walk artist at 2014 festival

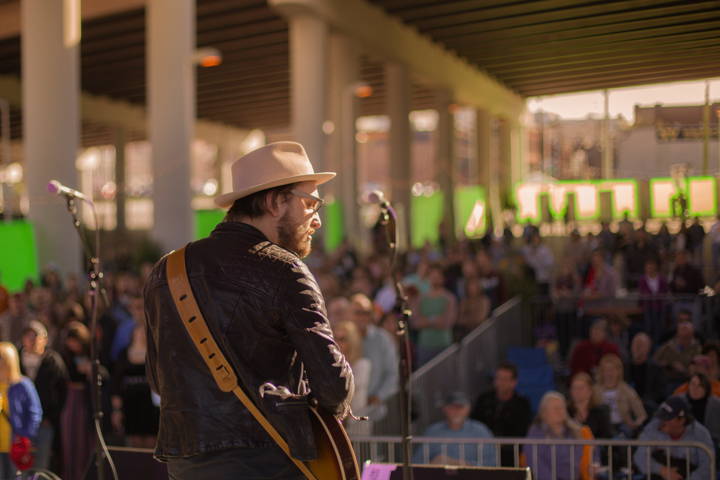
Musical performance at 2014 Rhythm N' Blooms Festival

The Dogwood Arts Festival is an annual event in Knoxville, Tennessee, sponsored by Dogwood Arts, a 501(c)(3) nonprofit organization whose mission is to promote and celebrate regional art, culture, and natural beauty. The event is held in April and celebrates the blooming of the dogwood trees. It includes a parade, a house and garden show, and demonstrations of various Appalachian arts and crafts such as quilting, bluegrass music, and doll-making. Many events are held in Market Square in downtown Knoxville. Additionally, driving trails are marked in Knoxville and the surrounding area for people to view the dogwoods in bloom.

== History ==
The initial impetus for the dogwood festival came from a description of Knoxville by John Gunther in his 1947 book Inside U.S.A. In that best-selling book, Gunther characterized Knoxville as the "ugliest city" in the United States, with what he called "an intense, concentrated, degrading ugliness." Other visitors to the city had also commented negatively on the city's appearance. In reaction to the insulting characterization of the city, Knoxville civic leaders started a community beautification campaign. Beautification efforts began with yard and neighborhood cleanups. In 1955, the first dogwood trail was designated in Sequoyah Hills. A second trail followed in Holston Hills in 1956, and additional trails were designated in 1957 in Fountain City and the Lake Forest neighborhood. In 1959, Knoxville News Sentinel columnist Carson Brewer proposed a dogwood festival, pointing to the successful ramp festival in Cosby, Tennessee, as a model for the potential success of a festival in Knoxville. The city's chamber of commerce and Junior League embraced the idea and contributed $20,000 each to make it a reality, leading to the first annual festival in 1961.

In 1995, journalist Paul Harvey praised the city's beauty during the festival, saying "there’s something about Knoxville that makes dogwood trees grow taller" and describing the dogwoods lining residential streets as "resplendent by day and moonlighted by night." Calling the city "a springtime blizzard of blossoms of dogwood", he noted the presence of other flowers, including violets, iris, May apples, lilacs, narcissus, and flowering fruit trees. He said that the festival attracted a quarter-million visitors each year.

In 2020, the event went virtual for the first time in its 66-year history, as the COVID-19 pandemic concerns caused cancellation of most art events.
