= Shady Grove, Knox County, Tennessee =

- Unincorporated community
- Location within Tennessee Location within the United States
- Coordinates: 35°49′18″N 84°10′45″W
- Country: United States
- State: Tennessee
- County: Knox

Government
  - Type: County commission
  - Mayor: Glenn Jacobs (R)
  - Commissioners: Angela Russell (R) (District 5); Kim Frazier (R) (At-Large); Larsen Jay (R) (At-Large)
- Elevation: 886 ft (270 m)
- Time zone: UTC-5 (Eastern (EST))
  - Summer (DST): UTC-4 (EDT)
- Area code: 865
- GNIS feature ID: 1647615

Shady Grove is an unincorporated community in Knox County, Tennessee, United States. Shady Grove is located near the Loudon County line in far southern Knox County, 3.9 miles (6.3 km) south of Farragut.
