= Heiskell, Tennessee =

Heiskell
- Unincorporated community
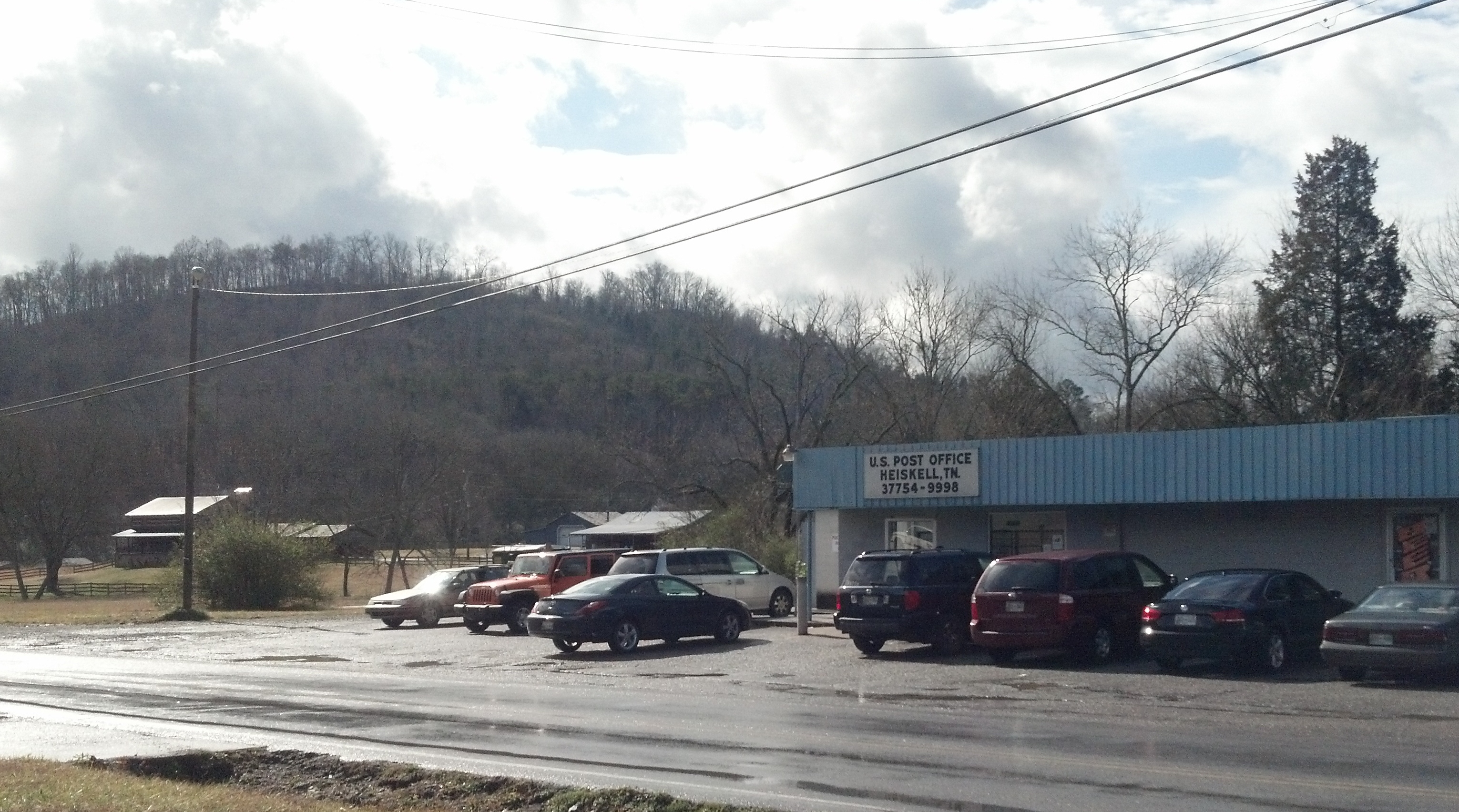
- Heiskell post office and farm scene

- Location within Tennessee Location within the United States
- Coordinates: 36°04′54″N 84°03′14″W
- Country: United States
- State: Tennessee
- Counties: Anderson, Knox
- Named for: Samuel Heiskell
- Elevation: 879 ft (268 m)
- Time zone: UTC-5 (Eastern (EST))
  - Summer (DST): UTC-4 (EDT)
- ZIP code: 37754
- Area code: 865
- GNIS feature ID: 1314130

Heiskell is an unincorporated community in Knox and Anderson counties, Tennessee, United States. It is the location of a post office, assigned ZIP code 37754.

Waste Management's Chestnut Ridge Landfill, which serves the metropolitan Knoxville region, is located in Heiskell near Interstate 75.
