= Island Home Park, Knoxville =

- Island Home Park Historic District
- U.S. National Register of Historic Places
- U.S. Historic district
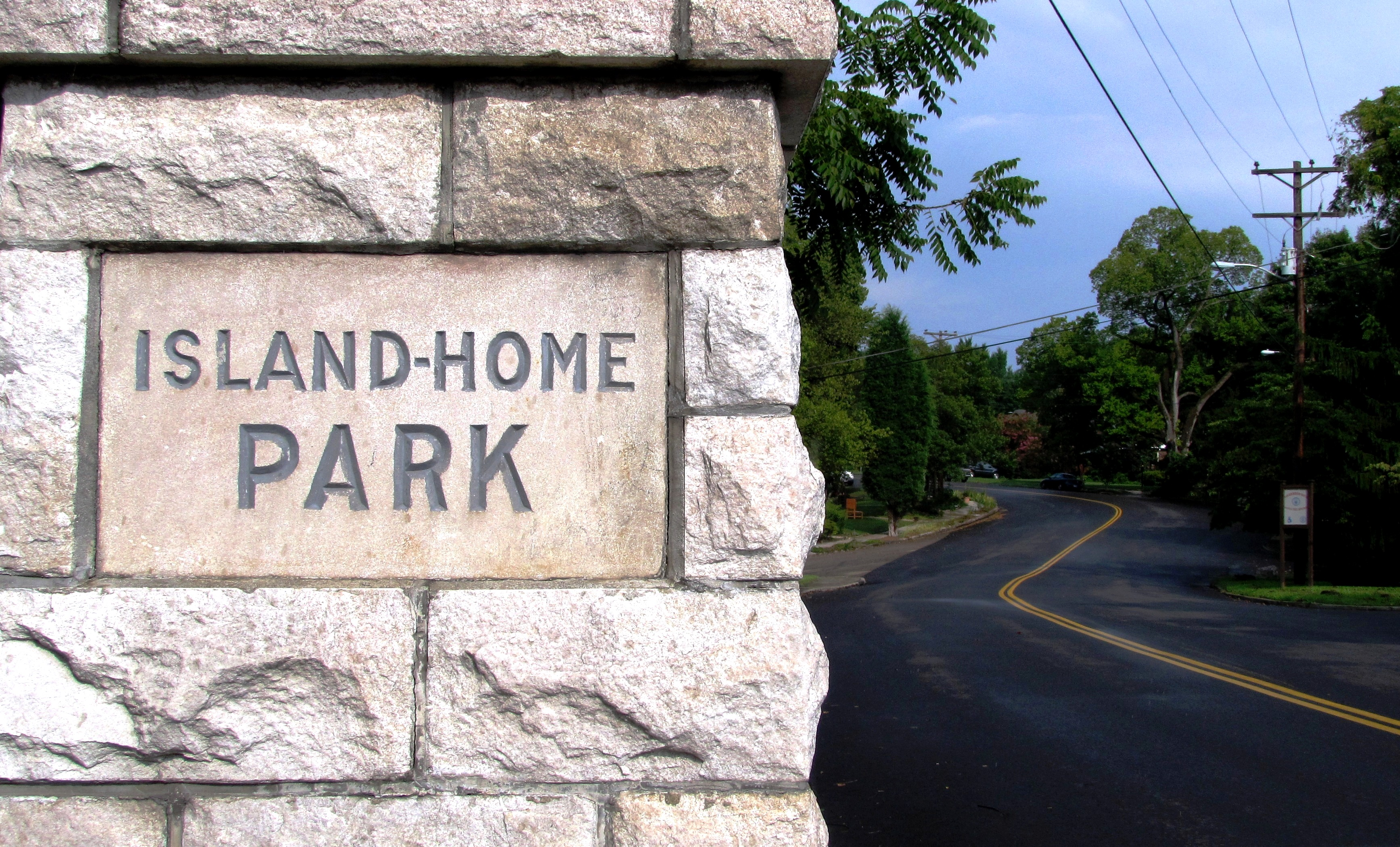

- Location within Tennessee Location within the United States
- Location: Bounded by Island Home Boulevard, Fisher and Spence places, and Maplewood; Knoxville, Tennessee
- Coordinates: 35°57′32.84″N 83°52′52.15″W
- Area: approximately 53 acres (21 ha)
- Built: 1899–1940
- Architect: multiple
- Architectural style: Bungalow/Craftsman, Tudor Revival, Colonial Revival, Minimal Traditional
- NRHP reference No.: 94001260
- Added to NRHP: November 10, 1994

Island Home Park is a neighborhood in Knoxville, Tennessee, United States, located in the southeastern part of the city along the Tennessee River. Developed as a streetcar suburb in the early 1900s, the neighborhood retains most of its original houses and streetscapes, and is home to the city's largest concentration of Bungalow-style houses. In 1994, several dozen houses in Island Home Park were added to the National Register of Historic Places as the Island Home Park Historic District.

What is now Island Home Park was originally part of a farm, named "Island Home," established by Knoxville businessman and philanthropist Perez Dickinson (1813–1901) in the 1870s. The completion of the Gay Street Bridge in 1898 led to the commercial and residential development of the South Knoxville area, and the Island Home Park neighborhood was established the following year. For much of its early existence, Island Home Park was home to a number of professionals and managers involved in Knoxville's wholesaling trade and other industries.

The campus of the Tennessee School for the Deaf developed adjacent to Island Home Park in the 1920s, and the Knoxville Downtown Island Airport developed on Dickinson's Island adjacent to the neighborhood during the 1930s.

== Location ==
Island Home Park is located along the south bank of the Tennessee River, just southeast of Knoxville's downtown area. The neighborhood is roughly bounded by the river on the north, the Tennessee School for the Deaf campus to the east, and Island Home Avenue on the west and south. Dickinson's Island, home to the Downtown Island Airport, is located in the middle of the river at River Mile 650.

Island Home Boulevard, a true boulevard with the right and left lanes divided by a grassy median, bisects the center of the Island Home Park neighborhood. Along with adjacent Spence Place and Fisher Place, it contains the neighborhood's oldest houses. Newer areas have developed to the south and west.

== History ==
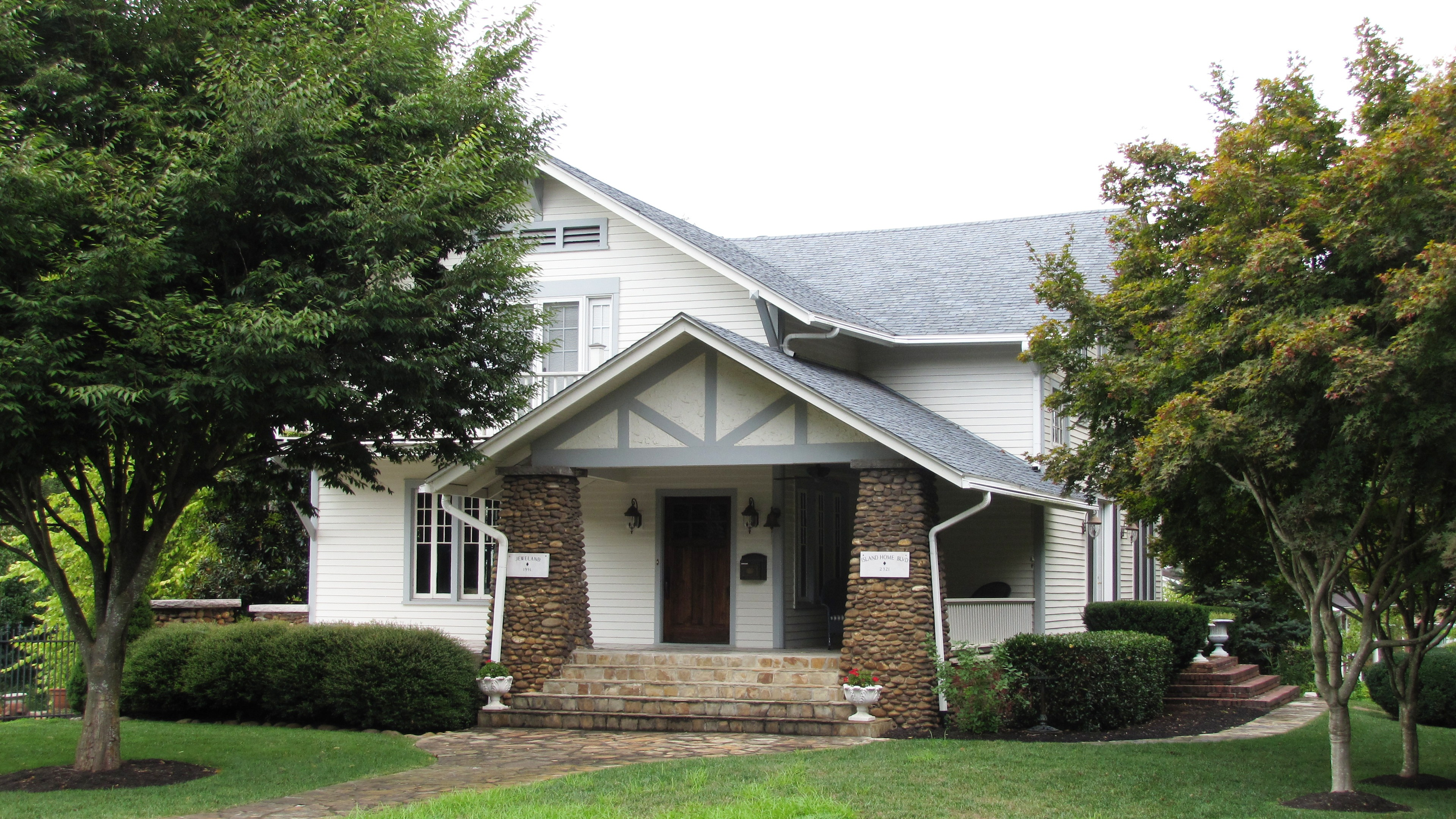
Bungalow-style house at 2321 Island Home Boulevard, built c. 1910

Knoxville businessman Perez Dickinson purchased what is now Island Home Park from Colonel Thomas Spence in 1869. Dickinson, originally a professor at East Tennessee College, cofounded the successful wholesaling firm, Cowan and Dickinson, in 1831, and helped establish the firm, Cowan, McClung and Company, just before the Civil War. Dickinson built a large Italianate house (now part of the TSD campus) on the property in 1875, and in subsequent years developed the land into a cattle farm. Dickinson named the farm "Island Home" after the island in the adjacent stretch of the Tennessee River (this island is now known as Dickinson's Island).

Dickinson's Island Home farm covered 600 acres (240 ha), with 200 acres (81 ha) criss-crossed by white picket fences. What is now Island Home Boulevard was initially the main approach road to the Dickinson house. Along with a summer home, Dickinson used the farm as a model stock farm. An 1879 issue of the Knoxville Republican described a McCormick reaper and binder demonstration at Island Home, which was probably the first use of the latter in the general region. Island Home also served as a gathering place for various clubs and societies.

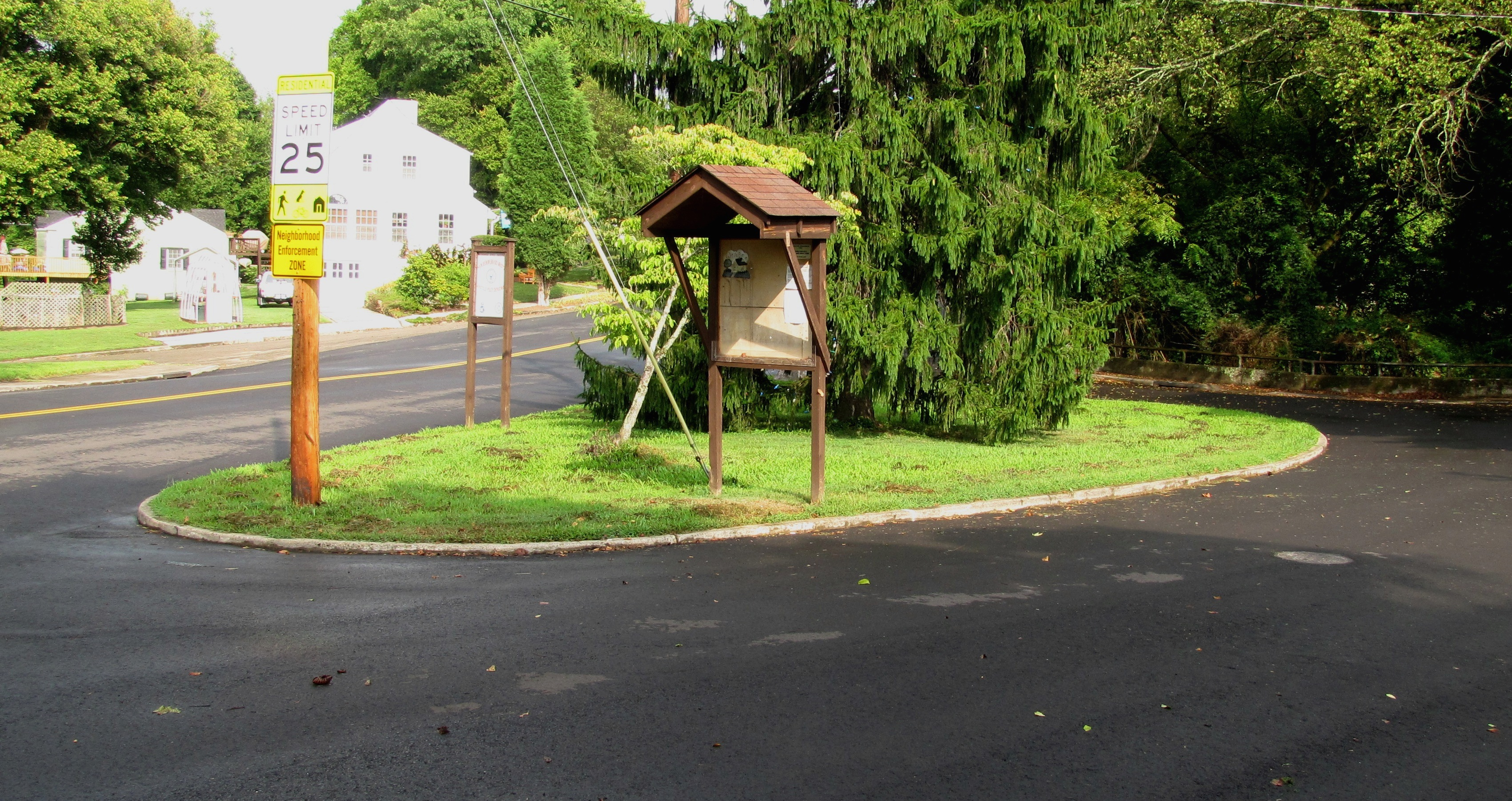
Former trolley turnaround near the western entrance to Island Home Park

The development of the Island Home Park neighborhood began with the completion of the "new" Gay Street Bridge in 1898. This new bridge was equipped with trolley tracks, connecting for the first time Knoxville and South Knoxville via trolley. The Island Home Park Company was founded in 1899 for the purpose of establishing a suburb on land acquired from Dickinson. Colonel Cary Spence (1869–1943), a World War I veteran and president of the Spence Trunk and Leather Company, was the Island Home Park company's president. Trolley tracks were extended along the length of the Island Home Boulevard median, and housing construction began sometime around 1910. Island Home Park was annexed by Knoxville in 1917.

Like most of Knoxville's early streetcar suburbs, such as Old North Knoxville and Fourth and Gill, Island Home Park's original residents consisted of middle and upper middle class medical and financial professionals, factory and retail managers, and Tennessee Valley Authority engineers and specialists. One notable early resident was actor John Cullum, who has spoken fondly of the neighborhood.

The Tennessee School for the Deaf moved to its present campus immediately east of Island Home Park in 1924, after selling its original school building on Western Avenue to the City of Knoxville for use as a city hall. The Downtown Island Airport is rooted in a charter flight service established by early Knoxville aviator Tom Kesterson on Dickinson's Island in 1930.

== Island Home Park Historic District ==
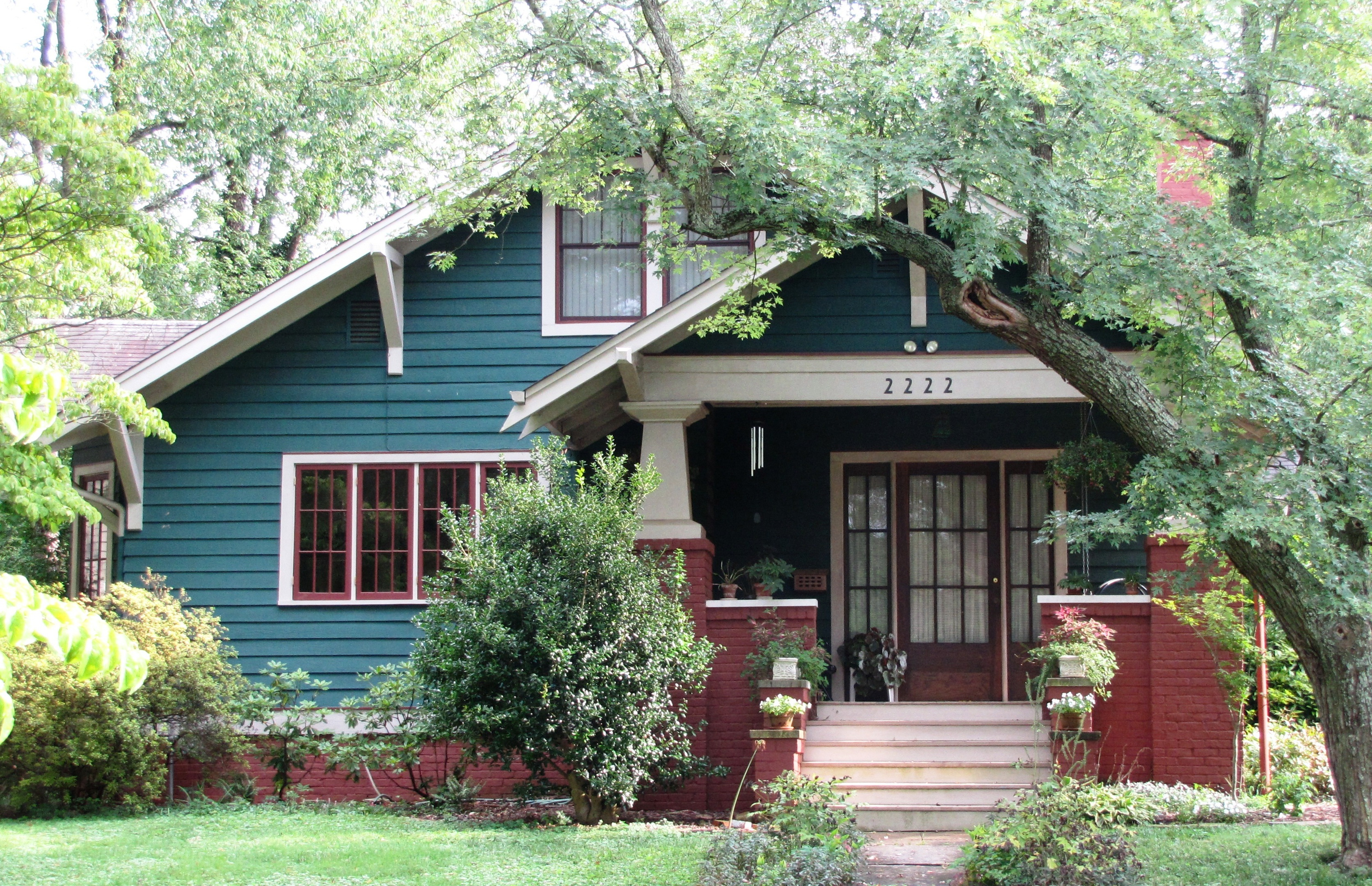
Craftsman-style house at 2222 Island Home Boulevard, built c. 1917

The Island Home Park Historic District consists of 91 contributing houses situated along Island Home Boulevard, Spence Place, Fisher Place, and Maplewood. The two stone gateposts at the neighborhood's western entrance are listed as contributing objects, and the trolley turnaround just inside the gateposts and the median along Island Home Boulevard are listed as contributing sites. Bungalow, Craftsman, and Tudor Revival are the most common architectural styles.

=== Notable houses ===
- 1900 Maplewood Drive, a one-story Bungalow-style house built between 1900 and 1910, apparently predating the general establishment of the Island Home Park neighborhood. This house is listed on the Register as 1900 Spence Place.
- 1936 Maplewood Drive, a one-story Craftsman-style house built c. 1915 to 1920. This house is listed on the Register as 1936 Spence Place.
- 2004 Spence Place, a two-story brick Colonial Revival-style house with French tile roof covering, built c. 1920. This was the home of Dual-Use Company president and Knoxville mayor Ernest Neal during the late 1920s.
- 2036 Spence Place, a two-story Craftsman-style house built c. 1916. This house was the home of Knoxville judge and businessman John L. Greer, best known as the owner of 1975 Kentucky Derby winner Foolish Pleasure.
- 2100 Spence Place, a two-story brick Tudor Revival house built c. 1927. During the 1930s, this house was home to TVA engineer Carl Bock, who helped design Norris, Wheeler, Pickwick, Hiwassee, and Kentucky dams.

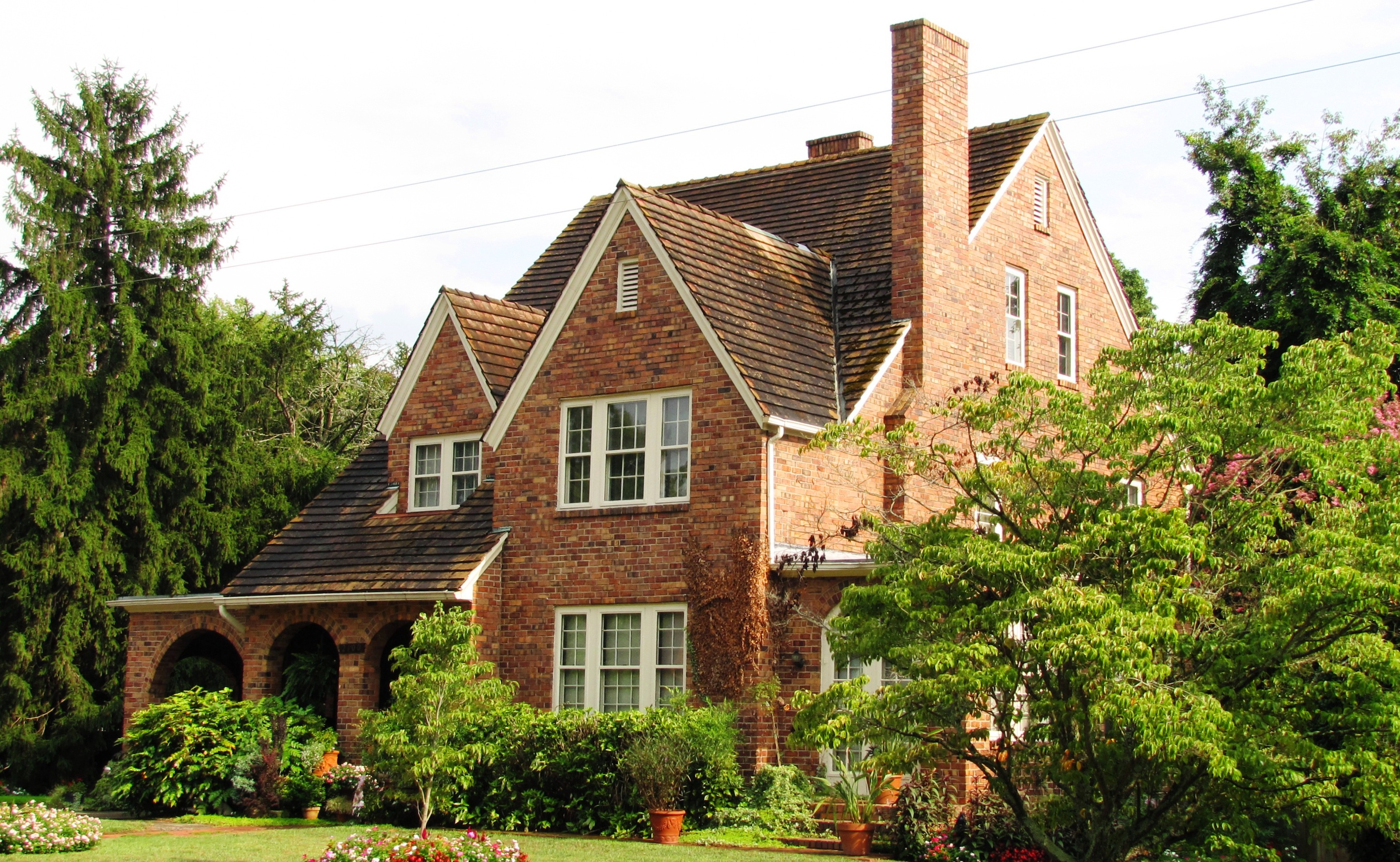
Tudor Revival-style house at 2100 Spence Place, built c. 1927

- 2000 Island Home Boulevard, a Craftsman-style house with a Neoclassical-style front porch, built c. 1915.
- 2103 Island Home Boulevard, a one-story Craftsman-style house built c. 1915. The house was originally home to Holt Engineering Company founder and Gatlinburg city manager Herbert Holt.
- 2200 Island Home Boulevard, a one-story Tudor Revival house built c. 1926. This house was originally home to Flenniken Construction Company president and Knoxville city commissioner John Flenniken and his wife, Laura. Country music pioneer Archie Campbell may have lived in a guest house on the property in 1936.
- 2221 Island Home Boulevard (Platt House), a two-story American Foursquare house built c. 1915. The Platt family, which moved into the house in 1928, consisted of Southern Railway roadmaster Joseph Platt, his wife, Elizabeth, and son, Samuel. Samuel Platt, who continued to reside in the house until the 1960s, grew up to become a prominent local physician, and served as president of the Knoxville Academy of Medicine.
- 2222 Island Home Boulevard, a one-story Craftsman-style house built c. 1917. This house was initially the home of Knoxville office supply entrepreneur William A. McCallie.
- 2227 Island Home Boulevard, a two-story [ actually referred to as a 1 1/2 ( see in Note 2) ] Tudor Revival house built c. 1932.
- 2237 Island Home Boulevard, a two-story Craftsman-style house with Prairie School influence, built c. 1912. During the 1930s and 1940s, this was the home of C. M. McClung and Company manager George A. Mary.
- 2245 Island Home Boulevard, a two-story Tudor Revival house built in 1927.
- 2316 Island Home Boulevard, a one-story Craftsman-style house built c. 1927. This house was originally home to long-time Knoxville Electric Company owner Lewis P. Self.
- 2321 Island Home Boulevard ("Jeweland"), a two-story Bungalow-style house with massive cobblestone pillars, built c. 1910.
