= Midway, Knox County, Tennessee =

Midway
- Unincorporated community
- Location within Tennessee Location within the United States
- Coordinates: 35°58′51″N 83°41′39″W
- Country: United States
- State: Tennessee
- County: Knox

Government
  - Type: County commission
  - Mayor: Glenn Jacobs (R)
  - Commissioners: Adam Thompson (R) (District 8); Andy Fox (R) (District 9); Kim Frazier (R) (At-Large); Larsen Jay (R) (At-Large)
- Elevation: 860 ft (260 m)
- Time zone: UTC-5 (Eastern (EST))
  - Summer (DST): UTC-4 (EDT)
- Area code: 865
- GNIS feature ID: 1312353

Midway is an unincorporated community in Knox County, Tennessee. Midway is 12.8 miles (20.6 km) east of Knoxville, just off Interstate 40 exit 402 (Midway Road).

Seven Islands State Birding Park is located just south of Midway.
