= Seven Islands State Birding Park =

State park in Tennessee, United States

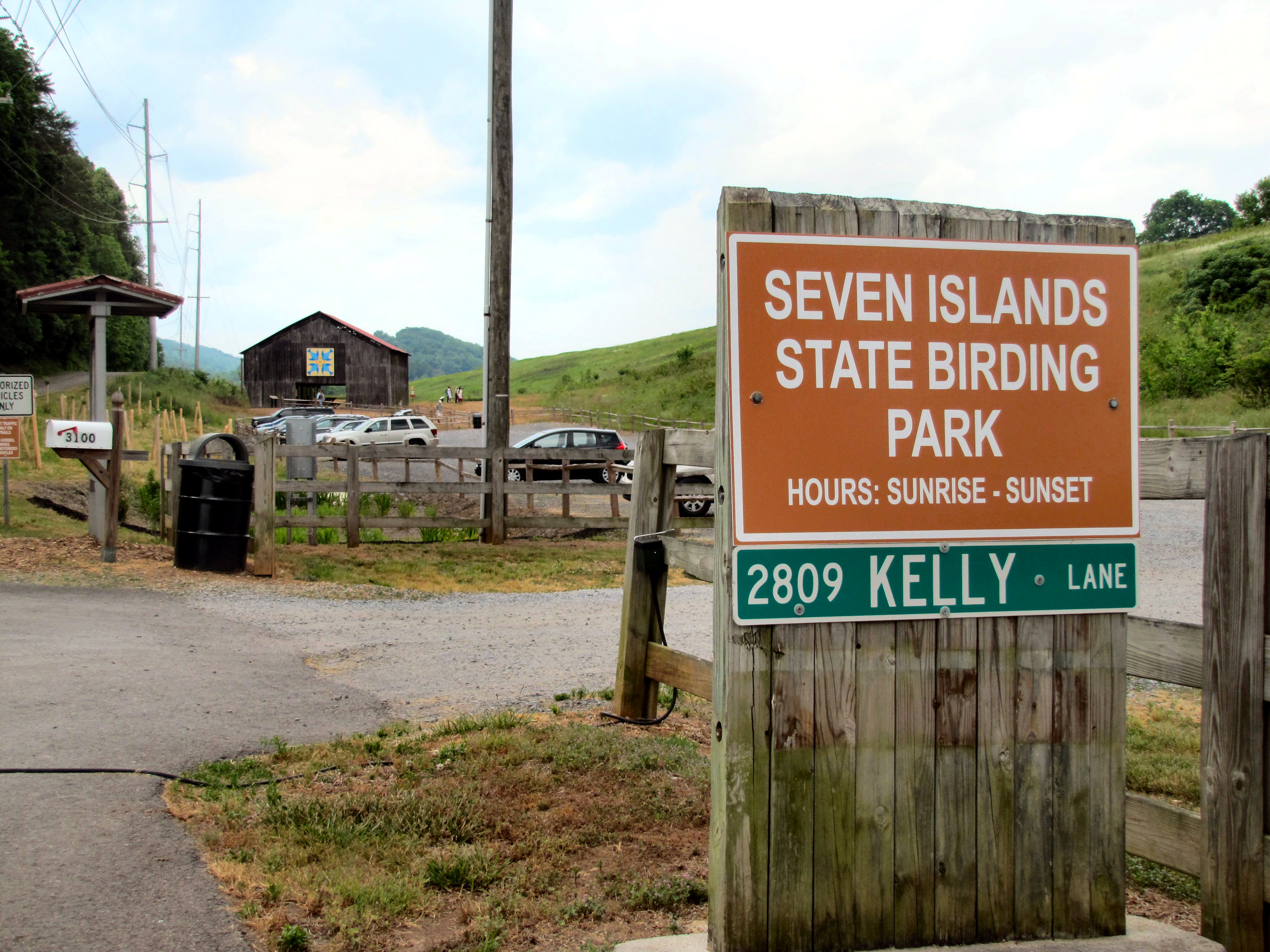
- Park entrance along Kelly Lane
- Interactive map of Seven Islands State Birding Park
- Type: Tennessee State Park
- Location: near Kodak in Knox County
- Coordinates: 35.946°N 83.692°W
- Area: 425 acres (1.72 km^{2})
- Created: September 2013
- Operator: Tennessee Department of Environment and Conservation
- Open: Year Around
- Website: Seven Islands State Birding Park

Seven Islands State Birding Park is a state park in Knox County, Tennessee located east of Knoxville near Kodak along the French Broad River. The park was created for birdwatching. The diverse grassland landscapes and the river create a habitat for more than 180 species of birds.

The park was opened on July 1, 2014 by state and local officials.

== History ==
For much of the 20th century, the park's land was part of a farm operated by the Kelly family, whose name is still attached to the river bend and the park's main access road, and whose farm house is still standing on the property. Preservationists gradually acquired the land and donated it to the Knox County Parks and Recreation Department. The Seven Islands Wildlife Refuge was created and initially managed by the Parks and Recreation Department and the Seven Islands Foundation, and later by the Legacy Parks Foundation. The refuge became Tennessee's 56th state park on July 1, 2014. The park's name refers to a string of small islands and shoals in the adjacent river.

== Birds ==
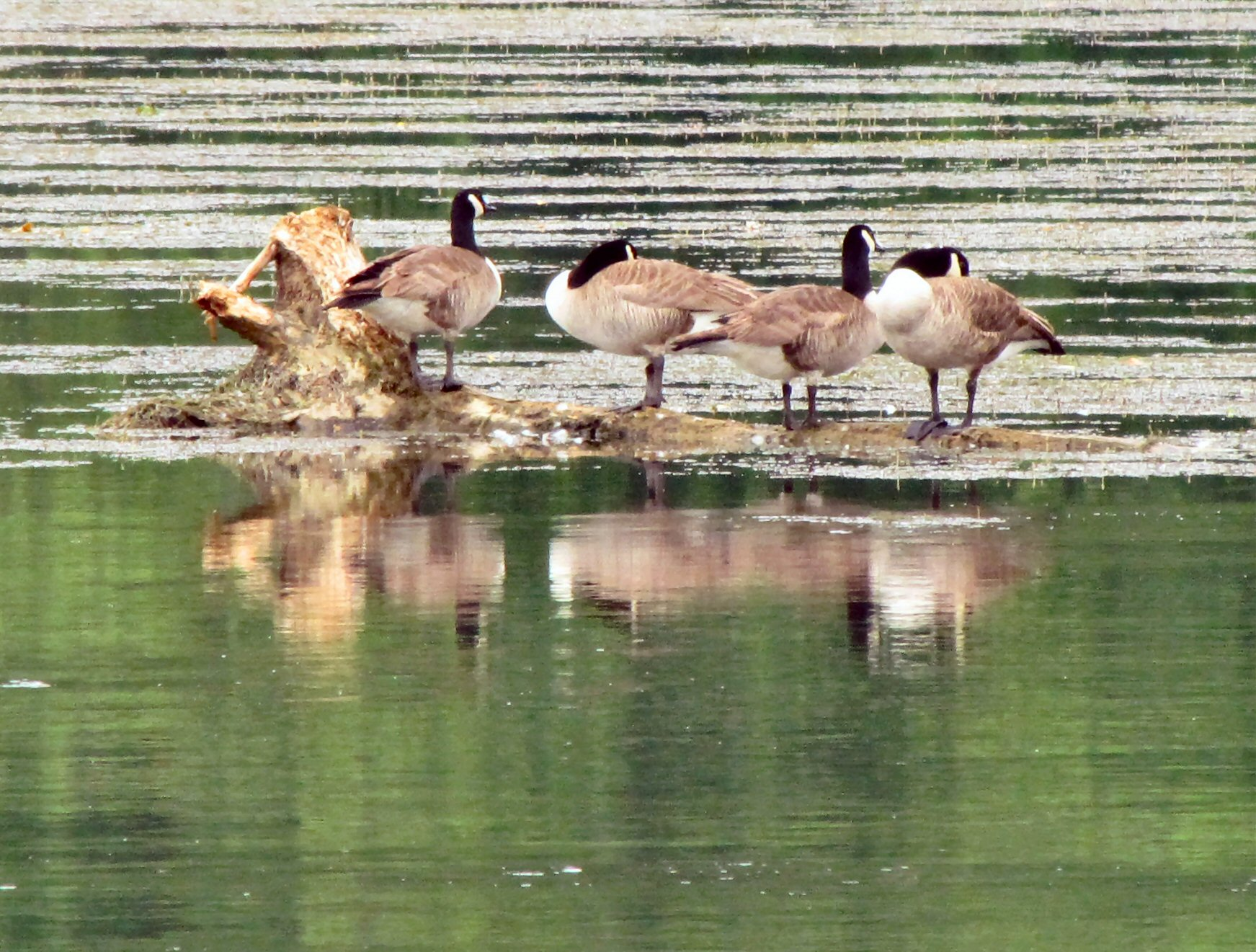
Canada geese resting on a downed tree in the French Broad River

Species of birds found within the park include purple martins, tree swallows, common yellowthroats, yellow-breasted chats, summer tanagers, blue grosbeaks, and indigo buntings. Sparrows are common in winter, namely the field, Savannah, song, swamp, white-throated, and white-crowned species. Barn owls have been known to frequent the old barns in the area. Waterfowl include Canada geese and mallards.

== Activities ==
Birdwatching is why the park was created but it also includes the following:

- 2 small canoe/kayak boat launch sites.
- 8 miles (13 km) of hiking trails.
- Biking and fishing may also be done at the park. Fishing can be done along the French Broad River.

== Location ==
The park is located approximately 18 miles (29 km) east of Knoxville, Tennessee.

The park is located along the French Broad River.

The park's address is 2809 Kelly Lane, Kodak, Tennessee 37764.

The park can be accessed from Interstate 40 via exit 402 (Midway Road).
