= Thorn Grove, Tennessee =

Unincorporated community in Knox County, Tennessee, United States

- Unincorporated community
- Thorn Grove
- Location in Tennessee and the United States Thorn Grove (the United States)
- Coordinates: 36.003971°N 83.695°W
- Country: United States
- State: Tennessee
- County: Knox

Government
  - Type: County commission
  - Mayor: Glenn Jacobs (R)
  - Commissioners: Adam Thompson (R) (District 8); Kim Frazier (R) (At-Large); Larsen Jay (R) (At-Large)
- Elevation: 1,001 ft (305 m)
- Time zone: UTC-5 (Eastern (EST))
  - Summer (DST): UTC-4 (EDT)
- ZIP code: 37871
- Area code: 865
- FIPS code: 47093
- GNIS feature ID: 1304089

Thorn Grove is an unincorporated community in eastern Knox County, Tennessee, United States. It is located 15.4 miles (24.8 km) east of Knoxville and 2 miles (3.2 km) north of Midway. It is included in the Knoxville Metropolitan Statistical Area.

== Geography ==
Thorn Grove is located adjacent to the Interstate 40 interchange at Midway Road, with I-40 connecting the community to Downtown Knoxville, and Midway Road connecting the community to Midway.

The interchange, along with tracts of land on Thorn Grove Pike and Midway Road were annexed by the City of Knoxville.

== History ==
Throughout its existence, Thorn Grove has been predominantly rural, residents of the community have cited to preserve bucolic lifestyle despite the construction of I-40 in the mid-20th century.

Since its earliest proposals in the 2000s, Thorn Grove is the location of the long-argued Midway Business Park, a 345 acres (1.40 km^{2}) commercial development project.

The project, blocked by a 2008 lawsuit, was eventually approved for construction in 2015 by the Knox County Commission. In late 2018, the business park broke ground, with an estimated completion date of its first phase in mid-2020.

The first phase of the Midway Business Park is expected to have the potential to create an estimated 1,800 to 2,000 jobs in the region.
