= Knoxville Downtown Island Airport =

Airport serving Knoxville, Tennessee, United States

Knoxville Downtown Island Airport Knoxville Downtown Island Home Airport

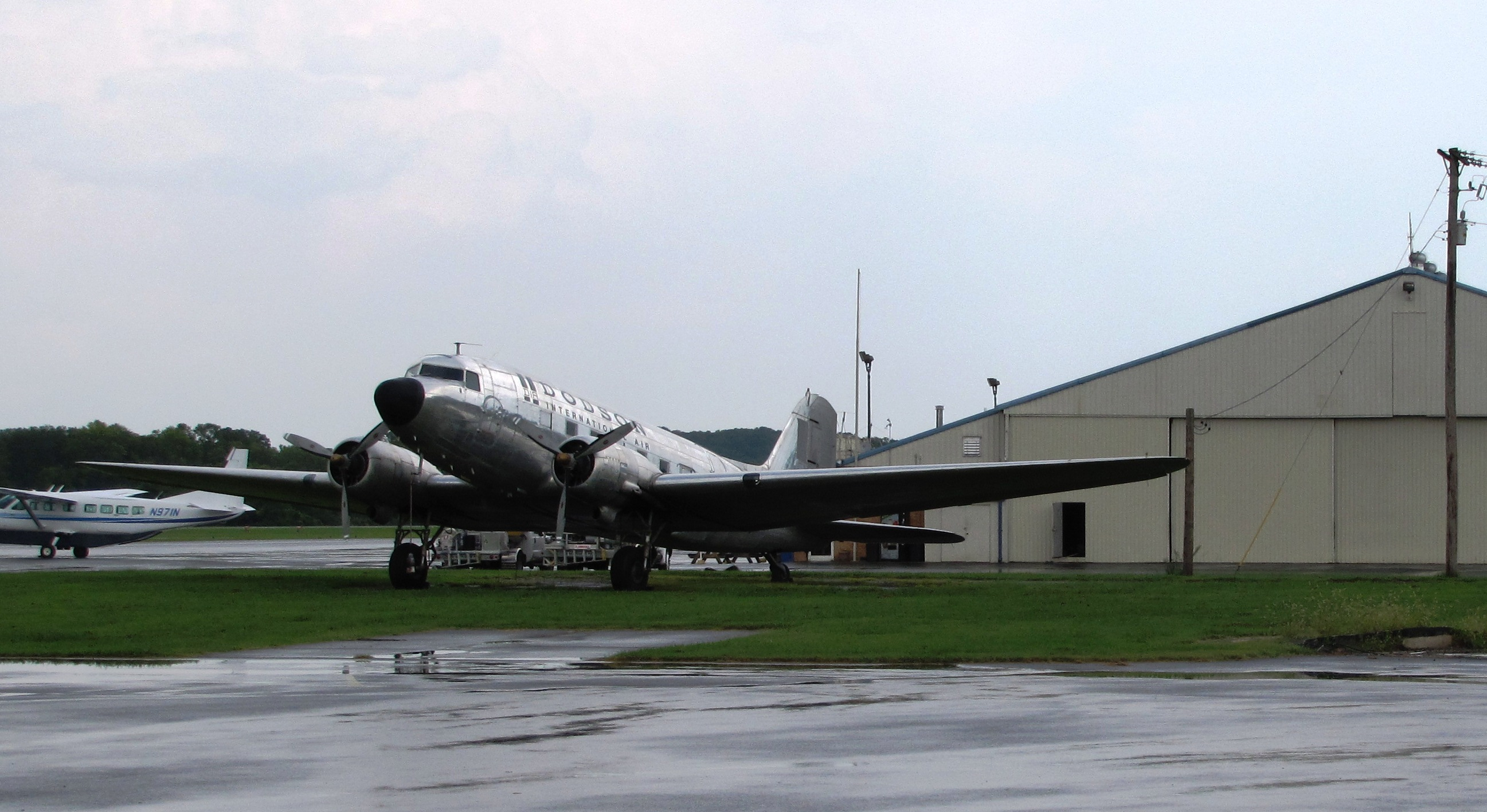
- Aircraft and hangar at the airport
- IATA: none; ICAO: KDKX; FAA LID: DKX

Summary
- Airport type: Public
- Owner: Knoxville Metropolitan Airport Authority
- Serves: Knoxville, Tennessee
- Elevation AMSL: 833 ft (254 m)
- Coordinates: 35°57′50″N 083°52′25″W
- Website: www.dkxairport.com

Map
- Location of airport in Tennessee KDKX/DKX (the United States)

Runways
Direction	Length		Surface
Direction	ft	m	Surface
8/26	3,499	1,066	Asphalt

Statistics (2022)
- Aircraft operations (year ending 7/28/2022): 76,700
- Based aircraft: 129
- Source: Federal Aviation Administration

Knoxville Downtown Island Airport or Knoxville Downtown Island Home Airport (ICAO: KDKX, FAA LID: DKX), often referred to as Island Home Airport, is a general aviation airport located approximately one-half mile east of downtown Knoxville, in Knox County, Tennessee, United States.

This airport is included in the National Plan of Integrated Airport Systems for 2011–2015, which categorized it as a reliever airport.

Although most U.S. airports use the same three-letter location identifier for the FAA and IATA, Knoxville Downtown Island Airport is assigned DKX by the FAA but has no designation from the IATA.

== History ==
Downtown Island Airport was established in 1930 by Tom Kesterson as a makeshift facility named Island Airport, located on Dickinson's Island in the Tennessee River. Kesterson was one of Knoxville's earliest aviators. He hoped the private airport, which had a 4,000-foot (1,200 m) runway, would attract commercial air service to Knoxville. In July 1934, American Airlines established a mail route that stopped at Island Airport en route to Washington, D.C., and New York City. Passenger service from Knoxville to Washington, D.C., was also offered on two daily planes that carried up to eight passengers. Regular airline service to Knoxville was initiated on January 15, 1936.

During the 1930s and 1940s, the airport site was used for aviation and farming. In 1941, the airport hangar was sold to Ferris Thomas, and in 1942 the operations were sold to Elmer Wood. In 1943, H.F. Wattenbarger purchased the property for use as a farm, but that same year, he began leasing the airport for wartime training of 300 Army Air Cadets. After the training program ended, Wattenbarger resumed operations at a private airport and farm. Robert Campbell, owner and operator of Campbell's Aero Service, became the airport's primary operator in the late 1940s, continuing for nearly two decades.

Evelyn Johnson, holder of the Guinness Book of Records entry for most hours logged by a woman pilot and most hours logged by a living pilot, started flying at Knoxville Island Home Airport in 1944. She recalls that she had to travel by rowboat to reach the airport.

The airport became a public aviation facility in 1963 under the ownership of the City of Knoxville. In 1978, it was transferred to the ownership of Metropolitan Knoxville Airport Authority, its current owner and operator.

== Facilities and aircraft ==
Knoxville Downtown Island Airport covers an area of 200 acres (81 ha) at an elevation of 833 feet (254 m) above mean sea level. It has one asphalt paved runway designated 8/26, measuring 3,499 by 75 feet (1,066 x 23 m).

For the 12 month ending July 28, 2022, the airport had 76,700 aircraft operations, an average of 210 per day: 99% general aviation, <1% air taxi, and <1% military. At that time, there were 129 aircraft based at this airport: 103 single-engine, 16 multi-engine, 8 helicopters, and 2 gliders.

DKX operates as an uncontrolled field. Up until 2007, a tower existed at the field. The tower was in service during World War II but, in later years, was staffed only during times of expected high traffic, such as Saturday UT football games in nearby Neyland Stadium. Due to asbestos in the cab, it was quarantined and later demolished by the airport authority; a new tower is under consideration.

== See also ==
- List of airports in Tennessee
