= Harbison Crossroads, Tennessee =

Harbison Crossroads, Tennessee Gibbs
- Unincorporated community
- Harbison Crossroads
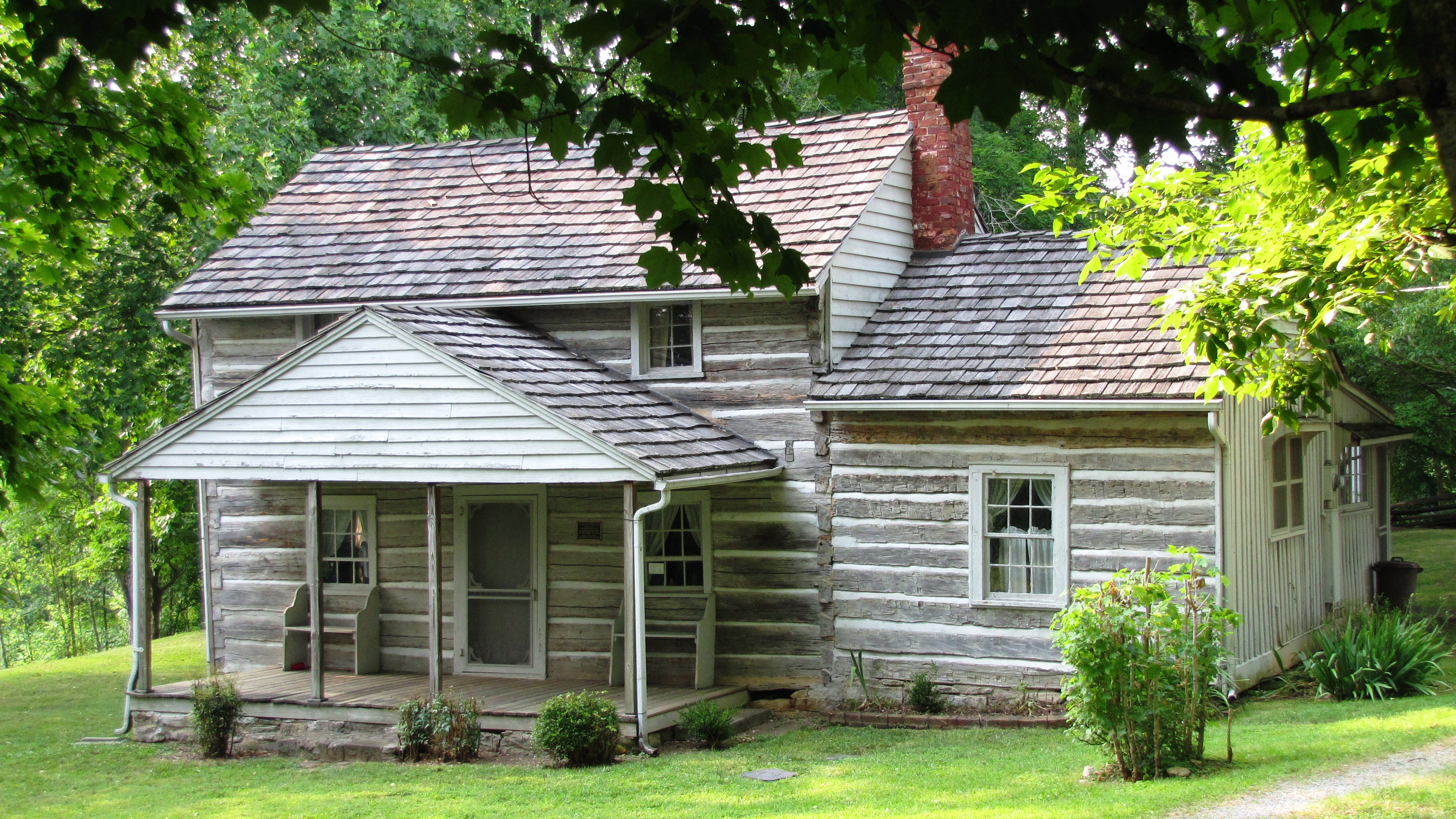
- Nicholas Gibbs cabin

- Location in Tennessee and the United States Harbison Crossroads (the United States)
- Coordinates: 36°07′15″N 83°51′09″W
- Country: United States
- State: Tennessee
- County: Knox

Government
  - Type: County commission
  - Mayor: Glenn Jacobs (R)
  - Commissioners: Adam Thompson (R) (District 8); Kim Frazier (R) (At-Large); Larsen Jay (R) (At-Large)
- Elevation: 1,109 ft (338 m)
- Time zone: UTC-5 (Eastern (EST))
  - Summer (DST): UTC-4 (EDT)
- ZIP codes: 37721, 37918, 37938
- Area code: 865
- FIPS code: US47
- GNIS feature ID: 1281332

Harbison Crossroads is an unincorporated community of Knox County, Tennessee, United States, located approximately 10 miles Northeast of Knoxville. It is also referred by the unofficial name of Gibbs.

== History ==
The area known today as Harbison Crossroads/Gibbs was first discovered by American Revolutionary War veteran James Harbison, who settled the area in the 1790s and operated a toll gate at the crossroads of Emory Road and Tazewell Pike.

Nicholas Gibbs, settled in the area following Harbison in a log cabin. Gibbs would later be used as the name of the area following Harbison Crossroads. The different names of the area has led to confusion, as state and county maps designate the area as Harbison Crossroads, and public schools located within the community are named for Gibbs, including Gibbs Elementary, Middle and High schools.

== Geography ==
The location of Harbison Crossroads today aligns with the intersection of State Route 131 and State Route 331 and known locally as East Emory Road and Tazewell Pike.

== Economy ==
Several gas stations, restaurants, a grocery store and Rural/Metro Fire Station are all found in Harbison Crossroads.

== Education ==
Gibbs High School, Gibbs Middle School and Gibbs Elementary School are all located on Tazewell Pike, just north of the crossroads.
