= David C. Chapman =

American soldier, politician, and businessman (1876–1944)

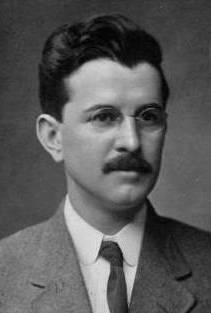
- Born: David Carpenter Chapman; August 9, 1876; Knoxville, Tennessee
- Died: July 26, 1944 (aged 67); Knoxville, Tennessee
- Burial place: Highland Memorial Cemetery; Knoxville, Tennessee
- Military career
- Allegiance: United States
- Branch: United States Army
- Service years: 1898–1918
- Rank: Colonel
- Unit: Third Tennessee Volunteer Infantry
- Commands: Fifth Tennessee Regiment – Tennessee National Guard (Later Fourth Tennessee Regiment. 1917–18.)
- Other work: Later led the establishment of the Great Smoky Mountains National Park.

David Carpenter Chapman (August 9, 1876 – July 26, 1944) was an American soldier, politician, and business leader from Knoxville, Tennessee who led the effort to establish the Great Smoky Mountains National Park in the 1920s and 1930s. Mount Chapman (in the park) and Chapman Highway (the section of U.S. Route 441 in South Knoxville), are named in his honor.

== Early life ==
Chapman was born in Knoxville to John Ellis and Alice Young Chapman. He attended the University of Tennessee from 1895 to 1897, and was a member of the Tennessee Kappa chapter of Sigma Alpha Epsilon. As a member of the fraternity he attended the 1896 St. Louis convention and served on the coat-of-arms committee that designed, presented, and had approved the Fraternity’s coat of arms. Despite not graduating, Chapman did play football for Tennessee.

== Military career ==
In the Spanish–American War, Chapman served as a Second Lieutenant in the Third Tennessee Volunteer Infantry and was the Aide-de-Camp to Brigadier General Leonard Wright Colby. When the United States entered World War I, Governor Thomas Clark Rye selected Chapman to reorganize East Tennessee National Guard, now part of the Tennessee Military Department. Chapman later became Colonel in the Fifth Tennessee Regiment, later renamed to Fourth Tennessee Regiment, before resigning on November 20, 1918.

== Civic leader ==
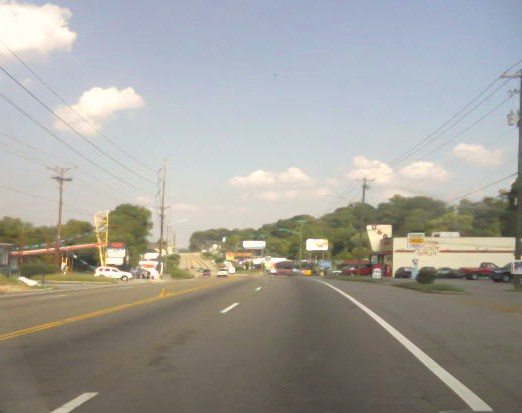
2010 picture of Chapman Highway, one of South Knoxville's main thoroughfares in Tennessee. The highway is named for David C. Chapman.

Chapman's father, John, began a wholesale drug company in Knoxville which David took over after his father's death. In 1910 and 1911, Knoxville hosted the Appalachian Expositions, in which Chapman served on the Board of Directors for both events. The purpose of both expositions was to raise awareness of natural resources of the Southern Appalachian region in the United States. Chapman, as a leader of the "Appalachian Club" (a recreational society for people with summer homes in Elkmont), became involved in the effort to create a national park in the Great Smoky Mountains. Additionally, Chapman was also active in various social clubs, civic clubs, and fraternal organizations in the Knoxville area.

== Great Smoky Mountains National Park ==
In 1925, Tennessee Governor Austin Peay appointed Chapman as East Tennessee representative to the Tennessee State Park & Forestry Commission, an appointment that came with the urging of the Smoky Mountains Conservation Association. The association voted to add the word "Great" to their name, giving rise to Great Smoky Mountains as the official and full name of the mountain range where the park would be located. Negotiations started as early as 1925, which was estimated to cost US$ 10 million (US$123 million at 2008 prices) and involve 6,000 private property owners, including large timber companies that owned most of the land. Chapman did most of the negotiations for the land purchases, even as he raised money to buy more parcels of the park. In 1927, the legislatures of North Carolina and Tennessee appropriated US$2 million (US$24.8 million at 2008 prices.) each while other donations came from individuals, groups, and school children who gave their pennies. John D. Rockefeller Jr. was even persuaded by Chapman and National Park Service Assistant Director Arno B. Cammerer to donate US$5 million (US$62 million at 2008 prices.) to ensure the park's success.

Two years later, the State of Tennessee created the Tennessee Great Smoky Mountain National Park Commission in order to purchase land for the proposed park. This land was then turned over to the United States federal government for use as a national park. Chapman was appointed the first commissioner, serving until 1932, but was retained as a member when a new commission was appointed later that year. Chapman and the temporary commissioner, George Roby Dempster, once engaged in a fist fight over an audit that charged US$11067 (US$174,643 at 2008 prices.) had been spent by the new commission in the last quarter of 1932 to purchase only 0.4 acres (0.16 ha). Tennessee Governor Hill McAlister abolished the Park Commission and transferred its responsibilities to the Tennessee Park and Forestry Commission after the Tennessee Senate approved in April 1933.

The park was officially established on June 15, 1934. President of the United States Franklin D. Roosevelt officially dedicated the park on September 2, 1940 with Chapman, the "Father of the Park", in attendance.

== Personal life ==
Chapman was married twice, first to the former Augusta McKeldin, and later to the former Sue Johnston following Augusta's death. He died in 1944 of congestive heart failure in Knoxville and is buried at Highland Memorial Cemetery.

== Legacy ==
Mount Chapman, a 6,340 ft (1,930 m) peak in the park is named in his honor. A stretch of US 441 in South Knoxville is also named in Chapman's honor as Chapman Highway.
