= New Hopewell, Tennessee =

- Unincorporated community
- Location in Tennessee and the United States New Hopewell (the United States)
- Coordinates: 35°55′42″N 83°48′02″W
- Country: United States
- State: Tennessee
- County: Knox

Government
  - Type: County commission
  - Mayor: Glenn Jacobs (R)
  - Commissioners: Andy Fox (R) (District 9); Kim Frazier (R) (At-Large); Larsen Jay (R) (At-Large)
- Elevation: 846 ft (258 m)
- Time zone: UTC-5 (Eastern (EST))
  - Summer (DST): UTC-4 (EDT)
- GNIS feature ID: 1314225

New Hopewell is an unincorporated community in Knox County, Tennessee, United States. The United States Geographic Names System classifies New Hopewell as a populated place.
