= Lonsdale, Knoxville, Tennessee =

Neighborhood in Knoxville, Tennessee

Coordinates: 35.98582°N 83.95791°W

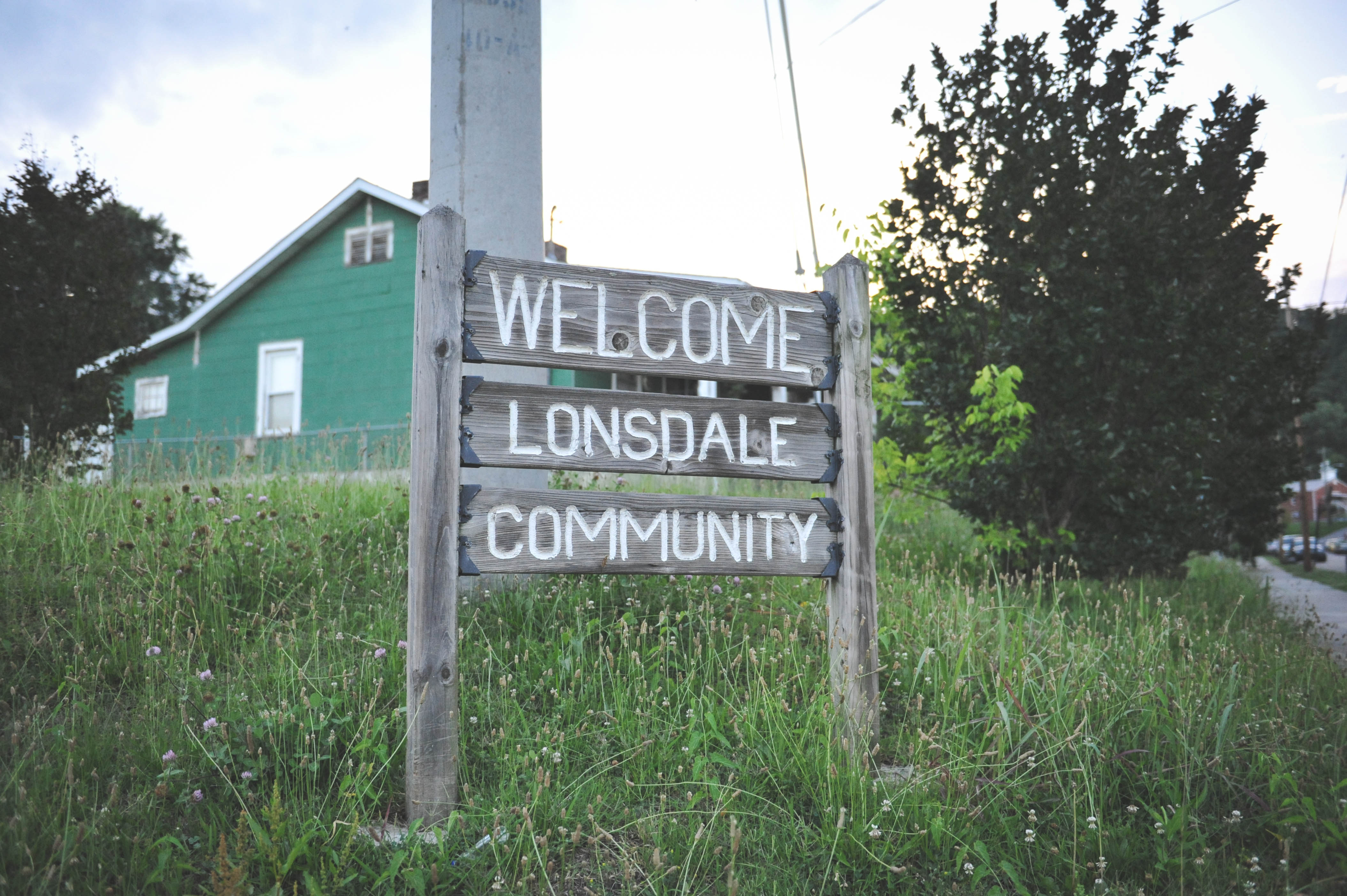
This is the entrance sign for Lonsdale on Heiskell

Lonsdale is a neighborhood in Knoxville, Tennessee, United States, located northwest of the city's downtown area. Established in the late-19th century as a land development project, Lonsdale incorporated as a separate city in 1907, and was annexed by Knoxville in 1917. After a period of decline in the latter half of the 20th century, Lonsdale has recently undergone several major revitalization efforts.

== Location ==
Lonsdale is located just over a mile northwest of Downtown Knoxville. Sharp's Ridge rises to the north of Lonsdale, Second Creek flows to the east (Interstate 275 runs roughly parallel to Second Creek), and the East Fork of Third Creek runs through the heart of the neighborhood. Lonsdale is traditionally bounded by Texas Avenue to the west, Heiskell Avenue to the north, and the Western Heights housing development to the south. Knoxville College and Mechanicsville lie to the south, on the opposite side of Western Heights.

== About the Neighborhood ==
Lonsdale boasts a well laid out grid with sidewalks. Lonsdale Elementary School and Lonsdale Park are at the heart of the neighborhood in the central block. The neighborhood is one of the most culturally diverse in the city. There are more than 10 languages spoken by residents.

=== Lonsdale Park ===
Lonsdale Park is located in the center of the neighborhood, sharing the central block with the elementary school. Louisiana Avenue, Connecticut Avenue, Burnside Street, and Stonewall street define this central block. Third Creek runs through the middle of the park, while it used to have water year round and supported an ecosystem, the creek bed usually only has water when it rains. There are two play areas in the park and a walking loop. There are two basketball courts and large pavilion with permanent picnic tables and charcoal grills. There are also large grassy areas that are great for kids to community members to set up soccer games!

== Urban Farming / Urban Gardening ==
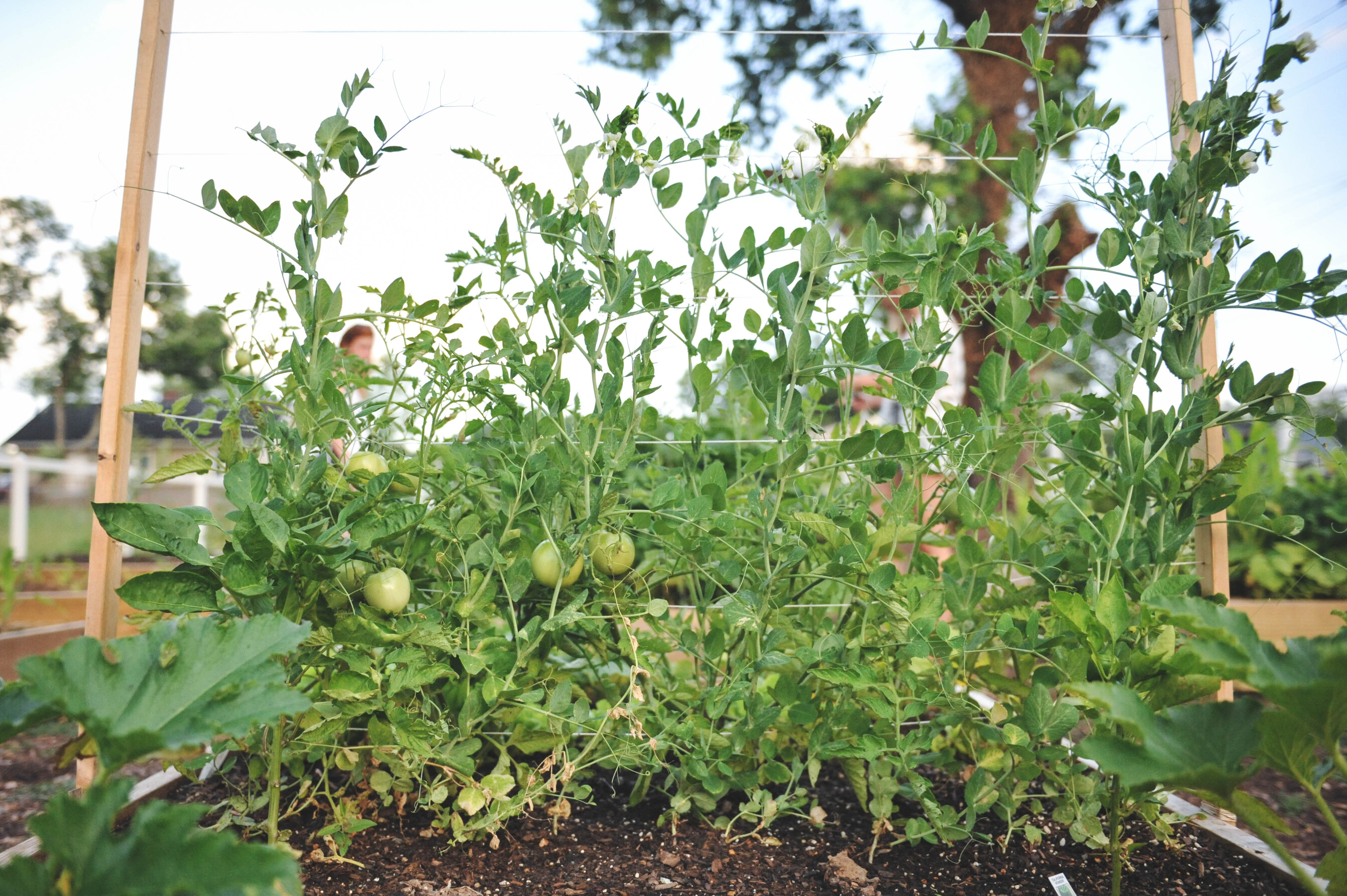
Lonsdale Community Garden on the corner of Louisiana Avenue and Burnside.

Lonsdale has the highest concentration of urban farming and urban gardening in Knoxville. With many immigrants from farming backgrounds, it is common to see front yards full of corn and beans. The neighborhood also has multiple community gardens.

== Lonsdale International Food and Crafts Market ==
From April - October, on the second Saturday of each month, you can find a culturally rich and delicious open air market under the pavilion in Lonsdale Park. Neighborhood residents come together and share aspects of their cultures by selling food and crafts. Cultures as diverse as those of Guatemala, Iraq, Honduras, and Mexico are represented.

== History ==
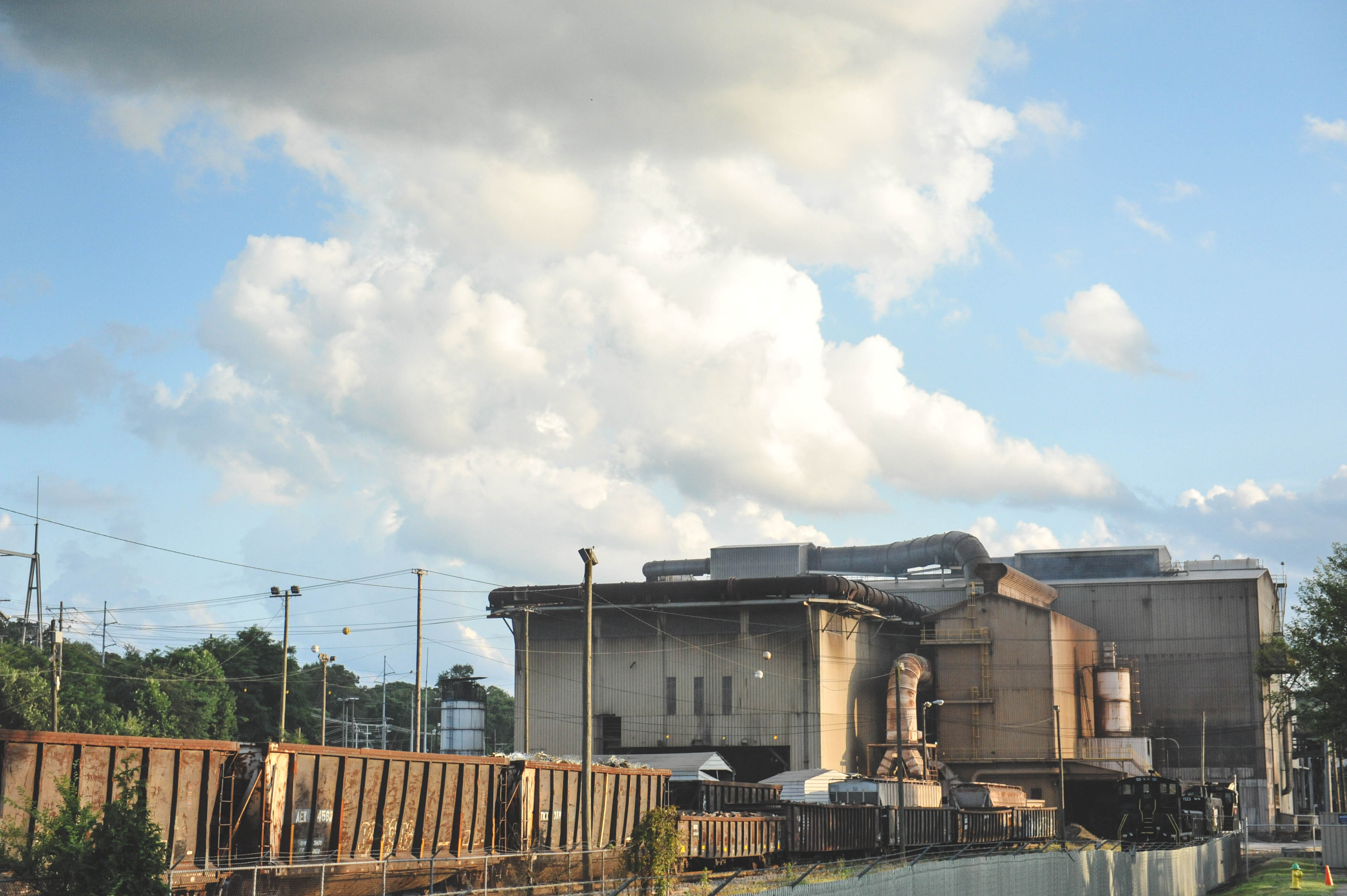
Industry in the Lonsdale neighborhood

In the late-19th century, what is now Lonsdale was part of a 240-acre (97 ha) farm owned by entrepreneur William Ragsdale. Noting the success of the nearby Knoxville Iron Company and its housing developments in Mechanicsville, Ragsdale decided to embark upon a similar venture for his property. In 1890, he recruited several dozen investors and established the Lonsdale Land Development Company, the name "Lonsdale" being a combination of his mother's maiden name, Lonas, and the "dale" in his father's last name, Ragsdale. In May of that same year, Ragsdale established the Lonsdale Mill Company to produce flour and provide employment for the new community. This company erected a four-story mill that produced 200 barrells of flour per day, which it marketed under the brands "White Rose" and "Sunrise."

Early Lonsdale developed in a manner similar to nearby late-19th century neighborhoods such as Lincoln Park and Old North Knoxville. A number of Queen Anne-style houses from this early period still stand in Lonsdale. Streets in the new neighborhood were named for Civil War generals (e.g., Burnside, Sherman, and Stonewall) and Union states. In 1892, the Lonsdale-Beaumont Water Company procured water rights, which helped draw more industry to area. These new industries, along with existing companies such as Brookside Mills, whose factory stood along Second Creek just southeast of Lonsdale, provided steady employment for the neighborhood's residents.

During the 1920s and 1930s, as local industries shut down in the aftermath of the Great Depression, moonshining and bootlegging became problematic in Lonsdale, and raids by the local police were not uncommon. Honky-tonks and dance halls, with names like the "Twilight Zone," the "Hound Dog," and "Sugar Hill," sprang up throughout the neighborhood. After World War II, many of Lonsdale's long-time residents moved away, leading to a large number of absentee owners, and many of the neighborhood's houses began to deteriorate.

== Revitalization efforts ==
=== City of Knoxville Efforts ===
During the 1970s and 1980s, Lonsdale suffered from increased crime rates and urban blight. In the 1990s and 2000s, Lonsdale United for Change, the Knoxville Community Development Corporation, and the Knoxville-Knox County Metropolitan Planning Commission initiated a series of efforts aimed at revitalizing the neighborhood. These efforts focused on the removal or restoration of blighted properties, the restoration of public parks, and a massive overhaul of Lonsdale Homes, a 65-building housing complex constructed in 1952. Several companies have recently opened stores or warehouses in the area, most notably SYSCO Food Services's 350,000-square-foot (33,000 m^{2}) distribution center.

=== Thrive Lonsdale ===
Thrive Lonsdale is an after-school and mentoring program for the youth of the neighborhood. It is located at 1317 Connecticut Avenue and formerly operated as SOAR Youth Ministries. The non-profit is explicitly Christian and serves over 130 Lonsdale youth daily.

=== We Love Lonsdale ===
We Love Lonsdale is an initiative of Thrive Lonsdale to bring together all the people, businesses, churches, and organizations that love Lonsdale and desire to see it thrive.

=== Fellowship Church's "Camp Reach" ===
Every year for one week in June and one week in July, Fellowship Church (located just under 7 miles southeast of Lonsdale) sponsors a "vacation Bible school" where volunteers are sent out daily for that week to Lonsdale on busses to pick up Lonsdale youth for the day camp.
