= Tennessee State Route 33 =

State highway in Tennessee, United States

State Route 33
- SR 33; primary in red, secondary in blue, unsigned in green

Route information
- Maintained by TDOT
- Length: 174.42 mi (280.70 km)
- Existed: October 1, 1923–present

Major junctions
- South end: US 411 / SR 61 at Georgia state line in Conasauga
- US 64 / US 74 in Ocoee; US 129 south of Maryville; US 321 in Maryville; US 411 / SR 35 in Maryville; US 441 in Knoxville; US 11 / US 70 in Knoxville; I-40 / I-275 / SR 62 in Knoxville; I-640 / US 25W in Fountain City; US 441 in Halls Crossroads; US 25E in Tazewell
- North end: SR 696 at Virginia state line near Kyles Ford

Location
- Country: United States
- State: Tennessee
- Counties: Polk, McMinn, Monroe, Loudon, Blount, Knox, Union, Claiborne, Hancock

Highway system
- Tennessee State Routes; Interstate; US; State
← SR 32	→ SR 34

State Route 33 (SR 33) is a primary and secondary route in East Tennessee. It runs 176 miles (283 km), from the Georgia state line in Polk County, northeast to the Virginia state line north of Kyles Ford in Hancock County. South of Maryville, SR 33 is a "hidden" route that shares a concurrency with US 411.

The section of SR 33 between Knoxville and Tazewell, along with US 25E between Tazewell and Middlesboro, Kentucky, was an inspiration for the song The Ballad of Thunder Road. In the song, a moonshiner runs illegal whiskey from Kentucky to Knoxville on this route. Sections of the former SR 33 in Union County have signs marking "The Original Thunder Road".

== Route description ==
=== Polk County ===
SR 33 begins in Polk County in Tennga at the Georgia state line concurrent with US 411 as its unsigned companion route. It begins as a primary highway. US 411/SR 33 go north and pass by the community of Conasauga and cross over the Conasauga River to enter Old Fort where they intersect SR 313. They continue north to Ocoee where they widen to four lanes and have an interchange with US 64/US 74/SR 40. US 411/SR 33 then continue north, then turn northwest and cross the Ocoee River before entering Benton. In Benton, they have an intersection with SR 314. They then leave Benton and continue north. They then enter Delano and begin a concurrency with SR 30. They then cross the Hiwassee River to pass by Hiwassee/Ocoee Scenic River State Park (via Spring Creek Road) and intersect with the eastern end of SR 163 before leaving Delano. US 411/SR 33/SR 30 continues north and crosses into McMinn County.

=== McMinn County ===
A short distance later, they enter Etowah. Here, they intersect with the western end of SR 310, before SR 30 separates and turns west towards Athens. US 411/SR 33 then leave Etowah and go north to Englewood, where they intersect and have a short concurrency with SR 39. They then continue north to cross into Monroe County.

=== Monroe County ===
They then enter Madisonville and have an interchange with SR 68. They then bypass downtown to the north and then leave Madisonville, going northeast. US 411/SR 33 then intersect and become concurrent with SR 72 before entering Vonore. In Vonore, they intersect SR 360 before crossing Tellico Lake/Little Tennessee River, leaving Vonore. Just before crossing into Loudon County, SR 72 separates and turns east, running along the banks of Tellico Lake. US 411/SR 33 then cross into Loudon County and go northeast to Greenback to intersect with the southern end of SR 95. They then cross into Blount County.

=== Blount County ===
They continue north to intersect the southern end of SR 336 just north of Lanier. They then intersect and become concurrent with US 129/SR 115 before entering Maryville. They then intersect with the southern end of SR 335 before entering downtown. Just before downtown, US 129/SR 115 separate at an interchange as Alcoa Highway, with US 129/SR 115 bypassing downtown to the west and providing access to McGhee Tyson Airport. US 411/SR 33 then go through downtown, where they intersect US 321/SR 73 before coming to an intersection with SR 35. Here, SR 33 separates and follows its own path with US 411 turning south on SR 35. Also, SR 33 becomes signed for the first time and turns into a secondary highway. It again has another intersection with SR 335, this time the northern end, before leaving Maryville to intersect the current eastern end of Pellissippi Parkway (SR 162; Exit 14) in Eagleton Village. SR 33 goes north through Rockford before crossing into Knox County.

=== Knox County ===
Shortly after crossing the line, it has an interchange with SR 168. It then enters Knoxville in the South Knoxville neighborhood. SR 33 then merges and becomes concurrent with US 441. US 441/SR 33 then cross into downtown via the Henley Street Bridge over the Tennessee River. In downtown, they become concurrent with US 11/US 70/SR 1/SR 71. They then have an interchange with I-40 and I-275. They then have an intersection with SR 62 not even a half block later. US 11/US 70/SR 1 then separate and go east, leaving US 441/SR 33 to go north, with SR 33 changing to a primary highway at this intersection. They continue through some North Knoxville neighborhoods, where they have an interchange with Hall of Fame Drive and unsigned SR 71 joins the concurrency, before entering Fountain City. In Fountain City, they intersect with the southern end of SR 331 just before an interchange with I-640/US 25W/SR 9. It continues through downtown Fountain City before leaving Fountain City and Knoxville all together. They then enter Halls Crossroads and US 441/SR 71 separate and go west, just before an intersection with SR 131. SR 33 then continues alone and leaves Halls Crossroads, traveling through rural unincorporated Knox County before crossing into Union County.

=== Union County ===
In Union County, it passes by the Knoxville Dragstrip before having an intersection and concurrency with SR 61 in Paulette. They then have a short concurrency with SR 144 before entering Maynardville. They go through downtown before SR 61 separates and goes east, then SR 33 goes north and leaves Maynardville. It then meets the eastern end of SR 170 in Hickory Valley before crossing Norris Lake and into Claiborne County.

=== Claiborne County ===
SR 33 then goes by a marina before going north to New Tazewell. It goes through New Tazewell before entering Tazewell. It goes through downtown to have an intersection and begin a concurrency with US 25E/SR 32. They leave Tazewell and go south through Springdale, before separating from US 25E/SR 32 and going northeast, just before another crossing of Norris Lake. SR 33 then becomes curvy before crossing into Hancock County.

=== Hancock County ===
Still curvy, it goes through rural unincorporated Hancock county and begins paralleling the Clinch River before entering Sneedville at an intersection with the northern ends of SR 31 and SR 66. It then turns north and enters downtown, intersecting the eastern end of SR 63. It then turns northeast again and leaves Sneedville. It goes northeast, still curvy, and parallels the Clinch River again all the way to Kyles Ford, where it has an intersection and short concurrency with SR 70. It then becomes a secondary highway and leaves the Clinch River to go north to the Virginia State Line, where it continues as SR 696, a short connector to SR 600.

== Major intersections ==
County	Location	mi	km	Destinations	Notes
Polk		0.0	0.0	US 411 south / SR 61 – Chatsworth	Continuation into Georgia; southern end of US 411 overlap; SR 33 begins as an unsigned primary highway
Polk				Bridge over Conasauga River	
Polk	Old Fort	3.1	5.0	SR 313 west (Ladd Springs Road) – Cleveland	Eastern terminus of SR 313
Polk	Ocoee	9.8	15.8	US 64 / US 74 (Ocoee Scenic Byway/SR 40) – Cleveland, Ducktown	Interchange; provides access to the Cherokee National Forest
Polk				Bridge over Ocoee River	
Polk	Benton	15.6	25.1	SR 314 south (Parksville Road) – Parksville	Northern terminus of SR 314
Polk	Delano	21.6	34.8	SR 30 east – Reliance	Southern end of SR 30 overlap
Polk	Delano			Bridge over Hiwassee River	
Polk	Delano	23.4	37.7	SR 163 west (Bowater Road) – Calhoun	Eastern terminus of SR 163
McMinn	Etowah	28.7	46.2	SR 310 east (Mecca Pike) – Tellico Plains	Western terminus of SR 310
McMinn	Etowah	29.5	47.5	SR 30 west (David W. Lillard Memorial Highway) – Athens	Northern end of SR 30 overlap
McMinn	Englewood	35.8	57.6	SR 39 west (Englewood Street) – Athens	Southern end of SR 39 overlap
McMinn	Englewood	36.0	57.9	SR 39 east (Tellico Street) – Tellico Plains	Northern end of SR 39 overlap
Monroe	Madisonville	44.5	71.6	SR 68 (New Highway 68) – Madisonville, Sweetwater, Tellico Plains	Interchange; provides access to The Lost Sea and the Cherokee National Forest
Monroe	Madisonville	46.0	74.0	Madisonville (Warren Street)	Interchange; southbound exit and northbound entrance only
Monroe	Vonore	51.9	83.5	SR 72 west – Loudon	Southern end of SR 72 overlap
Monroe	Vonore	54.3	87.4	SR 360 south (Unicoi Turnpike) – Tellico Plains	Northern terminus of SR 360; provides access to Fort Loudoun State Park
Monroe	Vonore			Bridge over Tellico Lake/Little Tennessee River	
Monroe	Vonore	57.0	91.7	SR 72 east – Tallassee	Northern end of SR 72 overlap
Loudon	Greenback	60.3	97.0	SR 95 north – Greenback	Southern terminus of SR 95
Blount		62.8	101.1	SR 336 north (Brick Mill Road) – Lanier	Southern terminus of SR 336
Blount		67.2	108.1	US 129 south (Calderwood Highway/SR 115) – Tallassee, Fontana, N.C., Robbinsville, N.C.	Southern end of US 129 overlap; provides access to Tail of the Dragon
Blount	Maryville	69.0	111.0	SR 335 north (William Blount Drive)	Southern terminus of SR 335
Blount	Maryville	71.5	115.1	US 129 south (SR 115/Alcoa Highway) / US 411 Truck north – Knoxville, Alcoa	Interchange; northern end of US 129 overlap; provides access to McGhee Tyson Airport
Blount	Maryville	72.6	116.8	US 321 (Lamar Alexander Parkway/SR 73) – Lenoir City, Friendsville, Walland, Townsend	Provides access to the Great Smoky Mountains National Park
Blount	Maryville	73.4	118.1	US 411 north / SR 35 (Washington Street) – Seymour, Alcoa	Northern end of US 411 overlap; SR 33 becomes a signed secondary highway
Blount	Eagleton Village	76.6	123.3	SR 335 south (E. Hunt Road)	Northern terminus of SR 335
Blount	Eagleton Village	77.0	123.9	SR 162 north (Pellissippi Parkway) to I-140 – Knoxville	Pellissippi Parkway exit 14; southern terminus of Pellissippi Parkway (SR 162)
Knox	South Knoxville	82.9	133.4	SR 168 (Governor John Sevier Highway) – Governor John Sevier Home, South Knoxville	Two-quadrant interchange; west to US 129
Knox	South Knoxville			US 441 south (Chapman Highway) – Seymour, Sevierville	Southern end of US 441 concurrency
Knox	Knoxville			Henley Street Bridge over the Tennessee River	
Knox	Knoxville			Main Street (east) / Cumberland Avenue (west) - University of Tennessee, West Knoxville	Former southern end of US 11 / US 70 / SR 1 concurrency
Knox	Knoxville			I-40 / I-275 – Nashville, Asheville, NC, Lexington, KY	I-40 exit 388; I-275 exit 0A
Knox	Knoxville			SR 62 west (Western Avenue) – Karns, Oak Ridge	Eastern terminus of SR 62
Knox	Knoxville			West Fifth Avenue - Asheville, NC	Former northern end of US 11 / US 70 / SR 1 concurrency; SR 33 turns primary
Knox	Knoxville			Hall of Fame Drive (unsigned SR 71 south; Southbound exit and Northbound entrance; southern end of SR 71 concurrency)	To US 11 / US 70 / SR 1, and Women's Basketball Hall of Fame
Knox	Fountain City			SR 331 north (Old Broadway) – Corryton	Southern terminus of SR 331
Knox	Fountain City			I-640 / US 25W (SR 9) – Nashville, Asheville	Exit 6 on I-640
Knox	Fountain City			SR 331 north (Old Broadway) – Corryton	Interchange; northbound exit and southbound entrance
Knox	Halls Crossroads			US 441 north (SR 71/Norris Freeway) – Norris, Norris Dam	Northern end of US 441 overlap
Knox	Halls Crossroads			SR 131 (Emory Road) – Powell, Corryton, Plainview	
Union	Paulette			SR 61 west – New Loyston, Big Ridge State Park, Andersonville, Norris, Clinton	Southern end of SR 61 concurrency
Union	Maynardville			SR 144 west (Hickory Star Road) – Hickory Star	Southern end of SR 144 concurrency
Union	Maynardville			SR 144 east (Alior Gap Road) – Plainview	Northern end of SR 144 concurrency
Union				SR 61 east – Luttrell, Blaine	Northern end of SR 61 concurrency
Union				SR 170 west (Hickory Valley Road) – Hickory Star, New Loyston, Heiskell, Oak Ridge	Y-Intersection; eastern terminus of SR 170
Norris Lake/Clinch River				Bridge over Norris Lake/Clinch River; Union-Clairborne County line is northeast of the bridge.	
Claiborne	Tazewell			US 25E north (SR 32/Dixie Highway) – Harrogate, Cumberland Gap	Southern end of wrong-way US 25E concurrency;
Claiborne				US 25E (SR 32/Dixie Highway) – Thorn Hill, Bean Station, Morristown	Northern end of wrong-way US 25E concurrency; To I-81
Hancock	Sneedville			SR 31 south / SR 66 south (Main Street) – Rogersville	Northern terminus of SR 66 / 31
Hancock	Sneedville			SR 63 west (College Street) – Harrogate, LaFollette	Eastern terminus of SR 63
Hancock	Kyles Ford			SR 70 north (Trail of the Lonesome Pine) – Jonesville, VA	Southern end of wrong-way SR 70 concurrency
Hancock	Kyles Ford			SR 70 south (Trail of the Lonesome Pine) – Edison, Pressmen's Home, Rogersville	Northern end of wrong-way SR 70 concurrency; SR 33 turns secondary
Hancock		174.42	280.70	SR 696 (Joe Moller Road) to SR 600 – Blackwater, VA, Clinchport, VA	Tennessee-Virginia State Line at Dona, VA; Northern terminus of SR 33
1.000 mi = 1.609 km; 1.000 km = 0.621 mi: Concurrency terminus; Incomplete access
