= Tennessee State Route 335 =

State highway in Tennessee, United States

State Route 335
- TN 335 highlighted in red

Route information
- Maintained by TDOT
- Length: 11.0 mi (17.7 km)
- Existed: July 1, 1983–present

Major junctions
- South end: US 129 / US 411 in Maryville
- US 321 in Maryville; US 129 in Alcoa
- North end: SR 33 in Eagleton Village

Location
- Country: United States
- State: Tennessee
- Counties: Blount

Highway system
- Tennessee State Routes; Interstate; US; State
← SR 334	→ SR 336

State Route 335 (SR 335) is an 11-mile-long (18 km) north–south state highway in Blount County, Tennessee. It forms a semicircle around the western half of the Maryville-Alcoa metro area.

Along its length, SR 335 is known by several street names: William Blount Drive, Old Glory Road, W Hunt Road, and E Hunt Road.

== Route description ==
SR 335 begins as William Blount Drive in Maryville at an intersection with US 129/US 411 (SR 33/SR 115). It goes northwest to leave the Maryville city limits and pass through suburban areas to have a signalized intersection with Morganton Road. The highway then passes by William Blount Highschool and several businesses before having a signalized intersection with Big Springs Road. SR 335 then reenters the Maryville city limits and comes to an intersection and becomes concurrent with US 321 (W Lamar Alexander Parkway/SR 73). It follows US 321 north for approximately 0.6 miles before turning north along Old Glory Road. The highway then leaves the Maryville city limits for the last time and travels through a mix of farmland and suburbs before entering Alcoa at an intersection with Middlesettlements Road. SR 335 becomes W Hunt Road and passes by subdivisions before coming to an intersection with the southern end of SR 334 (Louisville Road). It turns right onto Louisville Road (not SR 334) for 300 feet before turning back northeast along W Hunt Road. The highway passes through neighborhoods before following along the southern edge of McGhee Tyson Airport to have an interchange with US 129 (Alcoa Highway/SR 115). SR 335 goes east as E Hunt Road through a mix of farmland and suburbs before crossing the Little River and entering Eagleton Village. The highway then comes to an end at an intersection with SR 33 (Old Knoxville Highway). Excluding the concurrency with US 321 (W Lamar Alexander Parkway/SR 73), the entire route of SR 335 is a two-lane highway.

== Major intersections ==
The entire route is in Blount County.

Location	mi	km	Destinations	Notes
Maryville	0.0	0.0	US 129 / US 411 (SR 33/SR 115) – Greenback, Tallassee, Downtown	Southern terminus
Maryville			US 321 south (W Lamar Alexander Parkway/SR 73 west) – Friendsville, Lenoir City	Southern end of US 321/SR 73 concurrency
Maryville			US 321 north (W Lamar Alexander Parkway/SR 73 east) – Downtown	Northern end of US 321/SR 73 concurrency
Alcoa			SR 334 north (Louisville Road) – Louisville Louisville Road to US 129 - Downtown	Southern terminus of SR 334
Alcoa			US 129 (Alcoa Highway/SR 115) – Knoxville, Downtown	Interchange; provides access to McGhee Tyson Airport
Alcoa–Eagleton Village line			Bridge over the Little River	
Eagleton Village	11.0	17.7	SR 33 (Old Knoxville Highway) to I-140 – Rockford, Alcoa, Maryville	Northern terminus
1.000 mi = 1.609 km; 1.000 km = 0.621 mi: Concurrency terminus
