= Tennessee State Route 336 =

State highway in Tennessee, United States

State Route 336
- TN 336 highlighted in red

Route information
- Maintained by TDOT
- Length: 19.6 mi (31.5 km)
- Existed: July 1, 1983–present

Major junctions
- South end: US 411 near Greenback
- US 129 in Lanier
- North end: US 321 in Maryville

Location
- Country: United States
- State: Tennessee
- Counties: Blount

Highway system
- Tennessee State Routes; Interstate; US; State
| ← SR 335 | → SR 337 |

State Route 336 (SR 336) is a 19.6-mile-long (31.5 km) north–south state highway in central Blount County, Tennessee.

== Route description ==
SR 336 begins at an intersection with US 411 (SR 33) just east of Greenback. It travels south through farmland as Brick Mill Road to the community of Lanier, where it has an intersection with US 129 (Calderwood Highway/SR 115). The highway turns northeast through hilly and wooded terrain as 6 Mile Road to the community of Six Mile, where it makes a sharp left at an intersection with Montvale Road and Old Piney Road. SR 336 goes north to pass through a ridge as Montvale Road before passing through farmland and suburbs to enter Maryville. It passes through neighborhoods before coming to an end at an intersection with US 321 (W Lamar Alexander Parkway/SR 73).

== Major intersections ==
The entire route is in Blount County.

| Location | mi | km | Destinations | Notes |
|---|---|---|---|---|
| | 0.0 | 0.0 | US 411 (SR 33) – Vonore, Greenback, Maryville | Southern terminus |
| Lanier | 3.7 | 6.0 | US 129 (Calderwood Highway/SR 115) – Maryville, Tallassee | Provides access to Tail of the Dragon and the Foothills Parkway |
| Maryville | 19.6 | 31.5 | US 321 (W Lamar Alexander Parkway/SR 73) – Lenoir City, Friendsville, Townsend, Pigeon Forge | Northern terminus; provides access to Fort Loudoun Lake and Great Smoky Mountains National Park |
1.000 mi = 1.609 km; 1.000 km = 0.621 mi
