= U.S. Route 129 in Tennessee =

Segment of American highway

U.S. Route 129
- US 129 highlighted in red

Route information
- Maintained by TDOT
- Length: 52.8 mi (85.0 km)
- Existed: 1934–present

Major junctions
- South end: US 129 at the North Carolina line at Deals Gap, NC
- US 411 in Maryville; US 321 in Maryville; I-140 / SR 162 in Alcoa; US 11 / US 70 in Knoxville
- North end: I-40 in Knoxville

Location
- Country: United States
- State: Tennessee
- Counties: Blount, Monroe, Knox

Highway system
- United States Numbered Highway System; List; Special; Divided; Tennessee State Routes; Interstate; US; State
← SR 114	SR 115	→ SR 116
← SR 128	US 129	→ SR 129

U.S. Route 129 (US 129) is a north–south United States highway that runs for 52.8 miles (85.0 km) in East Tennessee, from the North Carolina state line, near Tapoco, to Knoxville. In Tennessee, the highway is completely overlapped by unsigned (except for mileposts) State Route 115 (SR 115). The section of US 129 between the North Carolina state line and Tallassee runs along the Little Tennessee River and the western boundary of the Great Smoky Mountains National Park. Known as the "Tail of the Dragon", this two-lane section is extremely curvy, and is popular with sports car enthusiasts and motorcyclists. In the Greater Knoxville area, US 129 serves as a four to six-lane controlled-access highway known as Alcoa Highway, currently undergoing a long-term upgrade.

U.S. Route 129 crosses the Tennessee River on J. E. Karnes Bridge in Knoxville

== Route description ==
=== "Tail of the Dragon" and Calderwood Highway ===
U.S. 129 enters Tennessee from North Carolina at through the Deals Gap mountain pass through the western fringes of the Great Smoky Mountains. Immediately within Blount County, the highway twists and turns, roughly following the natural topography of the mountains. This section is known as the "Tail of the Dragon" (or simply "The Dragon") due to its extremely sharp and tight curves, and roughly forms the boundary between the Great Smoky Mountains National Park to the east and the Cherokee National Forest to the west. The "Tail of the Dragon" is very popular with tourists and enthusiasts of motorcycles and sports cars. After several miles, the highway gradually straightens out, and starts running along the banks of the Little Tennessee River. Here the road becomes known as "Calderwood Highway". The highway then shifts into an east-west alignment and has an intersection with the western terminus of the Foothills Parkway before passing by Chilhowee Dam and going through the Tallassee community. US 129 then turns north and briefly enters Monroe County where it has an intersection with the eastern terminus of SR 72. It then reenters Blount County and passes through additional woodlands, before intersecting with SR 336 in the Lanier community.

US 129 continues northeast over the next several miles through a mix of farmland and residential neighborhoods to Clover Hill, where it becomes concurrent with US 411. The two routes proceed northeast as a five-lane undivided highway with a center turn lane to enter the city of Maryville. Passing initially through mostly residential areas, the highways have an intersection with the southern terminus of SR 335 (William Blount Drive). The two highways then pass through additional neighborhoods and a commercial area, before reaching a directional T interchange, where US 129 separates from US 411. Bypassing downtown Maryville on the west side, US 129 becomes a divided four-lane highway here known as US 129 Bypass as it passes by Foothills Mall and has intersections with US 321 (Lamar Alexander Boulevard), Foothills Mall Drive (unsigned SR 446), and Foch Street before crossing into the neighboring town of Alcoa. US 129 then has an interchange with Midsettlements Road and Bessemer Street before reaching an intersection with Louisville Road, which provides access to the neighboring town of Louisville. The highway then has an at-grade railroad crossing before coming to a directional-T interchange with SR 35 (N Hall Road), which also provides access to downtown Maryville.

=== Alcoa Highway ===
At the interchange with SR 35, US 129 becomes a divided highway currently in the process of being upgraded into a controlled-access highway. Initially known as Airport Highway the highway has an interchange first with a connector to SR 335 (Hunt Road) and then a connector to McGhee Tyson Airport. It then becomes known as Alcoa Highway, a name that it keeps all the way to its northern end. The highway then passes through a major business district before having an intersection with Airbase Road (SR 429) and coming to a cloverleaf interchange with the Pellissippi Parkway (I-140 westbound, SR 162 southbound). The stretch between the airport and Pellissippi Parkway is often considered dangerous and even deadly due to the amount of traffic and crashes on the highway. Alcoa Highway continues through suburban areas before having an intersection with SR 333 (Topside Road) before leaving Alcoa. It then crosses a bridge over the Little River to enter Knox County.

Immediately within the city limits of Knoxville, the route has an interchange with SR 168 (Governor John Sevier Highway) a short distance later east of the Fort Loudoun Lake impoundment of the Tennessee River. It then passes through a wooded area, crossing an impoundment of the lake, and then becomes a freeway once again. Expanding to six lanes, the highway gains frontage roads, which provide access to a dogbone interchange with Maloney Road, and partial interchange with Montlake Drive. The road then reduces to four lanes, passing adjacent to the east side of the river again, before reaching a trumpet interchange with Cherokee Trail and the road to the UT Knoxville Memorial Hospital, expanding back to six lanes and once again becoming a freeway. US 129 then crosses the Tennessee River on the James E. "Buck" Karnes Bridge. Immediately on the other side of the river, the highway has interchanges with US 11/US 70/SR 158 (Neyland Drive) and Kingston Pike, and runs along the western edge of The University of Tennessee. US 129 then crosses a series of railroads and surface streets on a long viaduct through industrial areas before coming reaching its northern terminus at an interchange with I-40.

== History ==
=== Early history ===
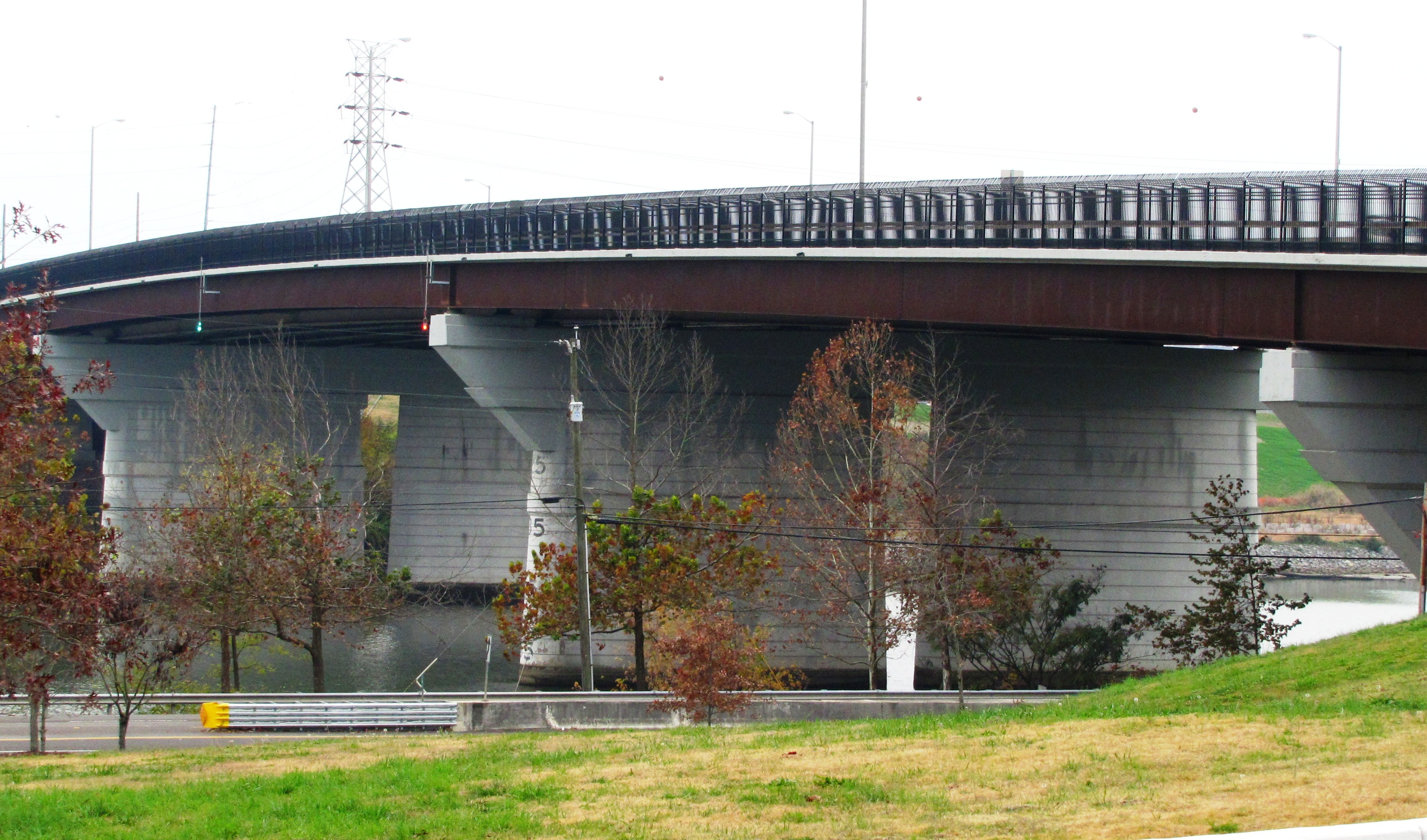
The J. E. "Buck" Karnes Bridge over the Tennessee River

In 1935, the American Association of State Highway Officials (AASHO) approved an extension of US 129 into Tennessee. The highway followed SR 72 from the state line to US 411 near Vonore. The route then remained concurrent with this route and SR 33 to Maryville, where US 411 split off, heading toward Sevierville. US 129 would then follow SR 33 to US 11/70 in Knoxville. This route crossed the Tennessee River on the Henley Street Bridge in Knoxville, which was joined by US 441 in 1951. By 1940, AASHTO approved rerouting US 129 onto SR 115 between Tallassee and Maryville. As part of the construction of Chilhowee Dam between 1955 and 1957, a new higher alignment was constructed between Tabcat Creek and the dam. Today, the old route is largely submerged, but is sometimes visible when the water level is low.

The Alcoa Highway portion of US 129 was first constructed and completed as a two-lane roadway from Knoxville to Blount County in 1939 to provide access to the then recently opened McGhee Tyson Airport. Initially, this route only carried the SR 115 designation, and in 1961, AASHO approved rerouting US 129 onto Alcoa Highway. They also rejected a request by Tennessee to renumber the old US 129 alignment along SR 33 to US 129 Alternate. US 129's bridge over the Tennessee River in Knoxville was completed in 1935, and was named after James Ernest Karnes (a.k.a. J. E. "Buck" Karnes), a Knoxville recipient of the Medal of Honor. On November 29, 1963, the final project to widen Alcoa Highway into a four-lane median-divided facility between I-40 and McGhee Tyson Airport was completed and dedicated by Tennessee Governor Frank G. Clement, U.S. Senator Herbert S. Walters, and Congressman Howard Baker. Several upgrades improving mobility were constructed on the Knoxville-Knox County section of Alcoa Highway, including replacements of at-grade intersections with interchanges at the University of Tennessee Medical Center (UTMC) and John Sevier Highway in the mid-1970s and mid-1980s respectively.

=== Alcoa Highway reconstruction ===
==== Background, planning, and early improvements ====
Increasing congestion on Alcoa Highway in Knoxville prompted pushes from residents to form a neighborhood group Make Alcoa a Safe Highway (MASH) in the early 1980s, seeking to address concerns of safety on the highway. The highway was reported to have a crash rate lower than the state average in 1982, but increasing traffic volumes began to render the roadway design inadequate, causing higher crash rates. Around this time, Alcoa Highway began to be nicknamed "I'll Kill Ya Highway". A 1985 study conducted by the Knoxville Metropolitan Planning Commission (MPC) analyzed potential improvements such as removing unnecessary median crossing, safety improvements to intersections, and widening to six lanes, although the latter was opposed by some planning officials. Others thought the then-proposed Pellissippi Parkway extension would alleviate the safety hazards on Alcoa Highway. In 1986, MASH issued a report with immediate request and short and long-term range plans, including widening and realigning the road, replacing intersections with interchanges, reconstructing existing interchanges, and implementing stricter zoning regulations along the highway. Several of the recommendations were established, including a parking ban on the right-of-way, speed limit enforcement, and highway lighting. In 1990, the city of Alcoa installed high-pressure sodium streetlights between Pistol Creek and the airport access interchange, including traditional fixtures and high-mast lighting at the SR 35 interchange.

In 1987, MASH commissioned the University of Tennessee to study potential improvements, which estimated that an upgrade to partial controlled access would cost $15.8 million, (Note: Equivalent to $38.4 million in 2025) and full-access control $40 million. (Note: Equivalent to $97.1 million in 2025) In July 1990, the MPC and MASH presented a draft report with three proposals for upgrading Alcoa Highway to a controlled access highway. These proposals included two-way frontage roads along much of the route between interchanges, improving existing interchanges, and widening to six lanes between Topside Road and the Tennessee River, with the costs for the three proposals estimated $51 million, (Note: Equivalent to $111 million in 2025) $82 million, (Note: Equivalent to $178 million in 2025) and $129 million, (Note: Equivalent to $281 million in 2025) respectively. Four months later, engineers at Wilbur Smith Associates recommended a plan for the Blount County portion that incorporated elements from the three proposals. This included one-way frontage roads between south of the airport and the Pellissippi Parkway. In July 1991, the Knoxville MPC reached a consensus for a redesign. This plan included the Wilbur Smith Associates plan for the Blount County portion, and a Knox County proposal developed by Mauldin Parnell Inc. The plan was approved by the MPC and local governments the following month, despite some objections from residents and business owners. TDOT reportedly took no action on these proposals, however. On October 18, 1993, the Blount County Commission passed a resolution asking TDOT to begin engineering studies for improvements to Alcoa Highway, but did not endorse any previous proposals. Seven days later, Tennessee Governor Ned McWherter said the state would fund an engineering study for Alcoa Highway if the local governments made it a priority, but also pointed out that Knoxville had other road project priority. On July 31, 1995, TDOT officials stated that improving Alcoa Highway was not a priority since it wasn't included in a road program passed by the Tennessee General Assembly in 1986.

The construction of the Pellissippi Parkway from Oak Ridge to Alcoa required construction of a cloverleaf interchange at US 129, which began construction in December 1989 and opened on December 4, 1992. Around the same time, the City of Knoxville installed lighting along the highway from the Little River north to the UTMC following annexation of the US 129 right-of-way and selected neighboring commercial and residential land uses. In February 1997, TDOT unveiled two proposals for improving Alcoa Highway, one of which included widening to six lanes, frontage roads, a combination of interchanges and right-in right-out intersections, and three traffic lights on the Knox County section in the second proposal. Several officials opposed the latter plan, and wanted the highway converted to a full freeway, as proposed in 1991. TDOT officials claimed the lights would improve access to commercial and residential areas and be safe, but this was disputed by engineers, who felt they would exacerbate congestion and rear-end crashes. Others suspected that owners of businesses along the highway had requested traffic signals, but TDOT officials denied this. On January 22, 1998, TDOT officials announced they had chosen a design that would widen 1.7 miles (2.7 km) between Maloney Road and Montlake Drive; construct interchanges at Maloney, Mount Vernon, and Ginn roads; and provide right-turn access from adjacent properties.

Improvements were made to the US 129 interchange at I-40 and the "Buck" Karnes bridge was replaced with a new six-lane structure by the early 2000s. By 2000, TDOT began property acquisitions for the planned expansions of Alcoa Highway between I-40 and the Little River. On February 27, 2013, the Federal Highway Administration (FHWA) approved an environmental assessment for the project between Pellissippi Parkway and the Tennessee River, and subsequently approved a finding of no significant impact (FONSI) on March 7, 2014. The massive project, consisting of seven phases, calls for the conversion of Alcoa Highway from a non-access-controlled highway into a full controlled-access highway (freeway). That year, the overall project was given an initial cost of more than $233 million, (Note: Equivalent to $312 million in 2025) but this rose to $446 million (Note: Equivalent to $586 million in 2025) within two years. By 2023, the final cost projection had exceeded $1 billion. (Note: Equivalent to $1.05 billion in 2025) The first phase of the project to begin was the 1.4-mile-long (2.3 km) Maloney Road to Woodson Drive phase in South Knoxville, with contract bidding opening in February 2016.

==== Construction ====
Construction work on the Maloney to Woodson phase of the Alcoa Highway improvement project began on June 24, 2016, with a groundbreaking ceremony. This project was slated for completion in November 2019, but experienced multiple delays, and was mostly complete by the fall of 2021, when new revisions for an access roadway to the Montlake Drive interchange were issued. Completion was later extended to winter 2022, but further delays ensued, and final work was not completed until the summer of 2023, resulting in the project taking twice as long as originally projected. The 1.5-mile (2.4 km) section between SR 35 and Tyson Boulevard began in February 2019, and was completed in the summer of 2022. The 2.25-mile (3.62 km) section between Topside Road and Maloney Road began in October 2019, and was completed in the spring of 2026, after the initial planned date of summer 2025. The next phase, 1.6 miles (2.6 km) between Woodson Drive and Cherokee Trail, was started on July 18, 2023, in a groundbreaking ceremony. This project was initially slated for completion in fall 2027, but in June 2026, TDOT announced that delays caused by geologic issues were part of the project's completion to spring 2030. Construction of the first phase of the relocated section, between Tyson Boulevard and South Singleton Station Road, began in August 2023. The Tyson Boulevard interchange is expected to be completed in the fall of 2027, and the rest of the project in June 2028.

== Junction list ==
County	Location	mi	km	Exit	Destinations	Notes
Blount		0.0	0.0		US 129 south – Robbinsville	Continuation from North Carolina through Deals Gap; south end of SR 115 overlap
Blount	Chilhowee	14.3	23.0		Foothills Parkway	Southern terminus of Foothills Parkway
Monroe	Pumpkin Center	21.4	34.4		SR 72 west – Vonore	Eastern terminus of SR 72
Blount	Lanier	25.0	40.2		SR 336 (Six Mile Road / Brick Mill Road) – Greenback	
Blount	Clover Hill	32.0	51.5		US 411 south (SR 33 south) – Vonore	South end of US 411/SR 33 overlap
Blount	Maryville	33.8	54.4		SR 335 north (William Blount Drive)	Southern terminus of SR 335
Blount	Maryville	36.3	58.4		US 411 north (Broadway Avenue/SR 33 north)	North end of US 411/SR 33 concurrency; Interchange; northbound to northbound, southbound to southbound, and southbound US 411/SR 33 to northbound US 129; access from southbound US 129 to northbound US 411/SR 33 via U-turn at Cooper Street
Blount	Maryville	36.8	59.2		Mall Road	Southbound right-in/right-out ramps
Blount	Maryville	37.2	59.9		US 321 (Lamar Alexander Parkway/SR 73) – Friendsville, Lenoir City, Walland, Townsend	Provides access to the Great Smoky Mountains National Park
Blount	Maryville	37.8	60.8		SR 446 west (Foothills Mall Drive)	SR 446 is unsigned; eastern terminus of SR 446
Blount	Alcoa	38.2	61.5		West Bessemer Street / Middlesettlements Road	Diverging diamond interchange
Blount	Alcoa	40.0	64.4		SR 35 north (Hall Road) – Alcoa	Interchange; southern terminus of SR 35; northbound to northbound, southbound to southbound, and northbound US 129 to southbound SR 35; Access from northbound SR 35 to southbound US 129 via U-turn on northbound US 129 at milepost 40.2
Blount	Alcoa	40.7	65.5		Tesla Boulevard TO SR 335 (Hunt Road)	Interchange
Blount	Alcoa			15	McGhee Tyson Airport Passenger Terminal	Future interchange
Blount	Alcoa			17	Wright Road	Future interchange
Blount	Alcoa			18	SR 162 east (Pellissppi Parkway) – Oak Ridge, Eagleton Village	Current cloverleaf interchange; stack interchange under construction
Blount	Alcoa			19	Frontage Rd	Future interchange
Blount	Alcoa	45.8	73.7		SR 333 south (Topside Road) – Louisville	Northern terminus of SR 333
Knox	Knoxville	47.0	75.6	1	SR 168 east (Governor John Sevier Highway)	Western terminus of SR 168; Trumpet interchange
Knox	Knoxville			2	Maloney Road	Northbound exit and southbound entrance
Knox	Knoxville			3	Montlake Drive	No southbound entrance
Knox	Knoxville	50.8	81.8		Cherokee Trail – UT Medical Center	Trumpet interchange; south end of freeway
Knox	Knoxville	51.2– 51.5	82.4– 82.9		UT Cherokee Farm campus site / UTMC	Northbound, one right-in/right-out driveway, one entrance ramp; southbound, two right-in/right-out driveways
Knox	Knoxville	51.5	82.9	J. E. "Buck" Karnes Bridge over the Tennessee River		
Knox	Knoxville	51.8	83.4		US 11 / US 70 (Neyland Drive/SR 1/SR 158) – University of Tennessee	Interchange; no access to southbound US 129
Knox	Knoxville	51.9	83.5		Kingston Pike	Interchange
Knox	Knoxville	52.8	85.0		I-40 – Nashville, Chattanooga, Lexington, Asheville; SR 62 (Western Avenue / 17th Street)	Northern terminus of US 129 and SR 115; Semi-directional T interchange; I-40 exit 386B; Ramp to SR 62 splits from ramp to I-40 east, providing access via Dale Avenue NW; access from SR 169 (Middlebrook Pike) / University Avenue to southbound US 129 is provided by a ramp at the intersection of Ailor Avenue and North 21st Street, which merges with the Exit 386B ramp from I-40 west
1.000 mi = 1.609 km; 1.000 km = 0.621 mi: Concurrency terminus; Proposed; Incomplete access

== State Route 115 ==
State Route 115
- Location: Knoxville–NC state line
- Length: 52.8 mi (85.0 km)

State Route 115 (SR 115) is the hidden state route that overlaps the entire route of US 129 in the state of Tennessee. The highway is 52.8 miles (85 km) long and is located entirely in East Tennessee. It begins in Blount County and ends in Knox County. It is completely unsigned, with the exception of mileposts, with the highway being solely signed as US 129.

== See also ==
- Great Smoky Mountains National Park
- Interstate 3
- Little Tennessee River
- Tail of the Dragon
- Tennessee River

U.S. Route 129
Previous state: North Carolina	Tennessee	Next state: Terminus
