= Tennessee State Route 95 =

State highway in Tennessee, United States

State Route 95
- SR 95; primary in red, secondary in blue, unsigned in green

Route information
- Maintained by TDOT
- Length: 42.3 mi (68.1 km)

Major junctions
- South end: US 411 in Greenback
- US 321 near Glendale; US 11 in Lenoir City; I-75 in Lenoir City; US 70 in Lenoir City; I-40 in Lenoir City
- North end: SR 61 near Oak Ridge

Location
- Country: United States
- State: Tennessee
- Counties: Loudon, Roane, Anderson

Highway system
- Tennessee State Routes; Interstate; US; State
← SR 94	→ SR 96

State Route 95 (SR 95) is a state route in the U.S. state of Tennessee. It serves to connect Lenoir City with Greenback and Oak Ridge, via U.S. Route 321.

== Route description ==
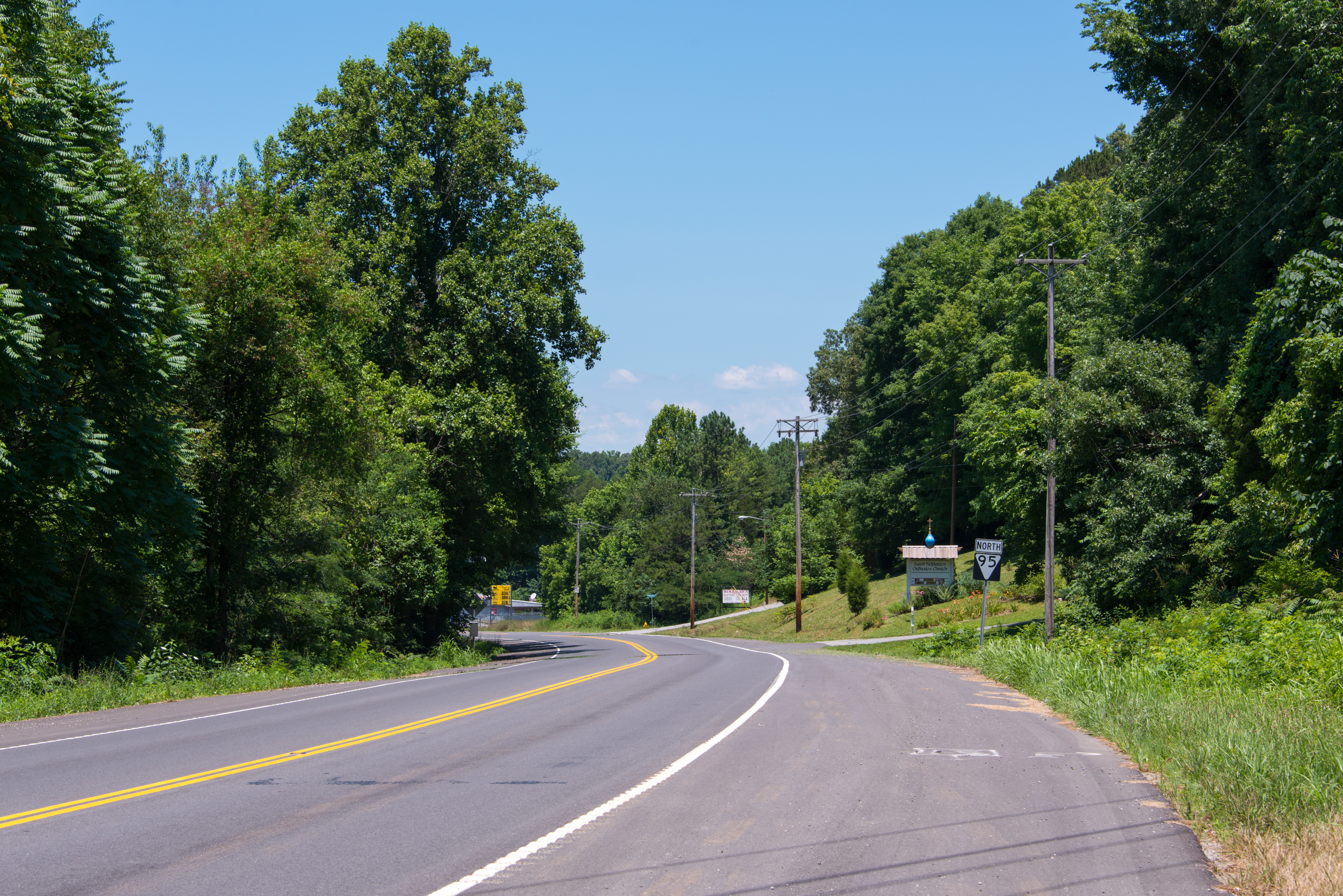
SR 95 north of I-40

SR 95 serves as a secondary route between its southern terminus in Greenback and I-40 and as a primary highway for the rest of its duration.

SR 95 begins at US 411 (SR 33), in Greenback, and goes northwest predominantly along Lenoir City Road. Curving through the Red Knobs, it passes through the communities of Centersville and Glendale, before reaching US 321 (SR 73). This section of SR 95 is two-lane throughout, with no shoulders and minimum allowable lane widths. The next 12.8 miles (20.6 km), SR 95 is a hidden overlap of US 321, as it traverses through Lenoir City, intersecting US 11 (SR 2), I-75, and then US 70 (SR 1) in that city.

At the I-40 interchange, US 321 (SR 73) ends and SR 95 reemerges to continue the route towards Oak Ridge. Crossing the Clinch River, via the Charles Vanden Bulck Bridge, SR 95 enters Roane County and land controlled by the Department of Energy/Oak Ridge National Laboratory. The highway curves along the various ridges, most access roads are controlled or blocked off. As SR 95 approaches SR 58, the highway widens to four-lane before the interchange. After the interchange, it continues north along Oak Ridge Turnpike as a four-lane divided highway. It exits the Department of Energy's boundary near the Roane/Anderson county line, soon after neighborhoods begins to appear just off the road and bike lanes are along the shoulders.

In Anderson County, SR 95 serves as the main highway through Oak Ridge, with commercial businesses along its shoulders and neighborhoods connected by access roads. At the center of Oak Ridge, SR 95 connects with SR 62 (Illinois Avenue), which continues to Oliver Springs and Knoxville. Northeast of Oak Ridge, towards Clinton, SR 95 ends at the intersection of SR 61 (Oliver Springs Highway).

== Junction list ==
County	Location	mi	km	Destinations	Notes
Loudon	Greenback	0.0	0.0	US 411 (SR 33/Greenback Road) – Madisonville, Maryville	Southern terminus; SR 95 begins as a secondary highway
Loudon		9.9	15.9	US 321 north (W. Lamar Alexander Parkway/SR 73) – Friendsville, Maryville	South end of unsigned US 321/SR 73 overlap
Loudon		13.6	21.9	SR 444 west (Tellico Parkway) – Tellico Village	Eastern terminus of SR 444; interchange
Loudon		14.2	22.9	Bridge over the Tennessee River	
Loudon	Lenoir City	15.4	24.8	US 11 (Broadway Street/SR 2) – Knoxville, Loudon, Farragut	
Loudon	Lenoir City	18.0	29.0	I-75 – Knoxville, Chattanooga	I-75 exit 81
Loudon	Lenoir City	18.9	30.4	US 70 (Kingston Pike/SR 1) – Knoxville, Kingston	
Loudon	Lenoir City	22.7	36.5	I-40 – Knoxville, Nashville US 321 ends	I-40 exit 364; South end of unsigned US 321/SR 73 overlap; northern terminus of US 321/SR 73; SR 95 becomes a signed primary highway
Clinch River		23.6	38.0	Charles Vanden Bulck Bridge over the Clinch River	
Roane	Oak Ridge	29.4	47.3	SR 58 south (Oak Ridge Turnpike) – Kingston	Interchange; northern terminus of SR 58
Anderson	Oak Ridge	36.8	59.2	SR 62 (Illinois Avenue) – Oliver Springs, Knoxville	
Anderson		42.3	68.1	SR 61 (Oliver Springs Highway) – Oliver Springs, Clinton	Northern terminus
1.000 mi = 1.609 km; 1.000 km = 0.621 mi
