= Tennessee State Route 168 =

State highway in Tennessee, United States

State Route 168
- Governor John Sevier Highway
- SR 168 highlighted in red

Route information
- Maintained by TDOT
- Length: 18.1 mi (29.1 km)

Major junctions
- West end: US 129 south of Knoxville
- US 441 in South Knoxville; I-40 / US 25W in Knoxville
- East end: US 11 / US 11E / US 11W / US 70 in Knoxville

Location
- Country: United States
- State: Tennessee
- Counties: Knox

Highway system
- Tennessee State Routes; Interstate; US; State
← SR 167	→ SR 169

State Route 168 (SR 168, known as Governor John Sevier Highway) is a state highway in Knox County, Tennessee, that is 18.1 miles (29.1 km) long. Its western terminus is with US 129/SR 115, and its eastern terminus is with US 11/US 11E/US 11W/US 70/SR 1.

== Route description ==
SR 168 begins as a 2-lane highway at an interchange with US 129/SR 115 (Alcoa Highway) south of Knoxville. It goes east to have an interchange with SR 33 (Maryville Pike) before passing through rural areas. SR 168 passes by the home of former Governor of Tennessee John Sevier, for which this highway is named after, before entering South Knoxville area of Knoxville to have an interchange with US 441/SR 71 (Chapman Highway). SR 168 takes a more northerly route and passes through New Hopewell before crossing a bridge over the French Broad River to re enter Knoxville and pass through an industrial area. The highway then has an intersection with Strawberry Plains Pike, which leads to an interchange with I-40 (Exit 398), before following the banks of the Holston River to pass underneath I-40 without an interchange. SR 168 then comes to an intersection and becomes concurrent with US 11E/US 25W/US 70/SR 9 and turns west. From here on, SR 168 is unsigned companion route for US 11E and US 70. They immediately cross a bridge over the Holston River as a 4-lane divided highway known as Asheville Highway, and continues west through neighborhoods and has an interchange with I-40 (Exit 394), where US 25W/SR 9 splits off and goes north along I-40 west. US 11E/US 70/SR 168 continues west through neighborhoods and passing through a business district before US 11E and SR 168 both come to an end at an interchange with US 11/SR 1 (Magnolia Avenue) and the southern end of US 11W (Rutledge Pike), where US 70 continues west along US 11/SR 1.

Except for the concurrency with US 11E and US 70, the entire route of SR 168 is known as Governor John Sevier Highway, in honor of the former state Governor John Sevier, who was the first governor of Tennessee.

== History ==
In 1977, design proposals for a partial cloverleaf interchange at John Sevier Highway at I-40 intent to relieve truck traffic from the Forks of the River industrial park were cancelled following neighborhood opposition, citing the removal of a 24-family neighborhood near Strawberry Plains.

== Junction list ==
The entire route is in Knox County.

Location	mi	km	Destinations	Notes
Knoxville	0.0	0.0	US 129 (Alcoa Highway/SR 115) – Knoxville, Alcoa, Maryville, McGhee Tyson Airport	Western terminus; Trumpet interchange
South Knoxville			SR 33 (Maryville Pike) – Maryville, Eagleton Village, Rockford, Knoxville	Two-quadrant interchange
South Knoxville			US 441 (Chapman Highway/SR 71) – Seymour, Sevierville, Knoxville	Interchange
			Strawberry Plains Pike TO I-40 – Strawberry Plains	
Knoxville			US 11E north / US 25W south / US 70 east (Asheville Highway/SR 9 south) – Strawberry Plains, Dandridge, New Market, Jefferson City	Eastern end of US 11E/US 25W/US 70/SR 9 concurrency
Knoxville			I-40 / US 25W north (SR 9 north) – Nashville, Newport	Western end of US 25W/SR 9 concurrency; I-40 exit 394
Knoxville	18.1	29.1	US 11W north (Rutledge Pike/SR 1 east) / US 11 south / US 70 west (Magnolia Avenue/SR 1 west) – Rutledge	Southern terminus of US 11W; Southern terminus of US 11E; Eastern terminus of SR 168; Interchange
1.000 mi = 1.609 km; 1.000 km = 0.621 mi: Concurrency terminus

== See also ==
- List of Tennessee state highways
