= U.S. Route 321 =

Highway in the United States

U.S. Route 321
- US 321 highlighted in red

Route information
- Auxiliary route of US 21
- Length: 516.9 mi (831.9 km)
- Existed: 1931–present
- Tourist routes: Western York Scenic Byway

Major junctions
- South end: US 17 in Hardeeville, SC
- I-26 in Cayce, SC; I-20 in Columbia, SC; I-85 in Gastonia, NC; I-40 in Hickory, NC; I-26 / US 19W / US 23 in Johnson City, TN; I-40 in Newport, TN; I-75 in Lenoir City, TN
- North end: I-40 / SR 73 / SR 95 near Lenoir City, TN

Location
- Country: United States
- States: South Carolina, North Carolina, Tennessee
- Counties: SC: Jasper, Hampton, Allendale, Bamberg, Orangeburg, Lexington, Richland, Fairfield, Chester, York; NC: Gaston, Lincoln, Catawba, Burke, Caldwell, Watauga, Avery; TN: Johnson, Carter, Washington, Greene, Cocke, Sevier, Blount, Loudon

Highway system
- United States Numbered Highway System; List; Special; Divided
← SC 319	SC	→ SC 322
← US 311	NC	→ NC 343
← SR 320	TN	→ SR 321

U.S. Route 321 (US 321) is a spur of U.S. Route 21. It runs for 516.9 miles (831.9 km) from Hardeeville, South Carolina to Lenoir City, Tennessee; with both serving as southern termini. It reaches its northernmost point at Elizabethton, Tennessee, just northeast of Johnson City. Because of its unusual "north–south–north" routing, U.S. Route 321 intersects both Interstate 40 and U.S. Route 70 three separate times. The highway serves different roles in each state: An alternate route to interstates in South Carolina, a major highway in North Carolina, and a scenic route in Tennessee.

== Route description ==
Lengths
	mi	km
SC	217.2	349.5
NC	105.5	169.8
TN	194.2	312.5
Total	516.9	831.8

=== South Carolina ===
US 321 provides direct access between Savannah and Columbia, serving as an alternate to Interstate 95 and Interstate 26. Starting in Hardeeville, US 321 as a mostly 2 lane highway goes through sparsely populated areas and small towns including Estill, Fairfax, and Denmark, heading in a rather straight and northward direction into the Columbia area, widening to a 5 lane highway right after Neeses, then narrowing down to a 2 lane highway right after the town of North and widening to a 5 lane highway again after Swansea and staying that way until it merges with its parent route US 21 in Dixiana. In Columbia, the route stays concurrent with US 21 through Cayce, over the Congaree River on the Blossom Street Bridge, turning left onto Huger Street, right onto Elmwood Avenue, and left onto North Main Street. The roads separate at Hyatt Park, with US 321 staying west of I-77 and US 21 north of Columbia. The route goes through to communities of Winnsboro, Chester, York, and Clover before entering North Carolina at Bowling Green.

=== North Carolina ===
US 321 northbound past I-85 in Gastonia, North Carolina

US 321 is an important route in Western North Carolina. It provides an alternative north–south route to I-77, which passes through a busy metropolitan area, and US 221, which is more twisty drive up the Appalachians. Travelers from South Carolina who are going to points west of Charlotte and want to avoid the traffic of I-77 may choose to enter the state on US 321.

The highway traverses through seven counties: Gaston, Lincoln, Catawba, Burke, Caldwell, Watauga, and Avery. US 321 has six control cities: Gastonia, Lincolnton, Hickory, Lenoir, Blowing Rock, and Boone.

US 321 is a multilane highway beginning at the state line. After 7 miles (11 km), it enters the Gastonia area. Traffic on northbound 321 through Gastonia is generally not as heavy as traffic on southbound 321 north of I-85, where it may back up for a couple of miles as drivers wait to turn onto I-85. The state completed a new interchange with I-85 in 2021 which has southbound 321 cross over 321NB at a stoplight just north of I-85. The traffic now enters I-85 northbound with a flyunder entrance ramp over a former railroad right-of-way.

The road becomes a freeway at C. Grier Beam Boulevard in Gastonia, just south of NC 275/NC 279. It remains a freeway until just north of its junction with US 70 in Hickory. The freeway bypasses a number of cities that the old US 321 route once passed through. Today, US 321 Business follows the original 38-mile (61 km) route, which serves Maiden, Newton, and Conover, but the freeway is a more direct route to the mountains, and the business route is generally used by local traffic only.

Traffic is usually heavy between Hickory and Lenoir. The North Carolina Department of Transportation (NCDOT) has a long-term plan to widen the road to six lanes, which is expected to begin after 2020.

North of Lenoir, US 321 is a four-lane divided highway, continuing up the steep escarpment of the Blue Ridge Mountains. Until early 2018, the road was a narrow two-lane highway from near Patterson through Blowing Rock. Work on this area continued for much of the first two decades of the 21st century. The widening of US 321 through Blowing Rock was and continues to be seen as a controversial project. Many residents of the town felt that a four-lane highway would destroy the character of the small town, and they proposed several bypass alternatives. NCDOT selected the widening as its preferred alternative, but added several features such as underground utilities, sidewalks, landscaping, and rock walls to make the widening more palatable to the residents opposed to it. These features were not present on the two-lane highway that was replaced. The final portion of the widening project, at the steepest part of the road just south of Blowing Rock, began in 2012 and was completed in 2018. Some landscaping work remains which will commence in Fall 2018 as its own project, constructed separately for beautification of the route through town.

US 321 northbound past US 321 Bus. in Blowing Rock, North Carolina

North of Blowing Rock, US 321 is already a highway of four lanes up to King Street in Boone; thus, US 321 is a four-lane highway from the South Carolina state line to downtown Boone. Currently, US 321 meets US 421 at King Street and overlaps it over King Street to leave town to the west. NCDOT project R-2615 is proposed to widen the US 321/421 concurrency from this junction to their junction near Vilas, although this project is currently unfunded. There is a feasibility study (FS-0511A) in progress to examine the possibility of widening US 321 from the junction near Vilas to the Tennessee state line. If both of these projects were completed, then US 321 would be a four-lane highway through the entire state.

=== Tennessee ===
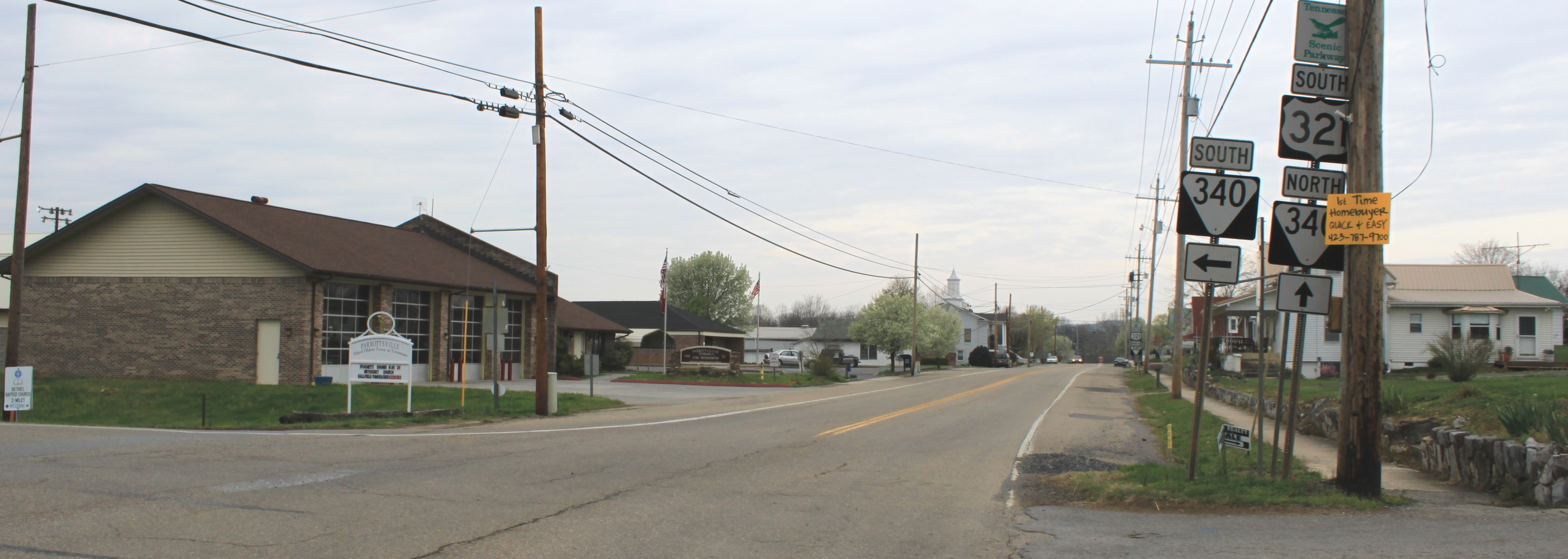
Former portion of US 321 in Parrottsville, Tennessee, facing south before it was rerouted.

As it crosses into Tennessee, US 321 enters the Cherokee National Forest, and continues westward through the rugged valley between Pond Mountain on the south and Watauga Lake on the north. The highway passes numerous campgrounds, boat launches, and other lake-related recreational areas as it winds its way along the shores of the lake. South of Butler, the highway joins SR 67, which enters from the Mountain City area to the northeast. The Appalachian Trail crosses US 321 at its intersection with Shook Gap Road, just before the highway exits the national forest. At Hampton, US 321 intersects US 19E, and the two highways run concurrently northward into Elizabethton.

US 321 inverts directions in Elizabethton: the road is designated as southbound in both directions driving away from its intersection with US 19E. It is conterminous with US 11E through portions of Washington and Greene counties. In Greeneville, the highway continues south into Cocke County. At the Cocke-Greene County line US 321 becomes a four-laned divided highway and bypasses Parrottsville. The four-lane section ends just before US 321's junction with SR 160 and crossing I-40 at Newport.

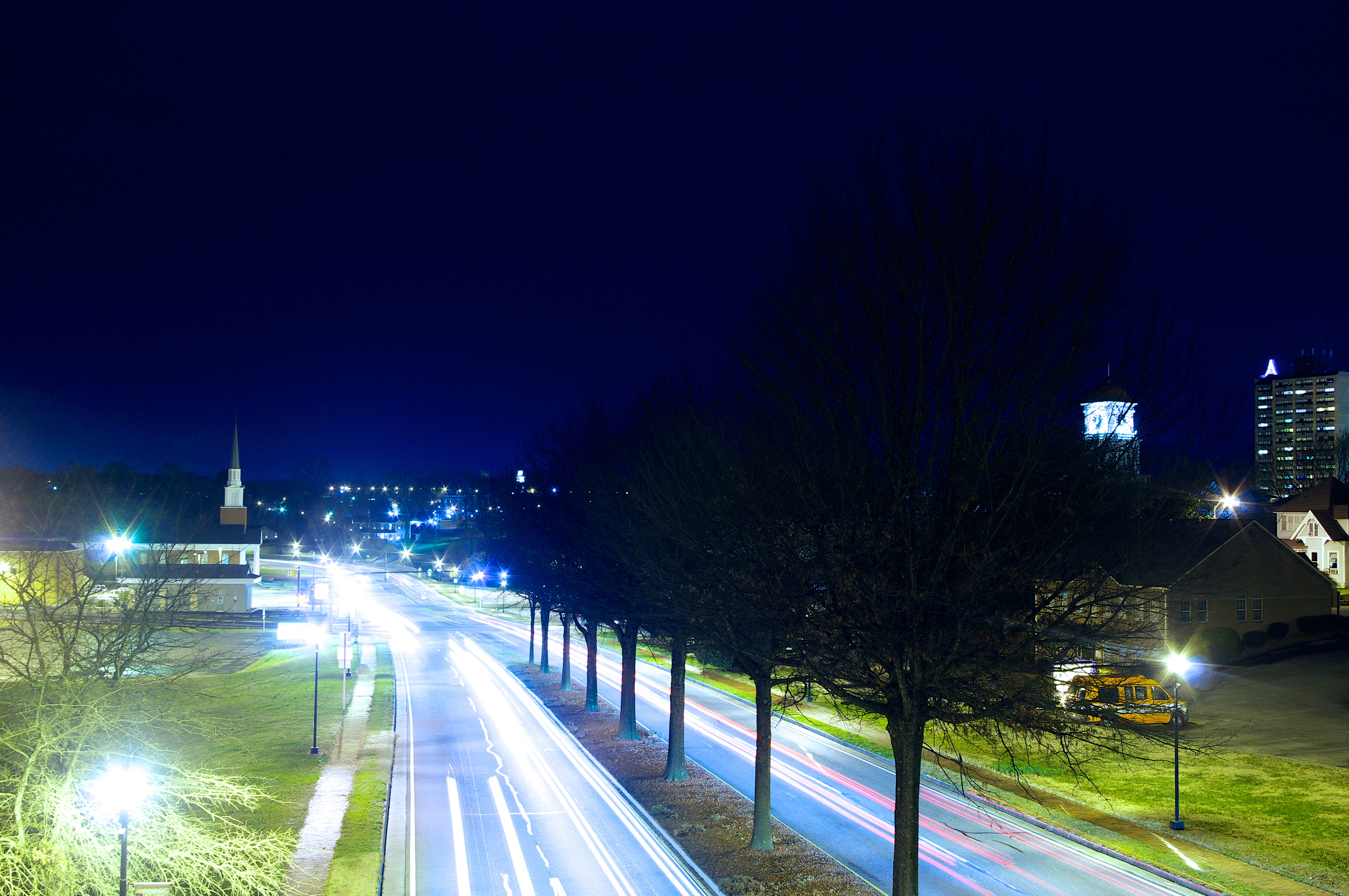
US 321 (Lamar Alexander Parkway) in Maryville

The stretch of US 321 from Newport south to Cosby and southwest through Pittman Center to Gatlinburg parallels the northern boundary of the Great Smoky Mountains National Park and is quite scenic. From a point between Newport and Cosby to the intersection with the Little River Road, it is concurrent with SR 73. In Pigeon Forge, concurrent with US 441/Great Smoky Mountains Parkway, US 321 is a divided, multi-lane traffic-laden thoroughfare where it serves as the city's main route, lined with hotels, outlet malls and amusement facilities. Veering southwest of Pigeon Forge, the highway takes on a more rural character as it traverses Wears Valley, and narrows down to two lanes until its junction with SR 73 Scenic (the Little River Road) at the Townsend entrance to the park. It is concurrent with SR 73 from this junction to its terminus. With the exception of a 3-mile (4.8 km) section between Townsend and Maryville, the remaining portions of the highway through Blount County are a minimum of four lanes and usually a divided highway. Once the highway reaches Fort Loudon Dam in Loudon County, it crosses the Tennessee River via a bridge, completed in 2017, southeast of the dam then intersects with US 11 in Lenoir City. US 321 has a wrong-way concurrency with SR 95 from a point several miles south of Lenoir City (near Greenback) to its terminus at I-40. In the northern part of Lenoir City, US 321 intersects I-75 and US 70 before reaching I-40. Beyond I-40, the road continues northward to Oak Ridge as the two-lane SR 95.

US 321 is a four-lane semi-divided thoroughfare from I-40 and I-75 to the Great Smoky Mountains National Park, except for the 3-mile (4.8 km) stretch near Walland.

== History ==
=== North Carolina Highway 17 ===
North Carolina Highway 17
- Location: Propst Crossroads–Boone, NC
- Length: 55.9 mi (90.0 km)
- Existed: 1921–1934

North Carolina Highway 17 (NC 17) was an original state highway that traversed from Hickory to Boone, through Granite Falls, Hudson, Lenoir and Blowing Rock. In 1930, it was extended south on new primary routing to NC 113, in Propst Crossroads; also same year, US 321 was established in the state and overlapped NC 17 between Hickory and Boone. In 1934, NC 17 was decommissioned, with US 321 taking all north of Hickory and NC 96 taking all south.

=== North Carolina Highway 155 ===
North Carolina Highway 155
- Location: Dallas–Conover, NC
- Length: 29.4 mi (47.3 km)
- Existed: 1994–1999

North Carolina Highway 155 (NC 155) was established in 1994 following the old alignment of US 321 as it was moved onto new four-lane controlled-access highway. From NC 275/NC 279, in Dallas, it traversed north through High Shoals to Lincolnton. Sharing a short concurrency with NC 150 as it bypass the downtown area of Lincolnton, it continues north meeting with main US 321, south of Maiden, continuing in concurrency through Newton and finally Conover, where it ended at US 70. In 1999, the remainder of US 321 was moved onto new freeway bypass west of Newton and Conover; at same time, NC 155 was decommissioned and absorbed into US 321 Business.

=== North Carolina Highway 603 ===
North Carolina Highway 603
- Location: TN State Line–Sugar Grove, NC
- Existed: 1931–1961

North Carolina Highway 603 (NC 603) was established in 1931. It was decommissioned in 1963.

== Future ==
In addition to the widening project, there have also been talks of a freeway-to-freeway connection with Interstate 85 in Gastonia that would greatly relieve traffic flowing through the junction. Currently, US 321 is a surface road at the I-85 interchange, and is a limited access freeway a few hundred yards north. To extend the freeway to I-85, the remaining at-grade intersections and traffic lights would have to be eliminated.

== Major intersections ==
State	County	Location	mi	km	Destinations	Notes
South Carolina	Jasper	Hardeeville	0.0	0.0	US 17 (Whyte Hardee Boulevard) – Ridgeland, Savannah	
South Carolina	Jasper	Hardeeville	0.5	0.80	SC 46 east (Church Road)	To Millstone Landing
South Carolina	Jasper	Tillman	12.5	20.1	SC 336 east (Tillman Road) – Ridgeland	
South Carolina	Jasper	Tarboro	19.8	31.9	US 601 north (Cypress Branch Road) – Hampton	Southern terminus of US 601
South Carolina	Jasper	Robertville	22.6	36.4	SC 462 (Gillson Branch Road) – Pineland	
South Carolina	Hampton	Garnett	25.6	41.2	SC 119 south (Clyo Road) – Clyo, Springfield	
South Carolina	Hampton	Scotia	30.7	49.4	SC 333 (Scotia-Furman Highway) – Furman	
South Carolina	Hampton	Estill	35.8	57.6	SC 3 south (Third Street) – Lena	South end of SC 3 overlap
South Carolina	Hampton	Estill	36.0	57.9	SC 3 north (Nixville Road) – Barnwell	North end of SC 3 overlap
South Carolina	Hampton		40.4	65.0	SC 363 east (Luray Highway) – Hampton	To Lake Warren State Park
South Carolina	Allendale	Fairfax	49.9	80.3	US 278 (Allendale-Hampton Highway) – Allendale, Hampton	
South Carolina	Allendale	Sycamore	55.6	89.5	SC 641 (Confederate Highway) – Allendale	
South Carolina	Allendale	Ulmer	59.9	96.4	US 301 south (Burton's Ferry Highway) – Allendale	South end of US 301 overlap
South Carolina	Bamberg		61.9	99.6	US 301 north (Main Highway) – Bamberg	North end of US 301 overlap
South Carolina	Bamberg	Olar	66.5	107.0	SC 64 (Low Country Road) – Barnwell	
South Carolina	Bamberg	Denmark	76.6	123.3	SC 70 south (Hagood Street) – Barnwell	South end of SC 70 overlap
South Carolina	Bamberg		76.9	123.8	US 78 (Heritage Highway) – Bamberg, Blackville	
South Carolina	Bamberg		77.3	124.4	SC 70 north (Country Club Road) – Orangeburg	North end of SC 70 overlap
South Carolina	Orangeburg	Norway	85.3	137.3	SC 332 east (Cope Road) – Cope	East end of SC 332 overlap
South Carolina	Orangeburg	Norway	85.6	137.8	SC 332 west / SC 400 east (Norway Road) – Springfield, Orangeburg	West end of SC 332 overlap
South Carolina	Orangeburg	Neeses	90.9	146.3	SC 4 (Neeses Highway) – Springfield, Orangeburg	
South Carolina	Orangeburg	Neeses	91.4	147.1	SC 389 west (Ninety Six Road) – Perry, Wagener	
South Carolina	Orangeburg	North	97.3	156.6	US 178 (North Highway) – Pelion, Orangeburg	
South Carolina	Lexington	Swansea	105.1	169.1	SC 3 south (Whetstone Road) – Springfield, Blackville, Barnwell	
South Carolina	Lexington	Swansea	105.9	170.4	SC 692 south (Fifth Street) – Orangeburg	To Swansea High Football Stadium
South Carolina	Lexington	Swansea	106.1	170.8	SC 6 west (Second Street) – Lexington	West end of SC 6 overlap
South Carolina	Lexington	Swansea	106.2	170.9	SC 6 east (First Street) – St. Matthews	East end of SC 6 overlap
South Carolina	Lexington		117.7	189.4	US 21 south / US 176 east (Charleston Highway) – Orangeburg	South end of US 21 and east end of US 176 overlap
South Carolina	Lexington	Cayce	120.2	193.4	To I-77 north / Fish Hatchery Road – Charlotte	
South Carolina	Lexington	Cayce	120.6	194.1	I-26 – Charleston, Spartanburg	
South Carolina	Lexington	Cayce	121.8	196.0	SC 2 north (Frink Road)	
South Carolina	Lexington	West Columbia	123.3	198.4	SC 302 south (Airport Boulevard) – Aiken, Columbia Metropolitan Airport	
South Carolina	Lexington	West Columbia	125.0	201.2	SC 2 (State Street)	
South Carolina	Richland	Columbia			SC 48 Truck east (Blossom Street east / US 21 Conn. east / US 76 Conn. east)	Western terminus of US 21 Conn., the western segment of US 76 Conn., SC 48 Truck, and Blossom Street; US 21, US 176, and US 321 turn left off of Blossom Street onto Huger Street.
South Carolina	Richland	Columbia	126.5	203.6	US 1 / US 378 (Gervais Street)	To South Carolina State House
South Carolina	Richland	Columbia	126.8	204.1	SC 12 (Hampton/Tylor Streets)	To Finlay Park and Columbia Museum of Art
South Carolina	Richland	Columbia	127.4	205.0	I-126 west / US 76 west – Greenville, Spartanburg	West end of US 76 overlap
South Carolina	Richland	Columbia	128.0	206.0	US 76 east (Elmwood Avenue)	East end of US 76 overlap
South Carolina	Richland	Columbia	128.6	207.0	US 176 west (River Drive)	West end of US 176 overlap
South Carolina	Richland	Columbia	129.2	207.9	SC 16 (Sunset Drive)	
South Carolina	Richland	Columbia	129.8	208.9	SC 215 north (Montichello Road)	To Columbia International University
South Carolina	Richland	Columbia	130.8	210.5	US 21 north (Main Street)	North end of US 21 overlap; Columbia College at intersection
South Carolina	Richland	Columbia	132.2	212.8	I-20 – Florence, Augusta	
South Carolina	Fairfield		151.2	243.3	SC 269 south (Hinnants Store Road)	
South Carolina	Fairfield	Winnsboro Mills	152.4	245.3	SC 34 east – Ridgeway	East end of SC 34 overlap; to South Carolina Railroad Museum
South Carolina	Fairfield	Winnsboro Mills	152.7	245.7	US 321 Bus. north (Columbia Road) / SC 213 west (Monjicono Road) – Monticello	
South Carolina	Fairfield	Winnsboro	156.1	251.2	SC 34 west (Newberry Road) / SC 200 east – Newberry, Great Falls	West end of SC 34 overlap
South Carolina	Fairfield	Winnsboro	156.9	252.5	US 321 Bus. south (Congress Street)	
South Carolina	Chester	Chester	178.8	287.8	SC 97 south (Great Falls Road) – Great Falls, Camden	South end of SC 97 overlap
South Carolina	Chester	Chester	179.4	288.7	US 321 Bus. north (Columbia Road) SC 9 south / SC 72 east / SC 97 north / SC 121 north (J.A. Cochran Bypass)	South end of SC 9, east end of SC 72, and north end of SC 97/SC 121 overlap
South Carolina	Chester	Chester	181.2	291.6	SC 72 west / SC 121 south (West End Road) – Carlisle, Whitmire	West end of SC 72 and south end of SC 121 overlap
South Carolina	Chester	Chester	182.0	292.9	SC 9 Bus. south (Pinckney Street)	
South Carolina	Chester	Chester	182.3	293.4	SC 9 north (Pinckney Street) – Lockhart	North end of SC 9 overlap
South Carolina	Chester	Chester	184.2	296.4	US 321 Bus. south / SC 97 (Center Road) – Hickory Grove	
South Carolina	Chester	Lowrys	189.7	305.3	SC 909 south (Old York Road) – Lewis	
South Carolina	York	McConnells	194.2	312.5	SC 322 west (Church Street)	West end of SC 322 overlap
South Carolina	York	McConnells	194.3	312.7	SC 322 east (McConnells Highway) – Rock Hill	West end of SC 322 overlap; to Historic Brattonsville
South Carolina	York	York	203.3	327.2	US 321 Bus. (Congress Street)	
South Carolina	York	York	203.7	327.8	SC 49 (Sharon Road) – Sharon, Union	
South Carolina	York	York	204.5	329.1	SC 5 Bus. / SC 161 Bus. south (Liberty Street) – Blacksburg	South end of SC 161 Bus overlap
South Carolina	York	York	205.7	331.0	US 321 Bus. (Kings Mountain Street)	
South Carolina	York	York	205.9	331.4	SC 5 / SC 161 south (Alexander Love Highway) – Blacksburg	South end of SC 161 and north end of SC 161 Bus overlap
South Carolina	York	Filbert	207.5	333.9	SC 161 north – Bethany	North end of SC 161 overlap
South Carolina	York	Clover	213.4	343.4	SC 55 (Kings Mountain/Bethel Streets) – Lake Wylie, Blacksburg	
			217.2 0.0	349.5 0.0	South Carolina–North Carolina state line	
North Carolina	Gaston	Gastonia	7.3	11.7	Garrison Boulevard	
North Carolina	Gaston	Gastonia	7.9	12.7	US 29 / US 74 (Franklin Boulevard)	
North Carolina	Gaston	Gastonia	8.1	13.0	NC 7 east (Long Avenue)	
North Carolina	Gaston	Gastonia	9.4	15.1	I-85 – Charlotte, Spartanburg	
North Carolina	Gaston	Dallas	9.4	15.1	Grier Beem Boulevard – Gaston College	Signed exit 11
North Carolina	Gaston	Dallas	11.7	18.8	US 321 Bus. north / NC 275 / NC 279 (Dallas-Cherryville Highway) – Cherryville	Signed exits 12A-B Northbound and exit 12 Southbound
North Carolina	Gaston		16.1	25.9	Hardin Road	Signed exit 17
North Carolina	Lincoln		18.8	30.3	US 321 Bus. (Gastonia Highway) – High Shoals, Lincolnton	Signed exit 20
North Carolina	Lincoln	Lincolnton	23.6	38.0	NC 27 / NC 150 (Main Street) – Lincolnton	Signed exit 24
North Carolina	Lincoln		27.0	43.5	US 321 Bus. (Maiden Highway) – Maiden	Signed exit 28
North Carolina	Catawba	Maiden	32.3	52.0	Startown Road	Signed exit 33
North Carolina	Catawba		36.2	58.3	NC 10 – Newton	Signed exit 37
North Carolina	Catawba		40.1	64.5	River Road	Signed exit 41
North Carolina	Catawba	Mountain View	41.4	66.6	NC 127 (Brookford Boulevard)	Signed exit 42
North Carolina	Catawba	Hickory	42.3	68.1	I-40 – Statesville, Asheville	Signed exits 43A (east) and 43B (west)
North Carolina	Catawba	Hickory	43.3	69.7	US 70 / US 321 Bus. south to NC 127 (Conover Boulevard) – Hickory	Signed exit 44
North Carolina	Catawba	Hickory	45.3	72.9	Clement Boulevard – Hickory Regional Airport	
North Carolina	Burke	No major junctions				
North Carolina	Caldwell	Northlakes	47.9	77.1	US 321A north – Granite Falls	
North Carolina	Caldwell	Granite Falls	50.1	80.6	Falls Avenue – Granite Falls	
North Carolina	Caldwell	Lenoir	56.8	91.4	Southwest Boulevard – Morganton	
North Carolina	Caldwell	Lenoir	59.1	95.1	US 321A south – Hudson	
North Carolina	Caldwell	Lenoir	60.1	96.7	US 64 / NC 18 / NC 90 east – Lenoir, Wilkesboro	East end of NC 90 overlap
North Carolina	Caldwell	Lenoir	62.3	100.3	NC 90 west (Main Street) – Lenoir, Collettsville	West end of NC 90 overlap
North Carolina	Caldwell		65.9	106.1	NC 268 east – Fort Defiance	
North Carolina	Watauga	Blowing Rock	79.4	127.8	US 321 Bus. north (Main Street)	
North Carolina	Watauga	Blowing Rock	80.6	129.7	US 221 south / US 321 Bus. south	South end of US 221 overlap
North Carolina	Watauga	Blowing Rock	81.4	131.0	Blue Ridge Parkway	To Moses H. Cone Memorial Park and Julian Price Memorial Park
North Carolina	Watauga	Boone	87.0	140.0	US 221 north / NC 105 – Linville, Banner Elk, Newland	North end of US 221 overlap
North Carolina	Watauga	Boone	87.9	141.5	US 421 south / NC 194 north (King Street)	South end of US 421 and north end of NC 194 overlap
North Carolina	Watauga	Vilas	93.6	150.6	NC 194 south – Valle Crucis	South end of NC 194 overlap
North Carolina	Watauga	Sugar Grove	94.3	151.8	US 421 north – Mountain City	North end of US 421 overlap
North Carolina	Avery	No major junctions				
			105.5 0.0	169.8 0.0	North Carolina–Tennessee state line	
Tennessee	Carter		12.5	20.1	SR 67 east – Mountain City	East end of SR 67 and west end of SR 159 (hidden) overlap
Tennessee	Carter	Hampton	12.5	20.1	US 19E south (SR 37) – Roan Mountain	South end of US 19E overlap
Tennessee	Carter	Elizabethton	27.2	43.8	US 19E / SR 91 (SR 37) – Bluff City	North end of US 19E and SR 91 overlap
Tennessee	Carter	Elizabethton	27.2	43.8	Route transition from northbound to southbound	
Tennessee	Carter	Elizabethton	28.0	45.1	SR 400 south – Watauga	
Tennessee	Carter	Elizabethton	31.3	50.4	SR 91 / SR 362 south	South end of SR 91 overlap
Tennessee	Carter	Elizabethton	31.9	51.3	SR 359 south – Milligan College	
Tennessee	Washington	Johnson City	35.3	56.8	Legion Street / Milligan Highway	Interchange
Tennessee	Washington	Johnson City	35.8	57.6	I-26 / US 19W / US 23 – Erwin, Kingsport	Intrechange; exit 24 (I-26)
Tennessee	Washington	Johnson City	36.7	59.1	SR 67 west / SR 381 (Cherokee Road)	West end of SR 67 and south end of SR 381 overlap
Tennessee	Washington	Johnson City	39.5	63.6	US 11E / SR 381 north (SR 34 / State of Franklin Road)	North end of US 11E and SR 381 overlap
Tennessee	Washington	Jonesborough	44.3	71.3	SR 354 (Boones Creek Road) / Boone Street – Boones Creek, Business District	
Tennessee	Washington	Jonesborough			To SR 81 / Washington Drive – Kingsport, Erwin, Business District	
Tennessee	Washington	Jonesborough			To SR 81 / Persimmon Ridge Road – Lamar, Erwin	
Tennessee	Washington	Limestone	54.4	87.5	SR 75 north (Opie Arnold Road)	
Tennessee	Greene		58.0	93.3	SR 351 (Chuckey Pike) – Chuckey, Rheatown	
Tennessee	Greene	Tusculum	62.6	100.7	SR 107 east (Tusculum Bypass) – Erwin, Tusculum College	East end of SR 107 (hidden) overlap
Tennessee	Greene	Greeneville			Erwin Highway – Tusculum, Tusculum College	Former SR 107
Tennessee	Greene	Greeneville	65.2	104.9	US 11E Bus. south (SR 107 / Tusculum Boulevard)	West end of SR 107 (hidden) overlap
Tennessee	Greene	Greeneville	66.0	106.2	Snapps Ferry Road	Interchange
Tennessee	Greene	Greeneville	67.1	108.0	US 11E south (SR 34) / SR 93 north (Kingsport Highway) – Kingsport, Morristown	South end of US 11E overlap; southern terminus of SR 93
Tennessee	Greene	Greeneville	67.3	108.3	SR 172 north (Baileyton Road) – Baileyton, Airport	Southern terminus of SR 172
Tennessee	Greene	Greeneville	68.0	109.4	US 11E Bus. north (SR 107 / Tusculum Boulevard)	North end of US 11E Bus. overlap
Tennessee	Greene	Greeneville	68.4	110.1	US 11E Bus. south (SR 350 / West Summer Street) / SR 350 north	South end of US 11E Bus. overlap
Tennessee	Greene	Greeneville	68.5	110.2	SR 350 south (McKee Street)	South end of SR 350 (hidden) overlap
Tennessee	Greene	Greeneville	69.5	111.8	SR 70 / SR 107 west (Asheville Highway)	West end of SR 107 (hidden) overlap
Tennessee	Greene	Greeneville	71.3	114.7	SR 349 west (Warrensburg Road)	Eastern terminus of SR 349
Tennessee	Cocke	Parrottsville	87.3	140.5	SR 340 – Parrottsville, Del Rio	
Tennessee	Cocke		91.6	147.4	SR 160 north – Bybee	Southern terminus of SR 160
Tennessee	Cocke	Newport	93.7	150.8	US 25 south / US 70 (SR 9 / Broadway Street)	South end of US 25 and east end of US 70 overlap
Tennessee	Cocke	Newport	94.0	151.3	US 25 north (SR 9) / US 70 west (SR 35) / SR 32 north (Broadway Street)	North end of US 25 / SR 32 and west end of US 70 overlap
Tennessee	Cocke	Newport	95.5	153.7	I-40 – Knoxville, Asheville	I-40 exit 435
Tennessee	Cocke		101.1	162.7	SR 73 north (Wilton Springs Road)	North end of SR 73 (hidden) overlap
Tennessee	Cocke	Cosby	106.0	170.6	SR 339 west (Jones Cove Road) – Cherokee Hills	Eastern terminus of SR 339
Tennessee	Cocke	Cosby	106.2	170.9	Foothills Parkway to I-40	Western terminus of section 8A of the Foothills Parkway
Tennessee	Cocke	Cosby	108.0	173.8	SR 32 south	South end of SR 32 overlap
Tennessee	Sevier	Pittman Center	119.9	193.0	SR 416 north (Pittman Center Road)	Southern terminus of SR 416
Tennessee	Sevier	Gatlinburg–Pittman Center line	120.8	194.4	SR 454 north (Buckhorn Road)	Southern terminus of SR 454
Tennessee	Sevier	Gatlinburg	126.1	202.9	US 441 south / SR 73 Scenic west (Parkway/SR 71) – Great Smoky Mountains National Park	South end of US 441 overlap; eastern terminus of SR 73 Scenic
Tennessee	Sevier	Gatlinburg	127.2	204.7	Gatlinburg Parkway Bypass – Great Smoky Mountains National Park	No access from northbound US 441/US 321
Tennessee	Sevier	Pigeon Forge			SR 449 north (Dollywood Lane) – Dollywood	Southern terminus of SR 449
Tennessee	Sevier	Pigeon Forge	134.5	216.5	US 441 north (Parkway/SR 71) – Sevierville	North end of US 441 overlap
Tennessee	Sevier	Wears Valley	142.9	230.0	Foothills Parkway	Interchange; eastern terminus of western section of Foothills Parkway
Tennessee	Blount	Townsend	149.4	240.4	SR 73 Scenic east (East Lamar Alexander Parkway/SR 337) – Great Smoky Mountains National Park	Western terminus of SR 73 Scenic
Tennessee	Blount	Walland	156.8	252.3	Foothills Parkway – Top of The World, Chilhowee Lake, Great Smoky Mountains National Park Look Rock area	Interchange
Tennessee	Blount	Maryville	166.7	268.3	SR 447 north (Washington Street) to US 411 north	Southern terminus of SR 447
Tennessee	Blount	Maryville	167.4	269.4	SR 336 south (Montvale Road)	Northern terminus of SR 336
Tennessee	Blount	Maryville	167.6	269.7	US 411 (Broadway Avenue/SR 33) – Rockford, Madisonville	
Tennessee	Blount	Maryville	168.7	271.5	US 129 (SR 115) – Alcoa, Knoxville	
Tennessee	Blount	Maryville	171.0	275.2	SR 335 north (Old Glory Road)	North end of SR 335 overlap
Tennessee	Blount	Maryville	171.6	276.2	SR 335 south (William Blount Drive)	South end of SR 335 overlap
Tennessee	Blount	Friendsville	176.1	283.4	SR 333 north (Main Avenue) – Friendsville	Southern terminus of SR 333
Tennessee	Loudon		181.4	291.9	SR 95 south (Lenoir City Road) – Greenback	South end of SR 95 (hidden) overlap
Tennessee	Loudon		185.0	297.7	SR 444 west (Tellico Parkway) – Tellico Village	Eastern terminus of SR 444
Tennessee	Loudon	Lenoir City	186.8	300.6	US 11 (Broadway Street/SR 2) – Knoxville, Loudon, Farragut	
Tennessee	Loudon	Lenoir City	189.5	305.0	I-75 – Knoxville, Chattanooga	I-75 exit 81
Tennessee	Loudon	Lenoir City	190.3	306.3	US 70 (Kingston Pike/SR 1) – Knoxville, Kingston	
Tennessee	Loudon	Lenoir City	194.2	312.5	I-40 / SR 95 north (White Wing Road) – Knoxville, Nashville, Oak Ridge	West end of SR 73 (hidden) and north end of SR 95 (hidden) overlap; I-40 exit 364
1.000 mi = 1.609 km; 1.000 km = 0.621 mi: Concurrency terminus; Route transition; Unopened

== Special routes ==
=== Winnsboro business loop ===
U.S. Highway 321 Business
- Location: Winnsboro, South Carolina
- Length: 4.350 mi (7.001 km)
- Existed: 1952–present

U.S. Route 321 Business (US 321 Bus.) is a 4.350-mile (7.001 km) business route of US 321 that exists in Winnsboro Mills and Winnsboro, via Columbia Road and Congress Street. It was established around 1951 or 1952, when mainline US 321 was rerouted west, bypassing Winnsboro.

=== Chester business loop ===
U.S. Highway 321 Business
- Location: Chester, South Carolina
- Length: 3.670 mi (5.906 km)
- Existed: 1964–present

U.S. Route 321 Business (US 321 Bus.) is a 3.670-mile (5.906 km) business route of US 321 in the city of Chester. It traverses downtown Chester, via Columbia Street and Center Road. It was established between 1962 and 1964, when mainline US 321 was rerouted west, bypassing Chester.

=== York business loop ===
U.S. Highway 321 Business
- Location: York, South Carolina
- Length: 2.500 mi (4.023 km)
- Existed: 1958–present

U.S. Route 321 Business (US 321 Bus.) is a 2.500-mile (4.023 km) business route of US 321 in the city of York, utilizing Congress Street and Kings Mountain Street. It was established around 1957–1958, when mainline US 321 was rerouted west, bypassing York.

=== Dallas–Hickory business loop ===
U.S. Highway 321 Business
- Location: Dallas–Hickory, NC
- Length: 37.2 mi (59.9 km)
- Existed: 1999–present

U.S. Route 321 Business (US 321 Bus) was established in June 1999, as a renumbering all of NC 155 and part of mainline US 321 in Catawba County. Traversing 37.2 miles (59.9 km) through Gaston, Lincoln and Catawba counties, it connects the cities and towns of Dallas, High Shoals, Lincolnton, Maiden, Newton, Conover and Hickory. The highway follows the original US 321 routing through that existed prior to 1994.

=== Lincolnton alternate route ===
U.S. Highway 321A
- Location: Lincolnton, North Carolina
- Length: 3.4 mi (5.5 km)
- Existed: 1956–1960

U.S. Route 321 Alternate (US 321A) was established 1956 when mainline US 321 was placed on new bypass east of downtown Lincolnton. It traversed along Aspen Street and around the Lincoln County Civil Court on Court Square Drive. In 1960 it was decommissioned, with Aspen Street becoming secondary roads.

=== Granite Falls–Lenoir alternate route ===
U.S. Highway 321A
- Location: Granite Falls–Lenoir, NC
- Length: 11.8 mi (19.0 km)
- Existed: 1948–present

U.S. Route 321 Alternate (US 321A) was established 1948 as a number swap with US 321 through downtown Lenoir. In 1957, US 321A was extended south, replacing mainline US 321 through Granite Falls and Hudson, ending at its current southern terminus north of the Catawba River. In June 1964, US 321A was placed on one-way splits through downtown Lenoir; northbound continued along Mulberry Street and West Avenue, southbound rerouted along Main Street and College Avenue. In September 2006, US 321A was rerouted to its current northern terminus, just south of downtown Lenoir, via McLean Drive. Its old alignment through downtown Lenoir was carried on by NC 90 until 2012, when it too was rerouted; the old alignment is now under city control.

Traversing through Granite Falls, Sawmills, Hudson and Lenoir US 321A has not changed much over the years. Predominantly a two-lane highway, it parallels a short line railroad and connects to several factories and downtowns.

=== Lenoir alternate route ===
U.S. Highway 321A
- Location: Lenoir, North Carolina
- Length: 5.9 mi (9.5 km)
- Existed: 1941–1948

U.S. Route 321 Alternate (US 321A) was established 1941 as a new alternate route bypassing Lenoir. In 1948, it was replaced by mainline US 321.

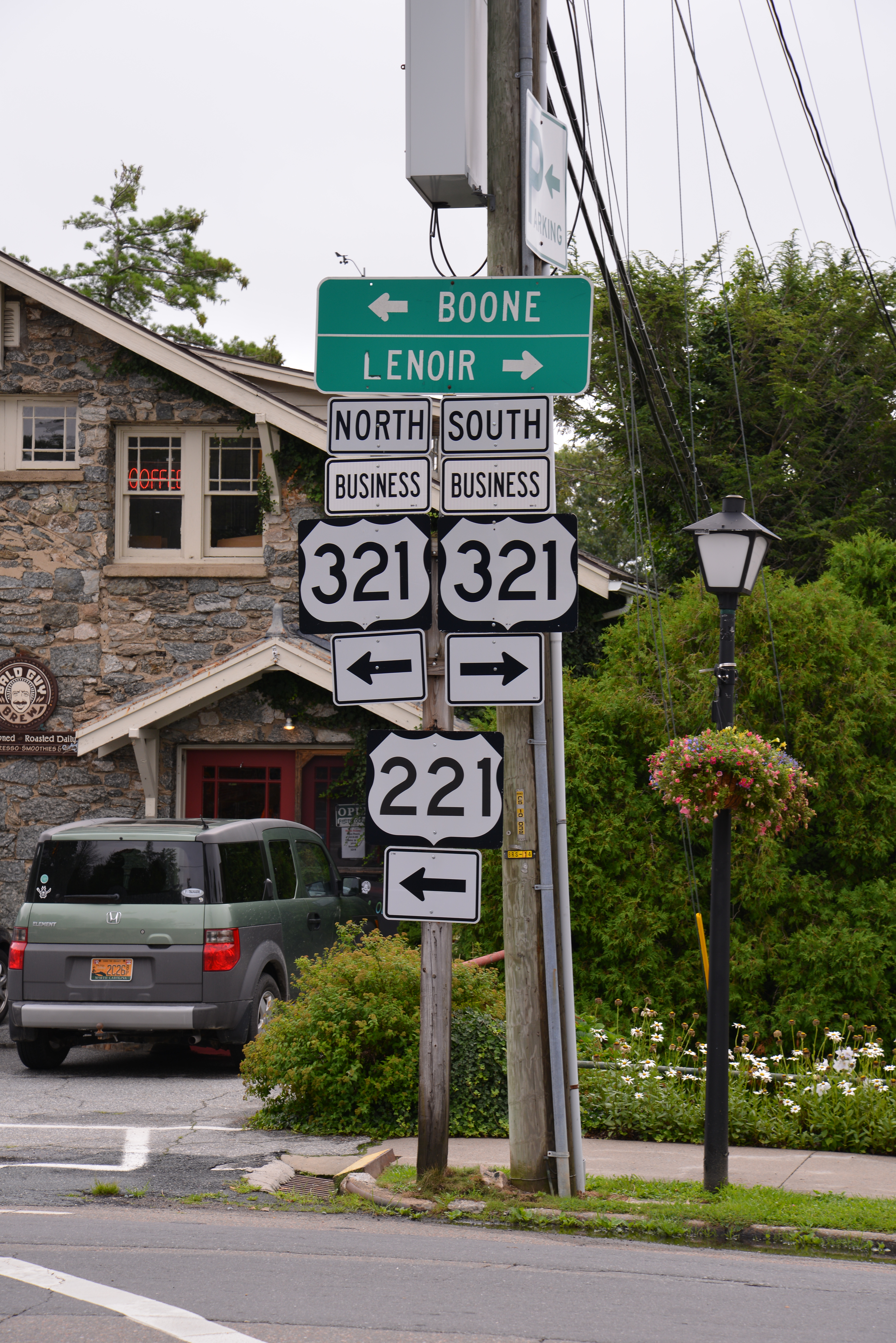
US 221/US 321 Bus. in Blowing Rock

=== Blowing Rock business loop ===
U.S. Highway 321 Business
- Location: Blowing Rock, North Carolina
- Length: 2.0 mi (3.2 km)
- Existed: 1960–present

U.S. Route 321 Business (US 321 Bus) was established 1960 as an upgrade to secondary roads through downtown Blowing Rock; which were originally part of mainline US 321 until about 1954, when it was moved onto a new bypass east. The highway traverses along Main Street and shares a concurrency with US 221 for 0.8 miles (1.3 km) on its northern section.

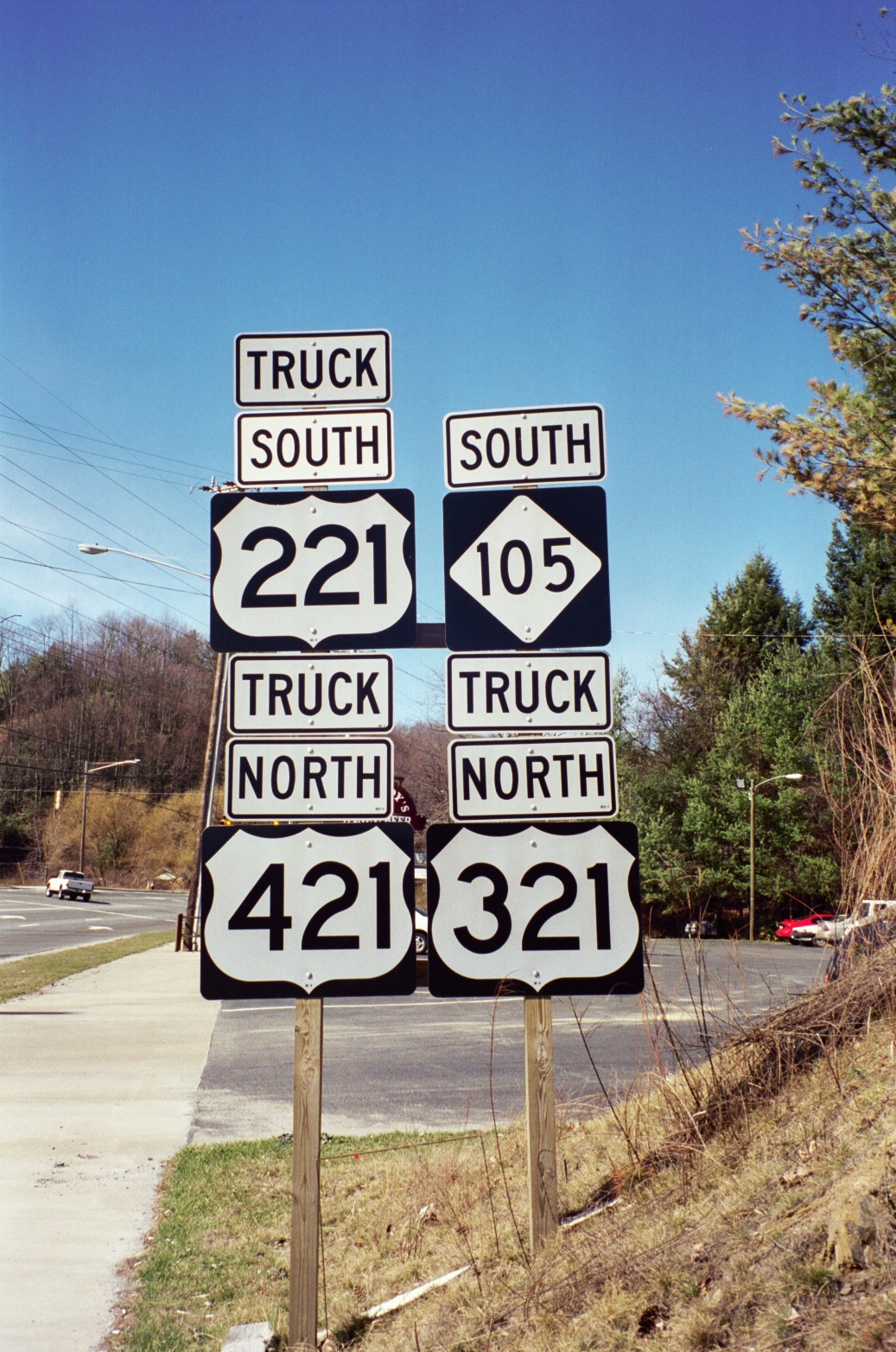
US 221 Truck/US 321 Truck/US 421 Truck/NC 105 traveling concurrent through the Boone area

=== Boone truck route ===
U.S. Highway 321 Truck
- Location: Boone, North Carolina
- Length: 4.0 mi (6.4 km)

U.S. Route 321 Truck (US 321 Truck) redirects truckers traveling through the area to go south and around downtown Boone, via NC 105 and NC Highway 105 Bypass (SR-1107). The shares some overlap with US 221 Truck and complete overlap with US 421 Truck.

=== Greeneville truck route ===
U.S. Route 321 Truck
- Location: Greeneville, Tennessee
- Length: 3.6 mi (5.8 km)

U.S. Route 321 Truck (US 321 Truck) redirects truckers traveling south on US 321 around downtown. It shares a concurrency with US 11E and SR 70. The route begins at US 11E/US 321 and ends 3.6 miles (5.8 km) later at US 321/SR 70.

The entire route is in Greeneville, Greene County.

mi	km	Destinations	Notes
0.0	0.0	US 321 / SR 35 (West Main Street) / SR 70 south (Asheville Highway) / SR 107 (Asheville Highway / West Main Street) – Greeneville, Parrottsville, Newport, Del Rio, Asheville	Southern terminus of US 321 Truck and end SR 70 overlap
1.0	1.6	US 11E Bus. north (West Summer Street) / SR 350 south (West Summer Street) – Downtown Greeneville	Begin US 11E Business concurrency; Northern terminus of SR 350
1.2	1.9	US 11E south / SR 34 south (West Andrew Johnson Highway) / Blue Springs Parkway – Mosheim, Bulls Gap, Morristown	Southern terminus of US 11E Business; Begin US 11E/SR 34 overlap
1.7	2.7	SR 70 north (Lonesome Pine Trail) – Romeo, Rogersville	End SR 70 overlap
2.0	3.2	SR 172 north (Baileyton Road) / WhiteHouse Road – Baileyton, Airport	Southern terminus of SR 172; Interchange
3.4	5.5	US 11E north / US 321 (North Main Street / East Andrew Johnson Highway) / SR 34 north (East Andrew Johnson Highway) / SR 35 south (North Main Street) – Jonesborough, Johnson City, Newport, Downtown Greeneville	End US 321 Truck
3.6	5.8	SR 93 north (Kingsport Highway) – Fall Branch, Kingsport	Southern terminus of SR 93
1.000 mi = 1.609 km; 1.000 km = 0.621 mi: Concurrency terminus
