= Downtown Loop =

The Downtown Loop may refer to:

- Downtown Loop (Kansas City)
- Atlanta Streetcar
- A common name for a freeway loop around Nashville, Tennessee, that consists of I-24, I-40, and I-65, also known as the Inner Loop.
- The former partially built freeway in Knoxville, Tennessee, that consists of Tennessee State Route 158 and I-40.

== See also ==
- Chicago Loop
- Delmar Loop, Missouri, U.S.
