= Tennessee State Route 429 =

Former state highway in Tennessee, United States

State Route 429
- Airbase Road

Route information
- Maintained by TDOT
- Length: 1.85 mi (2.98 km)

Major junctions
- South end: Tennessee Air National Guard
- North end: US 129 at Alcoa

Location
- Country: United States
- State: Tennessee
- Counties: Blount

Highway system
- Tennessee State Routes; Interstate; US; State
← SR 425	→ SR 431

Former State Route 429 (SR 429), also known as Airbase Road, was a south-to-north secondary highway in Blount County, Tennessee, that was 1.85 miles (3.0 km) long. Its southern terminus was at the Tennessee Air National Guard gate and the northern terminus was with US 129/SR 115 (Airport Highway). The road was decommissioned in 2009 when the Tennessee Air National Guard gate was moved, and Airbase Road was rerouted on new construction to the west, making the old road private. The entire route of SR 429 was signed when it existed.

== Major intersections ==
The entire route was in Alcoa, Blount County.

mi	km	Destinations	Notes
0.00	0.00	US 129 (Alcoa Highway; SR 115)	
1.85	2.98	Tennessee Air National Guard entrance gate	End state maintenance
1.000 mi = 1.609 km; 1.000 km = 0.621 mi
