= Greeneville–Greene County Municipal Airport =

Greeneville Municipal Airport
- IATA: GCY; ICAO: KGCY; FAA LID: GCY

Summary
- Airport type: Public
- Owner: Town of Greeneville
- Location: Greeneville, Tennessee
- Elevation AMSL: 1,608 ft (490 m)
- Coordinates: 36°11′35″N 082°48′54″W

Map
- Location of airport in Tennessee GCY (the United States)

Runways
Direction	Length		Surface
Direction	ft	m	Surface
5/23	6,300	1,920	Asphalt

Statistics (2019)
- Aircraft operations (year ending 8/31/2019): 37,730
- Source: Federal Aviation Administration

Greeneville Municipal Airport (IATA: GCY, ICAO: KGCY, FAA LID: GCY) is a public airport located two miles (3 km) north of the central business district of Greeneville, a town in Greene County, Tennessee, United States. It is owned by the Town of Greeneville.

== Facilities and aircraft ==
Greeneville Municipal Airport covers an area of 160 acres (65 ha) which contains one asphalt paved runway (5/23) measuring 6,300 x 100 ft (1,920 x 30 m). For the 12-month period ending August 31, 2019, the airport had 37,730 aircraft operations, an average of 103 per day: 80% general aviation, 19% air taxi, and 1% military.

== See also ==
- List of airports in Tennessee
