= Tennessee State Route 158 =

Highway in Knoxville, Tennessee, United States

State Route 158
- Neyland Drive; James White Parkway
- SR 158 is highlighted in red

Route information
- Maintained by TDOT
- Length: 4.63 mi (7.45 km)
- Existed: 1958–present
- History: Completed September 15, 1973

Major junctions
- West end: US 11 / US 70 in Knoxville
- US 129 in Knoxville; SR 450 in Knoxville; SR 71 in Knoxville
- East end: I-40 in Knoxville

Location
- Country: United States
- State: Tennessee
- Counties: Knox

Highway system
- Tennessee State Routes; Interstate; US; State
| ← SR 157 | → SR 159 |

State Route 158 (SR 158) is a major east–west state highway in the city of Knoxville in the U.S. state of Tennessee. It runs 4.63 miles (7.45 km) from Kingston Pike (US 11/US 70) along the Tennessee River to Interstate 40. The western portion of the highway is a surface street known as Neyland Drive and the eastern part is a controlled-access highway called James White Parkway. The entire highway serves as a bypass of downtown Knoxville and as a direct connector to the University of Tennessee (UT) campus and athletic facilities. Serving as the primary means of access to facilities such as Neyland Stadium and Thompson–Boling Arena, the route experiences congestion on game days, with a contraflow lane reversal implemented to mitigate this. It also serves as a spur into downtown and provides access to a number of local landmarks and historic sites, including the Blount Mansion and James White's Fort.

The highway that is now SR 158 has its origins in the original plat for Knoxville from 1791, which included a road along the riverfront. An extension of this road was completed in 1951 to serve Neyland Stadium, and a freeway loop around Downtown Knoxville was proposed that same year. The eastern portion of this freeway loop, which was initially known as the Downtown Loop, became the controlled-access part of SR 158, and was constructed in three segments between 1963 and 1973. This section of SR 158 was extensively reconstructed between 2005 and 2007 in a major project known as "SmartFix 40", which also involved a major reconstruction and widening of the connecting segment of I-40.

== Route description ==
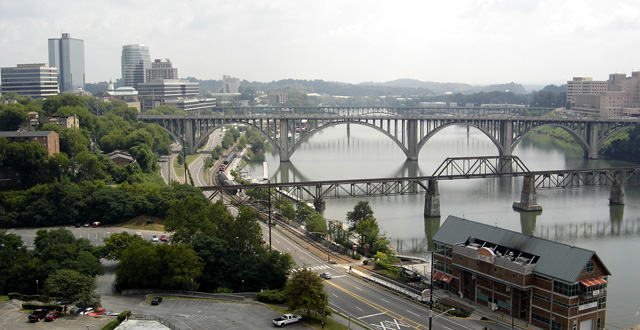
SR 158 (Neyland Drive) viewed from the top of Neyland Stadium

The entire highway is a part of the National Highway System, a national network of roads identified as important to the national economy, defense, and mobility. In 2024, annual average daily traffic volumes ranged from 5,245 vehicles through the interchange with SR 71 to 40,798 vehicles between I-40 and Summit Hill Drive. During football games, a contraflow lane reversal is implemented, which allows only westbound traffic between Lake Loudoun Boulevard and US 11/US 70 (Kingston Pike), and eastbound-only traffic between Lake Loudoun Boulevard and I-40. This allows for better management of congestion caused by patrons entering and leaving Neyland Stadium. Neyland Greenway, a multi-use trail, parallels most of Neyland Drive.

SR 158 begins as a secondary highway known as Neyland Drive at an intersection with Kingston Pike on the western edge of the University of Tennessee (UT) campus. The road passes by the UTK Sorority Village before meeting the north bank of the Tennessee River and running alongside a Norfolk Southern Railway track. The route then turns southeast and passes underneath the J. E. "Buck" Carnes Bridge, which carries US 129 (Alcoa Highway), a major freeway in Knoxville, across the river. This highway is accessed via a partial cloverleaf interchange with SR 158, with only the northbound lanes accessible from the latter. The route then has a signalized intersection with Joe Johnson Drive (unsigned SR 450). The road passes by a number of other UT facilities, including the university's veterinary school, before gradually turning east along the State Botanical Garden of Tennessee and crossing Third Creek. SR 158 then has an at-grade crossing with a railroad spur. Turning north-northeast, the road passes under a Norfolk Southern crossing of the Tennessee River, and has a signalized intersection with Lake Loudoun Boulevard. It then passes by Thompson–Boling Arena, the home of the Tennessee Volunteers basketball team, and Neyland Stadium, the home of the Tennessee Volunteers football team, before crossing another railroad at-grade. Turning eastward, SR 158 next passes underneath a CSX railroad bridge. Immediately afterward, the highway passes under the Henley Street Bridge, which carries US 441 across the river, with no direct access between the two. The route then has a signalized intersection with Walnut Street next to the Knoxville City-County Building, which houses the main offices of the City of Knoxville and Knox County. Here a pedestrian bridge across the road provides access to a parking lot along the river. SR 158 then passes directly under the Gay Street Bridge, where the controlled-access portion begins at an eastbound-only exit for Volunteer Landing, a public park.

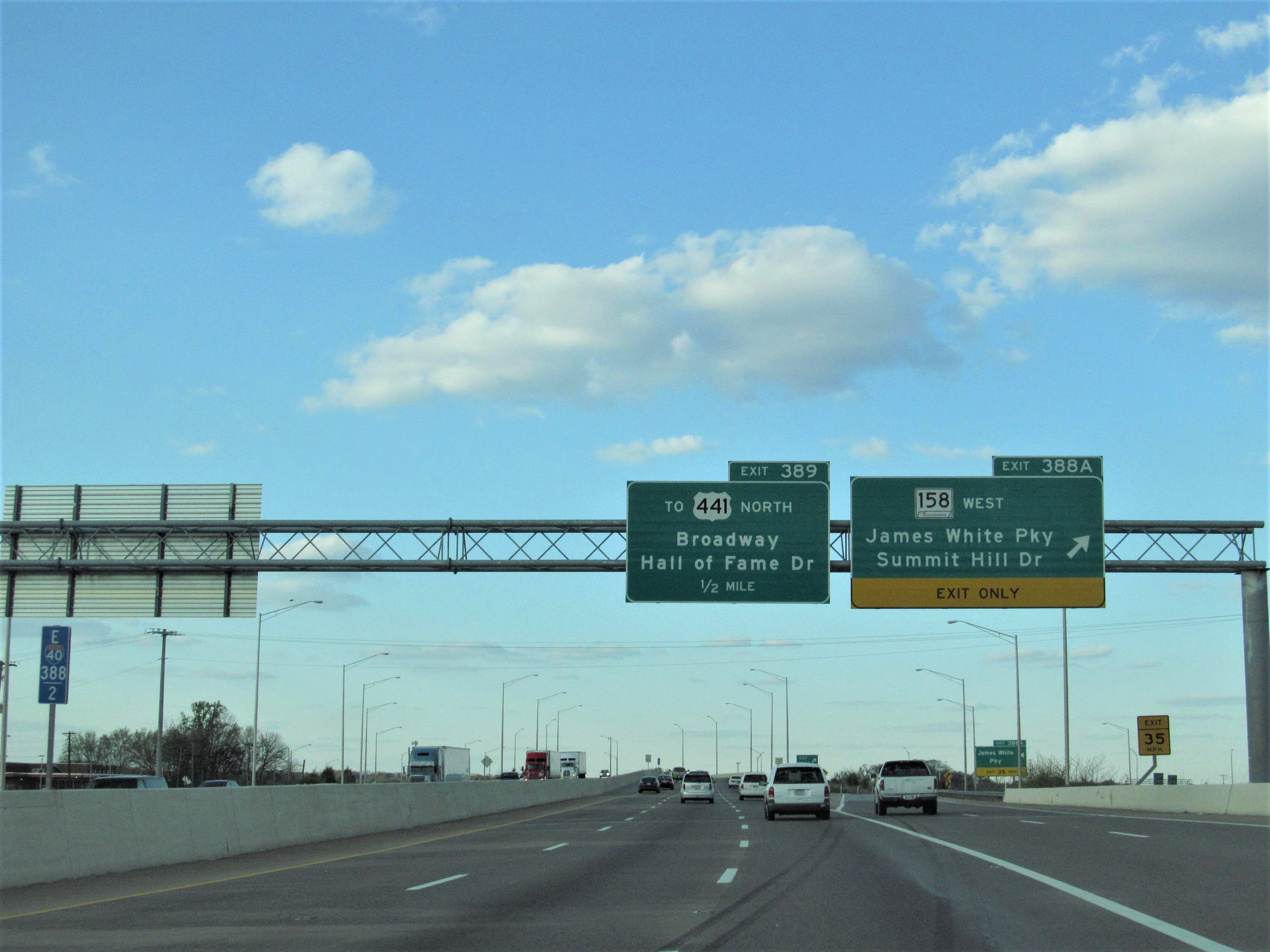
The eastern terminus of SR 158 on I-40 eastbound

Turning sharply north, the highway transitions away from the riverbank, passes by the Blount Mansion and James White's Fort, and underneath the Hill Avenue Bridge. SR 158 then has a complex partial interchange with Hall of Fame Drive, which US 11 and US 70 split off onto, and SR 71 (James White Parkway). Partial access to Cumberland Avenue and Main Street is also provided from the westbound lanes. The Neyland Drive designation ends here and SR 158 picks up James White Parkway for the remainder of its length. Through this interchange, the highway passes underneath Knoxville Station Transit Center, the main hub for Knoxville Area Transit. Also at this interchange, the highway expands to six lanes, before reaching a partial interchange that contains a westbound exit to Summit Hill Drive and an eastbound entrance from Hall of Fame Drive, the latter of which parallels SR 158 at this point. Here the freeway expands to eight lanes and then crosses a long viaduct over a railroad and several city streets. SR 158 then reaches its eastern terminus at a semi-directional T interchange with I-40 south of the Fourth and Gill neighborhood. At this interchange, the ramp to I-40 eastbound continues past the nearby I-40 interchange with Hall of Fame Drive, and SR 158 westbound is accessed from I-40 westbound via a slip ramp which also provides access to Hall of Fame Drive.

=== Namesake ===
Neyland Drive is named for Robert Neyland, who served three stints as the Tennessee Volunteers football coach between 1926 and 1952. He also served as an officer in the United States Army, reaching the rank of brigadier general. The road was named Neyland Drive by an act of the Knoxville City Council on September 25, 1951. James White Parkway is named in honor of James White, a general in the American Revolutionary War who constructed White's Fort in 1786, which grew into the city of Knoxville. White is widely considered the founder of Knoxville. The highway was officially named James White Parkway by the Knoxville Metropolitan Planning Commission on May 9, 1991.

== History ==
=== Background and early history ===
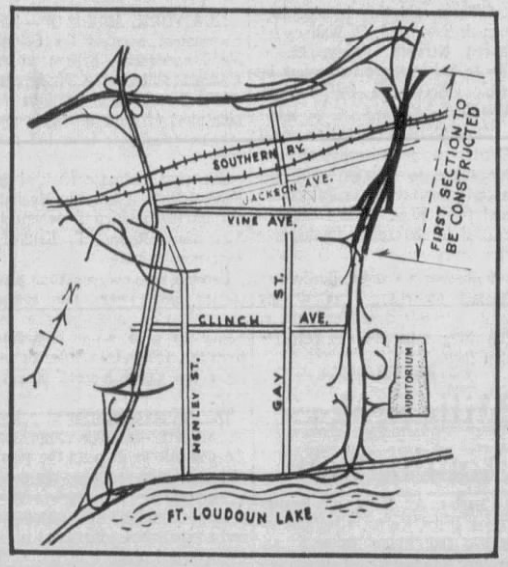
An illustration produced by The Knoxville News-Sentinel in 1962 showing the proposed routing of the Downtown Loop, with the first section that was constructed highlighted

The original plat of Knoxville drawn out by Charles McClung in 1791 included a street along the riverfront called Front Street, which later came to be known as Front Avenue. This street was subsequently extended to the west in a plan created by General James White four years later.

In 1945, the city of Knoxville commissioned a plan which recommended that a series of freeways be constructed throughout the city to relieve traffic congestion on surface streets. These freeways were intended to be integrated into the then-proposed nationwide network of freeways that later became the Interstate Highway System, which at the time, was expected to eventually be authorized by Congress. At the same time, the University of Tennessee and the city of Knoxville were looking to relieve game-day traffic congestion around Neyland Stadium, which was then called Shields–Watkins Field. On October 23, 1950, Tennessee Governor Gordon Browning instructed state highway commissioner Charles F. Wayland Jr. to begin work on a two-lane extension of Front Street, initially known as Lakefront Drive, to Kingston Pike. This road, which was renamed Neyland Drive along with Front Avenue, was constructed the following year, opening to traffic on September 29, 1951. A wooden bridge on the original Front Avenue portion of Neyland Drive over Second Creek was replaced with a corrugated steel-structured bridge with an asphalt deck between February and March 1955.

In 1951, a preliminary concept was drawn up for a freeway loop around downtown, which included upgrading part of Neyland Drive. The northern portion of this loop included part of the Magnolia Avenue Expressway, which became part of Interstate 40 after the Federal-Aid Highway Act of 1956 was passed. On January 10, 1957, a proposal for a square-shaped freeway loop called the Downtown Loop was presented to the Knoxville Metropolitan Planning Commission. Engineering work began in August 1957, and the design for this freeway was jointly approved on July 17, 1958, by the Bureau of Public Roads, predecessor to the Federal Highway Administration (FHWA); and the Tennessee Department of Highways, now the Tennessee Department of Transportation (TDOT).

Work on the first section, located between Vine Street and Magnolia Avenue, began on January 22, 1963, and was opened to traffic on June 23, 1964, in a ceremony officiated by Knoxville Mayor John Duncan Sr. The section between Magnolia Avenue and I-40, along with the interchange with I-40 and a short section of this route, opened on April 11, 1967. Preliminary work on the section between Riverside Drive and Vine Avenue began on June 18, 1970, with the construction of a long culvert over First Creek. Major construction on this section was delayed on September 8, 1970, due to the need to acquire 0.16 acres (0.065 ha) from the Blount Mansion Property, which required additional studies under legislation designed to protect historic properties. After this issue was resolved, the routing was approved by U.S. Secretary of Transportation John A. Volpe on April 14, 1971, and construction began on July 20. After multiple weather-related delays, this section opened to traffic on September 15, 1973, and was dedicated in a ceremony by Governor Winfield Dunn and Knoxville Mayor Kyle Testerman four days later. The University of Tennessee provided TDOT with the necessary right of way to widen Neyland Drive to four lanes in 1972. This project took place between February 1973 and August 1974, and required small artificial fills in the river and a relocation of the railroad tracks. A dedication ceremony for the completion of this project was led by Governor Dunn on September 6, 1974.

=== Later history ===
By the time the last stretch of the controlled-access section of SR 158 was under construction, the city's commercial center had already begun to shift towards the west, due to the completion of the concurrent stretch of I-40 and I-75 in the earlier 1960s. As a result of this, the original plans for the Downtown Loop were essentially rendered obsolete and never realized, and this section would be the last part of SR 158 to be constructed. By this time, portions of the original freeway network in Knoxville were also starting to suffer from congestion, rendering the original designs dangerous and outdated. The eastern terminus of SR 158 with I-40 quickly developed a high crash rate, largely due to left-hand entrance and exit ramps on I-40 westbound. Reconstruction of this interchange to eliminate this hazard was suggested as early as 1971. By 1977, UT officials requested the signalization of the junction between Neyland Drive and Lake Loudoun Boulevard. A signal was installed in 1980 following funding from UT, local, state, and federal aid. In preparation for the 1982 World's Fair, the Knoxville area received $250 million (equivalent to $705 million in 2025) to accelerate a number of needed transportation projects. These included reconstruction of the infamous "Malfunction Junction" between I-40 and I-75 (now I-275), which had also been planned as the terminus for the western leg of the Downtown Loop; widening parts of I-40; and completion of I-640, a northern bypass around downtown. The connecting section of I-40 and the SR 158 interchange were not included in this project, but nevertheless, TDOT began tentative plans for improvements to these problematic spots.

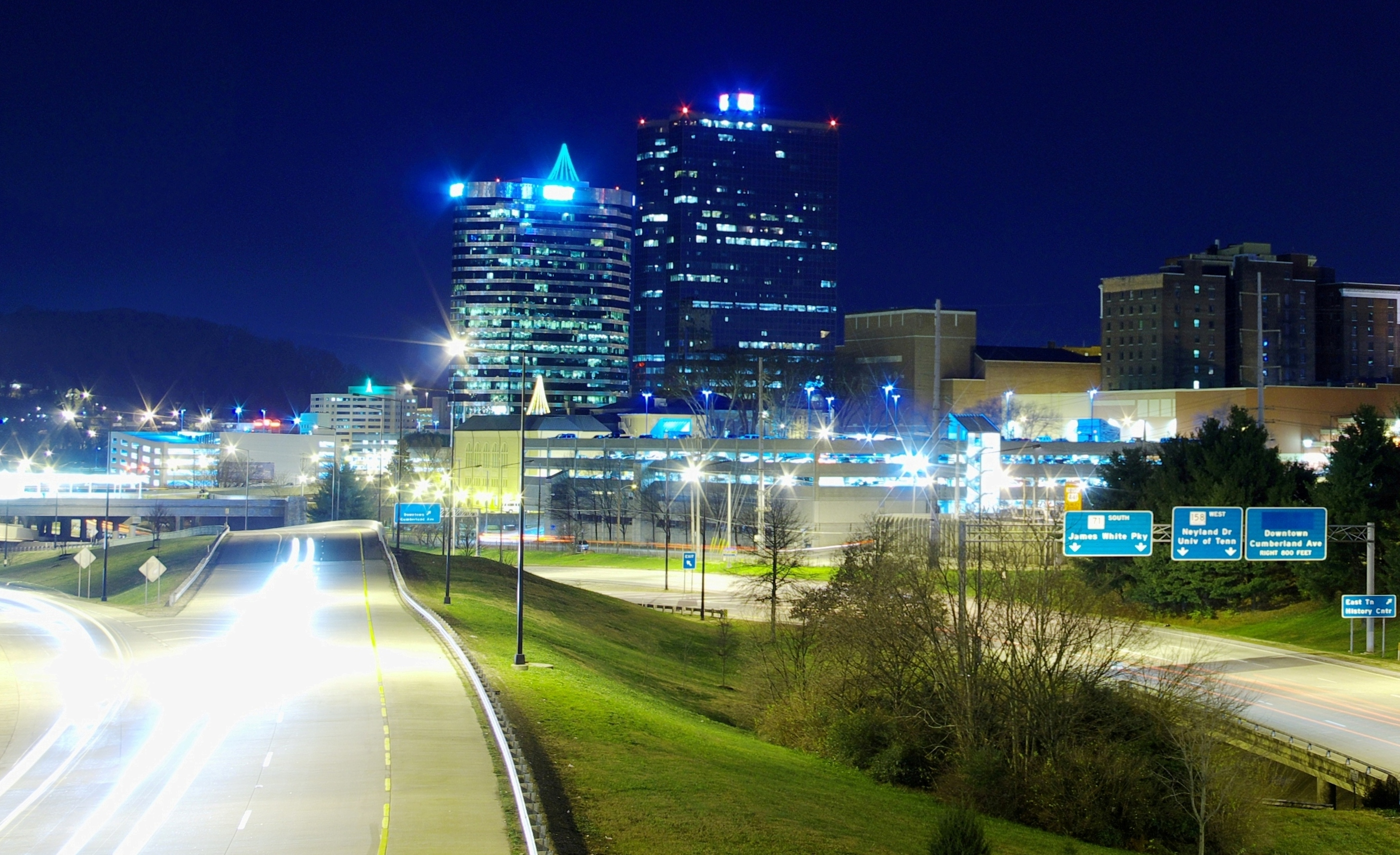
View of the reconstructed SR 158 at the intersection with SR 71 at night

Concepts for proposed improvements to the controlled-access section of SR 158 and the connecting section of I-40 were presented to the public on December 11, 1989, and April 5 and 6, 1990. Preliminary engineering began in 1995, with the final design settled on that year. Additional public hearings were held between November 1995 and January 2000, and the environmental impact statement for the project was approved by the FHWA on February 28, 2002. On June 14, 2004, the details of the project were revealed to the public, and the name was announced as "SmartFix 40". The project was divided into two phases, each of which were divided into two smaller phases.

The first part of the first phase began on July 6, 2005. Hall of Fame Drive was extended from I-40 to SR 71 on an alignment parallel to SR 158, which eliminated an off-ramp from SR 158 eastbound to Hall of Fame Drive and Magnolia Avenue. The interchange on I-40 with Hall of Fame Drive was reconstructed, and new collector-distributor ramps between this interchange and the SR 158 interchange were built. The Summit Hill Drive bridge over SR 158 was also replaced. The first part of the first phase was completed on December 14, 2006, when the Hall of Fame Drive extension was dedicated and opened. For the next part of the first phase, the James White Parkway portion of SR 158 was closed to all traffic between December 17, 2006, and September 21, 2007, to accelerate the reconstruction of this segment. The northern portion of this stretch was widened, the Church Avenue bridge was replaced with the transit center viaduct, and a new ramp from I-40 eastbound to SR 158 westbound was constructed. For the second phase, I-40 between SR 158 and Hall of Fame Drive was completely closed to all traffic between May 1, 2008, and June 12, 2009. This allowed for this stretch of I-40 to be widened to six lanes and for the SR 158 interchange to be reconstructed on an accelerated basis. During this closure, through traffic was required to use I-640 or surface streets, and local traffic was required to exit I-40 onto SR 158 from the eastbound lanes and Hall of Fame Drive from the westbound lanes. The Knoxville Station Transit Center atop the highway opened the following year. Both phases of SmartFix 40 won an America's Transportation Award from the American Association of State Highway and Transportation Officials in 2008 and 2010, respectively. At a cost of $203.7 million (equivalent to $297 million in 2025), SmartFix 40 was at the time the largest project ever undertaken by TDOT, and the second of its kind attempted in the US.

From March 1997 to January 2000, a connector between SR 158 and the South Knoxville Bridge was constructed, requiring expansion of the interchange with Hall of Fame Drive and Cumberland Avenue. Initially known as the South Knoxville Boulevard, this route was later renamed as an extension of James White Parkway. Between the fall of 2000 and the summer of 2002, a connector from SR 158 and Volunteer Boulevard on UT's main campus was constructed to provide access from UT's agricultural campus to its main campus. Named Joe Johnson Drive, the road is designated as SR 450. Between April 2015 and August 2017, the city of Knoxville undertook a streetscaping project which transformed a short stretch of Cumberland Avenue east of the western terminus of SR 158 from an urban thoroughfare into a pedestrian and bike friendly corridor. As part of this project, US 11/70 were rerouted onto the stretch of SR 158 between the eastern terminus and the interchange with SR 71, as well as onto Hall of Fame Drive between SR 71 and Magnolia Avenue.

== Major intersections ==
The entire route is in Knoxville, Knox County.

| mi | km | Destinations | Notes |
|---|---|---|---|
| 0.00 | 0.00 | US 11 south / US 70 east (Kingston Pike/SR 1 west); Kingston Pike to Cumberland Avenue - Downtown | Western terminus; western end of US 11/US 70/SR 1 concurrency; SR 158 begins as a now unsigned secondary highway |
| 0.27 | 0.43 | US 129 (Alcoa Highway/SR 115) to I-40 / I-75 – Alcoa, Maryville | Partial unnumbered interchange on US 129 |
| 0.47 | 0.76 | SR 450 east (Joe Johnson Drive) – University of Tennessee | Western terminus of SR 450; Signalized intersection; primary entrance to UT agriculture campus |
| 1.75 | 2.82 | Lake Loudoun Boulevard - University of Tennessee, Thompson–Boling Arena, Neyland Stadium | Signalized intersection; primary entrance to UT Campus |
| 2.57 | 4.14 | Walnut Street - Knoxville Civic Coliseum, William Blount Mansion, James White Fort | Intersection with exit to Tennessee Riverboat Landing |
| 2.68 | 4.31 | Volunteer Landing | Eastbound exit only; western end of freeway; SR 158 becomes a signed primary highway |
| 2.72– 3.35 | 4.38– 5.39 | SR 71 south (James White Parkway) US 11 north / US 70 east (Hall of Fame Drive/SR 1 east/SR 71 north) | Eastern end of US 11/US 70/SR 1 concurrency |
| 3.18 | 5.12 | Cumberland Avenue to US 441 - Downtown | Westbound exit and eastbound entrance from Main Street |
| 3.42 | 5.50 | Summit Hill Drive | Westbound exit and eastbound entrance from Hall of Fame Drive (US 11/US 70/SR 1/SR 71) |
| 3.68– 4.63 | 5.92– 7.45 | I-40 – Nashville, Asheville | Eastern terminus; I-40 exit 388A; semi-directional T interchange |
1.000 mi = 1.609 km; 1.000 km = 0.621 mi: Concurrency terminus; Incomplete access
