= Tallassee, Tennessee =

Tallassee
- Unincorporated community
- Location within Tennessee Location within the United States
- Coordinates: 35°32′48″N 84°03′36″W
- Country: United States
- State: Tennessee
- County: Blount
- Elevation: 820 ft (250 m)
- Time zone: UTC-5 (Eastern (EST))
  - Summer (DST): UTC-4 (EDT)
- ZIP code: 37878
- Area code: 865
- GNIS feature ID: 1272049

Tallassee is an unincorporated community in Blount County, Tennessee. Its ZIP code is 37878.

Tallassee is located along U.S. Route 129 (Calderwood Highway) approximately a half mile west of Chilhowee Dam along the banks of the Little Tennessee River.
