= Eagleton Village, Tennessee =

Eagleton Village
- CDP
- Interactive map of Eagleton Village
- Coordinates: 35°47′17″N 83°56′10″W
- Country: United States
- State: Tennessee
- County: Blount

Area
  - Total: 3.03 sq mi (7.86 km^{2})
  - Land: 3.03 sq mi (7.86 km^{2})
  - Water: 0 sq mi (0.00 km^{2})
- Elevation: 1,024 ft (312 m)

Population (2020)
  - Total: 5,393
  - Density: 1,776.9/sq mi (686.06/km^{2})
- Time zone: UTC-5 (Eastern (EST))
  - Summer (DST): UTC-4 (EDT)
- ZIP code: 37804
- Area code: 865
- FIPS code: 47-22340
- GNIS feature ID: 2402420

Eagleton Village is a census-designated place (CDP) in Blount County, Tennessee. The population was 5,393 at the 2020 census. It is included in the Knoxville, Tennessee Metropolitan Statistical Area. The community is named after the first Eagleton School, built in the 1800s on land donated by Scottish immigrant David Eagleton (1748–1828). Urbanization began during World War II, driven by the arrival of workers for the local ALCOA plant.

== Geography ==
According to the United States Census Bureau, the CDP has a total area of 3.2 square miles (8.3 km^{2}), all land.

== Demographics ==
Historical population
Census	Pop.	Note	%±
2010	5,052		—
2020	5,393		6.7%
U.S. Decennial Census

=== 2020 census ===
Eagleton Village racial composition
Race	Number	Percentage
White (non-Hispanic)	4,440	82.33%
Black or African American (non-Hispanic)	140	2.6%
Native American	12	0.22%
Asian	38	0.7%
Other/Mixed	233	4.32%
Hispanic or Latino	530	9.83%

As of the 2020 United States census, there were 5,393 people, 2,302 households, and 1,563 families residing in the CDP.

=== 2000 census ===
As of the census of 2000, there were 4,883 people, 2,133 households, and 1,426 families residing in the CDP. The population density was 1,524.5 inhabitants per square mile (588.6/km^{2}). There were 2,291 housing units at an average density of 715.2 per square mile (276.1/km^{2}). The racial makeup of the CDP was 95.97% White, 2.23% African American, 0.31% Native American, 0.45% Asian, 0.25% from other races, and 0.80% from two or more races. Hispanic or Latino of any race were 1.11% of the population.

There were 2,133 households, out of which 28.6% had children under the age of 18 living with them, 50.0% were married couples living together, 12.5% had a female householder with no husband present, and 33.1% were non-families. 29.8% of all households were made up of individuals, and 13.2% had someone living alone who was 65 years of age or older. The average household size was 2.28 and the average family size was 2.79.

In the CDP, the population was spread out, with 22.3% under the age of 18, 7.8% from 18 to 24, 30.3% from 25 to 44, 22.9% from 45 to 64, and 16.7% who were 65 years of age or older. The median age was 38 years. For every 100 females, there were 87.3 males. For every 100 females age 18 and over, there were 84.4 males.

The median income for a household in the CDP was $29,888, and the median income for a family was $34,487. Males had a median income of $26,754 versus $22,431 for females. The per capita income for the CDP was $17,870. About 9.6% of families and 13.1% of the population were below the poverty line, including 20.3% of those under age 18 and 8.3% of those age 65 or over.
