= Friendsville, Tennessee =

Friendsville
- City
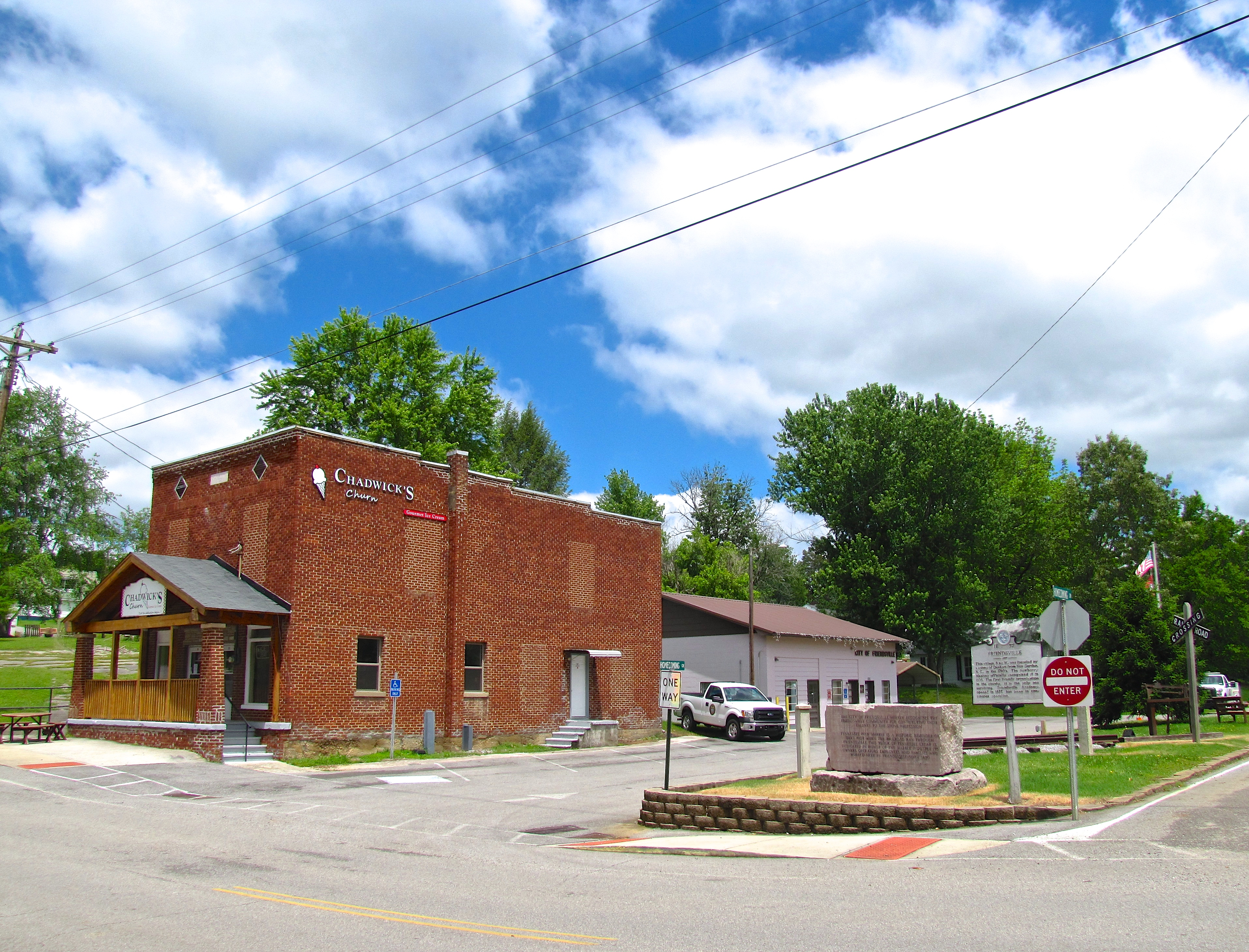
- Friendsville

- Seal

- Location of Friendsville in Blount County, Tennessee.
- Coordinates: 35°45′23″N 84°07′55″W
- Country: United States
- State: Tennessee
- County: Blount
- Settled: 1790s
- Incorporated: 1953
- Named for: Friends Church (Quakers)

Government

Area
  - Total: 2.84 sq mi (7.35 km^{2})
  - Land: 2.84 sq mi (7.35 km^{2})
  - Water: 0 sq mi (0.00 km^{2})
- Elevation: 840 ft (260 m)

Population (2020)
  - Total: 896
  - Density: 315.7/sq mi (121.89/km^{2})
- Time zone: UTC-5 (Eastern (EST))
  - Summer (DST): UTC-4 (EDT)
- ZIP code: 37737
- Area code: 865
- FIPS code: 47-28060
- GNIS feature ID: 2403666
- Website: https://www.friendsvilletn.gov/

Friendsville is a city in Blount County, Tennessee. Its population was 896 at the 2020 census. It is included in the Knoxville, Tennessee Metropolitan Statistical Area.

== History ==
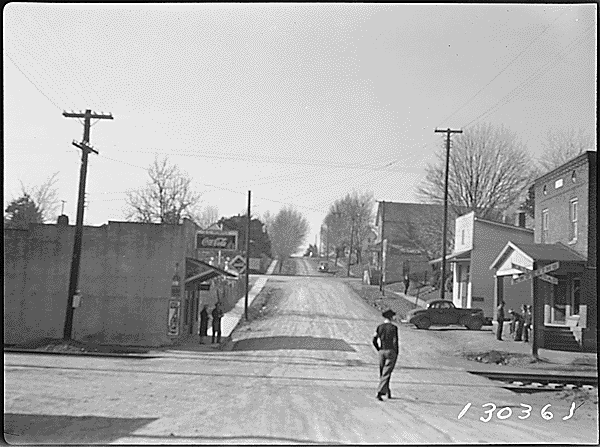
Friendsville in 1942

Friendsville was founded by Quakers from New Garden, North Carolina, who settled in the area in the 1790s. The town is still home to a Friends Meetinghouse. In 1854, a group of British Quaker elders stayed here while promoting the abolitionist cause with American leaders. During this visit, abolitionist leader William Forster died and was buried here.

In the 19th century, the Quakers wielded considerable influence in Blount County, and were partially responsible for the abolitionist movements arising in the county in the years leading up to the Civil War. Along with nearby Greenback and possibly Cades Cove, Friendsville provided a stop on the Underground Railroad. A cave (since filled in) near the Friends Meetinghouse was stocked with provisions by Quakers such as William J. Hackney to provide a stopover for fugitive slaves and later soldiers en route to join the Union army.

=== Friendsville today ===
K-5 education in Friendsville is provided by Friendsville Elementary School (part of Blount County Schools), which was once Friendsville High School. Boat launch facilities along Fort Loudoun Lake can be found at Gallahar Creek and Whispering Cove.

Friendsville is home to the Pellissippi State Community College, Blount County Campus.

== Geography ==
Friendsville is located in western Blount County. The town is situated along State Route 333 (Miser Station Road) and stretches from Fort Loudoun Lake in the north to U.S. Route 321 (Lamar Alexander Parkway). It lies at an elevation of 879 feet (268 m).

According to the United States Census Bureau, the city has a total area of 3.0 square miles (7.8 km^{2}), all land.

== Demographics ==
Historical population
| Census | Pop. | Note | %± |
|---|---|---|---|
| 1880 | 134 | | — |
| 1960 | 606 | | — |
| 1970 | 575 | | −5.1% |
| 1980 | 694 | | 20.7% |
| 1990 | 792 | | 14.1% |
| 2000 | 890 | | 12.4% |
| 2010 | 913 | | 2.6% |
| 2020 | 896 | | −1.9% |

=== 2020 census ===
As of the 2020 census, Friendsville had a population of 896. The median age was 48.0 years. 16.4% of residents were under the age of 18 and 22.2% of residents were 65 years of age or older. For every 100 females there were 104.1 males, and for every 100 females age 18 and over there were 105.8 males.

0.0% of residents lived in urban areas, while 100.0% lived in rural areas.

Racial composition as of the 2020 census
| Race | Number | Percent |
|---|---|---|
| White | 832 | 92.9% |
| Black or African American | 1 | 0.1% |
| American Indian and Alaska Native | 5 | 0.6% |
| Asian | 0 | 0.0% |
| Native Hawaiian and Other Pacific Islander | 0 | 0.0% |
| Some other race | 2 | 0.2% |
| Two or more races | 56 | 6.2% |
| Hispanic or Latino (of any race) | 21 | 2.3% |

There were 383 households in Friendsville, of which 27.7% had children under the age of 18 living in them. Of all households, 53.5% were married-couple households, 19.1% were households with a male householder and no spouse or partner present, and 19.8% were households with a female householder and no spouse or partner present. About 27.5% of all households were made up of individuals and 12.0% had someone living alone who was 65 years of age or older.

There were 397 housing units, of which 3.5% were vacant. The homeowner vacancy rate was 0.0% and the rental vacancy rate was 0.0%.

=== 2000 census ===
As of the census of 2000, there was a population of 890, with 362 households and 271 families residing in the city. The population density was 281.3 inhabitants per square mile (108.6/km^{2}). There were 395 housing units at an average density of 124.8 per square mile (48.2/km^{2}). The racial makeup of the city was 97.42% White, 0.22% African American, 0.90% Native American, 0.90% Asian, and 0.56% from two or more races. Hispanic or Latino of any race were 1.01% of the population.

There were 362 households, out of which 30.7% had children under the age of 18 living with them, 64.1% were married couples living together, 7.7% had a female householder with no husband present, and 25.1% were non-families. 22.7% of all households were made up of individuals, and 11.0% had someone living alone who was 65 years of age or older. The average household size was 2.46 and the average family size was 2.89.

In the city the population was spread out, with 22.1% under the age of 18, 7.3% from 18 to 24, 29.8% from 25 to 44, 26.4% from 45 to 64, and 14.4% who were 65 years of age or older. The median age was 40 years. For every 100 females, there were 100.9 males. For every 100 females age 18 and over, there were 99.1 males.

The median income for a household in the city was $40,833, and the median income for a family was $48,000. Males had a median income of $32,232 versus $26,382 for females. The per capita income for the city was $16,871. About 5.0% of families and 7.1% of the population were below the poverty line, including 8.9% of those under age 18 and 9.7% of those age 65 or over.
