= Boomsday =

Discontinued annual fireworks celebration

Coordinates: 35.957°N 83.918°W

- Boomsday 2007 logo

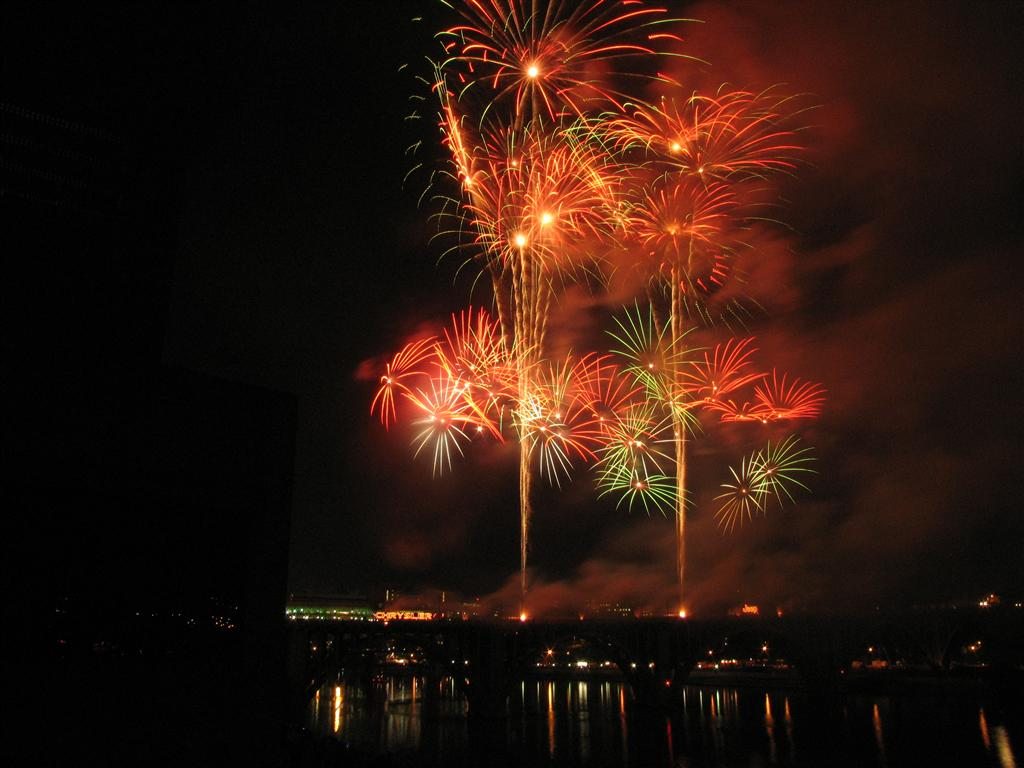
- Grand finale of the 2008 Boomsday event
- Genre: Firework show
- Date: Labor Day weekend
- Frequency: Annual
- Locations: Volunteer Landing, downtown Knoxville, Tennessee
- Years active: 1987–2015
- Inaugurated: 1987; 39 years ago
- Most recent: 2015
- Attendance: 325,000

Boomsday was an annual fireworks celebration that took place on Labor Day weekend in Knoxville, Tennessee. It was the largest Labor Day firework show in the United States, and was considered a top attraction in the region. The event was held on Volunteer Landing and accompanied by live music and festivities.

Boomsday's firework display attracted over 325,000 spectators every year. Fireworks were set off from the Henley Street Bridge (to a lesser extent Baptist Hospital and the Gay Street Bridge) and spectators could view the show from the riverfront, hillsides, or on boats from the Tennessee River. In 2006, Boomsday was expanded to a three-day event lasting through Labor Day weekend, causing Knoxville to lose money, and the city reverted to the one-day event in 2007. The fireworks display was choreographed to music with one such selection being Madonna's Lucky Star in which all the bursts were star shaped. The Tennessee Volunteer's fight song with the bursts being the team's colors bursting in front of Neyland Stadium was always a perennial crowd pleaser. Other musical selections included Smoke on the Water from Deep Purple, the theme from Jaws, and Born to Be Wild from Steppenwolf, just to name a few. The "waterfall" on the Henley Street Bridge marked the second half of the show.

In July 2015, organizers announced that 2015 would be the final Boomsday, stating that the city loses approximately $100,000 per year hosting the event.

== Gallery ==
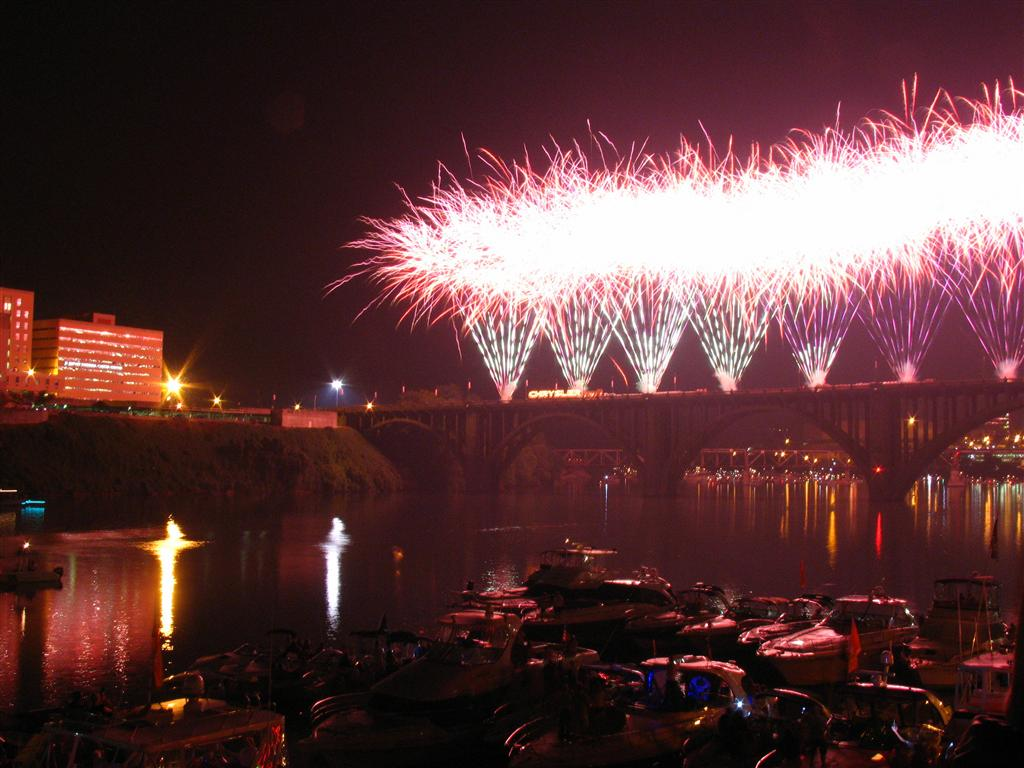
View from Calhoun's, 2007

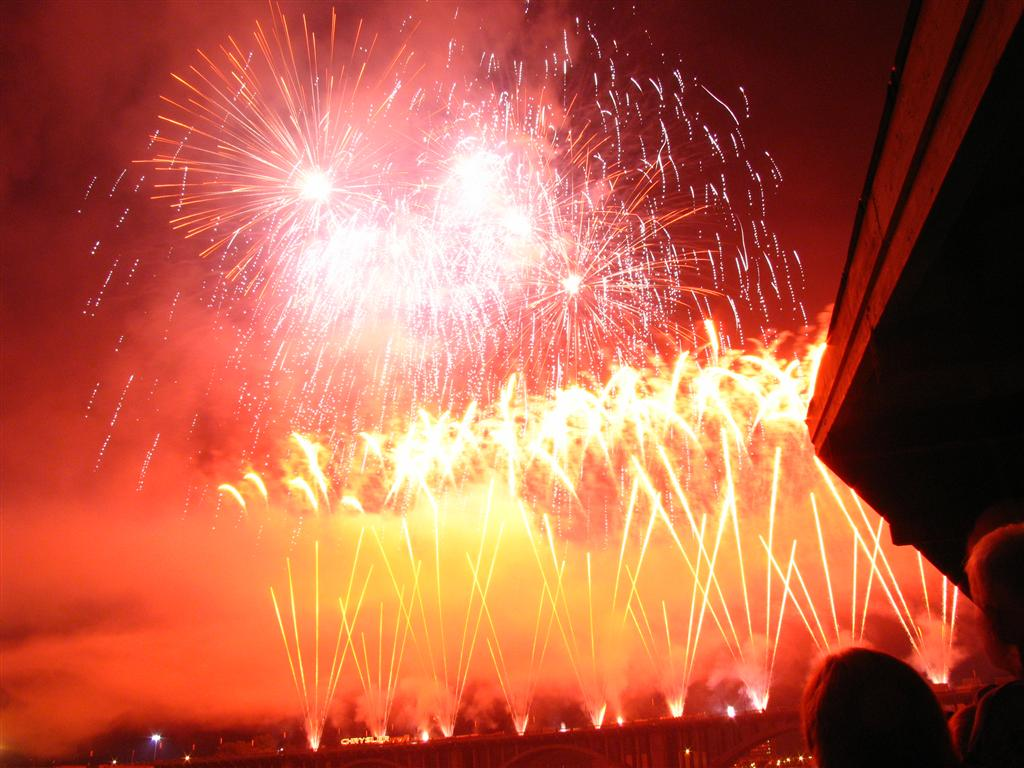
Orange and white, colors of the Tennessee Volunteers

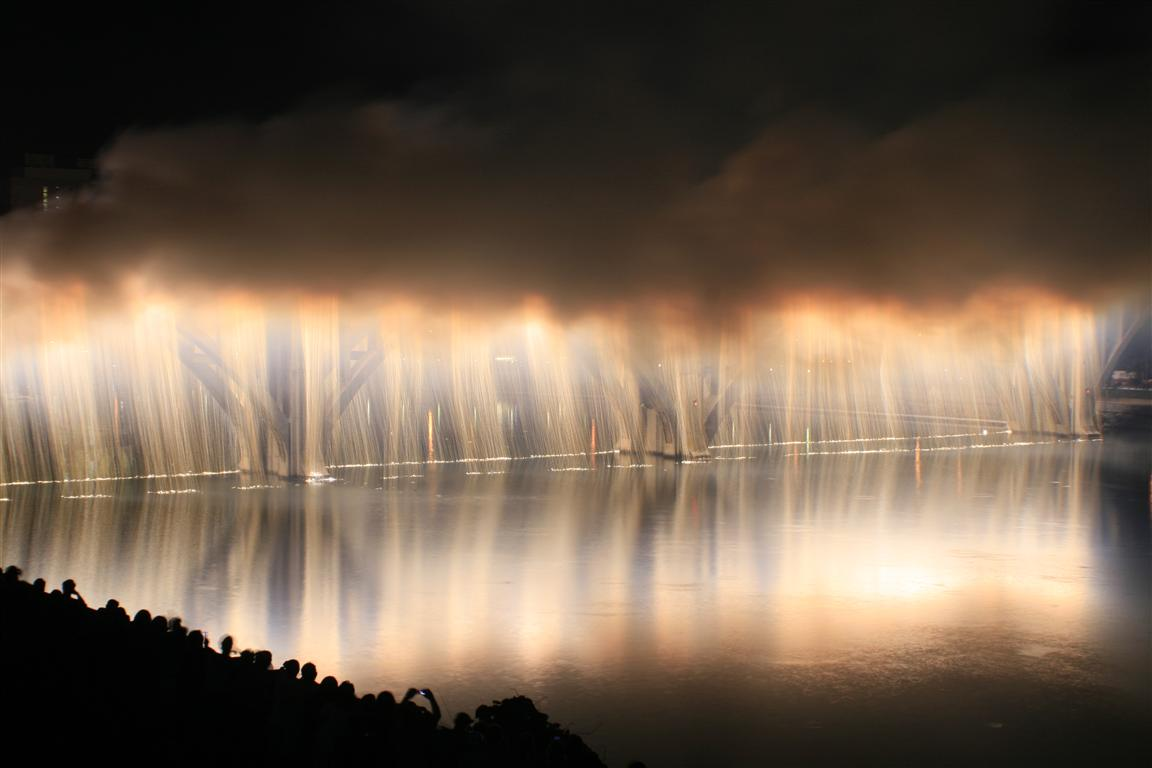
"Waterfall" from the Henley Street Bridge

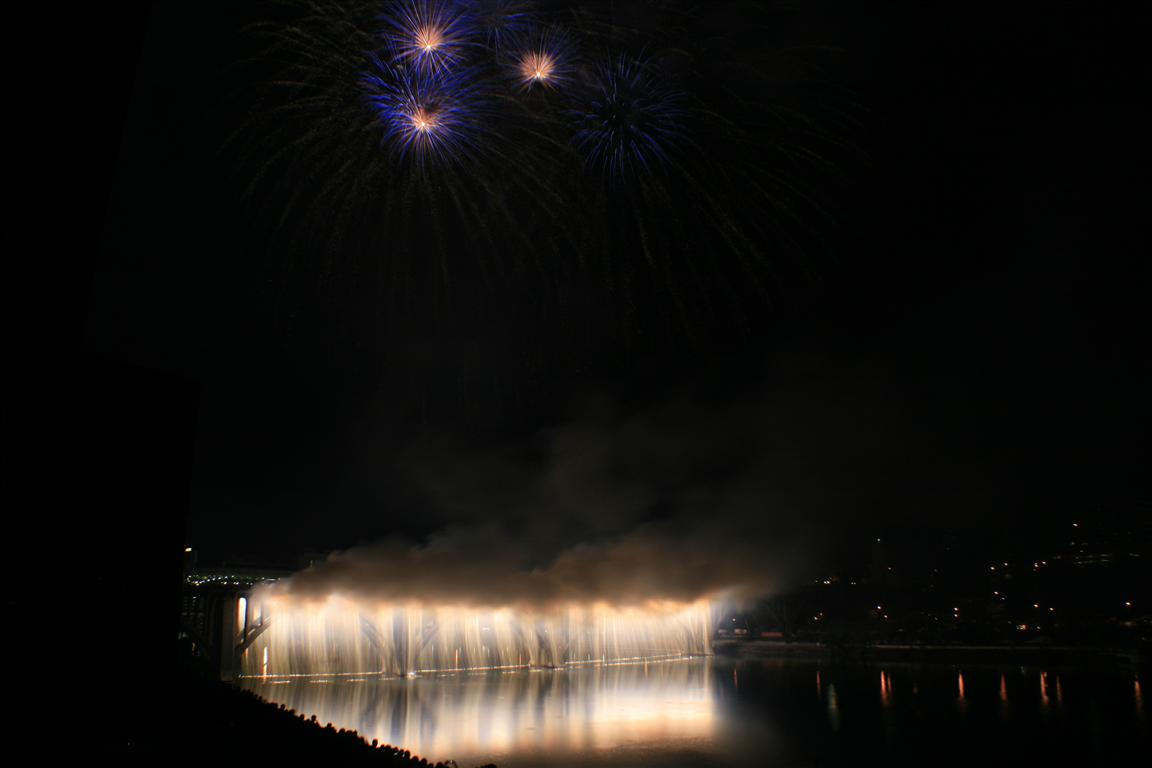
Waterfall with extra bursts

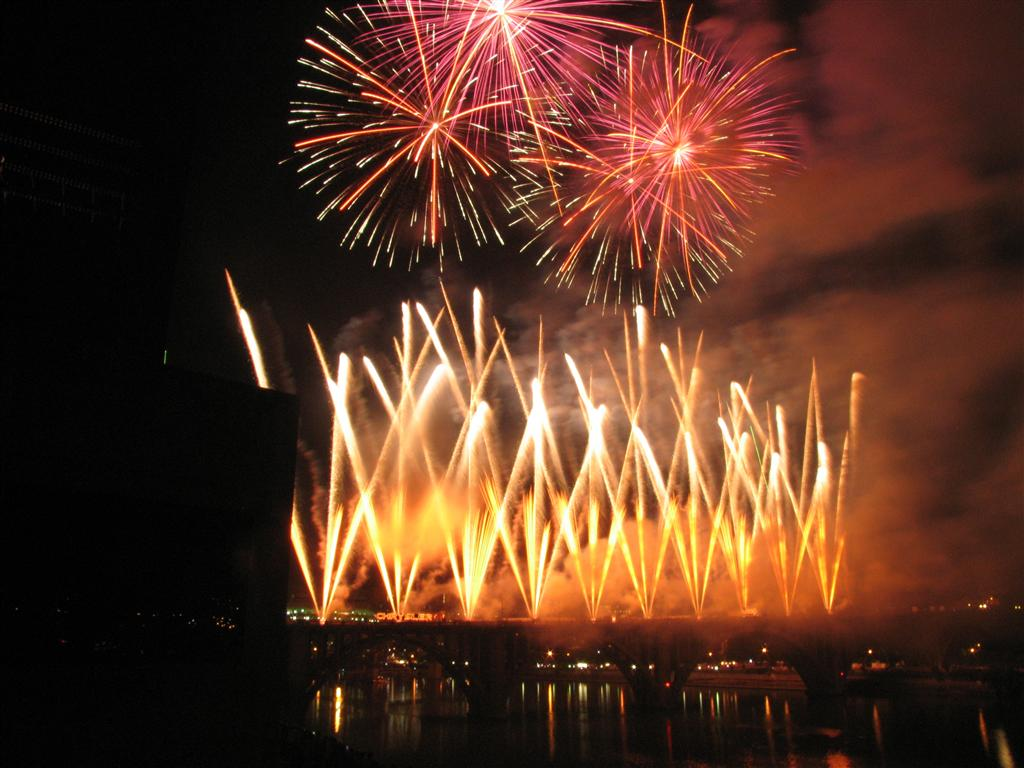
2008

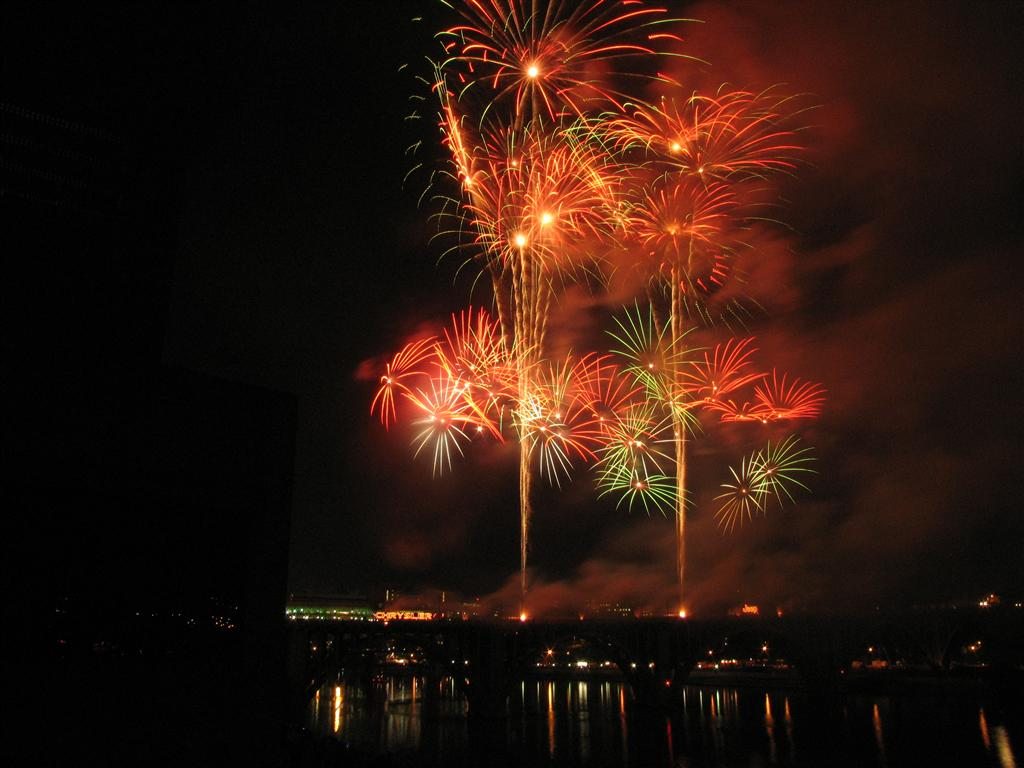
Grand Finale, 2008
