= Gay Street (Knoxville) =

- Gay Street Commercial Historic District
- U.S. National Register of Historic Places
- U.S. Historic district
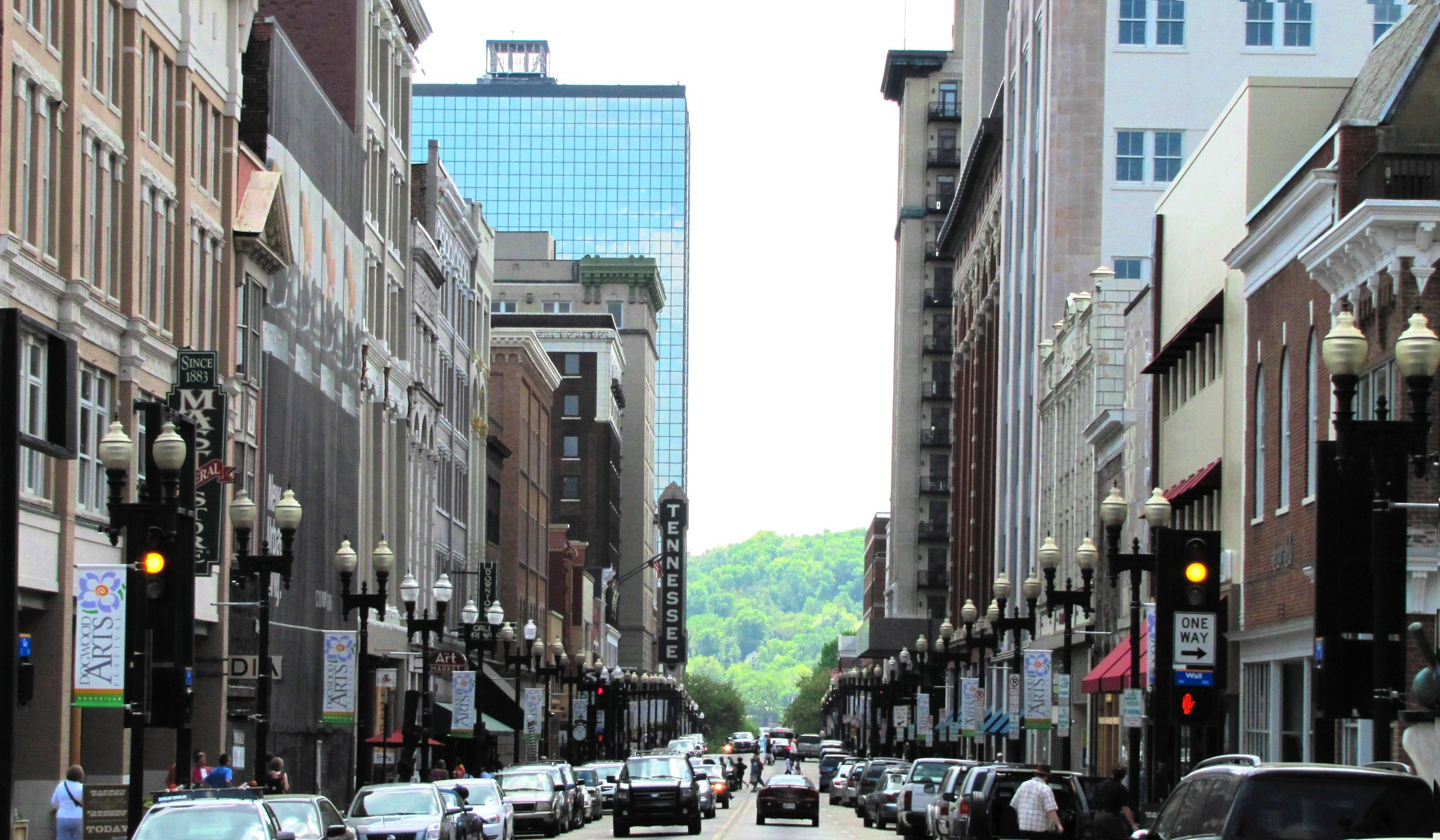
- Gay Street, looking south from Wall Avenue

- Location within Tennessee Location within the United States
- Location: Roughly along Gay Street from Summit Hill Drive to Church Avenue; Knoxville, Tennessee
- Coordinates: 35°57′56″N 83°55′6″W
- Area: approximately 13 acres (5.3 ha)
- Built: 1870–1938
- Architect: Baumann & Baumann, R. F. Graf, Cal Johnson, John Kevan Peebles; multiple
- Architectural style: Classical Revival, Vernacular Commercial, Italianate Commercial, Art Deco, Romanesque Revival, Second Renaissance Revival
- NRHP reference No.: 86002912
- Added to NRHP: November 4, 1986

Gay Street is a street in Knoxville, Tennessee, United States, that traverses the heart of the city's downtown area. Since its development in the 1790s, Gay Street has served as the city's principal financial and commercial thoroughfare, and has played a primary role in the city's historical and cultural development. The street contains Knoxville's largest office buildings and oldest commercial structures. Several buildings on Gay Street have been listed on the National Register of Historic Places.

Part of Charles McClung's original 1791 plat of Knoxville, Gay Street was a focal point for the early political activity of both the city as well as the State of Tennessee. By 1850, Gay Street was home to three-fourths of Knoxville's commercial activity, and in 1854, the street became Knoxville's first paved road. On the eve of the Civil War, Gay Street was the site of simultaneous Union and Confederate recruiting rallies. After the war, Gay Street saw extensive commercial development as railroad construction brought an industrial boom to Knoxville.

Gay Street and events that took place on Gay Street have been mentioned in the works of James Agee, Cormac McCarthy, Mark Twain, and George Washington Harris. Cultural institutions established along Gay Street include the Lawson McGhee Library (1886), the Bijou Theatre (1909), the Riviera Theatre (1920), the Tennessee Theatre (1928), and the East Tennessee History Center (2004). The Knoxville Journal, Knoxville Whig, and Knoxville Register were all once headquartered on Gay Street, and radio stations WNOX and WROL both broadcast from Gay Street at various times during the 20th century.

== Route and landmarks ==
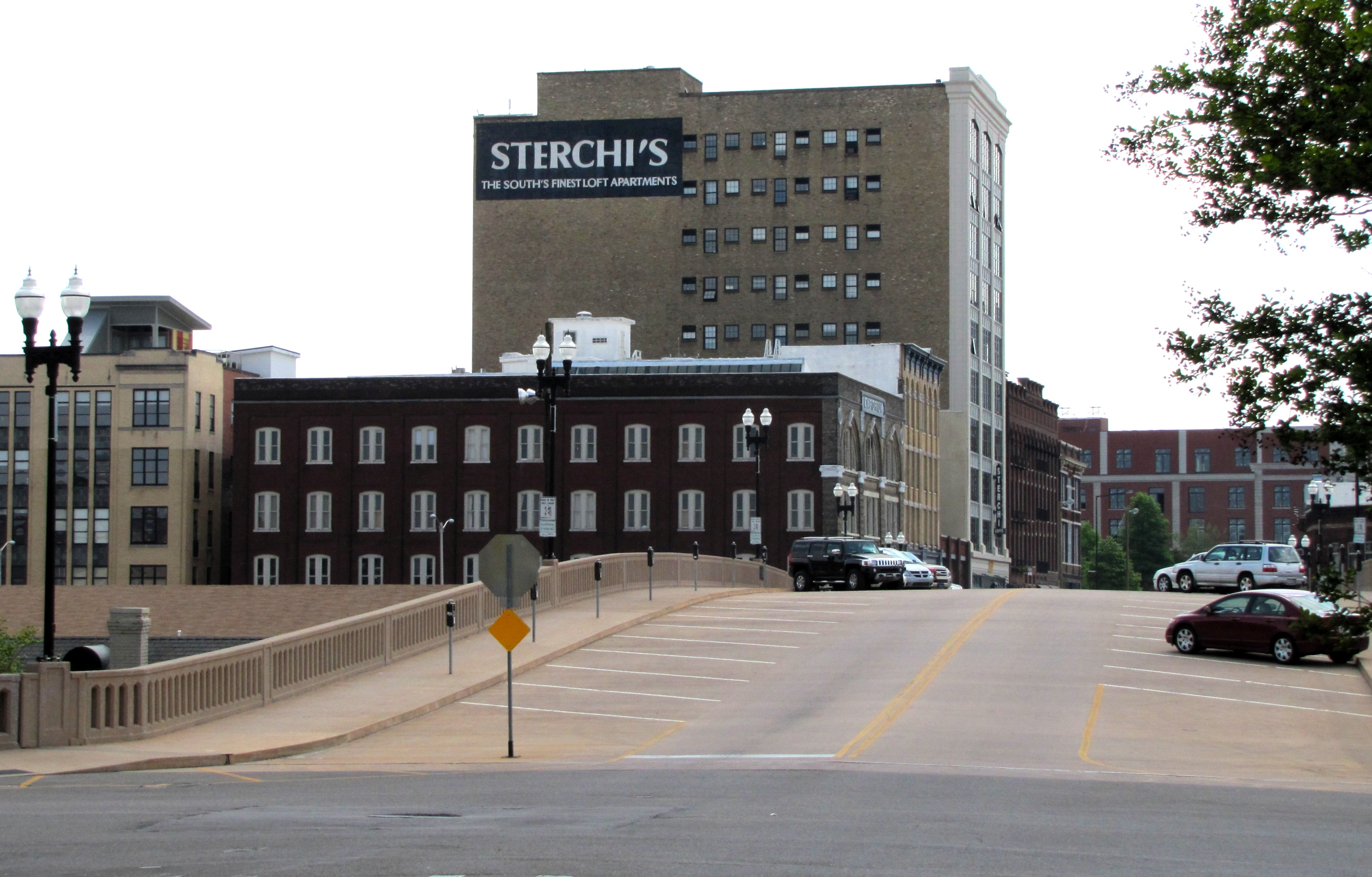
Looking south across the Gay Street Viaduct, with the 100-block of South Gay rising on the other side

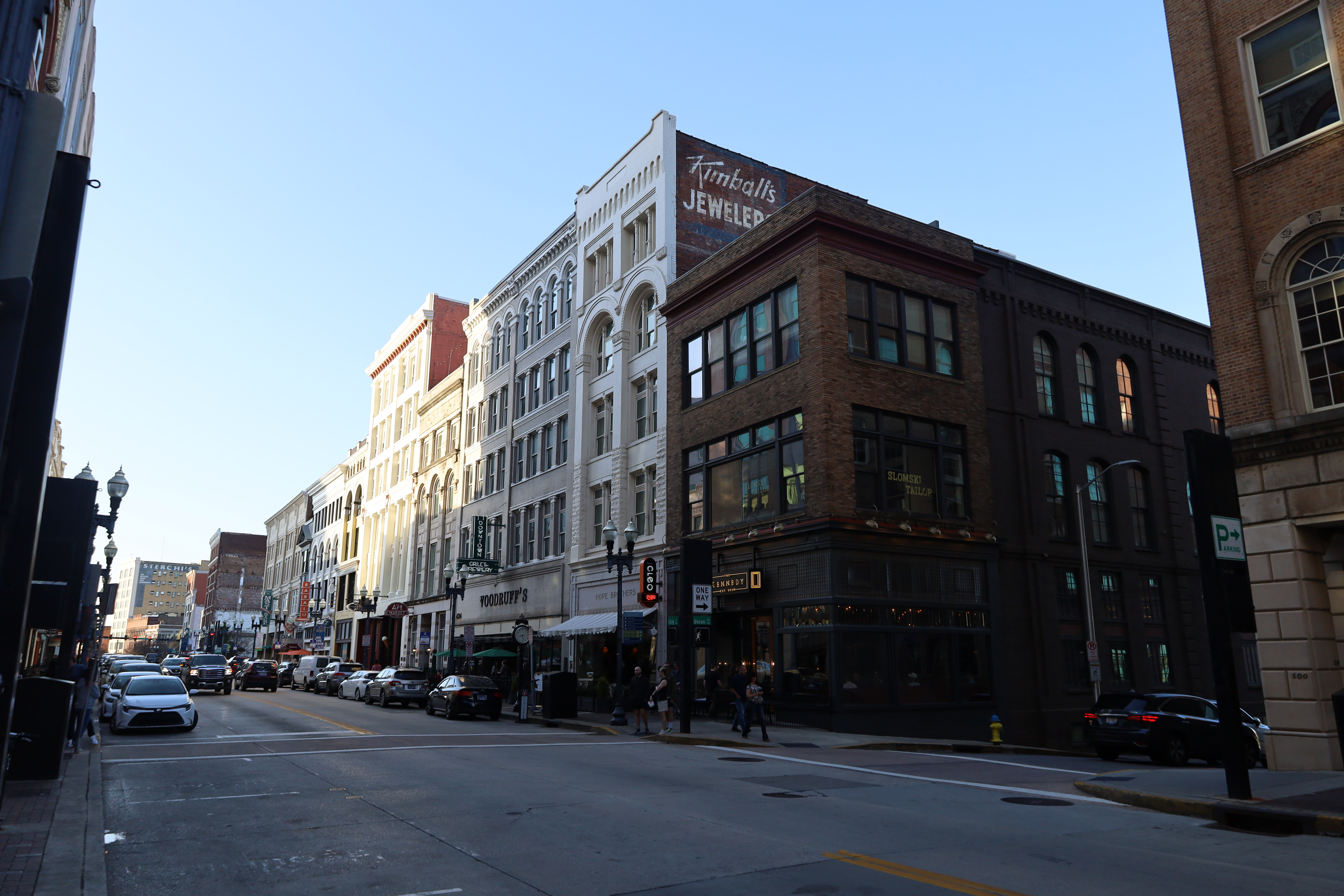
Buildings on the 400 south block of the historic district in 2025

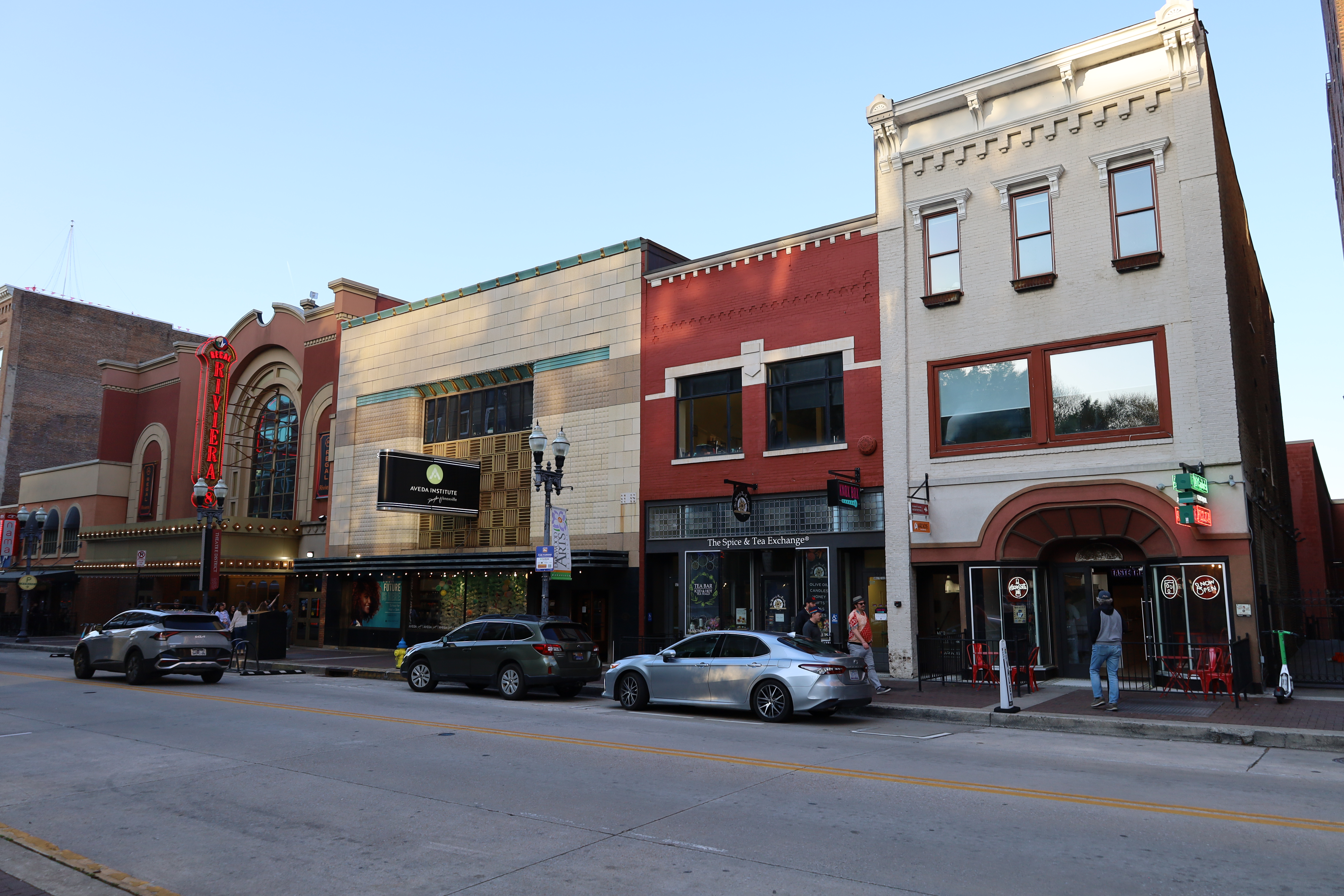
Buildings on the 500 south block of the historic district in 2025

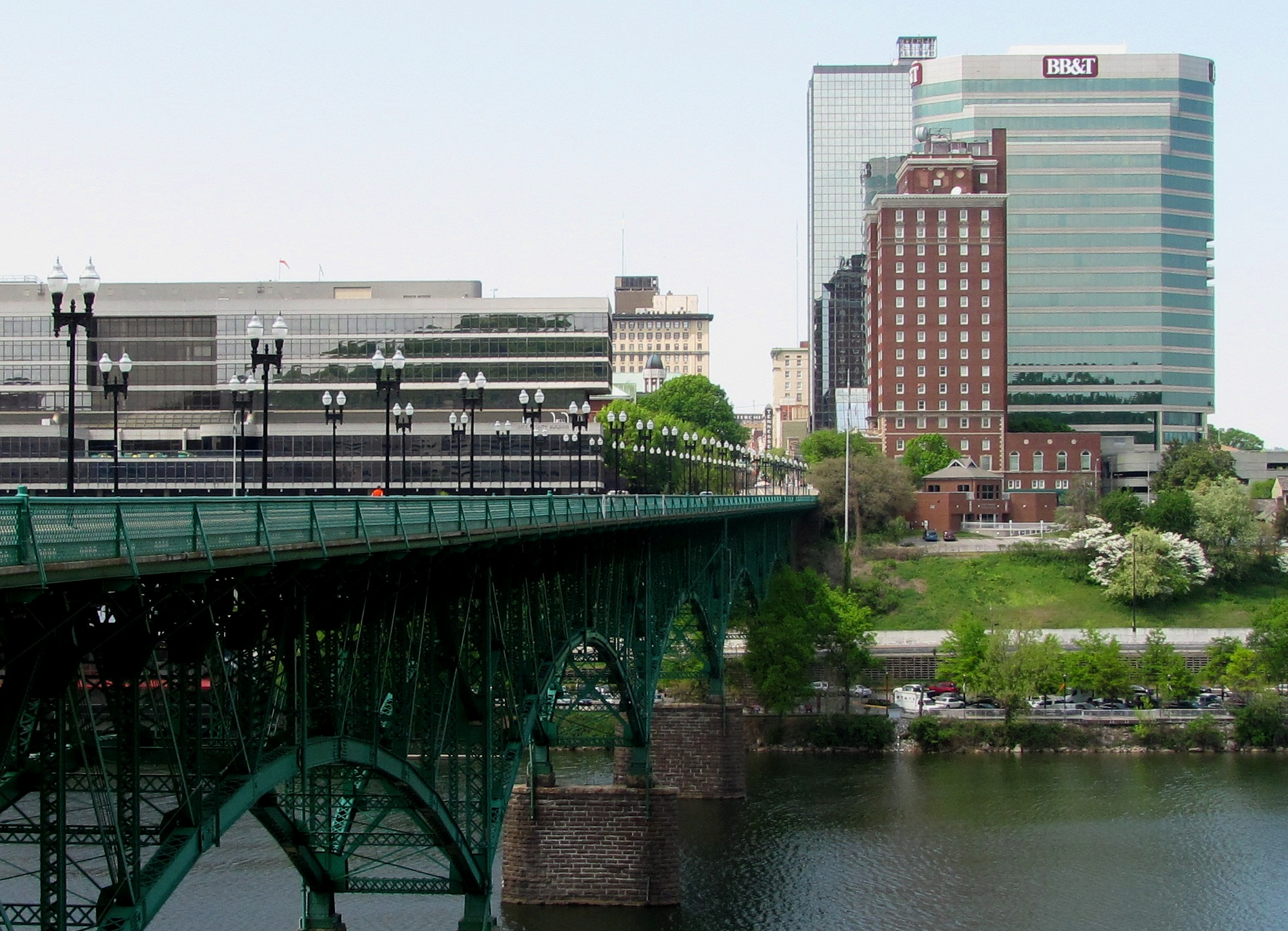
View of the Gay Street Bridge and buildings on the 800 and 900 blocks of South Gay

Gay Street runs for about a mile-and-a-half from its northern terminus at Emory Place to its southern terminus at its intersection with Sevier Avenue and Blount Avenue on the south side of the Tennessee River. The road is divided into North Gay and South Gay by the tracks of the Southern Railway, with South Gay being the older and more densely developed half.

From north to south:

- 500 block, North Gay, from Emory Place to West Fifth Avenue— this section of Gay Street traverses the Emory Place Historic District, and intersects Emory Place a block east of Broadway, opposite Old Gray Cemetery. First Christian Church and St. John's Lutheran Church lie adjacent to this section of Gay, although they have Fifth Avenue and Broadway addresses, respectively.
- 400 block, North Gay, from West Fifth to West Magnolia.
- From West Magnolia to East Magnolia, North Gay passes under Interstate 40. The area under the interstate is used for parking space.
- 300 block, North Gay, from East Magnolia to West Depot Avenue. This section of Gay Street is part of a merged stretch of U.S. Route 70, U.S. Route 11, and State Route 1, which joins Gay Street from the east via Magnolia and diverges from Gay to the west via Depot. Regas Restaurant dominates the eastern half of this block.
- The Gay Street Viaduct, which crosses the Southern Railway tracks. The tracks comprise a large railyard that occupies a natural declivity about 15 feet (4.6 m) below street level. From the viaduct, there is a sweeping view of the Old City to the east and the Jackson Avenue warehouses to the south. The Southern Railroad Terminal lies along the tracks, immediately east of the viaduct.
- 100 block, South Gay, from Jackson Avenue to Vine Avenue. This section of Gay Street is part of the Southern Terminal and Warehouse Historic District. Notable buildings include the 10-story Sterchi Lofts building, the Emporium, and the Commerce Building.
- 125 block, South Gay, Hollywood Studios Photos.
- 200 block, South Gay, from Vine Avenue to Summit Hill Drive.
- 300 block, South Gay, from Summit Hill Drive to Wall Avenue; this is the northernmost block of the Gay Street Commercial Historic District, which stretches along South Gay from Summit Hill to Church Avenue. Notable buildings on this block include the five-story Century Building and the Knoxville Visitors Center.
- 400 block, South Gay, from Wall Avenue to Union Avenue. A narrow alley divides the buildings on the western half of this block from the buildings facing Market Square to the west. Notable buildings include the Kress Building, the McNulty Building (Mast General Store), the Sanford, the seven-story Miller's department store building, the Chamberlain and Albers Company Building (Tailor Lofts), and the Woodruff Building. Many of the buildings on this block were built in the wake of the so-called "Million Dollar Fire," which destroyed almost the entire east side of the 400 block on April 8, 1897.
- 500 block, South Gay, from Union Avenue to Clinch Avenue. The western half of this block adjoins Krutch Park. Notable buildings include the Fidelity Building, the Riviera Theatre, the S & W Cafeteria, the Farragut Hotel building, and The Holston.
- 600 block, South Gay, from Clinch Avenue to Church Avenue. This is the southernmost block in the Gay Street Commercial Historic District. Notable buildings include the Tennessee Theatre, the Mechanics' Bank building, and the Journal Arcade. "The Oarsman," a sculpture created in 1988 by David Phelps, stands at the corner of Church and Gay.
- 700 block, South Gay, from Church Avenue to Cumberland Avenue. The western half of this block is a parking lot.
- 800 block, South Gay, from Cumberland Avenue to Main Street. The First Tennessee Plaza, Knoxville's tallest building, occupies the entire eastern half of this block. The Bijou Theatre, Knoxville's oldest commercial structure, occupies the western half.
- 900 block, South Gay, from Main to Hill Avenue. The Riverview Tower and Andrew Johnson Building occupy the eastern half of this block, and the Knox County Courthouse (which faces Main) occupies the western half. The City-County Building dominates the southwest corner of the Gay/Hill intersection. The visitor center for Blount Mansion stands at the southeast corner.
- The Gay Street Bridge, a 1,512-foot (461 m) steel truss bridge that crosses the Tennessee River. The bridge passes over Neyland Drive (part of Highway 158) and the riverfront before proceeding across the river to South Knoxville.
- Intersection with Sevier and Blount avenues just across the bridge. Blount Avenue continues westward, connecting Gay with Chapman Highway. Sevier Avenue continues eastward toward the Island Home Park area.

== History ==
=== Early development ===
Gay Street was part of the original plat of Knoxville drawn up by surveyor Charles McClung in 1791. The street originally stretched from the river to what is now Church Avenue (Knoxville's original northern boundary). Within a few years, the boundary had been extended to Clinch Avenue, effectively adding what is now Gay Street's 600 block. The eastern half of this block was originally part of the land set aside by Knoxville founder James White for Blount College, the forerunner of the University of Tennessee. In its early years, Gay Street was known as "Market Street," "Broad Street," or "Court Street." The name "Gay Street," which was probably inspired by the Gay Street in Baltimore, had been applied by 1808.

The intersection of Gay and Main was the focal point of late 18th century Knoxville, with the courthouse initially located at its northwest corner and the jail located at its southeast corner. Knoxville's first store, established in 1792 by brothers Samuel and Nathaniel Cowan, was located on the northeast corner of this intersection, and the city's first major hotel the Lamar House (now part of the Bijou) was built on the southwest corner of Gay and Cumberland in 1817. On January 11, 1796, the first Tennessee state constitutional convention convened at the office of War Department agent Colonel David Henley, which was located at the corner of Gay and Church.

This early political and commercial activity on Gay Street helped the street develop into Knoxville's main thoroughfare, and by 1850, Gay Street was home to three-fourths of Knoxville's commercial activity. In 1851, the street's sidewalks were widened to 11 feet (3.4 m). Three years later, Gay Street was macadamized and paved with cobblestones. Upon completion of the railroad in 1855, Gay Street was extended still further northward to what are now the Southern Railway tracks.

=== The Civil War ===
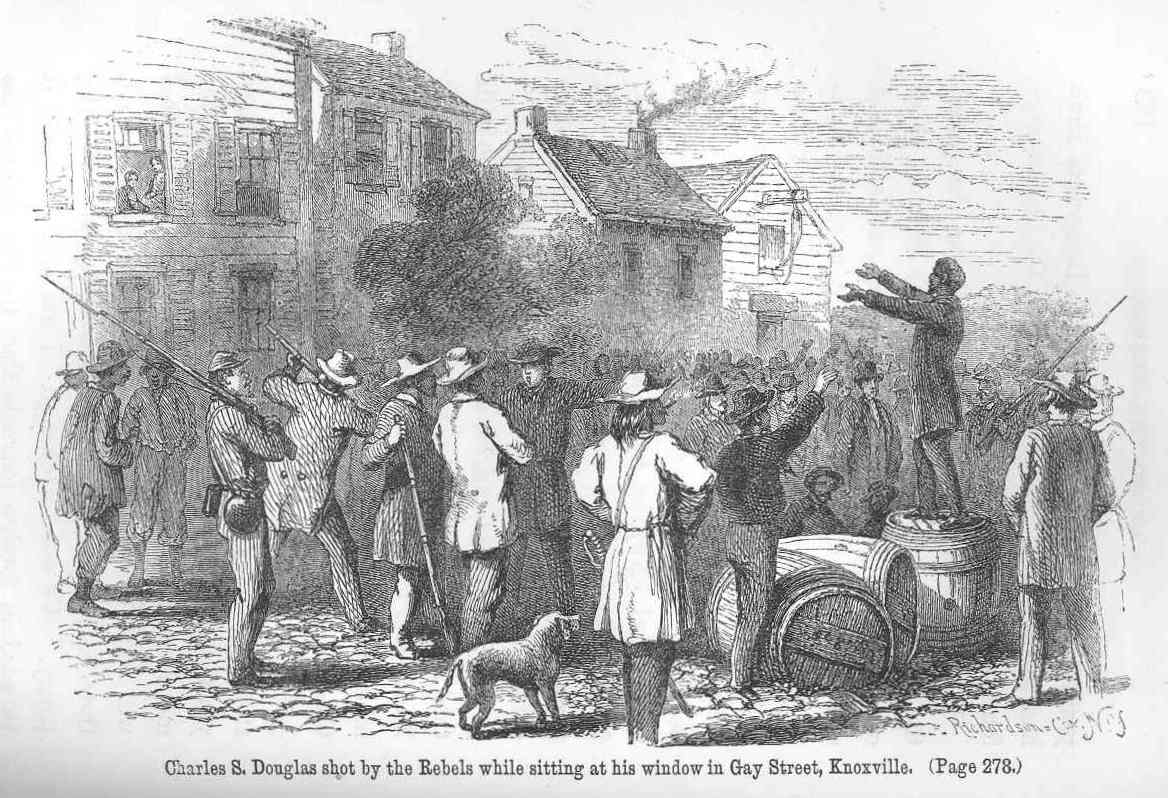
Sketch from Parson Brownlow's Book showing Confederate soldiers shooting Unionist Charles Douglas through the window of his Gay Street home in 1861

In the months leading up to the Civil War, prominent pro-Union and pro-Secession supporters spoke at Gay Street venues such as the Lamar House Hotel, while the Knoxville Whig and Knoxville Register, which were arguably the mouthpieces for East Tennessee Unionism and secessionism, respectively, were both headquartered on Gay Street. In April 1861, Union and Confederate supporters held simultaneous recruiting rallies at opposite ends of Gay Street. Future president Andrew Johnson spoke at the Union rally, and a shootout nearly erupted when several Confederate recruits attempted to interrupt his speech.

Union forces under Ambrose Burnside occupied Knoxville in September 1863, and Burnside chose as his headquarters the home of John Hervey Crozier at the corner of Gay and Clinch streets (now the location of the Farragut Hotel). Union general William P. Sanders, who was wounded in a skirmish with Confederate troops on Kingston Pike in November 1863, died at the Lamar House Hotel, which had been converted into a hospital.

=== Commercial development ===
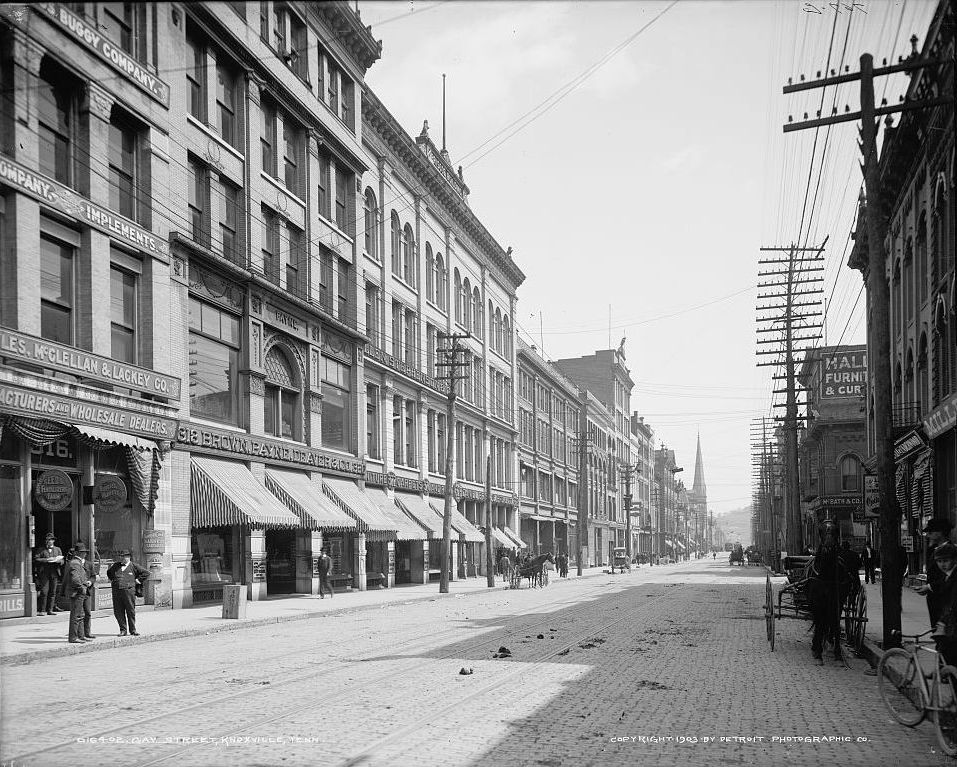
Gay Street's 300 block, circa 1903

After the Civil War, several major banks were established during Knoxville's post-Civil War commercial boom, including Mechanics' National Bank (1882) and Holston National Bank (1890), both of which would eventually build headquarters that still stand on Gay Street. After the Great Depression, Hamilton National Bank (operating out of the Holston building) grew to become the dominant bank in East Tennessee. In the 1970s, this bank was seized by United American Bank president Jake Butcher, who built the Plaza and Riverview towers before being indicted for bank fraud in the 1980s.

In the early 1830s, James Cowan (a nephew of Samuel and Nathaniel Cowan) and his brother-in-law, Perez Dickinson, opened a large general store at the corner of Gay and Main. During the 1850s, Cowan and Dickinson merged their interests with the McClung brothers (children of surveyor Charles McClung) to form the wholesaling giant, Cowan, McClung and Company. In the years following the Civil War, this company was the most profitable in Tennessee, and anchored Knoxville's powerful wholesaling sector. The company's four-story headquarters, erected on Gay Street's 500 block in 1871, was the cornerstone of what is now known as the Gay Street Commercial Historic District.

Sterchi Brothers, founded in 1888, grew to become the world's largest furniture store chain by 1930, and built its 10-story headquarters at 114 South Gay in 1925. W. W. Woodruff and Company, founded in 1865, maintained a presence on Gay Street into the late 20th century. Gay Street was home to many of Knoxville's major department stores throughout the first half of the 20th century, most notably Miller's and S. H. George's.

=== Cultural development ===
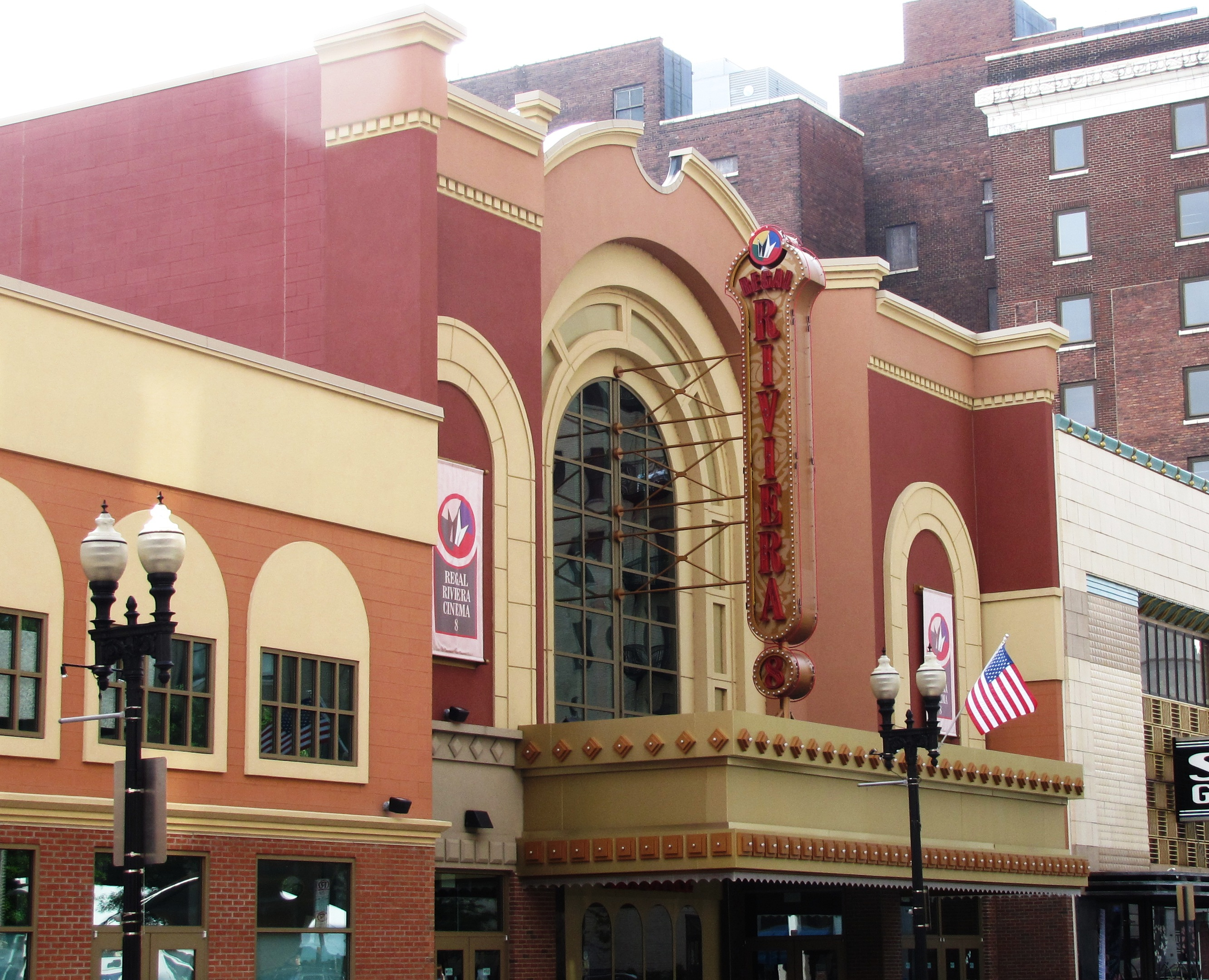
The Riviera Theatre, constructed in 1920 and renovated in 2007

Throughout most of the 19th century, the Lamar House Hotel on Gay Street was the premier gathering place for Knoxville's upper class. During the 1870s and 1880s, the hotel's masquerade balls served oysters, imported wines, and cigars, and drew the likes of artist Lloyd Branson (whose studio was also located on Gay Street) and author Frances Hodgson Burnett. By the 1930s, the Farragut Hotel (1919) and the Andrew Johnson Hotel (1929) had become Knoxville's premier hotels. Country music singer Hank Williams spent the last night of his life at the latter on New Year's Eve, 1952.

Knoxville's first major performance venue, Staub's Theatre, was built on Gay Street's 800 block in 1872, and in its early years showcased acts ranging from Payson's English Opera Troupe to vaudeville acts and wrestling matches. The Bijou Theatre, constructed as an addition to the Lamar House Hotel in 1909, would witness performances by the likes of the Marx Brothers, Dizzy Gillespie, and the Ballets Russes. In 1928, the Tennessee Theatre eclipsed the Bijou as Knoxville's major performance venue, and served as the city's first-run movie house until the 1950s.

Knoxville's two oldest radio stations, WNOX and WROL, broadcast from Gay Street during the 1920s and 1930s. WNOX featured Lowell Blanchard's Mid-Day Merry-Go-Round, initially broadcast from the Andrew Johnson Hotel, which helped launch the careers of performers such as Roy Acuff and Archie Campbell, and remained a popular noon-time radio show until the 1950s. WROL, which broadcast from the Central House Hotel (next to the Farragut), the Mechanics' Bank building, and later from a North Gay location, was best known in this period for its host, eccentric local businessman Cas Walker.

=== Structural improvements ===
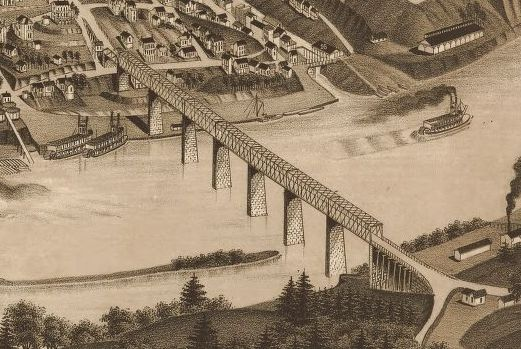
The Saulpaw bridge, the predecessor of the current Gay Street Bridge, as it appeared on an 1886 map of Knoxville

Knoxville's first permanent bridge over the Tennessee River was constructed at the south end of Gay Street in 1867, but stood for just a short time. In 1880, G. W. Saulpaw built what became known as the "Saulpaw bridge" at the site, which stood until it was replaced by the current Gay Street Bridge in 1898. At the street's north end, an iron bridge was built across the Southern Railway tracks in 1876, easing pedestrian access between the north and south sides of the tracks. The first Gay Street Viaduct across the tracks was built in 1919, and the current viaduct was built in 2005.

In 1876, the Knoxville Streetcar Company built the city's first trolley line along Gay Street. The trolleys, initially pulled by horses, were electrified by William Gibbs McAdoo in 1890. The Gay Street Bridge originally contained trolley tracks, which helped spark the development of South Knoxville, especially the Island Home Park and Vestal areas. Trolleys were a common site on Gay Street until the trolley lines were eliminated and the tracks were paved over in 1947 .

=== Decline and revitalization ===
The development of suburbs on the periphery of Knoxville in the 1950s led to the rise of suburban shopping centers, and Gay Street, which had long struggled with traffic congestion and lack of parking, began to decline as a major retail corridor. In 1955, Rich's (which had purchased S. H. George's) moved to a new location, and Miller's abandoned plans to build a new store on Gay Street's 800 block. In an attempt to revitalize the downtown area, several Knoxville businessmen formed the Downtown Knoxville Association in 1956. Following the DKA's suggestions, more parking space was created for Gay Street businesses and storefronts were renovated, but efforts to revitalize Gay Street as a major commercial corridor were largely unsuccessful.

During the 1970s and 1980s, Gay Street transitioned from a retail corridor to an office market, symbolized by the erection of the Plaza and Riverview towers, and the renovation of the Andrew Johnson Hotel as an office building. During the same period, successful efforts to save the Bijou laid the foundation for the preservation group Knox Heritage, and more focus was placed on the preservation of Gay Street's historical integrity. More recently, a number of Gay Street high-rises, including the Holston, Sterchi Lofts, and the upper levels of the Burwell, have been successfully renovated as downtown condominium space.

In 2012, the American Planning Association named Gay Street one of its top 10 "Great Streets" in America.

== Literary references ==
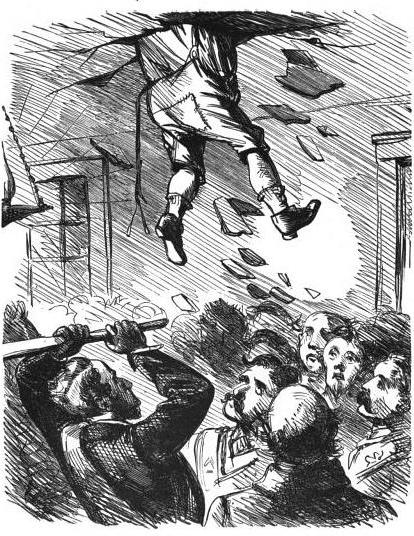
Knox County Courthouse scene from the George Washington Harris story, "Eaves-Dropping a Lodge of Free-Masons"

Humorist George Washington Harris, who lived on Gay Street during the mid-19th century and died at the Atkin Hotel on North Gay, made one of the earliest literary references to a Gay Street institution in his 1867 short story, "Eaves-Dropping a Lodge of Free-Masons." In this story, Harris's rustic protagonist, Sut Lovingood, claims that a powerful group of Freemasons once met on the second level of the Knox County Courthouse.

In his autobiography, Road Without Turning (1950), African American clergyman and activist James Herman Robinson describes an incident in which he attempted to board a bus on Gay Street, but was shoved away by the driver for not waiting for the white passengers to board first.

In the opening chapter of his Pulitzer Prize-winning novel, A Death in the Family, author James Agee recounts taking a trip with his father into downtown Knoxville in 1915 to see a movie at Gay Street's Majestic Theater. Agee remembered the theater's "exhilarating smell of stale tobacco, rank sweat, perfume and dirty drawers." He also recalled the "great bright letters" of storefront signs of various Gay Street businesses, and remembered being proud of himself for knowing how to pronounce "Sterchi."

Cormac McCarthy references Gay Street numerous times in his 1979 novel, Suttree, which is set in Knoxville in the early 1950s. Several scenes in the book take place at businesses that once existed on the street, including Miller's, Regas, the Farragut Hotel, Walgreens, the Huddle, and the hotel section of the Bijou (which he merely called "a real rat trap"). In McCarthy's 1965 novel, The Orchard Keeper, one of the main characters witnesses a temperance parade on Gay Street.

Mark Twain gave an account of the 1882 Mabry-O'Connor shootout (which took place on Gay Street's 600 block) in his book, Life on the Mississippi. More recently, the Bijou Theatre provided the inspiration for the 1974 David Madden novel, Bijou. Author Jack Mauro published a collection of Knoxville-based short stories entitled Gay Street in 2000.

== Gay Street Commercial Historic District ==
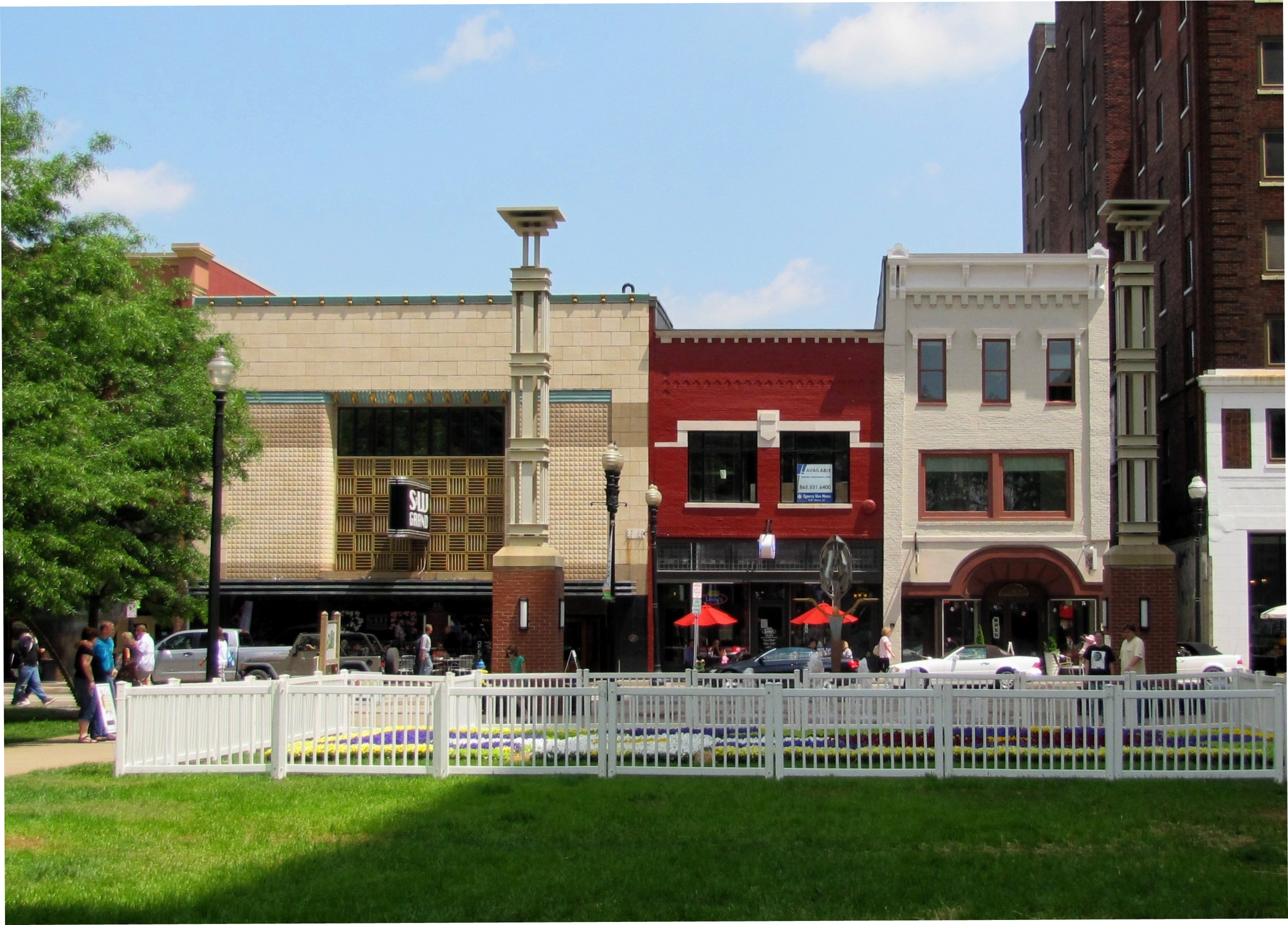
The 500 block of South Gay, viewed from Krutch Park

The Gay Street Commercial Historic District, added to the National Register in 1986, originally consisting of 35 buildings constructed circa 1880—1940 along Gay Street and adjacent side streets. The buildings range from 1890s-era wholesaling outlets to 1930s-era movie theaters. One of the buildings listed, the Fouche Block, was demolished in 1993. Another listing, the Hope Clock, was moved to West Knoxville in 2004, and was replaced by a new street clock in 2007. One notable non-contributing building is the 1905 Miller's building, which was not included due to extensive exterior modifications which have since been removed.

The Southern Terminal and most of Gay Street's 100 block were listed on the National Register as contributing properties within the Southern Terminal and Warehouses Historic District. The Andrew Johnson Hotel, the Bijou Theatre (listed as the Lamar House Hotel), and the Knox County Courthouse were all listed individually. Notable contributing properties in the Gay Street Commercial Historic District include:

- Century Building (312 South Gay), a five-story Victorian Vernacular structure built in 1898. This building is sometimes called the Haynes-Henson Building after its long-time occupant, the Haynes-Henson Shoe Company.
- McNulty Building (402 South Gay), a four-story Vernacular Commercial structure built in 1898, and named for its original occupant, McNulty Grocery and Dry Goods Company. This building is currently home to a branch of the Mast General Store.
- Gay Theater (403 South Gay), a two-story Colonial Revival-style building constructed in 1910. This building is currently home to the Lerner Lofts condominiums.
- Kress Building (417-421 South Gay), a four-story Art Deco-style structure built in 1925.
- Woodruff Building (424 South Gay), a five-story Classical Revival-style building constructed in 1905 for the hardware firm, W. W. Woodruff and Company. Woodruff's original building at this site burned in the "Million Dollar Fire" of 1897. In 1904, a dynamite explosion ripped off the facade of the second building. This building is currently home to a restaurant, the Downtown Grill and Brewery.
- Arnold, Henegar, Doyle and Company Building (428 South Gay), a five-story Victorian Commercial and Romanesque Revival-style building constructed in 1898. Arnold, Henegar, Doyle and Company was a late-19th century boot and shoe wholesaler. This building is currently home to Sapphire, a restaurant.
- Sanford, Chamberlain and Albers Company Building (430 South Gay), a three-story Vernacular Commercial-style building constructed in 1870 and modified circa 1920. The building was initially home to the drug company Sanford, Chamberlain and Albers, and later home to Szabo's tailor shop. The building is now a mixed-use building which houses one restaurant, Five Bar, and several apartments. It has since been renamed Tailor Lofts.
- Fidelity Building (500-504 South Gay), a four-story Italianate building constructed in 1871, and renovated by the architectural firm Baumann and Baumann in 1929. This building was initially home to the wholesaling firm, Cowan, McClung and Company.
- Riviera Theatre (510 South Gay), a two-story Art Deco-style theater constructed in 1920. The building was remodeled in 2007.
- S & W Cafeteria (516-518 South Gay), a two-story Art Deco-style building constructed in 1937.
- Athletic House (520 South Gay), a two-story Vernacular Commercial building constructed in 1923.
- Central House Hotel (522 South Gay), a three-story Italianate building constructed in 1875.
- Farragut Hotel (526-530 South Gay), a nine-story building with Beaux-Arts elements, constructed in 1919. The Farragut replaced the Imperial Hotel, which burned in 1916. This building is currently a condominium, and its ground floor is occupied by a restaurant, the French Market.
- The Holston (531 South Gay), a 14-story Neoclassical-style building constructed 1912-1913 for the Holston National Bank. This building is now a condominium.
- Tennessee Theatre, or the Burwell (602 South Gay), a 12-story Second Renaissance Revival building constructed in 1908. The Tennessee Theatre, which was added to the building 1928, is still used as a performance venue, while the upper floors of the building now house condominiums.

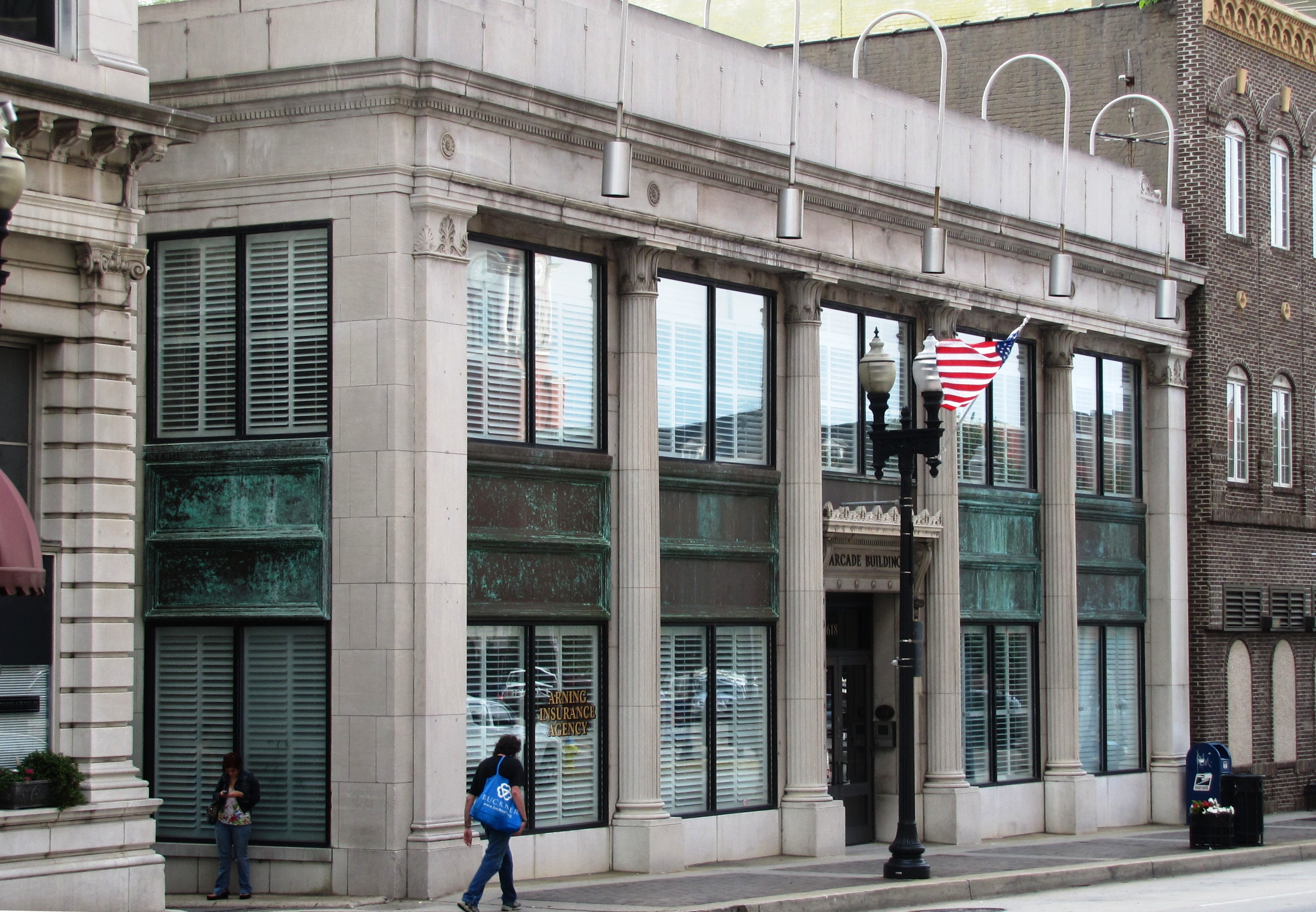
The Journal Arcade (618 South Gay), built in 1924

- Mechanics' Bank and Trust Company Building (612 South Gay), a five-story Beaux-Arts structure originally built in 1907, with two floors added in 1923.
- Journal Arcade (618-620 South Gay), a two-story Classical Revival-style building constructed in 1924, and designed by architect R. F. Graf. This building was originally the press room of the long-time Knoxville newspaper, The Knoxville Journal. Its current tenants include the Knoxville Mercury.
- Cal Johnson Building (311-313 State Street), a three-story structure built in 1898 by prominent African-American businessman, Cal Johnson (1844–1925). Johnson also operated a saloon known as the "Poplar Log" at the corner of Gay and Vine in the early 20th century.
- The Glencoe (615 State Street), a three-story Classical Revival-style building constructed in 1906. The Glencoe is now a condominium.

== See also ==
- Battle of Depot Street
- Kingston Pike
- Knoxville Riot of 1919
