= David Henley =

Continental Army officer (1749-1823)

- Born: February 5, 1749; Charlestown, Massachusetts
- Died: January 1, 1823 (aged 73) Washington, D.C.
- Branch: United States Army
- Service years: 1776–1779, 1793–1823
- Rank: Colonel
- Conflicts: American Revolutionary War

David Henley (February 5/12, 1748/9 – January 1, 1823) was a Continental Army officer during the American Revolutionary War, who served as George Washington's intelligence officer and prisoner of war commandant. He later served as the Agent for the United States Department of War for the Southwest Territory (later Tennessee) in the 1790s.

== Life and career ==
Henley was born in Charlestown, Massachusetts, the eldest child of Samuel and Elizabeth Cheever Henley. On January 8, 1776, he set fire to Charlestown which was occupied by the British. In that same year, he served a brigade-major under General William Heath, and briefly as an adjutant general under General Joseph Spencer. On January 1, 1777, he was made lieutenant colonel of the Fifth Massachusetts Regiment. He was in command at Cambridge, Massachusetts, when the troops that had been captured at Saratoga were brought there. Henley stabbed an insolent but unarmed British prisoner. Court-martial proceedings were held at Cambridge from January 20, 1778, to February 25, 1778, but he was acquitted. British General Burgoyne challenged him to a duel, which was to take place in Bermuda. He accepted the challenge, but the duel never took place.

General Washington selected him in November 1778 to be his spymaster, and charged him with compiling information to give him a snapshot of British capabilities. He largely succeeded in that task. Henley retired from the Army the following year.

In 1793, Colonel Henley was appointed by President Washington as the Agent of the Department of War for the Southwest Territory, in Knoxville, Tennessee. In this capacity, he was Superintendent of Indian Affairs, as well as quartermaster and paymaster for locally stationed troops and militia. He was known to be a hothead, but was also a strong law-and-order man. Tennessee's Constitutional Convention was held in his office at the corner of what is now Gay Street and Church Avenue in Downtown Knoxville in 1796.

He died in Washington, D.C., in 1823, while a clerk in the War Department.

== Legacy ==
In 1994, the Knoxville Federal Courthouse was proposed the site of his office. However it was later constructed at the northwest corner of Main Street and Gay Street. Both Henley Street and the Henley Street Bridge (or Henley Bridge) in Downtown Knoxville are named after him. A tablet was placed by the state of Tennessee at the location of his office in 1947.

Henley-Putnam University, a highly specialized university devoted to intelligence, security, and counterterrorism founded in 2001, is named for Henley and Israel Putnam.

== See also ==
- Intelligence in the American Revolutionary War
- Intelligence operations in the American Revolutionary War
