= Volunteer Landing =

Riverwalk and public park in Knoxville, Tennessee

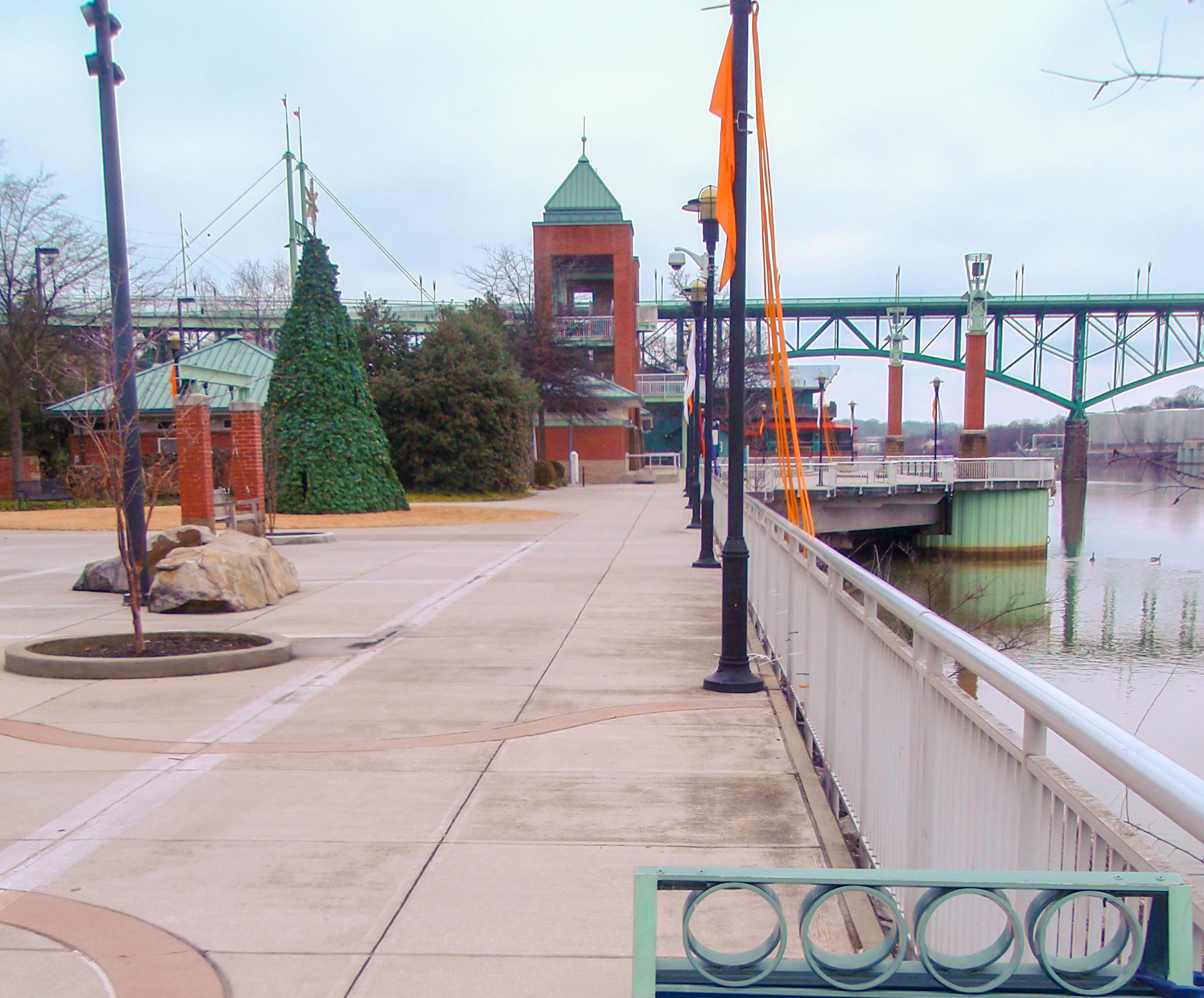
- Interactive map of Volunteer Landing
- Type: Public park, riverwalk
- Location: 300 Neyland Drive, Knoxville, Tennessee
- Coordinates: 35°57′31″N 83°55′01″W
- Created: 1997
- Owner: City of Knoxville
- Operator: Knoxville Public Building Authority
- Open: Dawn to dusk unless posted otherwise
- Public transit: KAT 10, 11, 17
- Website: Official website

Volunteer Landing is a public park and riverwalk along the Tennessee River in Knoxville, Tennessee. It is below the Gay Street Bridge.

== History ==
The location of the park is the site of the Treaty of Holston. In 1988, a 50-member waterfront task force was created to analyze the waterfront area along the Tennessee River. Per the recommendations of this task force, a three-phase project to develop Volunteer Landing began in 1995 and continued through 1996. Volunteer Landing was completed in September 1997. Upon this completion, Volunteer Landing had a boardwalk, a central pavilion and plaza, a pedestrian bridge, and two new public parks. In April 1999, Gateway Regional Visitor Center which highlighted the region's nature and technology was opened. In Spring 2000, the 140-boat slip Volunteer Landing Marina, was completed. The Regas Riverfront Tavern/Restaurant, which seated about 250 people and had a banquet facility with capacity of 300, was also completed in 2000, concluding the waterfront development project.

The state and local government contributed $10 million to Volunteer Landing. The marina was funded with about $3 million in private funds and a $100,000 Tennessee Wildlife Resources Agency (TWRA) grant. The visitor center was received $5.6 million in federal, state, and local funds. The tavern/restaurant had about $6 million of private funding. The overall cost was $42 million and consisted of both public and private developments.

In 2007, the Public Building Authority began to manage Volunteer Landing.

== Description ==
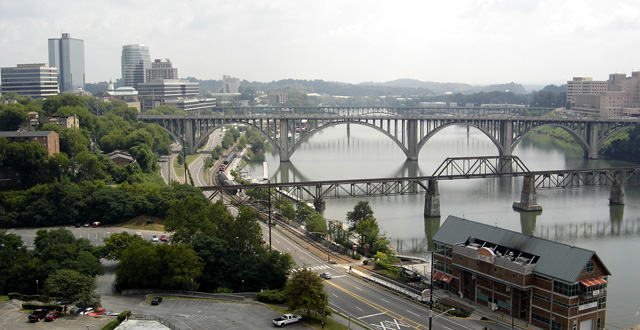
View of Volunteer Landing from Neyland Stadium showing the Three Rivers Rambler parked underneath the roadway bridges

Volunteer Landing has 13 acres (5.3 ha). Two new public parks were built as part of Volunteer Landing. One is called River Mountain Park, and it is west of the central pavilion and demonstrates the region's river and mountain heritage through the landscaping and water features. The second park is at the mouth of First Creek where the city was founded and has exhibits reflecting this history.

Volunteer Landing Park is a three-acre linear park connects James White Greenway and Neyland Greenway. They are part of the downtown greenway system which is 19 miles long and runs east to west.

== Activities ==
The one-mile walk features several attractions such as train rides, riverboat cruises, restaurants, and a marina.

Fishing, biking, walking/running, and paddling are some available activities. During University of Tennessee (UT) home football games, the Vol Navy lines the river at Volunteer Landing as part of a tailgating tradition. There is also a playground, splash pads, a shelter, picnic areas, and restrooms available.

== Docks ==
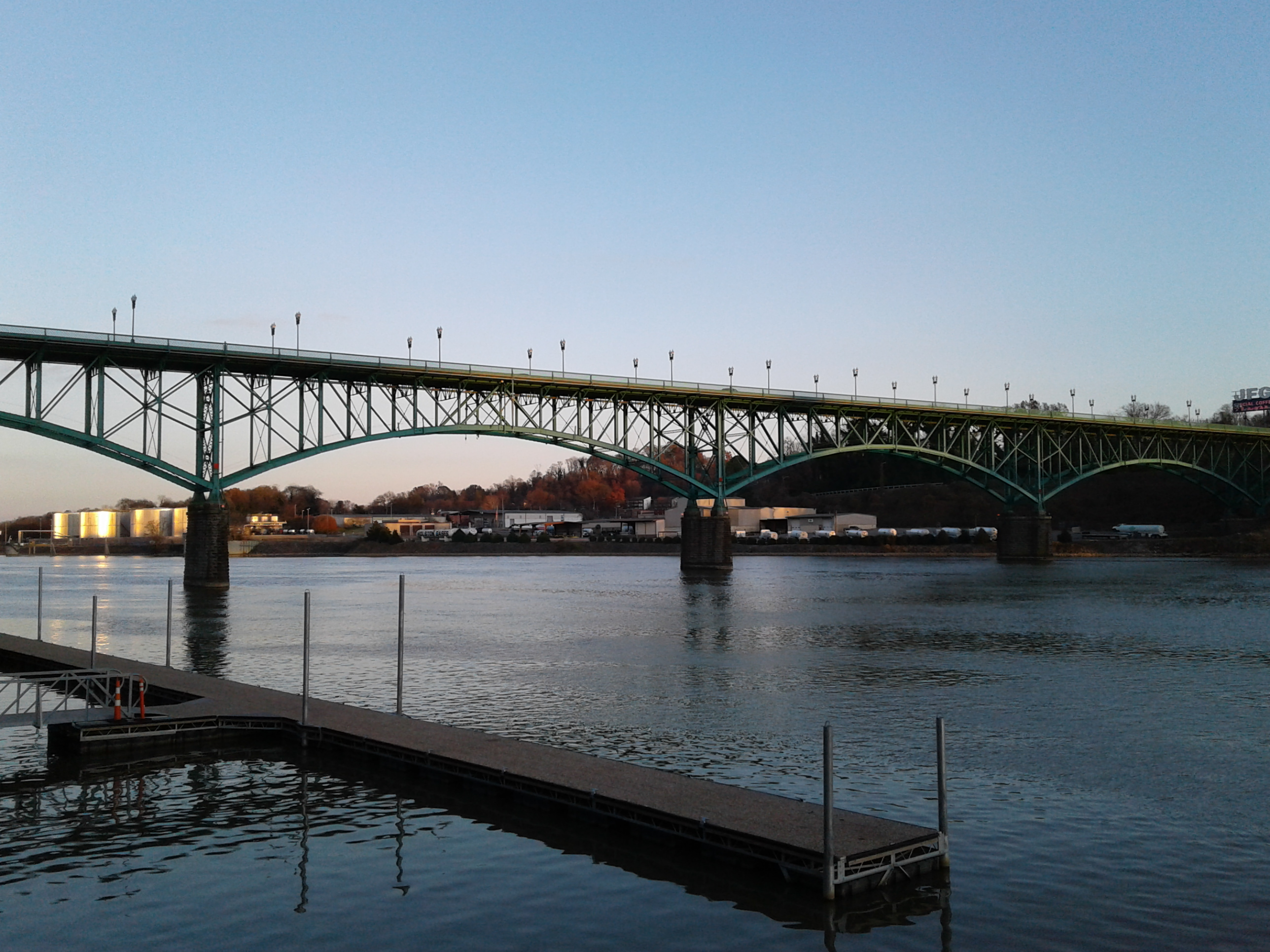
Dock near the restaurant Calhoun's On The River, November 2019

One dock was originally built for the 1982 World's Fair. In 2017, a privately owned boat hit the dock and damaged it. It was closed afterwards, though the city had already planned improvements prior to the incident. The replacement dock cost $270,000 and 75 percent was financed by a TWRA grant. In April 2018, city-owned 360-foot-long boat dock reopened.

The Vol Navy dock is near Neyland Stadium. The dock and concrete pavilion were built 1994 and was funded by a TWRA grant. In 1998, 200 feet were added. In 2019, the new dock was completed. It is nearly 600 feet long. The TWRA funded the project with a $400,000 grant and $100,000 came from the city and UT. The Public Building Authority managed the project. The city owns the dock and UT maintains it.
