= Gay Street Bridge =

Bridge in Knoxville, TN, USA over the Tennessee River

Coordinates: 35.9583°N 83.9145°W

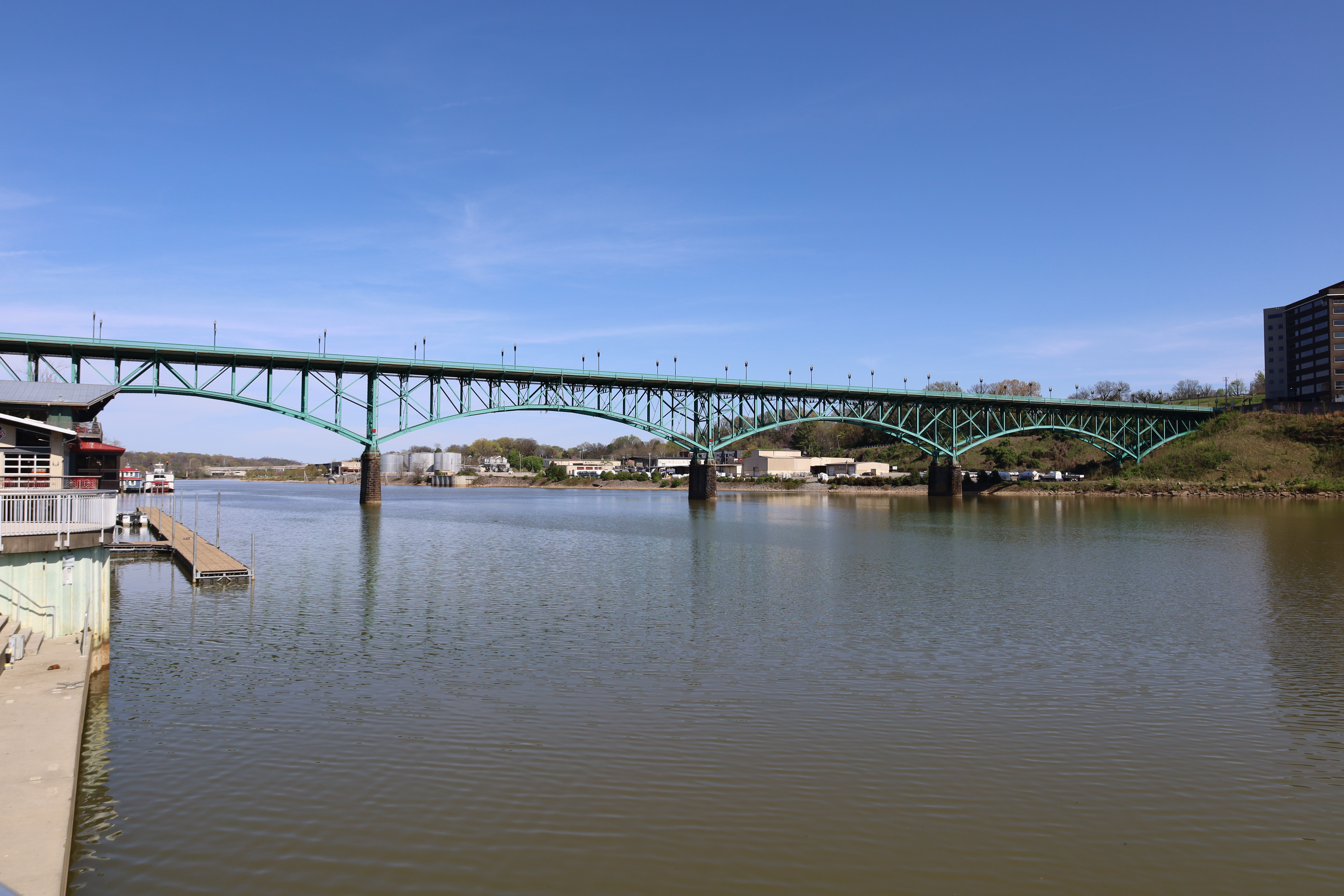
The bridge in 2025

The Gay Street Bridge is a pedestrian bridge that crosses the Tennessee River in Knoxville, Tennessee, United States. Completed in 1898, the 1,512-foot (461 m) bridge is the oldest of four bridges connecting Downtown Knoxville with South Knoxville, the other three being the Henley Bridge, the James E. "Buck" Karnes Bridge (Alcoa Highway), and the James C. Ford Memorial Bridge.

== Description ==
The bridge is a steel spandrel-braced (cantilever) arched design with a concrete deck. There are five arched trusses, each 252 feet (77 m) long, and two 126-foot (38 m) approach spans at each end, all supported by a foundation of stone piers. The deck is 42 feet (13 m) wide, and consists of two vehicle lanes, each flanked by a pedestrian sidewalk. The bridge originally contained trolley tracks, but these were removed in 1938.

== History ==
=== Previous bridges ===
The first bridge across the Tennessee River at this site was a temporary pontoon bridge built during the American Civil War. It was followed by a permanent bridge with stone supporting piers, built by Union General Ambrose E. Burnside, that was washed away in a flood in March 1867. Knox County built a covered bridge at the site, which opened on May 2, 1875, but it was blown down by a tornado shortly afterward.

The county sold the surviving piers and rights-of-way to G. W. Saulpaw, who built a wooden Howe truss bridge at the site in 1880. Saulpaw's bridge stood until 1898, when it was demolished after the completion of the Gay Street Bridge.

=== Planning and construction ===
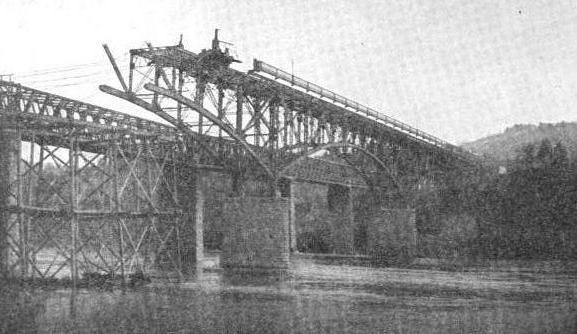
The Gay Street Bridge under construction, circa 1897–1898; the Saulpaw bridge (1880–1898) is on the left

The Gay Street Bridge was designed by Charles E. Fowler, chief engineer of the Youngstown Bridge Company of Ohio. Fowler later boasted that he had hastily sketched the bridge's design—which was chosen over three other bids—on the back of an envelope during his train ride to Knoxville to meet with county officials.

Construction of the bridge, which was supervised by Fowler, began in 1897. Due to the scarcity of certain building materials during the Spanish–American War, Fowler was forced to modify his original design, and was constantly bickering with Knox County officials over who should pay the extra costs.

=== Operation ===
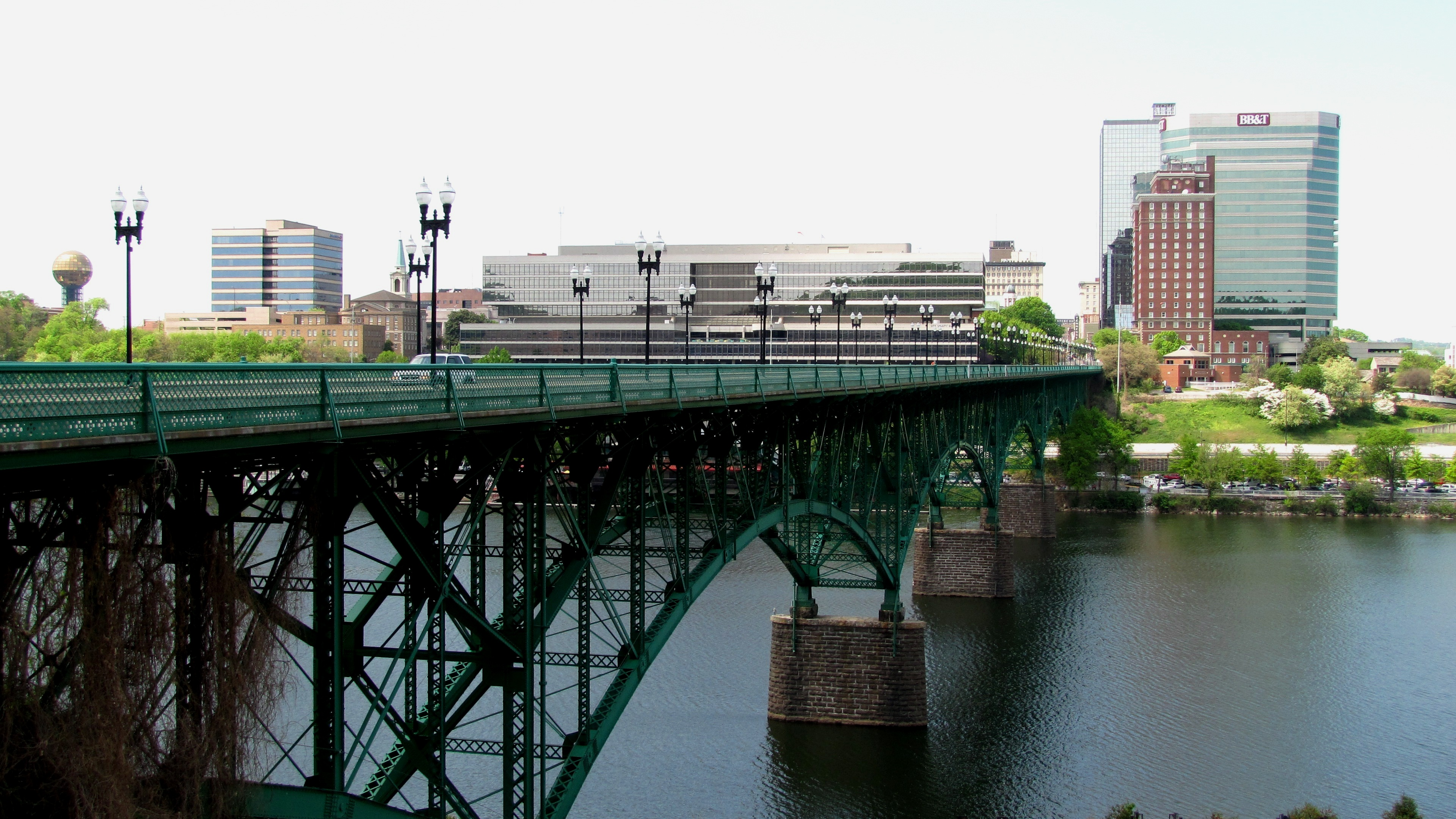
The bridge in 2010, with Knoxville's skyline in the distance

The Gay Street Bridge opened to traffic on July 9, 1898. Knox County issued a statement proclaiming the bridge "for the use of all the world except Spain," in reference to the war which had been raging throughout the year. Engineering journals such as Engineering News and Bridge Engineering praised the bridge's combination of safety and aesthetics. Because the 1898 bridge included trolley tracks, its construction accelerated residential development in the Island Home Park area on the south side of the river, which previously had been isolated from downtown Knoxville.

After receiving poor safety ratings, the bridge was extensively repaired in a project that required its closure from December 2001 to April 2004. Repairs included replacement of rusted pin joints and bearings and replacement of concrete on the bridge deck.

=== Closure ===
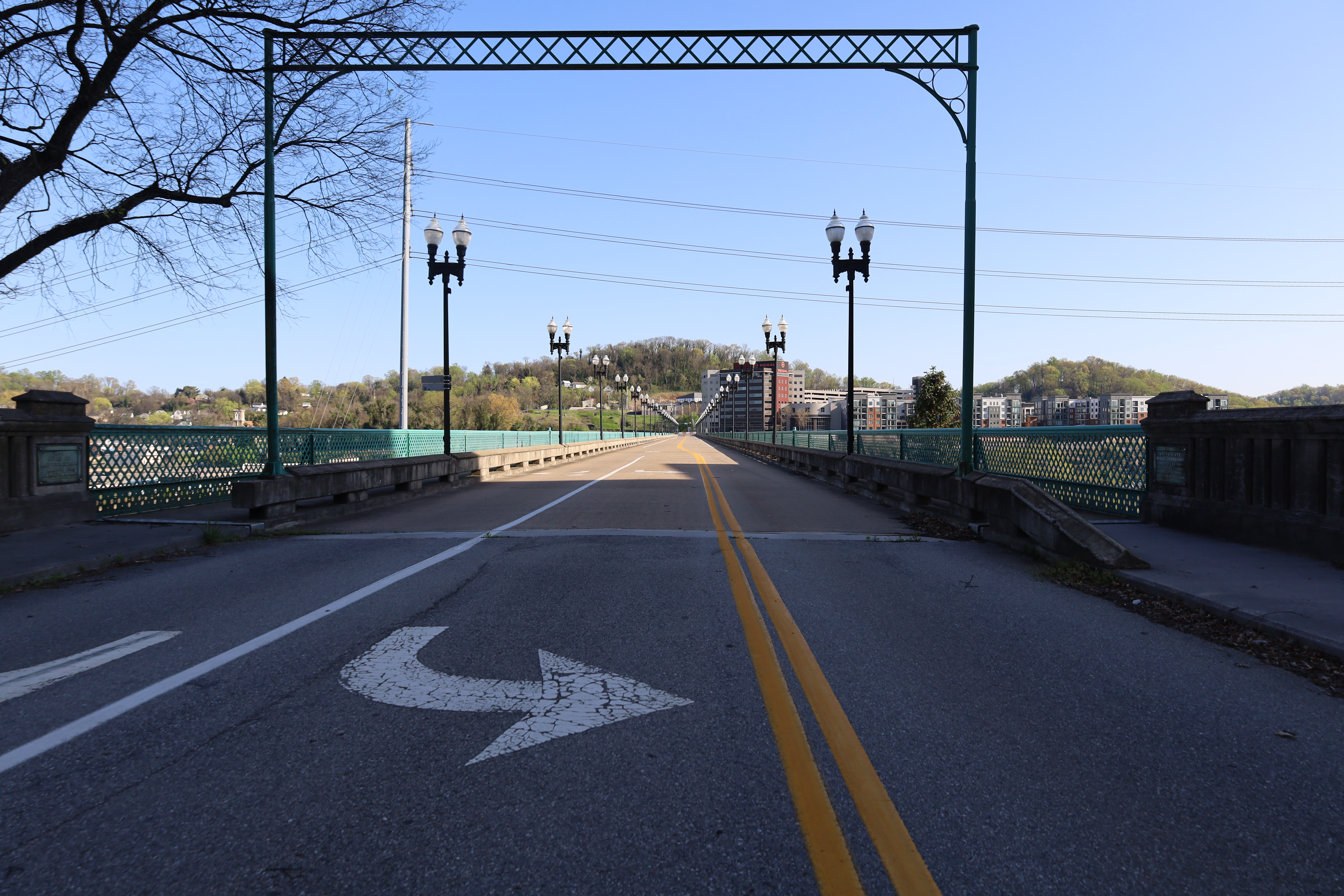
Deck of the bridge, currently inaccessible, in 2025

On June 25, 2024, after an annual inspection by the TN Department of Transportation (TDOT), the bridge was closed to all traffic, due to finding a "compromised element". Because the bridge is not on an official State maintained route, the City of Knoxville will be responsible for repairs. Until the closure, the bridge had passed every annual inspection by TDOT since the 2004 refurbishment.

On February 12, 2025, the City of Knoxville announced that The Gay Street Bridge would not re-open to vehicle traffic and would instead continue its life as a pedestrian and cycle bridge. In the same press conference, Knoxville Mayor Indya Kincannon said that the city will investigate the possibility of the bridge being re-opened to Knoxville Area Transit busses and emergency services in the future.

=== Reopening ===
On December 16, 2025, the bridge reopened for pedestrians and cyclists only.

== See also ==
- Volunteer Landing
