= Henley Bridge (Tennessee) =

Bridge in Tennessee, USA

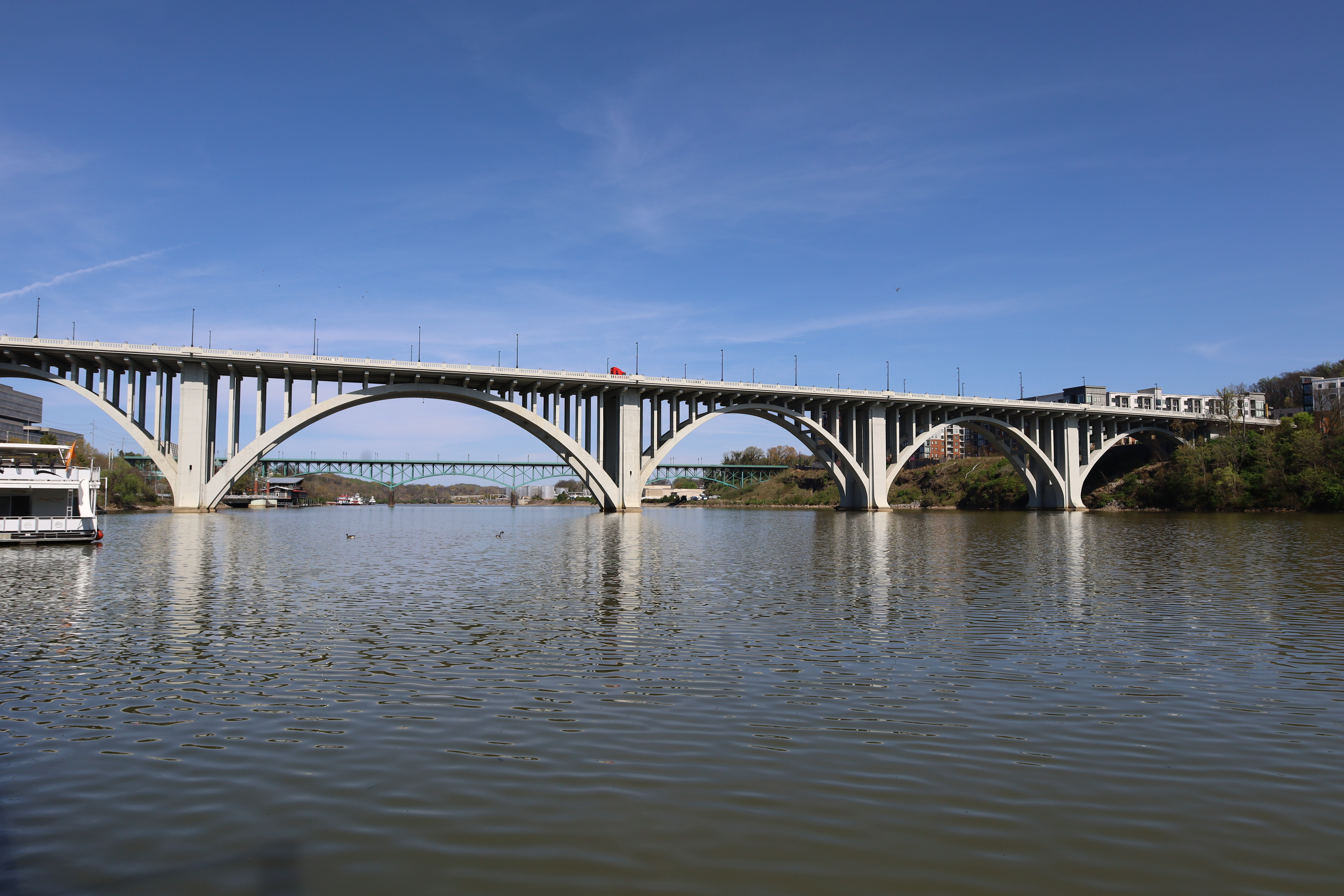
- The bridge in 2025
- Coordinates: 35°57′24″N 83°55′06″W
- Carries: Henley Street (US 441)
- Crosses: Tennessee River
- Locale: north side: Downtown Knoxville – south side: South Knoxville
- Other name: Henley Street Bridge
- Named for: David Henley
- Maintained by: Tennessee Department of Transportation
- Preceded by: Gay Street Bridge
- Followed by: Knoxville Norfolk Southern Railroad Bridge

Characteristics
- Design: Open-spandrel arch bridge
- Material: Concrete
- Total length: 1,793.4 ft (546.6 m)
- Width: 70 ft (21 m)
- Longest span: 317 ft (97 m)
- No. of spans: 6
- Piers in water: 4

History
- Architect: Marsh Engineering Company
- Engineering design by: L. M. Dow
- Constructed by: Booth and Flinn
- Construction start: September 30, 1930
- Construction end: 1931
- Construction cost: $1.15 million
- Opened: 1931; 95 years ago
- Inaugurated: January 2, 1932

Statistics
- Toll: none

Location
- Interactive map of Henley Bridge

The Henley Bridge, sometimes referred to as Henley Street Bridge, is a vehicle bridge that crosses the Tennessee River in Knoxville, Tennessee, United States. Completed in 1931, the 1,793-foot (547 m) bridge is one of three vehicle bridges connecting Downtown Knoxville with South Knoxville, the other two being the Buck Karnes Bridge (Alcoa Highway), and the James C. Ford Memorial Bridge. The bridge carries U.S. Route 441, which is known as "Henley Street" in downtown Knoxville and "Chapman Highway" in South Knoxville.

The bridge and its associated street are named for Colonel David Henley, a Revolutionary War officer and War Department agent stationed in Knoxville in the 1790s.

== Description ==
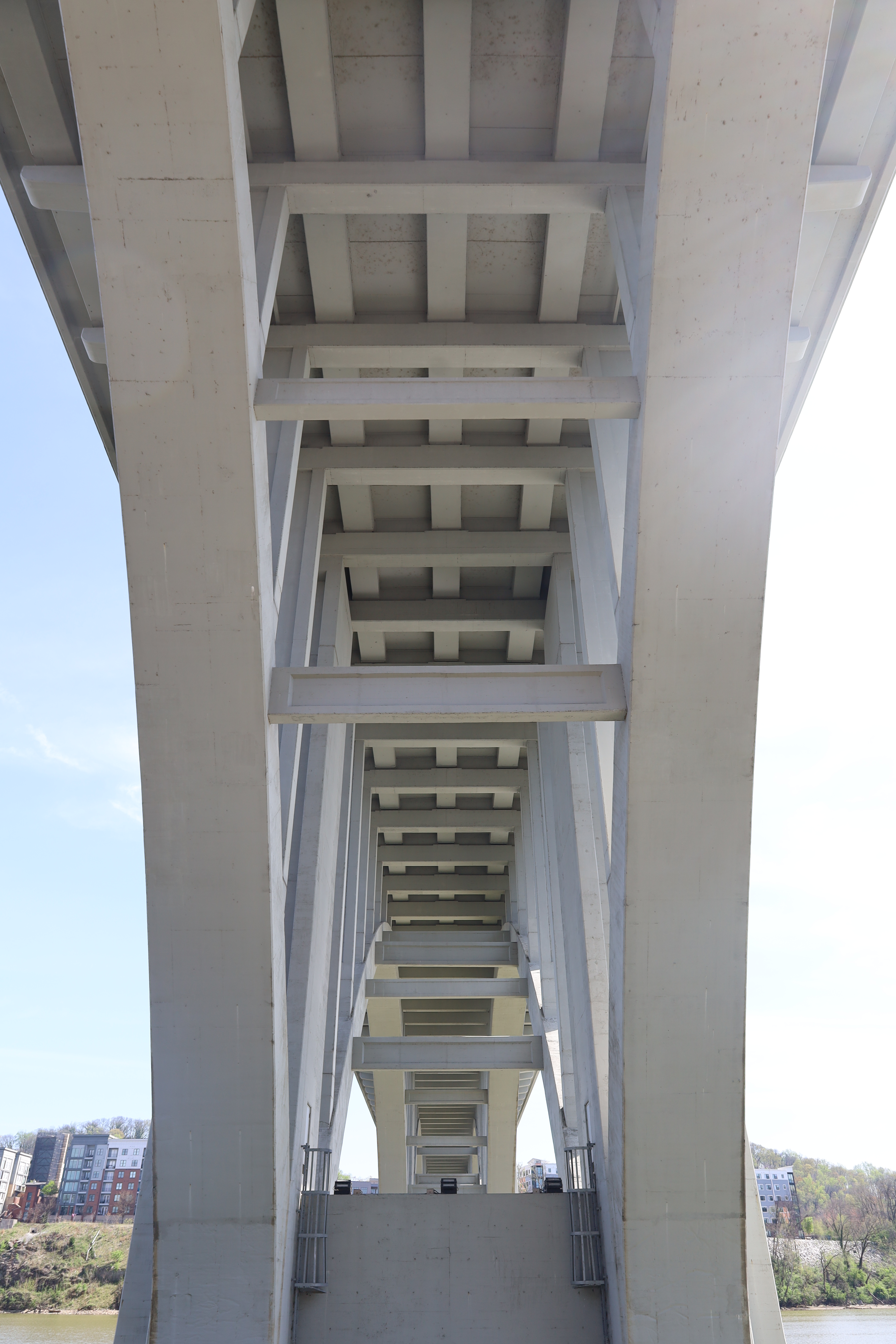
Underside of the bridge in 2025

The Henley Bridge is a reinforced concrete open-spandrel arch bridge with six dual-ribbed arches connected by lateral bracing. The lengths of the arches are (from north to south) 203 feet (62 m), 232 feet (71 m), 317 feet (97 m), 232 feet (71 m), 220 feet (67 m), and 185 feet (56 m). The deck consists of six concrete girders, and has a total width of just over 70 feet (21 m) and a curb-to-curb width of just over 54 feet (16 m).

== History ==
=== Planning and construction ===
In the late 1920s, Knoxville developed a new city plan that called for, among other things, the widening of Henley Street and the construction of a 54-foot-wide (16 m) bridge connecting the street with South Knoxville. The city initially hired J. E. Griner and Company of Baltimore, but after the company insisted that a 36-foot width was adequate, the city rejected their design. In April 1930, after intense debate, the city selected a design submitted by the Des Moines, Iowa-based Marsh Engineering Company, which was led by long-time bridge engineer James B. Marsh (1856–1936).

Throughout 1930, Knoxville's city council, various local engineers, and the Knoxville News-Sentinel argued relentlessly over the bridge, bickering with one another over everything from the bridge's size to the construction materials to be used. One councilman charged that bribery had taken place. Furthermore, rather than allow Marsh Engineering to choose its own construction supervisor, the city installed local engineers L. M. Dow and S. B. Goodsey as supervising engineer and resident engineer, respectively, and made numerous modifications to Marsh's design. Work finally began on September 30, 1930, with Pittsburgh contractor Booth and Flinn overseeing construction. The cost of construction was $1.15 million, which was split between the City of Knoxville and Knox County.

=== Early history ===
The completion of the Henley Bridge roughly coincided with the creation of the Great Smoky Mountains National Park, and the bridge became for Knoxvillians the "gateway" to the Smokies (US-441, which crosses the bridge, is still the main route connecting Knoxville with the park). During 1987–2015, the bridge was also the primary fireworks launching area during Knoxville's annual Boomsday celebration.

The Henley Bridge is mentioned in three novels by author Cormac McCarthy. In The Orchard Keeper (1968), a bootlegger's car breaks down on the bridge. In Suttree (1979), a homeless man known as "The Ragpicker" lives under the south end of the bridge. In The Road (2006), the Henley Bridge is the "high concrete bridge" the father and son cross near the beginning of the novel en route to the Great Smoky Mountains to the south.

=== Rehabilitation ===
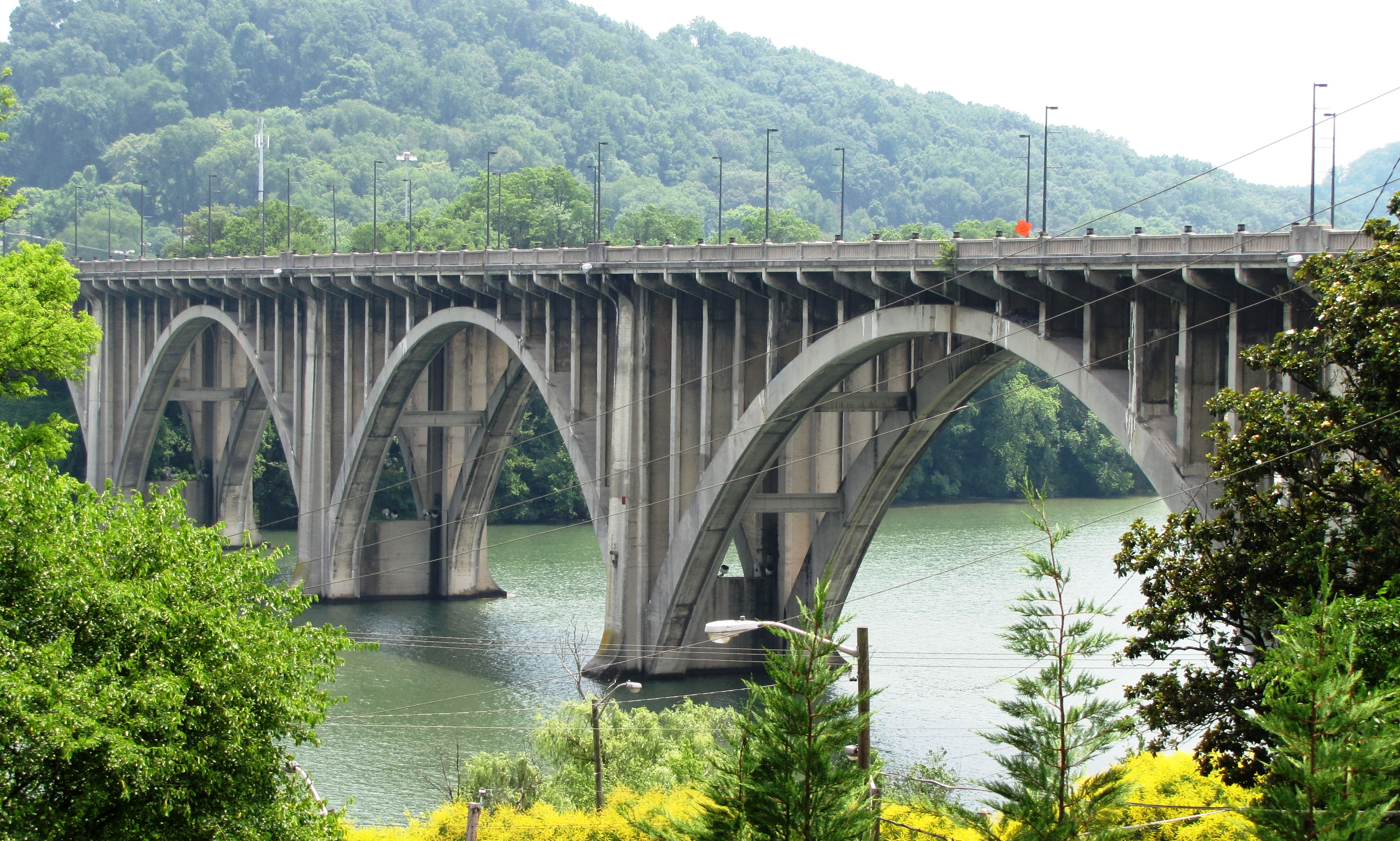
The Henley Bridge viewed from Hill Avenue in 2010

In 2011, the Tennessee Department of Transportation began a major rehabilitation project on the bridge. The improvements called for five total lanes of vehicular traffic, two bike lanes and sidewalks, as well as improved lighting.

The project was plagued with delays, most notably when two workers were killed in two separate incidents on the construction site. Britton Bridge LLC, the project's contractor, was fined and the construction progress was halted for two weeks by TDOT. There were also several previously undetected deficiencies in the bridge's structure that lagged progress and increased cost.

The project was partially completed with the opening of two of the five lanes of traffic on October 17, 2013. The final cost of the project is estimated at $32 million. Contractors finished paving work, striping and lighting improvements, and the bridge reopened on June 3, 2014.
