= James E. "Buck" Karnes Bridge =

Bridge in Tennessee, USA

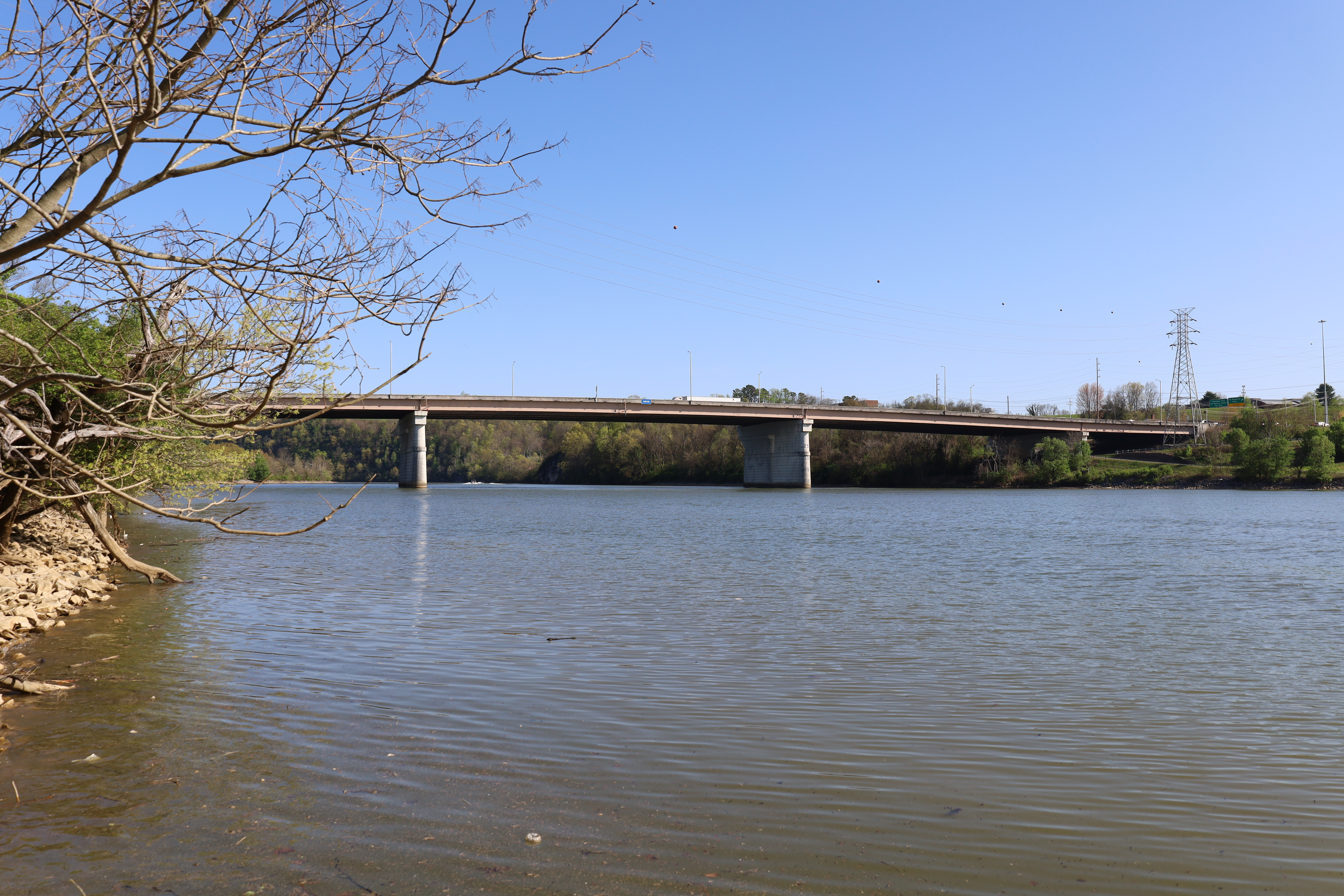
- The bridge in 2025
- Coordinates: 35°56′50″N 83°56′45″W
- Other name: Alcoa Highway Bridge
- Named for: James Ernest Karnes

Characteristics
- Total length: 1,169-foot (356 m)

Location
- Interactive map of James E. "Buck" Karnes Bridge

The James E. "Buck" Karnes Bridge, also known as the Alcoa Highway Bridge, and previously as the UT Farm Bridge, is a vehicle bridge that crosses the Tennessee River in Knoxville, Tennessee, United States. The bridge carries US 129/SR 115 (Alcoa Highway) between Knoxville and Maryville.

The 1,169-foot (356 m) bridge is one of three vehicle bridges connecting Downtown Knoxville with South Knoxville, the other two being the James C. Ford Memorial Bridge, (James White Parkway), and the Henley Bridge, (Chapman Hwy and Henley Street). The bridge is named in honor of James Ernest Karnes, a Sergeant in the United States Army. He served in World War I and was awarded the Medal of Honor for action in France in 1918.

The current bridge structure was completed in 1990, replacing an older structure that existed from 1930 to 1990 at the same location. The old bridge was originally constructed as one of many toll bridges throughout Tennessee. It was later 'freed' by the State Legislature and tolls officially removed in 1939. Since the bridge was completed prior to the road leading to its south being finished, no actual tolls were ever collected at this bridge.
