= South Knoxville =

Area of Knoxville, Tennessee, United States

Coordinates: 35.94254°N 83.91083°W

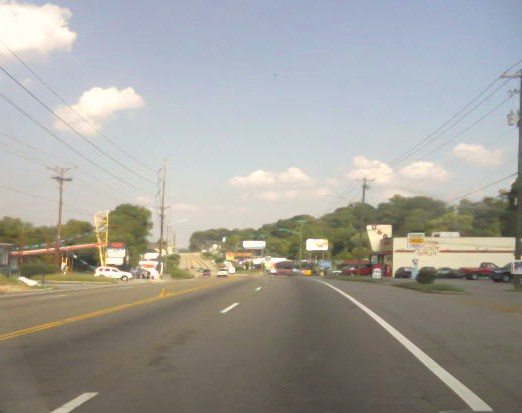
Chapman Highway, one of South Knoxville's main thoroughfares, in 2010.

South Knoxville is the section of Knoxville, Tennessee, United States, that lies south of the Tennessee River. It is concentrated along Chapman Highway (US 441), Alcoa Highway (US 129), Maryville Pike (SR 33), Sevierville Pike, and adjacent roads, and includes the neighborhoods of Lindbergh Forest, Island Home Park, Old Sevier, South Haven, Vestal, Lake Forest, South Woodlawn and Colonial Village. South Knoxville is connected to Downtown Knoxville via four vehicle bridges: the James C. Ford Memorial Bridge, the Gay Street Bridge, the Henley Bridge, by some incorrectly called the Henley Street Bridge, and the James E. "Buck" Karnes Bridge. Parts of South Knoxville were annexed by Knoxville in 1917.

== History ==
South Knoxville remained sparsely populated for most of the 19th century due to a lack of bridges spanning the river. Two notable early residents were Governor John Sevier, who established a farm at Marble Springs in the 1790s, and entrepreneur Perez Dickinson, who built a mansion known as "Island Home" on what is now the TSD campus in the 1850s. During the Civil War, a string of forts— Fort Higley, Fort Dickerson, Fort Stanley, and Sevierville Hill— were erected by Union forces in 1863, and played a major role in forcing General James Longstreet to attack the city from the west rather than from the south during his siege of the city later that year.

Major outcroppings of Tennessee marble in South Knoxville led to the development of several marble quarries and finishing facilities in the late 19th century, most notably the Ross-Republic quarries at what is now the Ijams Nature Center, and the Candoro Marble Works in Vestal. The completion of the Henley Bridge in 1931 and the opening of the Great Smoky Mountains National Park shortly afterward led to an explosion of commercial development along Chapman Highway, the primary route connecting Knoxville with the park.

As of the 2000 census, South Knoxville had a population of 18,516 residents. Economic initiatives in recent years have centered on improving the waterfront for recreational and commercial uses, development of the Urban Wilderness trail system, and improving the aesthetics and accessibility of Chapman Highway and Maryville Pike. The University of Tennessee Medical Center is one of South Knoxville's largest employers.

== Schools ==
South Knoxville's only high school is South-Doyle High School, which is actually located outside of the city limits of Knoxville. Other noted schools in the area are South-Doyle Middle School, South Knoxville Elementary, Bonny Kate Elementary and Mount Olive Elementary. South Knoxville is also home to the Tennessee School for the Deaf, the campus of which is located adjacent to the Island Home Park neighborhood. Dogwood Elementary and Moreland Heights Elementary are among several elementary schools in the area, each outside the city limits.

== Celebrities ==
Celebrities and notable people who are from or have lived in South Knoxville include federal judge William H. Hastie, actors David Keith, John Cullum and Johnny Knoxville, cartoonist Darby Conley, author Cormac McCarthy, Brad Renfro, and Pittsburgh Steelers punter Craig Colquitt.

== Notable mention ==
In 2010, South Knoxville's Ye Olde Steak House on Chapman Highway was featured in the third season of The Travel Channel's Man v. Food. In 2012 a book was published about South Knoxville and detailed the history of the area. The title is "South Knoxville."

== Gallery ==
All photos shown were taken in 2010.

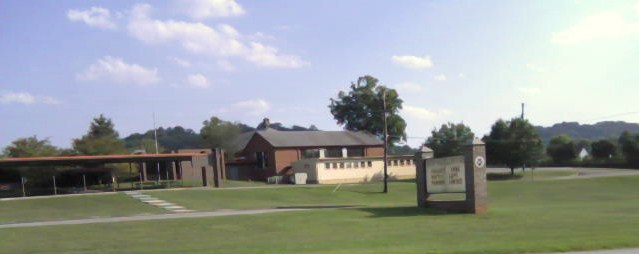
Bonny Kate Elementary

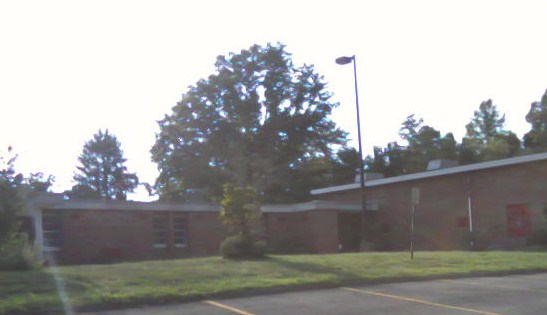
Mount Olive Elementary

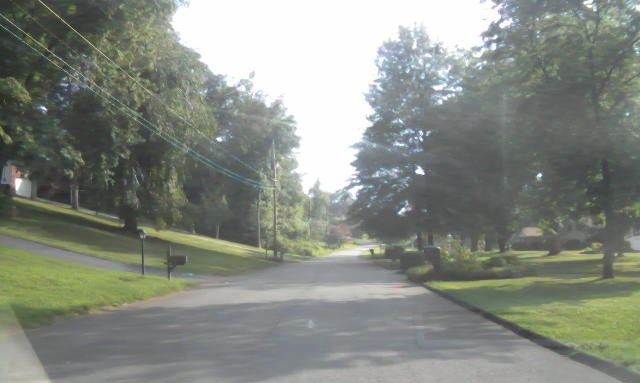
Apache Trail in the Arrowhead subdivision

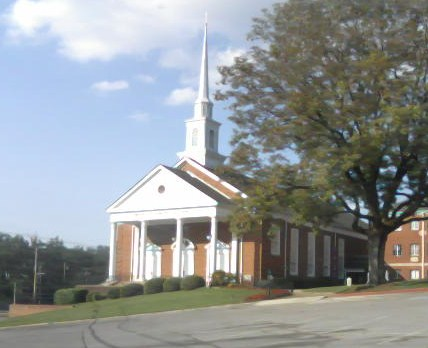
Mount Olive Baptist Church

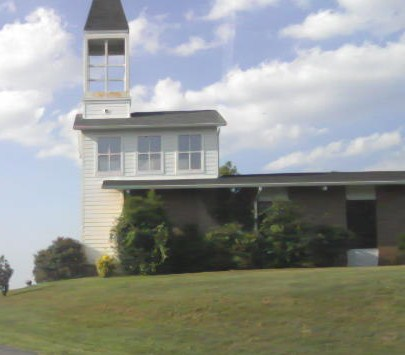
Mountain View United Methodist Church

== See also ==
- Alcoa
- Rockford
- Seymour
