= Knoxville Area Transit =

Public transit agency in Knoxville, Tennessee

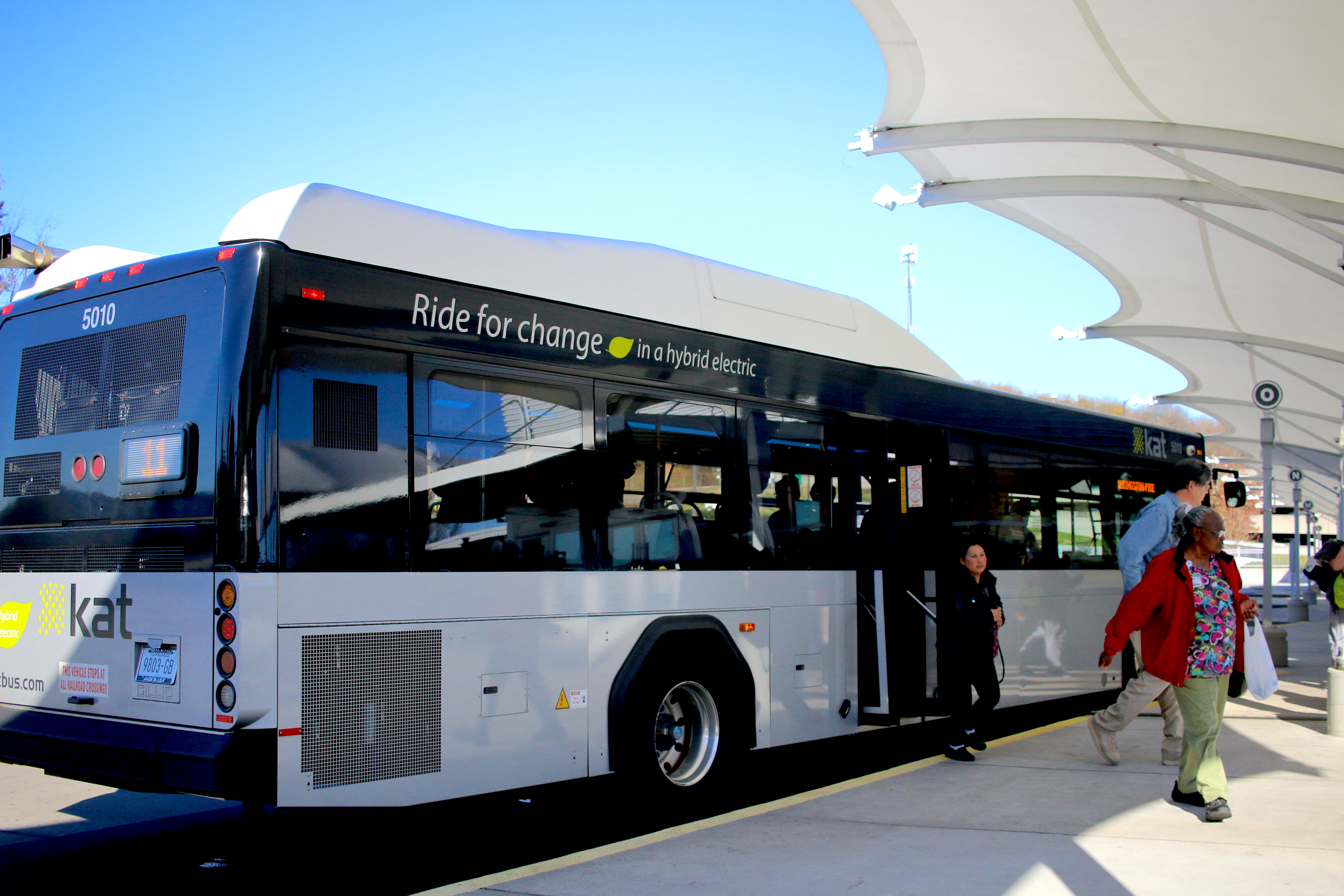
- Formerly: K-Trans
- Founded: 1967
- Headquarters: 301 Church Avenue
- Locale: Knoxville, Tennessee
- Service type: transit bus, paratransit
- Routes: 20
- Stops: 500+
- Stations: 1
- Fleet: Approx. 100
- Daily ridership: 8,000 (weekdays, Q2 2026)
- Annual ridership: 2,545,300 (2025)
- Fuel type: Gasoline, diesel, hybrid-electric, electric
- Executive Director: Isaac Thorne
- Website: katbus.com

Knoxville Area Transit (KAT) is the operator of public transportation in Knoxville, Tennessee. KAT operates 20 fixed bus routes, on-demand service, paratransit, and football shuttle buses. KAT formerly operated the transit service for the University of Tennessee, known as The T. In 2025, the system had a ridership of 2,545,300.

== History ==
Public transportation in Knoxville dates back to 1876 when the first streetcars of the Knoxville Street Railway Company were pulled by horses and mules along tracks on Gay Street. Since then, the transit system has undergone considerable changes, beginning in 1890 with the conversion from animal-drawn to electric-powered streetcars. In 1910, the system serviced 11 million passengers each year on 42 miles of track, introducing buses to serve the streetcar system's feeder routes in 1929. By the late 1940s, the system had mainly switched from electric streetcars to all buses, with electric streetcars making their last run in 1947. In 1958, bus service to the University of Tennessee was added to the system. The bus service continued to get upgrades, with air-conditioned GMC buses added to the Knoxville transit fleet in 1972.

In the 1980s and 1990s, the Knoxville transit system went through some internal changes, first moving into a new facility on Magnolia Avenue in 1989 and then changing its name from "K-Trans" to "Knoxville Area Transit (KAT)" in 1995. From the 90s onward, the KAT system continued to upgrade, with a focus on environmental responsibility, beginning its Clean Fuels Program with the introduction of propane-powered vehicles in 2003. The next year, the KAT system was named North American Transit System of the Year by the American Public Transportation Association. In 2010, the transit system again changed facilities, moving its center of operations to the John J. Duncan Jr. Knoxville Station. In 2014, KAT introduced three hybrid vehicles into its regular fleet.

== Operations ==
Service on KAT routes operate 7 days a week.

=== Current bus routes ===
Route	Name	Terminals		Notes
1	Downtown Connector	Knoxville Station	Depot Ave	Replaced trolley.-15 minute headways.
10	Sequoyah Hills	Knoxville Station	Keowee at Kenesaw	Monday to Friday Peak only
11	Sutherland/Kingston Pike	Knoxville Station	Walmart	
12	Western Avenue	Knoxville Station	Western aftern McKamey	
15	Woodland Crosstown	Knoxville Station	Walmart	
16	Middlebrook/Cedar Bluff	Knoxville Station	Windsor Square on Market Place Blvd	
17	Sutherland	Knoxville Station	Forest Park	
20	Central/Clinton Highway	Knoxville Station	Northwest Crossing	
22	Broadway	Knoxville Station	Jackboro and Essary	
23	Millertown	Knoxville Station	Target	Weekdays and Saturdays only
24	Lincoln Park/Inskip	Knoxville Station	Central St and Woodlawn Dr	
31	Magnolia Avenue	Knoxville Station	Asheville Hwy before Holston Dr	
32	Dandridge Avenue	Knoxville Station	Kirkwood St Superstop	
34	Burlington Shopper	Knoxville Station	Walmart	
37	Morningside/Riverside	Knoxville Station	Natchez and Wilder	
40	South Knoxville	Knoxville Station	Chapman Hwy after Young High Pk	
41	Chapman Highway	Knoxville Station	Chapman Hwy after Young High Pk	
42	Fort Sanders/UT Medical Centers	Knoxville Station	UT Medical Center	
44	University Park Apartments	University Park Office	UT Transfer Point	Weekdays when UT classes are in session only
45	Vestal	Knoxville Station	Hedgeapple before Young High Pk	

=== Gameday shuttles ===
KAT offers special shuttles for Tennessee Volunteers home football games and other events at Neyland Stadium. These lines are assigned the special "51" designator.

Route	Outer terminus
51A	Civic Coliseum
51D	Old City
51E	Market Square / Krutch Park

KAT also provides shuttles to Covenant Health Park from the Market Street, Langley, and Summer Place parking garages during Knoxville Smokies and One Knoxville SC games. The shuttles are free and operate every 10 minutes.

=== katConnect ===
katConnect is an on-demand service launched in August 2024. It serves the three apartment complexes in North Knoxville, connecting them to nearby bus stops.

=== The LIFT ===
KAT offers Paratransit LIFT service for those persons who are unable to use regular fixed-route buses. The LIFT is by reservation only, and you must be certified by KAT to use the service.

== Fares ==
Cash fares are $1.00 for adults and $0.50 for seniors and disabled people. Day passes and 30-day passes are available using a katpay card or the Transit app. Knox County Schools students can ride for free through the Youth Freedom Pass program. Fares for Football Shuttle buses are $10.00 round trip and must be paid using the Transit app.

== See also ==
- List of bus transit systems in the United States
