= Tennessee State Route 331 =

State highway in Tennessee, United States

State Route 331
- TN 331 highlighted in red

Route information
- Maintained by TDOT
- Length: 15.4 mi (24.8 km)
- Existed: July 1, 1983–present

Major junctions
- South end: US 441 / SR 33 in Knoxville
- I-640 / US 25W in Knoxville; SR 131 in Corryton
- North end: SR 61 near Blaine

Location
- Country: United States
- State: Tennessee
- Counties: Knox

Highway system
- Tennessee State Routes; Interstate; US; State
← SR 330	→ SR 332

State Route 331 (SR 331) is a mostly west–east, signed north–south, secondary highway in Knox County in the U.S. state of Tennessee.

== Route description ==
SR 331 begins in Knoxville at an intersection with US 441/SR 33 (Broadway). SR 331 goes north as Old Broadway to enter Fountain City, where it has an interchange with I-640/US 25W (Exit 6) before having a partial interchange with US 441/SR 33. It then turns northeast to come to a Y-Intersection between Jacksboro Pike and Tazewell Pike, where SR 331 becomes Tazewell Pike. The highway continues northeast through suburbs before leaving Knoxville and going through farmland. SR 331 then enters Corryton comes to an intersection with SR 131 (E Emory Road), where SR 331 turns east onto E Emory Road while SR 131 turns north onto Tazewell Pike. SR 331 continues northeast to pass through downtown, where it has an intersection with Corryton Road, a major county Road that leads to Plainview and SR 144. It then leaves Corryton to continue northeast through farmland to come to an end at an intersection with SR 61 just west of Blaine.

== Major intersections ==
The entire route is in Knox County.

Location	mi	km	Destinations	Notes
Knoxville	0.0	0.0	US 441 / SR 33 (SR 71/Broadway)	Southern terminus
Knoxville			I-640 / US 25W (SR 9) – Nashville, Asheville	I-640/US 25W exit 6
Knoxville			US 441 south / SR 33 south (SR 71/Broadway)	Interchange; northbound exit and southbound entrance from Broadway
Corryton			SR 131 (Tazewell Pike/Emory Road) – Plainview, Halls Crossroads	
	15.4	24.8	SR 61 – Luttrell, Blaine	Northern terminus
1.000 mi = 1.609 km; 1.000 km = 0.621 mi: Incomplete access
