= Tennessee State Route 144 =

Highway in Tennessee

State Route 144
- SR 144 highlighted in red

Route information
- Maintained by TDOT
- Length: 7.9 mi (12.7 km)

Major junctions
- West end: SR 170 near Maynardville
- SR 33 / SR 61 in Maynardville
- East end: SR 131 in Plainview

Location
- Country: United States
- State: Tennessee
- Counties: Union

Highway system
- Tennessee State Routes; Interstate; US; State
← SR 143	→ SR 145

State Route 144 (SR 144) is a 7.9-mile-long (12.7 km) state highway in Union County, Tennessee. It connects Hickory Star and Maynardville with Plainview.

== Route description ==
SR 144 begins as Hickory Star Road in Hickory Star at an intersection with SR 170. The highway goes southeast and crosses over a ridge to enter Maynardville and have a short concurrency with SR 33/SR 61, just west of downtown. SR 144 then leaves Maynardville and continues southeast as Ailor Gap Road and crosses over another Ridge to come to an intersection with SR 370. SR 144 continues southeast to enter Plainview and come to an end at an intersection with SR 131 just west of town, where the road continues southeast as Corryton Road to Corryton.

== Junction list ==
The entire route is in Union County.

Location	mi	km	Destinations	Notes
	0.0	0.0	SR 170 (Hickory Valley Road) – Andersonville, Hickory Star, Big Ridge State Park	Western terminus; road continues north to Hickory Star
Maynardville	2.6	4.2	SR 33 south / SR 61 west (Maynardville Highway) – Halls Crossroads, Knoxville	Western end of SR 33/SR 61 concurrency
Maynardville	2.9	4.7	SR 33 north / SR 61 east (Maynardville Highway) – New Tazewell, Tazewell	Eastern end of SR 33/SR 61 concurrency
	6.4	10.3	SR 370 north (Wolfe Road) – Potato Valley	Southern terminus of SR 370
Plainview	7.9	12.7	SR 131 (Tazewell Pike) – Luttrell, Corryton, Knoxville	Eastern terminus; road continues south as Corryton Road to Corryton
1.000 mi = 1.609 km; 1.000 km = 0.621 mi: Concurrency terminus
