= Tennessee State Route 170 =

State highway in Tennessee, United States

State Route 170
- SR 170 highlighted in red

Route information
- Maintained by TDOT
- Length: 35.9 mi (57.8 km)

Major junctions
- West end: SR 62 in Oak Ridge
- US 25W in Claxton; I-75 in Heiskell; US 441 near Norris
- East end: SR 33 near Maynardville

Location
- Country: United States
- State: Tennessee
- Counties: Anderson, Knox, Union

Highway system
- Tennessee State Routes; Interstate; US; State
← SR 169	→ SR 171

State Route 170 (SR 170) is a state highway in the eastern part of the U.S. state of Tennessee. It travels through portions of Anderson, Knox and Union counties. It connects Oak Ridge to the Maynardville area.

== Route description ==
=== Anderson County ===
SR 170 begins in Anderson County in Oak Ridge as Edgemore Road at a trumpet interchange with SR 62 (Illinois Avenue), right across the Clinch River from the town of Solway. It then heads northeast as an improved 2-lane highway, paralleling the Clinch and passing by several golf courses and apartments before coming to an intersection with Melton Lake Drive, just after passing Haw Ridge Park. It then immediately crosses over a long, tall, and narrow bridge over the Clinch River/Melton Hill Lake, entering Claxton and passing by the Bull Run Steam Plant. It then passes through the countryside of the Claxton Community before coming to an intersection with US 25W/SR 9 (Clinton Highway) at the center of the community, right beside the Claxton Elementary School. SR 170 then becomes Raccoon Valley Road as it narrows to a 2-lane country road. SR 170 then leaves Claxton and Anderson County, crossing into Knox County.

=== Knox County ===
It then travels down a narrow valley and passes through Heiskell before having an interchange with I-75 (Exit 117). It then transitions to Old Raccoon Valley Road at an intersection where Raccoon Valley Road splits off and goes to the north, just before coming to an intersection and becoming concurrent with US 441/SR 71 (Norris Freeway, which is not an actual freeway but a 2-lane highway). They head northwest through some mountains and hollows, crossing back into Anderson County.

=== Anderson and Union Counties ===
SR 170 splits off as Hickory Valley Road and goes northeast as 2-lane country road once again, becoming slightly curvy before crossing into Union County and going down a long valley to enter New Loyston to intersect and have a short, wrong way concurrency with SR 61 (Andersonville Highway) just south of Big Ridge State Park. SR 170 then passes near Hickory Star, intersecting with SR 144 (Hickory Star Road). It then runs parallel to Norris Lake before finally ending at a Y-intersection with SR 33 (Maynardville Highway) just north of Maynardville.

== Junction list ==
County	Location	mi	km	Destinations	Notes
Anderson	Oak Ridge	0.0	0.0	SR 62 (Oak Ridge Highway / Illinois Avenue) – Oak Ridge, Karns, Knoxville	Western terminus; interchange
Anderson	Claxton			US 25W (Clinton Highway/SR 9) – Clinton, Powell	
Knox	Heiskell			I-75 – Lexington, Knoxville	I-75 exit 117
Knox	Heiskell			US 441 south (Norris Freeway/SR 71 south) – Halls Crossroads, Knoxville	Western end of US 441/SR 71 concurrency
Anderson				US 441 north (Norris Freeway/SR 71 north) – Norris, Norris Dam State Park, Rocky Top	Eastern end of US 441/SR 71 concurrency
Union	New Loyston			SR 61 east (Andersonville Highway) – Maynardville	Western end of SR 61 wrong-way concurrency
Union	New Loyston			SR 61 west (Andersonville Highway) – Big Ridge State Park, Norris, Andersonville, Clinton	Eastern end of SR 61 wrong-way concurrency.
Union				SR 144 east (Hickory Star Road) – Maynardville, Hickory Star	Western terminus of SR 144; Hickory Star is to the left and SR 144 goes right going eastbound
Union		35.9	57.8	SR 33 (Maynardville Highway) – Maynardville, New Tazewell, Tazewell	Eastern terminus
1.000 mi = 1.609 km; 1.000 km = 0.621 mi: Concurrency terminus

== See also ==
- List of state routes in Tennessee
