= Tennessee State Route 61 =

State highway in Tennessee, United States

State Route 61
- Harvey H. Hannah Memorial Highway
- SR 61; primary in red, secondary in blue

Route information
- Maintained by TDOT
- Length: 81.67 mi (131.44 km)
- Existed: October 1, 1923–present

Major junctions
- West end: US 27 / US 70 in Rockwood
- I-40 in Harriman; US 27 near Harriman; SR 62 / SR 330 in Oliver Springs; SR 95 near Oak Ridge; US 25W at Clinton; I-75 near Bethel; US 441 near Andersonville; SR 33 at Paulette; SR 33 at Maynardville
- East end: US 11W at Blaine

Location
- Country: United States
- State: Tennessee
- Counties: Roane, Anderson, Union, Knox, Grainger

Highway system
- Tennessee State Routes; Interstate; US; State
← US 61	→ SR 62

State Route 61 (SR 61) is a west-to-east highway in the U.S. state of Tennessee that is 81.67-mile-long (131.44 km). SR 61 begins in Roane County, and it ends in Grainger County.

== Route description ==
=== Roane County ===
SR 61 begins in Roane County as a primary highway in the city of Rockwood at an intersection with US 27/US 70/SR 29/SR 1. It begins concurrent with US 27 as its companion route though it is signed, except on I-40. They then proceed north as a four-lane divided highway and have a junction with the short SR 382, providing access to Roane State Community College, and cross into Harriman. US 27/SR 61 continue north to have an interchange with I-40 (Exit 347), with only US 27 signed, and enter the "South Harriman" neighborhood. US 27/SR 61 continue through Harriman's main business district and again intersect and have an unsigned concurrency with SR 29, US 27's main companion route. They then cross the Emory River and enter downtown Harriman as Roane Street. They continue through downtown, still as a four-lane, and junction with SR 328, a loop route through the town of Oakdale. The highway leaves downtown, as a four-lane divide highway, and go by the Harriman campus of Tennessee College of Applied Technology (TCAT) and exit Harriman. US 27 and SR 61 then split at an interchange, with SR 29 following US 27 as its companion route. SR 61 turns east alone as two-lane rural highway. SR 61 then intersects SR 327 in the community of Blair. It then enters the community of Kellytown before entering the city of Oliver Springs. The highway widens into a four-lane highway with a center turn lane. SR 61 then comes to an intersection with SR 62, which is the main highway in and out of Morgan County, and SR 330, which provides access to downtown, and becomes concurrent with SR 62 north of downtown. SR 61/SR 62 then bypass downtown to the north and east as a four-lane divided highway with partially controlled access and crosses into Anderson County.

=== Anderson County ===
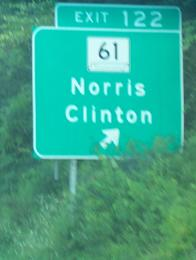
Sign on I-75 for SR 61

They then have a partial interchange with Main Street and enter Oliver Springs' main business district. Continuing southeast, they then separate with SR 62 heading into Oak Ridge and SR 61 becoming a secondary highway as it goes toward Clinton as a two-lane rural highway. It goes through some farmland in the communities of Batley and Marlow on a nearly four-mile-long (6.4 km) straightaway before becoming slightly curvy before coming to an intersection with SR 95. It then turns east again, becoming a primary highway, as a four-lane undivided highway running along the banks of the Clinch River. SR 61 then enters the city of Clinton and junctions with US 25W/SR 9. The highway continues on through downtown and becomes a four-lane divided highway and crosses the Clinch River. SR 61 now has an interchange with I-75 (Exit 122), leaving Clinton and becoming a secondary highway. It then passes through the community of Bethel, where it passes by the Museum of Appalachia, before entering Norris and having an intersection and short concurrency with US 441/SR 71. The highway now leaves Norris and becomes a two-lane rural highway. SR 61 then goes through the community of Andersonville before becoming extremely curvy and narrow, and enters Union County.

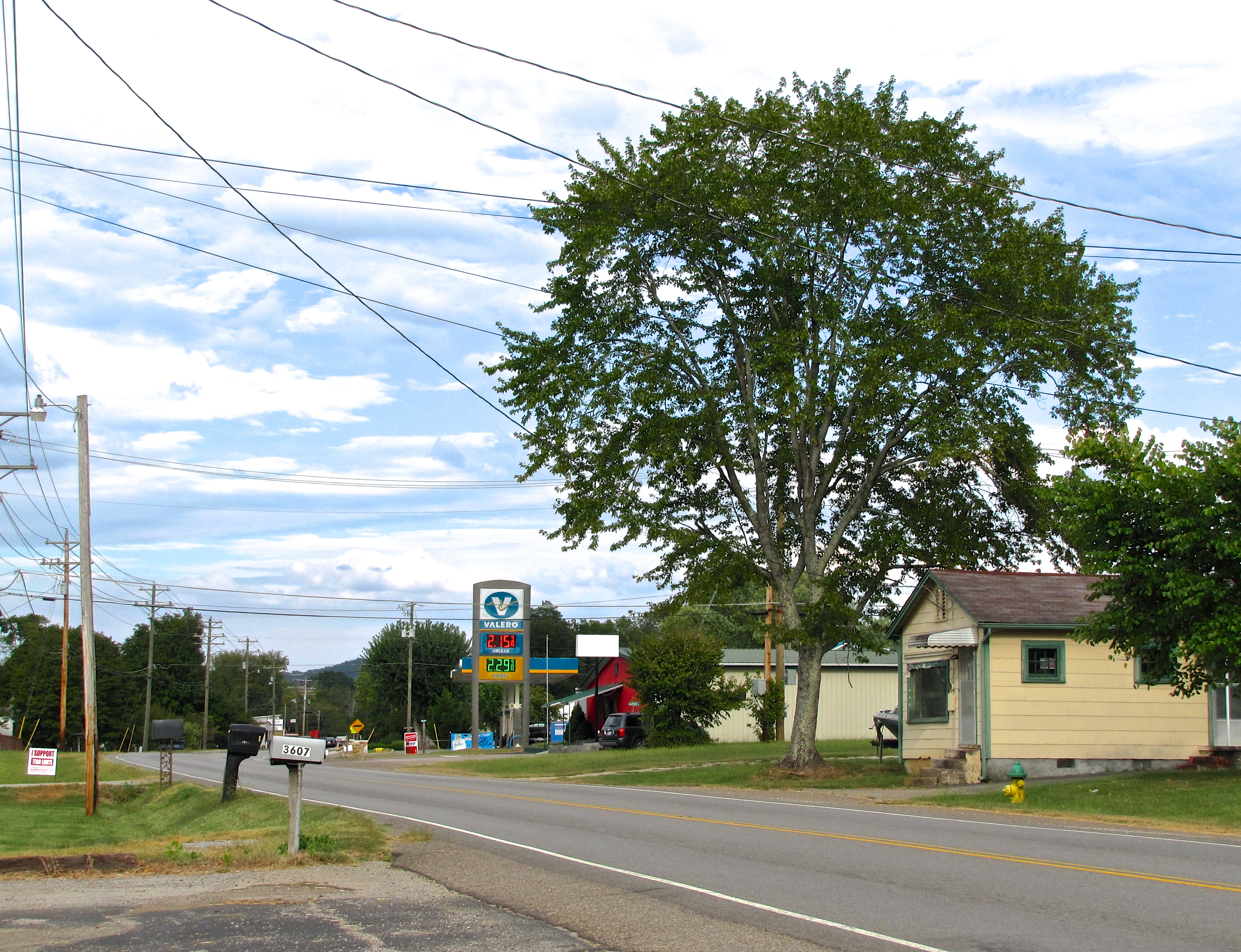
State Route 61 in Andersonville, Tennessee.

=== Union County ===
It then runs alongside Norris Lake for a few miles and passes Big Ridge State Park before intersecting with SR 170 in New Loyston. The highway junctions and becomes concurrent with SR 33 in Paulette and the two highways enter Maynardville as a two-lane rural highway. In Maynardville, it becomes a four-lane undivided highway and intersects with SR 144. They then leave Maynardville and revert to a two-lane rural highway. SR 33 and SR 61 then separate and SR 61 becomes curvy once again and intersects SR 370 before entering Luttrell and having an intersection and short concurrency with SR 131.

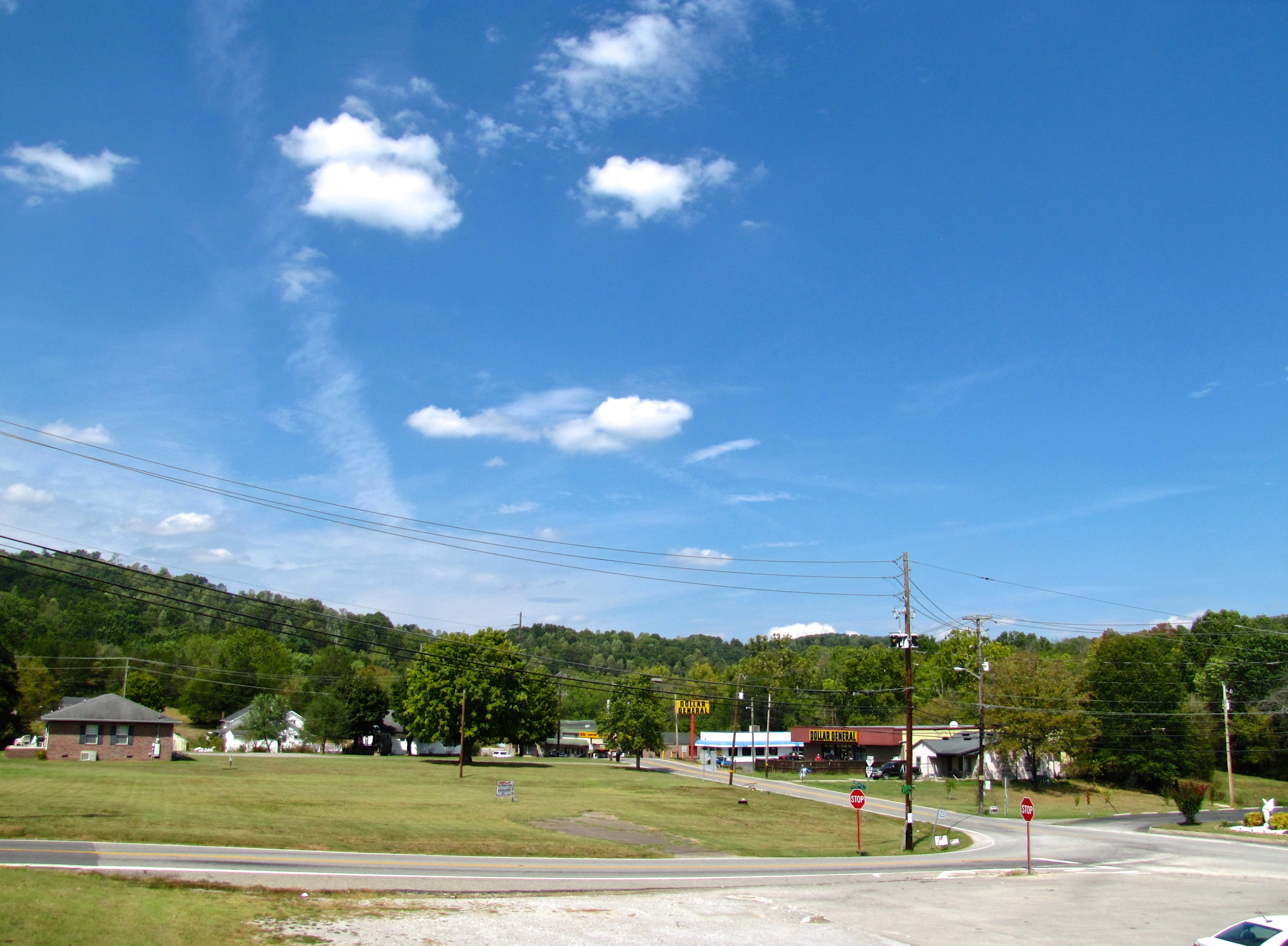
The intersection of State Route 131 and State Route 61 in Luttrell.

=== Knox and Grainger Counties ===
It then shortly crosses into Knox County and intersects with SR 331 near Corryton before crossing into Grainger County. The highway then enters Blaine and comes to an end at an intersection with US 11W / SR 1, ending as a secondary highway.

== Harvey H. Hannah Memorial Highway ==
Along the highway from Harriman to Oliver Springs, Highway 61 is called "The Harvey H. Hannah Highway". Harvey H. Hannah of Oliver Springs was the Tennessee Chairman of the State Railroad and Public Utilities Commission for 30 years. He served in the Spanish–American War, becoming colonel of the 4th Tennessee Volunteers. He also became a military governor of a Cuban province. Cordell Hull, who became United States Secretary of State, served as a captain under Hannah. Besides being a lawyer, military officer and politician, he was well known as a great orator. He served as Adjutant General under two Tennessee governors from 1903 to 1907. This was where he acquired the title "General". In 1922, General Hannah was a candidate for governor in the Democratic primary but was defeated by Austin Peay, who became governor. On November 8, 1936, Hannah died from a throat condition. Governor Hill McAlister visited Hannah before his death and asked, "Harvey, is there anything that I can do for you?" He replied, "Hill, I know that money is hard to get, but I hope that you will find enough state money to finish the Oliver Springs-Harriman highway." The Governor obtained the money, and the highway was named in Hannah's honor. Hannah is buried in the Oliver Springs Cemetery and his tombstone is said to be the tallest monument in the Oliver Springs area.

== Major intersections ==
County	Location	mi	km	Destinations	Notes
Roane	Rockwood	0.00	0.00	US 27 south / US 70 (North Gateway Avenue/Roane State Highway/SR 1/SR 29) – Midtown, Kingston, Spring City, Crab Orchard	Western terminus; Western end of US 27 overlap; SR 61 begins as a primary state route
Roane	Cardiff			SR 382 south (Patton Lane) – Roane State Community College	Northern terminus of SR 382
Roane	Harriman			I-40 – Knoxville, Nashville	I-40 exit 347
Roane	Harriman			SR 29 south (Ruritan Road) – Midtown	Western end of SR 29 overlap
Roane	Harriman			William Hamilton Browder Bridge over the Emory River	
Roane	Harriman			SR 328 north (Georgia Avenue Northwest) – Oakdale	Southern terminus of SR 328
Roane				US 27 north (Bitter Creek Highway/SR 29 north) – Wartburg	Eastern end of US 27 / SR 29 overlap
Roane	Blair			SR 327 south (Blair Road) – Oak Ridge	Northern terminus of SR 327
Roane	Oliver Springs			SR 62 west (Knoxville Highway) – Coalfield, Wartburg SR 330 north (Main Street) – Downtown Oliver Springs	Western end of SR 62 overlap; Southern terminus of SR 330
Anderson	Oliver Springs			Downtown Oliver Springs To SR 330 (Spring Street) – Briceville	Westbound Interchange only; No Eastbound access
Anderson	Oliver Springs			SR 62 (North Illinois Avenue) – Oak Ridge, Knoxville	Eastern end of SR 62 overlap; SR 61 turns secondary
Anderson				SR 95 south (Oak Ridge Turnpike) – Oak Ridge	Northern terminus of SR 95; SR 61 turns primary
Anderson	Clinton			US 25W (South Main Street/SR 9) – Rocky Top, Powell	
Anderson	Clinton			Veterans Memorial Bridge over the Clinch River	
Anderson	Clinton			I-75 – Knoxville, Lexington	I-75 exit 122; SR 61 turns secondary
Anderson	Norris			US 441 north (Norris Freeway/SR 71) – Norris Dam State Park, Norris Dam, Rocky Top	Western end of US 441 / SR 71 overlap
Anderson	Norris			US 441 south (Norris Freeway/SR 71) – Halls Crossroads, Knoxville	Eastern end of US 441 / SR 71 concurrency
Union	New Loyston			SR 170 east (Hickory Valley Road) – Hickory Star	Western end of SR 170 wrong-way overlap
Union	New Loyston			SR 170 west (Hickory Valley Road)	Eastern end of SR 170 wrong-way overlap
Union	Paulette			SR 33 south (Maynardville Highway) – Halls Crossroads, Knoxville	Western end of SR 33 overlap
Union	Maynardville			SR 144 west (Hickory Star Road) – Hickory Star	Western end of SR 144 overlap
Union	Maynardville			SR 144 east (Ailor Gap Road) – Plainview	Eastern end of SR 144 overlap
Union	Maynardville			SR 33 (Maynardville Highway) – New Tazewell	Eastern end of SR 33 overlap
Union				SR 370 south (Bull Run Road)	Northern terminus of SR 370
Union	Luttrell			SR 131 north – Washburn	Western end of SR 131 overlap
Union	Luttrell			SR 131 south – Plainview, Knoxville	Eastern end of SR 131 overlap
Knox	Corryton			SR 331 south (Washington Pike) – Knoxville, Corryton	Northern terminus of SR 331
Grainger	Blaine	81.67	131.44	US 11W (Rutledge Pike/SR 1) – Rutledge, Mascot, Knoxville	Eastern terminus; SR 61 ends as a secondary route
1.000 mi = 1.609 km; 1.000 km = 0.621 mi: Concurrency terminus; Incomplete access

== See also ==
- List of Tennessee state highways
