= Tennessee State Route 370 =

State highway in Tennessee, United States

State Route 370
- TN 370 highlighted in red

Route information
- Maintained by TDOT
- Length: 5.8 mi (9.3 km)
- Existed: July 1, 1983–present

Major junctions
- South end: SR 144 near Plainview
- North end: SR 61 near Maynardville

Location
- Country: United States
- State: Tennessee
- Counties: Union

Highway system
- Tennessee State Routes; Interstate; US; State
← SR 369	→ SR 371

State Route 370 (SR 370) is a 5.8-mile-long (9.3 km) north–south state highway in Union County, Tennessee. It connects the community of Potato Valley with the cities of Plainview and Maynardville.

== Route description ==
SR 370 begins just northwest of Plainview at an intersection with SR 144. It goes northeast as an unnamed roadway between two ridges before joining Bull Run Road after crossing a ridge. The highway, now known as Bull Run Road, goes down a valley as it passes through the community of Potato Valley. SR 370 then leaves the community and continues northeast through farmland to come to an end at an intersection with SR 61 just southeast of Maynardville. The entire route of SR 370 is a rural two-lane highway.

== Major intersections ==
The entire route is in Union County.

Location	mi	km	Destinations	Notes
	0.0	0.0	SR 144 (Ailor Gap Road) – Plainview, Maynardville	Southern terminus
	5.8	9.3	SR 61 (Clinch Valley Road) – Maynardville, Luttrell	Northern terminus
1.000 mi = 1.609 km; 1.000 km = 0.621 mi
