= Tennessee State Route 131 =

State highway in Tennessee, United States

State Route 131
- SR 131 highlighted in red

Route information
- Maintained by TDOT
- Length: 68.8 mi (110.7 km)

Major junctions
- South end: US 11 / US 70 in Farragut
- I-40 / I-75 at Knoxville; US 25W in Powell; I-75 in Powell; US 441 in Halls Crossroads; US 25E in Thorn Hill
- North end: SR 31 in Treadway

Location
- Country: United States
- State: Tennessee
- Counties: Knox, Union, Grainger, Hancock

Highway system
- Tennessee State Routes; Interstate; US; State
← SR 130	→ SR 133

State Route 131 (SR 131) is a south-to-north highway in the U.S. state of Tennessee that is 68.8 miles (110.7 km) long. It is designated as a secondary route.

Local names for the roads followed by portions of the route are Lovell Road, Ball Camp-Byington Road, Beaver Ridge Road, Emory Road, Powell Drive, Tazewell Pike, Clinch Valley Road, and Mountain Valley Highway 131.

== Route description ==
=== Knox County ===
SR 131 begins in Knox County on the Farragut/Knoxville city line, at an intersection with US 11/US 70/SR 1 (Kingston Pike). It then goes north to enter Knoxville as a 4-lane (Lovell Road) and comes to an intersection with Parkside Drive, which provides access to the Turkey Creek shopping area. It then curves to the northwest and goes through a small business district before having an interchange with I-40/I-75 (Exit 374). SR 131 continues north through an industrial area before leaving Knoxville and continuing north, passing by various subdivisions. It then comes to an interchange with SR 162 (Pellissippi Parkway) before narrowing to a 2-lane. It then passes some more subdivisions before coming to an intersection with SR 169 (Middlebrook Pike), with that highway ending here and SR 131 taking over its route for a short distance to the west, again as a 4-lane, before turning north on Byington Beaver Ridge Road as a narrow 2-lane country road. SR 131 then makes a sharp switchback under a low and narrow railroad overpass before entering Karns and coming to an intersection with SR 62 (Oak Ridge Highway). It then goes northwest for a short distance before making a sharp turn onto Emory Road and becoming a wider and improved 2-lane. SR 131 then leaves Karns and continues through the countryside of northern Knox County before entering Powell and having an intersection and becoming concurrent with US 25W/SR 9 (Clinton Highway). They go southeast and cross Beaver Creek over a bridge and pass several businesses before SR 131 splits off onto Powell Drive. It then passes through farmland, passing by Crown College, before meeting back up with Emory Road and following it once again continue northeast. They then enter another business district and come to another interchange with I-75 (Exit 112) before passing by North Knoxville Medical Center and more subdivisions before leaving Powell. SR 131 then goes through some farmland and countryside before entering Halls Crossroads (Halls) and coming to an intersection with US 441/SR 71 (Norris Freeway, which is not an actual freeway). SR 131 turns southeast on Norris Freeway then intersects with SR 33 (Maynardville Pike). It turns north for a short distance, then turns again onto Emory Rd traveling northeast. It passes some more businesses before leaving Halls Crossroads and continuing northeast through the countryside as an improved 2-lane. SR 131 then enters Corryton and at Unincorporated Gibbs (Harbinsons Crossroads) comes to an intersection with SR 331 (Tazewell Pike). At this intersection SR 131 and SR 331 actually swap routes, with SR 131 taking over Tazewell Pike and going north and SR 331 taking over Emory Road and going east into the center of Corryton. SR 131 then becomes a little curvy as it finally leaves Knox County and Corryton to enter Union County.

=== Union County ===
SR 131 stays curvy and narrow as it immediately enters Plainview and intersects SR 144 (Ailor Gap Road). It then passes through Plainview before coming to an intersection and becoming concurrent with SR 61 (Main Street) just north of Luttrell. SR 61 and SR 131 split a short distance later and SR 131 (now as Clinch Valley Road) continues east and crosses into Grainger County.

=== Grainger County ===
Still a narrow country 2-lane, SR 131 travels through the farmland of a narrow valley, through the community of Powder Springs, passes just south of the communities of Tater Valley and Liberty Hill, and goes through the town of Washburn before coming to an intersection with US 25E/SR 32 (Dixie Highway) in Thorn Hill. SR 131 then continues east (now as Mountain Valley Highway 131) through some more rolling farmland before crossing into Hancock County.

=== Hancock County ===
It then continues through more farmland before entering Treadway and ending at an intersection with SR 31 (Flat Gap Road), where the road continues east as Mountain Valley Road.

== Junction list ==
County	Location	mi	km	Destinations	Notes
Knox	Farragut	0.0	0.0	US 11 / US 70 (Kingston Pike/SR 1) – Lenoir City, Kingston	Southern terminus
Knox	Knoxville			I-40 / I-75 – Knoxville, Chattanooga, Nashville	I-40/75 exit 374
Knox				SR 162 (Pellissippi Parkway) – Oak Ridge, Alcoa, Maryville	Interchange
Knox				SR 169 east (Middlebrook Pike)	Western terminus of SR 169
Knox	Karns			SR 62 (Oak Ridge Highway) – Oak Ridge, Knoxville	
Knox	Powell			US 25W north (Clinton Highway/SR 9 north) – Clinton	Begin concurrency with US 25W & SR 9
Knox	Powell			US 25W south (Clinton Highway/SR 9 south) – Knoxville	End concurrency with US 25W & SR 9
Knox	Powell			I-75 – Knoxville, Lexington, KY	I-75 exit 112
Knox	Halls Crossroads			US 441 (Norris Freeway/SR 71) – Norris, Knoxville	Begin concurrency with US 441 & SR 71
Knox	Halls Crossroads			SR 33 (Maynardville Pike) – Maynardville	End concurrency with US 441 & SR 71
Knox	Corryton			SR 331 (Tazewell Pike / East Emory Road) – Corryton, Blaine, Knoxville	
Union	Plainview			SR 144 west (Ailor Gap Road) – Maynardville	Eastern terminus of SR 144
Union	Luttrell			SR 61 east (Main Street) – Blaine	Begin concurrency with SR 61
Union	Luttrell			SR 61 west (Clinch Valley Road) – Maynardville, Tazewell	End concurrency with SR 61
Grainger	Thorn Hill			US 25E south (SR 32) – Bean Station, Morristown	Southern end of short concurrency with US 25E
Grainger	Thorn Hill			US 25E north (SR 32) – Tazewell, Cumberland Gap	Northern end of short concurrency with US 25E
Hancock	Treadway	68.8	110.7	SR 31 (Flat Gap Road) – Sneedville, Mooresburg	Northern terminus; road continues as Mountain Valley Road
1.000 mi = 1.609 km; 1.000 km = 0.621 mi: Concurrency terminus
