= Bethel, Tennessee =

Bethel, Tennessee may refer to:

- Bethel, Anderson County, Tennessee
- Bethel, Perry County, Tennessee
