= Tennessee State Route 31 =

State highway in Tennessee, United States

State Route 31
- TN 31 mainline in red

Route information
- Maintained by TDOT
- Length: 17.2 mi (27.7 km)
- Existed: October 1, 1923–present

Major junctions
- South end: US 11W in Mooresburg
- North end: SR 33 / SR 66 in Sneedville

Location
- Country: United States
- State: Tennessee
- Counties: Hawkins, Hancock

Highway system
- Tennessee State Routes; Interstate; US; State
| ← US 31A | → SR 32 |

State Route 31 (SR 31) is a 17.2-mile-long (27.7 km) north-south state highway in northeastern Tennessee. The highway runs from U.S. Route 11W (US 11W) in Mooresburg north to SR 66 in Sneedville.

== Route description ==
SR 31 begins at a junction with US 11W/SR 1 in Mooresburg. The highway heads north into rural Hawkins County, passing through the community of Spruce Pine. While crossing over Clinch Mountain, the route crosses into Hancock County. Past the mountain ridge, the highway intersects SR 131 in Treadway and briefly becomes a four-laned undivided Highway and continues northward through Luther and Duck Creek before turning northeast along the Clinch River. The route then enters Sneedville, where it terminates at SR 66, which connects to SR 33 and Sneedville via a bridge.

The entire route of SR 31 is a narrow rural 2-lane mountain highway.

== Junction list ==
| County | Location | mi | km | Destinations | Notes |
|---|---|---|---|---|---|
| Hawkins | Mooresburg | 0.0 | 0.0 | US 11W (Lee Highway/SR 1) – Bean Station, Rogersville | Southern terminus |
| Hancock | Treadway | 8.9 | 14.3 | SR 131 south (Mountain Valley Highway 131) – Thorn Hill, Washburn, Luttrell | Northern terminus of SR 131 |
| Hancock | Sneedville | 17 | 27 | SR 66 south – Rogersville | Southern end of SR 66 concurrency |
| Hancock | Sneedville | | | Hancock County Veterans Memorial Bridge over Clinch River | |
| Hancock | Sneedville | 17.2 | 27.7 | SR 33 – Sneedville, Tazewell | Northern terminus of SR 31 and SR 66 |
1.000 mi = 1.609 km; 1.000 km = 0.621 mi
