= Treadway, Tennessee =

Unincorporated community in Tennessee, US

Treadway is an unincorporated community in Hancock County in the U.S. state of Tennessee.

== Geography ==
Treadway is located at 36°25′07″N 83°13′28″W.

Treadway is located at the junction of Tennessee State Routes 31 and 131.
