= Marlow, Tennessee =

Marlow
- Unincorporated community
- Location within the state of Tennessee Marlow (the United States)
- Coordinates: 36°3′48″N 84°14′34″W
- Country: United States
- State: Tennessee
- County: Anderson
- Elevation: 850 ft (260 m)
- Time zone: UTC-5 (Eastern (EST))
  - Summer (DST): UTC-4 (EDT)
- GNIS feature ID: 1292708

Marlow is an unincorporated community in Anderson County, Tennessee.

Marlow is in the valley of Poplar Creek, between Clinton to the northeast and Oliver Springs to the southwest. Oak Ridge is south of Marlow. Tennessee State Route 61 runs through the Marlow community.

Marlow is the home of the Marlow Volunteer Fire Department, which serves a 65-square-mile (170 km^{2}) area with nearly 10,000 residents outside the Oliver Springs, Clinton, and Oak Ridge city limits.
