= Bethel, Anderson County, Tennessee =

Unincorporated community in Tennessee, US

Coordinates: 36.172°N 84.076°W

Bethel is an unincorporated community in Anderson County, Tennessee.

Bethel is between Clinton and Norris along Tennessee State Route 61.

The Museum of Appalachia is in Bethel.
