= Bethel, Perry County, Tennessee =

Bethel
- Unincorporated community
- Location within the state of Tennessee Bethel (the United States)
- Coordinates: 35°35′18″N 87°50′37″W
- Country: United States
- State: Tennessee
- County: Perry
- Elevation: 571 ft (174 m)
- Time zone: UTC-6 (Central (CST))
  - Summer (DST): UTC-5 (CDT)
- GNIS feature ID: 1277095

Bethel is an unincorporated community in Perry County, Tennessee, three miles south of the town of Linden. The community is home to a Methodist church and a cemetery dating from the late 19th century. Tennessee State Route 13 formerly passed through the community.
