= Halls Crossroads, Tennessee =

Halls Crossroads Halls
- CDP
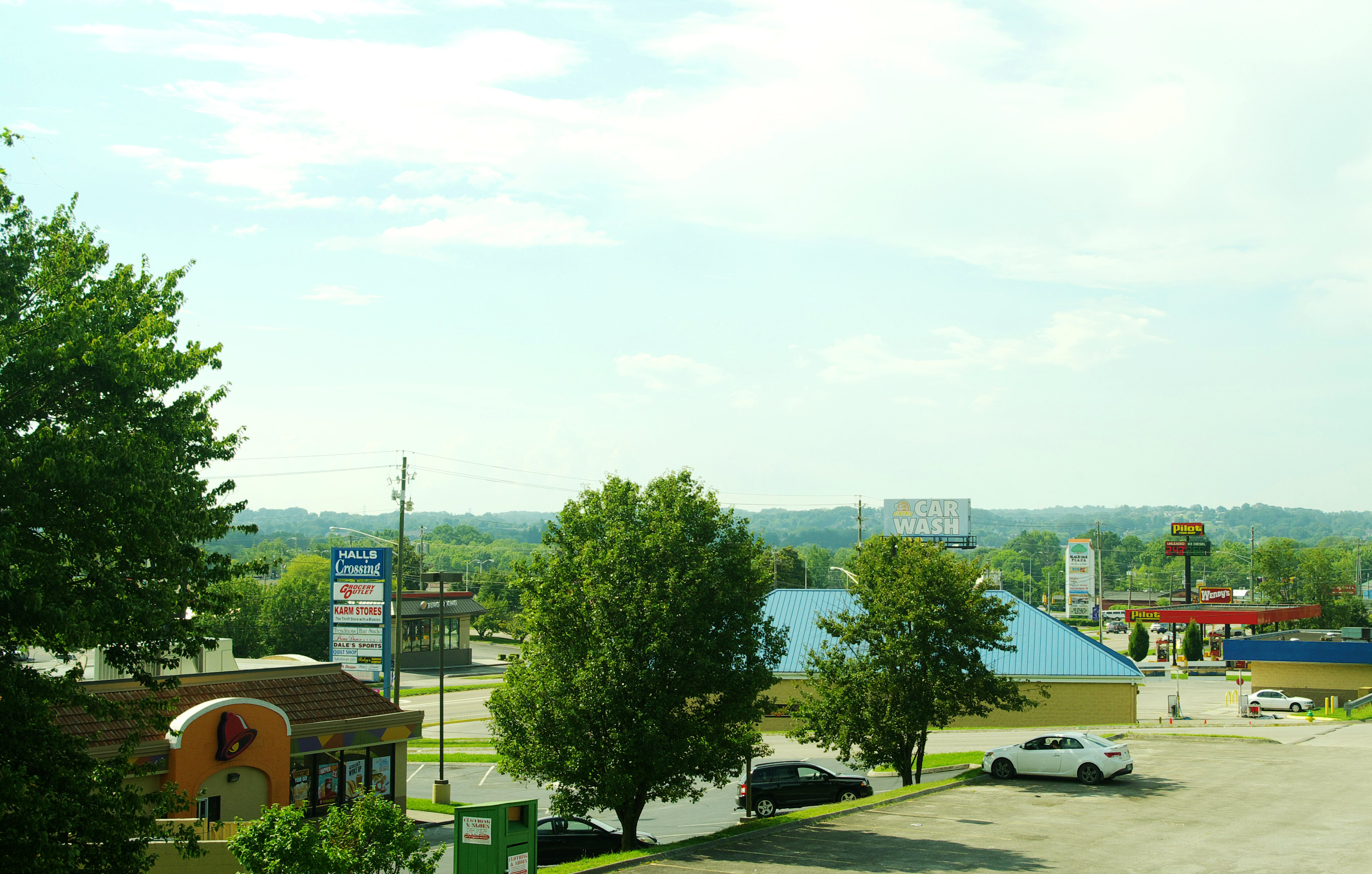
- Motto: "Halls has it"
- Location in Tennessee and the United States Halls Crossroads (the United States)
- Coordinates: 36°04′49″N 83°56′33″W
- Country: United States
- State: Tennessee
- County: Knox
- Settled: 1796
- Founder: Thomas Hall
- Named for: Thomas Hall

Government
  - Type: County commission
  - Mayor: Glenn Jacobs (R)
  - Commissioners: Rhonda Lee (R) (District 7); Kim Frazier (R) (At-Large); Larsen Jay (R) (At-Large)
- Elevation: 1,030 ft (310 m)

Population
  - Total: 10,341
- Time zone: UTC-5 (Eastern (EST))
  - Summer (DST): UTC-4 (EDT)
- ZIP Code: 37918, 37938
- Area code: 865
- GNIS feature ID: 2804634

Halls Crossroads (known locally as Halls) is a census-designated place in northern Knox County, Tennessee. As a northern suburb of nearby Knoxville, Halls is included in the Knoxville Metropolitan Statistical Area. The town takes its name from the Thomas Hall family that settled in the area in the late 18th century.

The population at the 2020 census was 10,341.

== History ==
In 1785, the North Carolina General Assembly passed a bill instructing militiamen to cut and clear a road by the most eligible route to Nashville at least ten feet wide and fit for passage of wagons and carts. This road is now known as Emory Road, which runs along a stretch of Tennessee State Route 131 in the Halls Crossroads area. One of the earliest settlers was Thomas Hall who arrived in the valley around 1796 from Orange County, North Carolina. Hall married Nancy Hais on September 25, 1783, two years after his release from a British prisoner of war camp in Charleston, South Carolina. He fought for freedom and was captured by the British in the Siege of Charleston. For this service the U.S. government presented Hall a parcel of land. It is to this northern side of Black Oak Ridge that Hall settled.

Two generations later Thomas Hall's grandson Pulaski went west during the California Gold Rush and settled on a ranch in Oregon. He returned to Halls and married Joyce Hall, September 8, 1859. Pulaski and his family owned and operated one of the first businesses in the Halls area as early as 1860, which included a general store and inn as well as a blacksmith shop. The store was known as Halls Crossroads due to its location at the crossroads of Emory Road and Maynardville Pike, giving the basis for the name behind the unincorporated town. The name Halls Crossroads would be officially recognized by the state of Tennessee for the community, in order to prevent confusion with Halls in Lauderdale County, an incorporated town.

Halls High School was one of the first schools in the area. Founded in 1916, the school was named for Pulaski Hall.

As of the present day, Halls Crossroads has grown into an unincorporated suburban town, with many occupied and unoccupied greyfields. With the recent annexations of land extending near Halls Crossroads, any proposal to annex the community would face conflict from its residents. In the early 2010s, plans were proposed for the redevelopment of many of the community's vacant commercial sites, including a mixed-use town centre, an urban farm, and a greenway system.

== Geography ==
Halls Crossroads is located in the Ridge-and-Valley Appalachians, which are characterized by long, narrow ridges that run in a northeast–southwest direction. The community is nestled between several such ridges, most notably Black Oak Ridge and Beaver Ridge, which divide Halls Crossroads from Fountain City to the south. Along with Fountain City, adjacent communities include Powell to the west, Corryton to the east, and the city of Maynardville to the north. Halls is drained by the Beaver Creek Watershed. Beaver Creek runs through the center of Halls Crossroads, and parallel to State Route 131, known locally as Emory Road, flowing 25 miles to the Clinch River.

It is located at 36°04′49″N 83°56′33″W. It has an elevation of 1,040 feet.

== Education ==
Knox County Schools operates six public schools in the Halls community including Halls Elementary School, Adrian Burnett Elementary School, Brickey-McCloud Elementary School, Halls High School, and Halls Middle School. Private schools nearby include Garden Montessori School, Temple Baptist Academy, Natures Way Montessori School, and St. Joseph School.

== Economy ==
The community is the site of the locally famous Halls Stockyards, a cattle auction facility.

Halls Crossroads is also home to numerous stores and restaurants.

== Infrastructure ==
Halls Crossroads is serviced by the Hallsdale-Powell Utility District and Knoxville Utilities Board, for wastewater, municipal water, and electricity respectively.

== Recreation ==
Nearby golf courses and country clubs include Beaver Brook Golf & Country Club, Three Ridges Golf Course, and Beverly Park Junior Golf Course. Halls Community Park features multiple ball fields, a playground, and a community center. The park is connected to the Halls Greenway, a hiking and biking trail that runs along Beaver Creek to the Halls Library. The Halls Senior Center features amenities like a computer center, a billiards room, conference rooms, arts and craft centers, and a community kitchen.

The John Sevier Hunter Education Center (JSHEC) is located on Rifle Range Road in Halls Crossroads. It is a multi-use facility managed by the Tennessee Wildlife Resources Agency for the public. The center provides Hunter Education classes and has various firearm and archery ranges.

Halls Crossroads is home to many large churches, most notably Beaver Dam Baptist Church, the oldest church in Knox County, and one of the oldest churches in the state of Tennessee.

== Notable people ==
- Michael L. Campbell, founder and chairman of Regal Entertainment Group
- Pete DeBusk, founder and chairman of DeRoyal Industries
- Chad Pennington, NFL quarterback
- Trevor Bayne, American NASCAR Sprint Cup Series and Nationwide Series racer.

== Media ==
- Shopper-News
- WMYL 96.7 FM
