= Andersonville, Tennessee =

Andersonville
- CDP
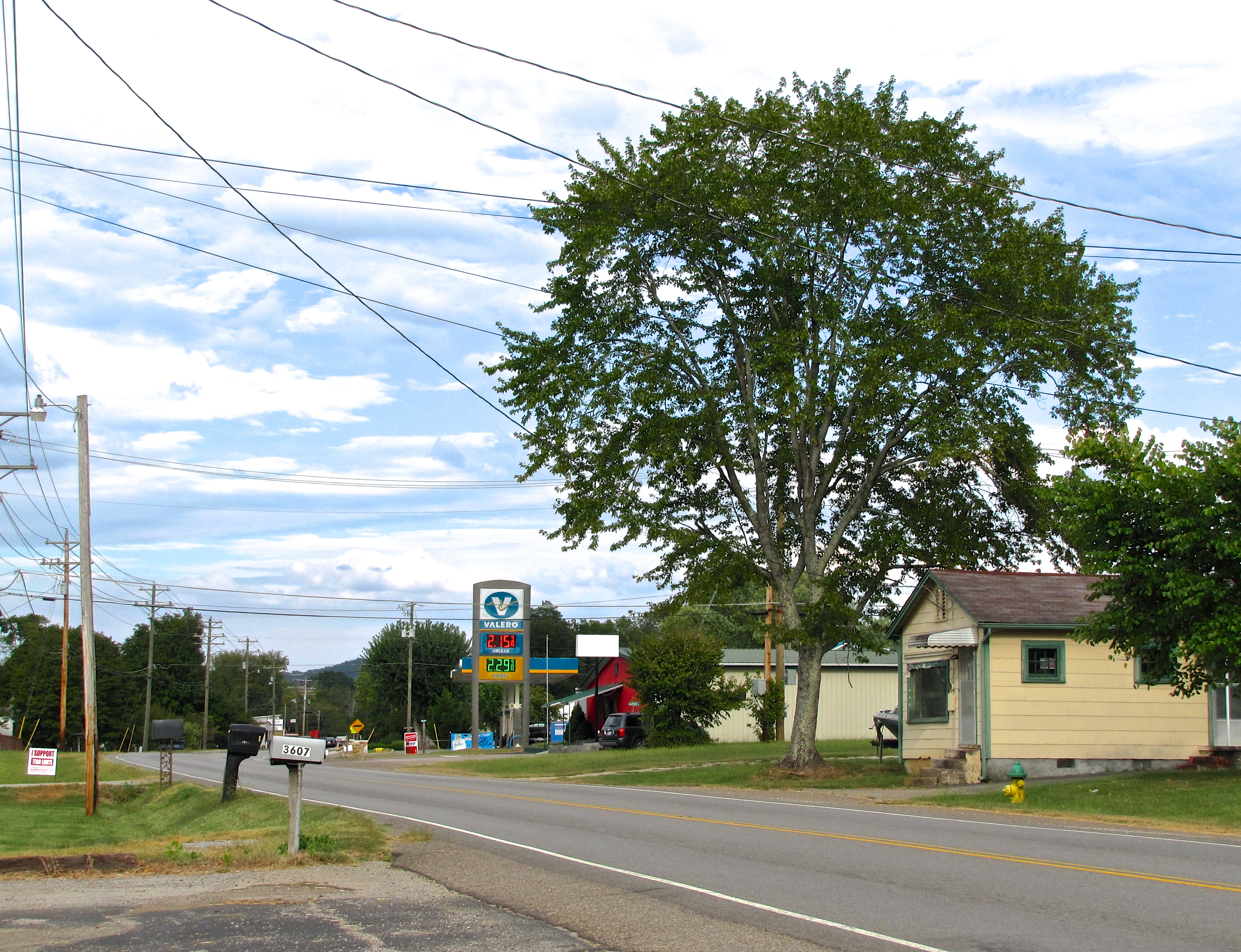
- SR 61 in Andersonville

- Location in Anderson County and the state of Tennessee
- Coordinates: 36°11′42″N 84°2′24″W
- Country: United States
- State: Tennessee
- County: Anderson

Area
  - Total: 1.62 sq mi (4.19 km^{2})
  - Land: 1.62 sq mi (4.19 km^{2})
  - Water: 0 sq mi (0.00 km^{2})
- Elevation: 968 ft (295 m)

Population (2020)
  - Total: 508
  - Density: 313.9/sq mi (121.19/km^{2})
- Time zone: UTC-5 (Eastern (EST))
  - Summer (DST): UTC-4 (EDT)
- ZIP codes: 37705
- FIPS code: 47-01220
- GNIS feature ID: 1307594

Andersonville is an unincorporated community in Anderson County, Tennessee. Beginning with the 2010 census, it is treated as a census-designated place (CDP). The CDP had a population of 508 in 2020.

Andersonville is located on Tennessee State Route 61 east of Norris and south of Norris Lake. The Andersonville post office is assigned ZIP code 37705, which includes much of northeastern Anderson County, portions of adjacent Union County and some of the city limits of Norris.

== History ==
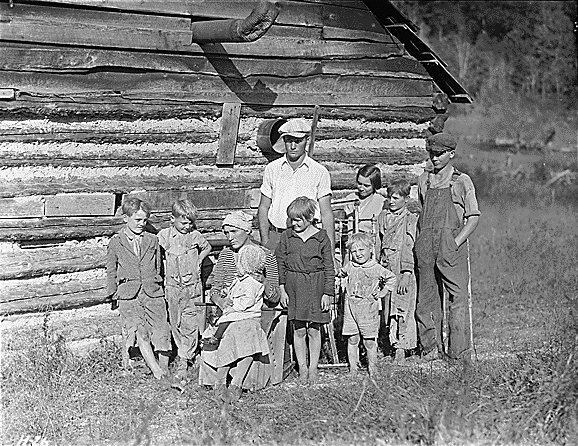
In 1933, during the construction of Norris Dam, Tennessee Valley Authority photographer Lewis Hine photographed this family living on a farm near Andersonville.

The community's founding family donated land for the community's first grade school, which was started in 1830. It was replaced in 1873 by Big Valley Academy, a grade school financed through purchases of ownership interests in the school by local citizens. It was renamed Andersonville Institute in 1898, after the Clinton Baptist Association purchased the school building and added high school grades. Andersonville Institute was served by a pair of dormitories for boarding students, who comprised the majority of the high school enrollment. The Anderson County School Board assumed ownership and responsibility for the school in 1923. In 1938, Andersonville's high school students were moved to the new Norris High School in Norris and Andersonville's school became an elementary school again. The old two-story school building was torn down in 1958 and replaced by a new single-story building on the same site that reopened three years later as Andersonville Elementary School.

== Demographics ==
Historical population
Census	Pop.	Note	%±
2020	508		—
U.S. Decennial Census

The 2010 census population of the Andersonville CDP was 472, including 366 people over 18 and 106 children under 18 years old. The population was 98.5% white, 0.4% Native American or Alaskan native, 0.2% Asian, 0.2% Native Hawaiian and Other Pacific Islander, 0.2% some other race, and 0.4% two or more races. The Hispanic or Latino population, including people of any race, totaled 1.5%.

== Climate ==
The climate in this area is characterized by hot, humid summers and generally mild to cool winters. According to the Köppen Climate Classification system, Andersonville has a humid subtropical climate, abbreviated "Cfa" on climate maps.
