= Plainview, Tennessee =

- City
- City of Plainview
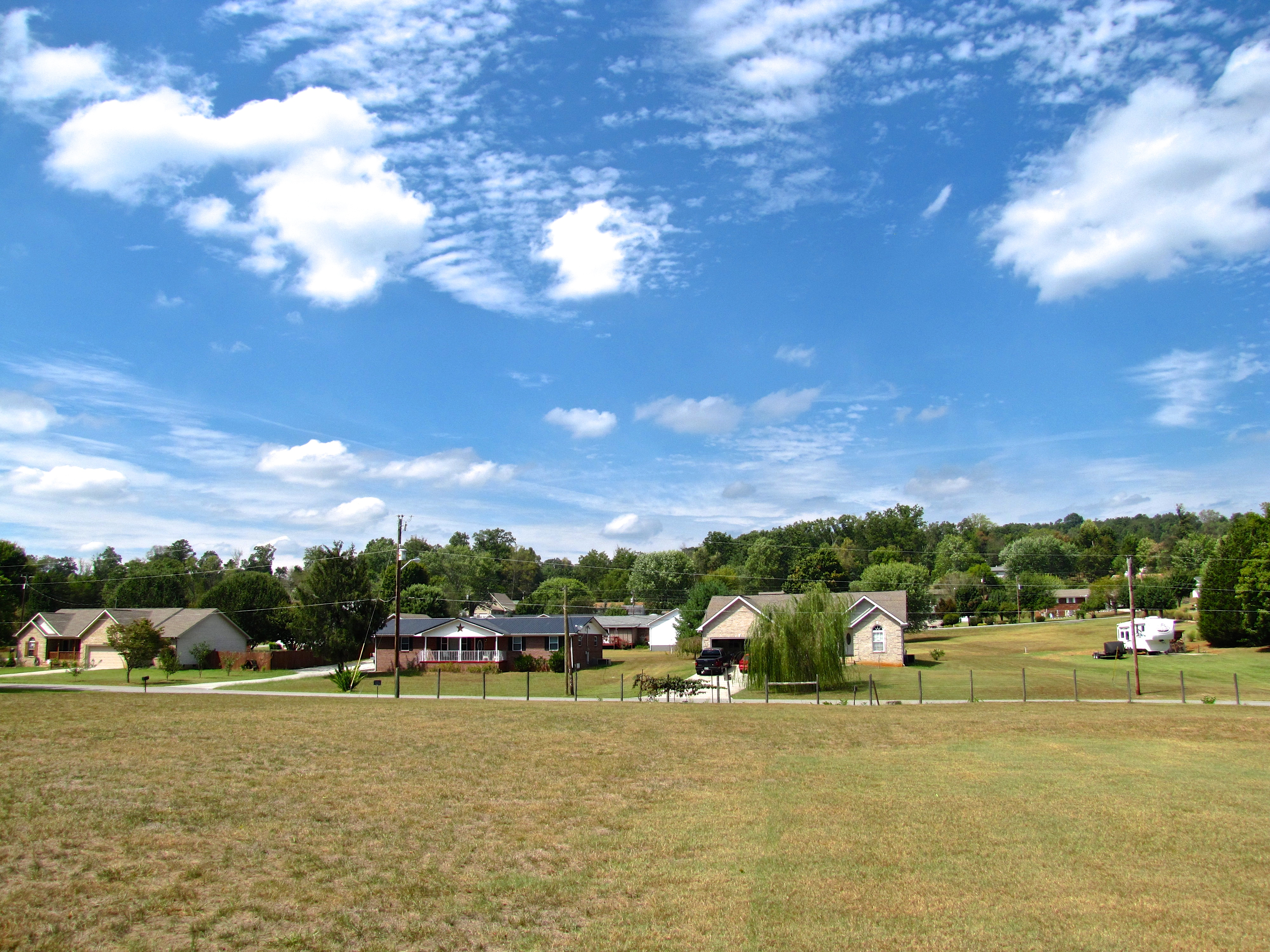
- Houses in Plainview

- Location of Plainview in Union County, Tennessee.

- Location within the state of Tennessee
- Coordinates: 36°10′35″N 83°47′46″W
- Country: United States
- State: Tennessee
- County: Union
- Incorporated: 1992

Government
  - Type: Mayor-council
  - Mayor: Gary Chandler
  - Vice Mayor: Richard Phillips
  - City Council: Councilmembers: Richard Phillips (also Vice Mayor); Gordon Bright; Josh Collins; Marilyn Toppins

Area
  - Total: 6.37 sq mi (16.49 km^{2})
  - Land: 6.37 sq mi (16.49 km^{2})
  - Water: 0 sq mi (0.00 km^{2})
- Elevation: 1,129 ft (344 m)

Population (2020)
  - Total: 2,060
  - Density: 323.5/sq mi (124.89/km^{2})
- Time zone: UTC-5 (Eastern (EST))
  - Summer (DST): UTC-4 (EDT)
- ZIP code: 37721, 37779
- FIPS code: 47-59020
- GNIS feature ID: 1652472

Plainview is a city in Union County, Tennessee, United States. As of the 2020 census, Plainview had a population of 2,060. It is included in the Knoxville, Tennessee Metropolitan Statistical Area. Plainview is located in the southern part of the county, south of Maynardville, the county seat.

== History ==
Plainview would emerge into a thriving community following volunteer efforts towards the community's school, which was built in the 1920s. The school would close in the mid-20th century, prompting residents to convert the building into a community center following the donation of the structure by the Union County Board of Education to the Plainview Community Club.

In 1981, the nearby city of Luttrell would establish proposed plans to annex the Plainview community, prompting community members to form an activist group and file a lawsuit against Luttrell in the Union County Chancery Court. The court would side in favor of Plainview, halting Luttrell from annexing the community, but would require the community to incorporate into a city in order to avoid the annexation into Luttrell. Plainview would incorporate into a city in 1992. The city government has subsequently paved many local streets, installed street lighting, enacted zoning, provided a mass recycling location and developed a walking trail.

== Geography ==
According to the United States Census Bureau, Plainview has a total area of 6.4 square miles (17 km^{2}), all land. The city is situated along the southern base of Copper Ridge, an elongate ridge characteristic of the Appalachian Ridge-and-Valley range. The Knox County line lies just to the south, and Luttrell borders the city to the northeast. House Mountain rises prominently to the south, and Clinch Mountain rises prominently to the east.

Tennessee State Routes 131 (Tazewell Pike) and 144 (Corryton Road) intersect in Plainview.

Plainview's City Hall is on Tazewell Pike.

== Demographics ==
Historical population
Census	Pop.	Note	%±
2000	1,866		—
2010	2,125		13.9%
2020	2,060		−3.1%

=== 2020 census ===
As of the 2020 census, Plainview had a population of 2,060, with 756 households and 547 families residing in the city. The median age was 42.1 years; 22.0% of residents were under the age of 18 and 17.9% of residents were 65 years of age or older. For every 100 females there were 93.2 males, and for every 100 females age 18 and over there were 92.2 males age 18 and over.

There were 787 households in Plainview, of which 35.3% had children under the age of 18 living in them. Of all households, 53.6% were married-couple households, 16.1% were households with a male householder and no spouse or partner present, and 22.5% were households with a female householder and no spouse or partner present. About 22.6% of all households were made up of individuals and 10.4% had someone living alone who was 65 years of age or older.

There were 846 housing units, of which 7.0% were vacant. The homeowner vacancy rate was 1.1% and the rental vacancy rate was 11.2%.

0.0% of residents lived in urban areas, while 100.0% lived in rural areas.

Racial composition as of the 2020 census
Race	Number	Percent
White	1,959	95.1%
Black or African American	10	0.5%
American Indian and Alaska Native	5	0.2%
Asian	2	0.1%
Native Hawaiian and Other Pacific Islander	2	0.1%
Some other race	28	1.4%
Two or more races	54	2.6%
Hispanic or Latino (of any race)	48	2.3%

=== 2000 census ===
As of the census of 2000, there was a population of 1,866, with 658 households and 532 families residing in the city. The population density was 289.2 inhabitants per square mile (111.7/km^{2}). There were 724 housing units at an average density of 112.2 per square mile (43.3/km^{2}). The racial makeup of the city was 98.23% White, 0.05% African American, 0.21% Native American, 0.59% Asian, 0.05% from other races, and 0.86% from two or more races. Hispanic or Latino of any race were 0.32% of the population. The three most common countries of origin are Mexico, El Salvador, and Germany. Ninety-nine percent of people living in the town are citizens.

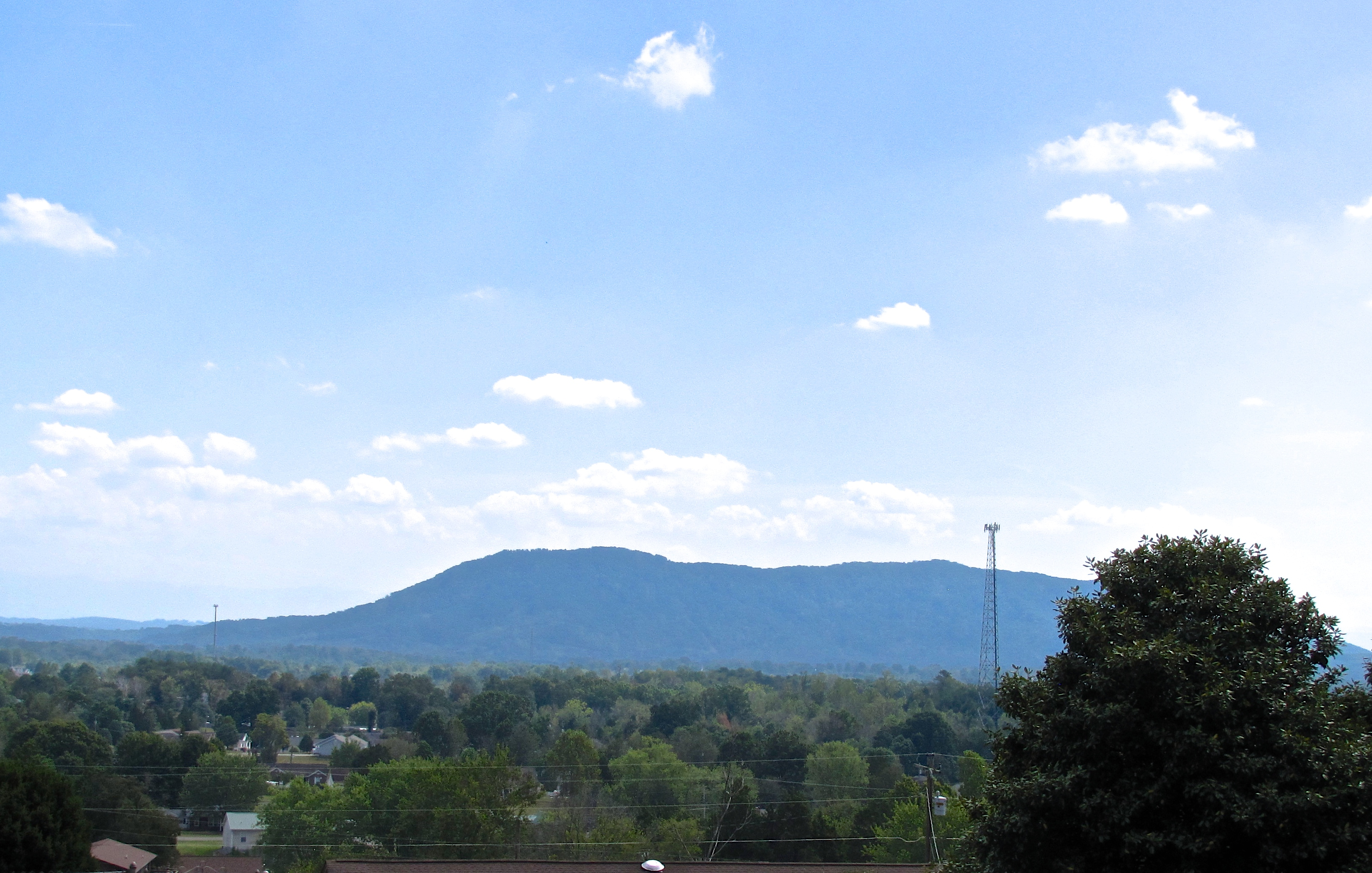
View across Plainview, with House Mountain in the distance

There were 658 households, out of which 43.9% had children under the age of 18 living with them, 66.3% were married couples living together, 9.7% had a female householder with no husband present, and 19.0% were non-families. 15.0% of all households were made up of individuals, and 3.8% had someone living alone who was 65 years of age or older. The average household size was 2.82 and the average family size was 3.11.

In the city, the population was spread out, with 29.0% under the age of 18, 10.0% from 18 to 24, 31.7% from 25 to 44, 22.1% from 45 to 64, and 7.2% who were 65 years of age or older. The median age was 32 years. For every 100 females, there were 96.6 males. For every 100 females age 18 and over, there were 96.1 males. The average age for people living in this city is higher than the Tennessee average, at 43.5 years. That compared to the state average of 38.7 years.

The median income for a household in the city was $39,659, and the median income for a family was $39,444. Males had a median income of $26,505 versus $19,375 for females. The per capita income for the city was $13,384. About 9.1% of families and 11.8% of the population were below the poverty line, including 15.3% of those under age 18 and 11.5% of those age 65 or over.

== Economy ==
The average income for someone living in Plainview is $39,659. The unemployment rate is 5.5%. The three most common occupations are administrative, production, and sales.

== Education ==
There are no schools in Plainview. K-5 students attend Luttrell Elementary School in Luttrell. 6-8 grade students attend Horace Maynard Middle School and 9-12 grade students attend Union County High School both in Maynardville.

== Postal service ==
Plainview does not have its own post office or zip code, so locations in the city are divided between Corryton and Luttrell mailing addresses.
