= Big Ridge State Park =

State park in Tennessee, United States

Coordinates: 36°15′36″N 83°55′21″W

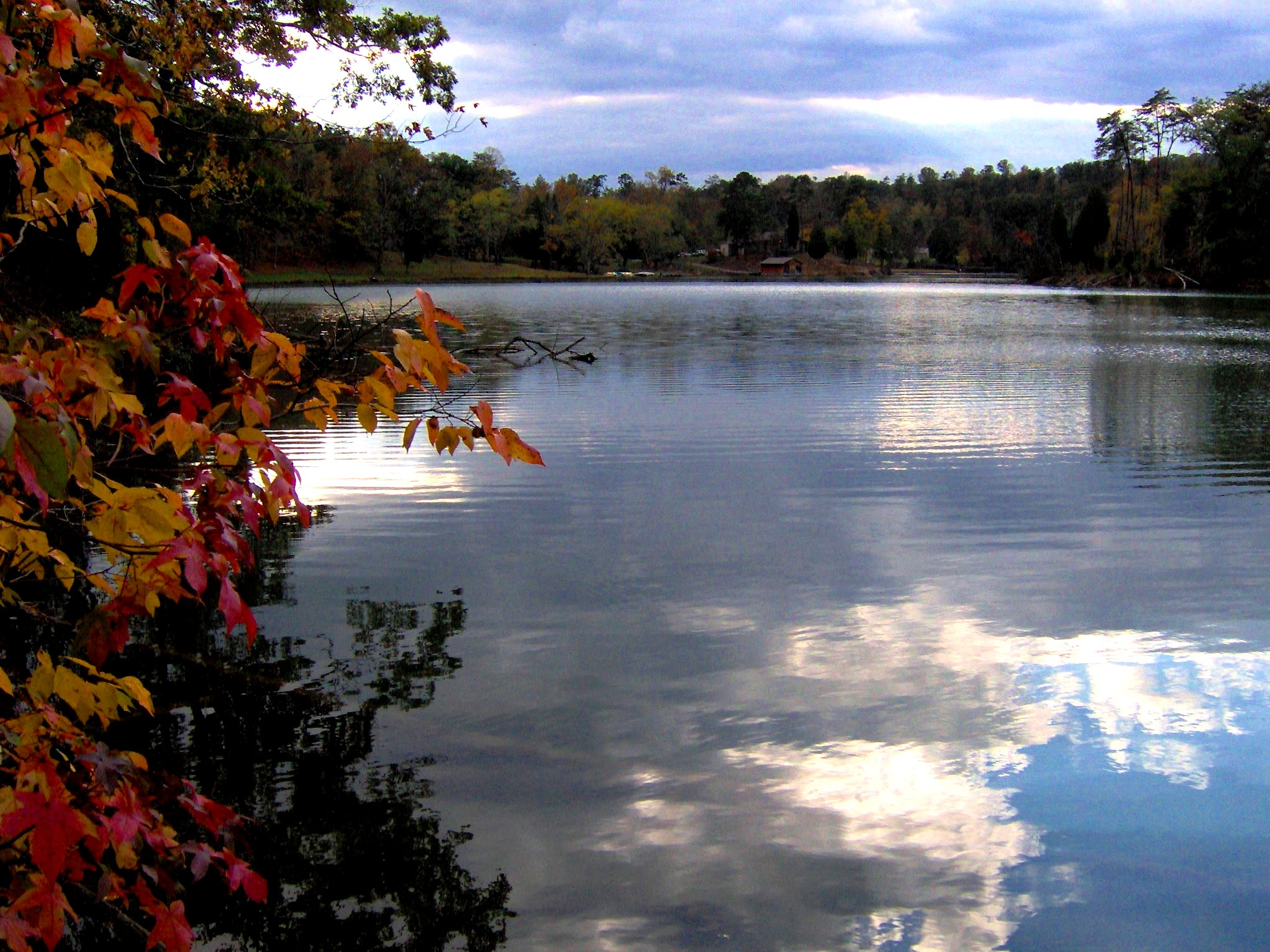
- Big Ridge Lake
- Interactive map of Big Ridge State Park
- Type: Tennessee State Park
- Location: Maynardville, Tennessee, United States
- Area: 3,687 acres (14.92 km^{2})
- Created: 1934
- Open: Year round
- Website: Official website

Big Ridge State Park is a state park in Union County, Tennessee, in the southeastern United States. The park consists of 3,687 acres (14.92 km^{2}) on the southern shore of the Norris Reservoir, an impoundment of the Clinch River created by the completion of Norris Dam in 1936. Much of the park's recreational focus is on Big Ridge Lake, a 45-acre (0.18 km^{2}) sub-impoundment of Norris near the center of the park.

Big Ridge State Park was first developed by the Tennessee Valley Authority (TVA), the National Park Service and the Civilian Conservation Corps (CCC) in the 1930s as part of the greater Norris Project. The park was one of three of the project's demonstration recreational areas that eventually became state parks (Norris Dam State Park and Cove Lake State Park are the other two). The park's recreational facilities opened in May 1934. The park is now operated and maintained by the Tennessee Department of Environment and Conservation.

== Geographical setting ==
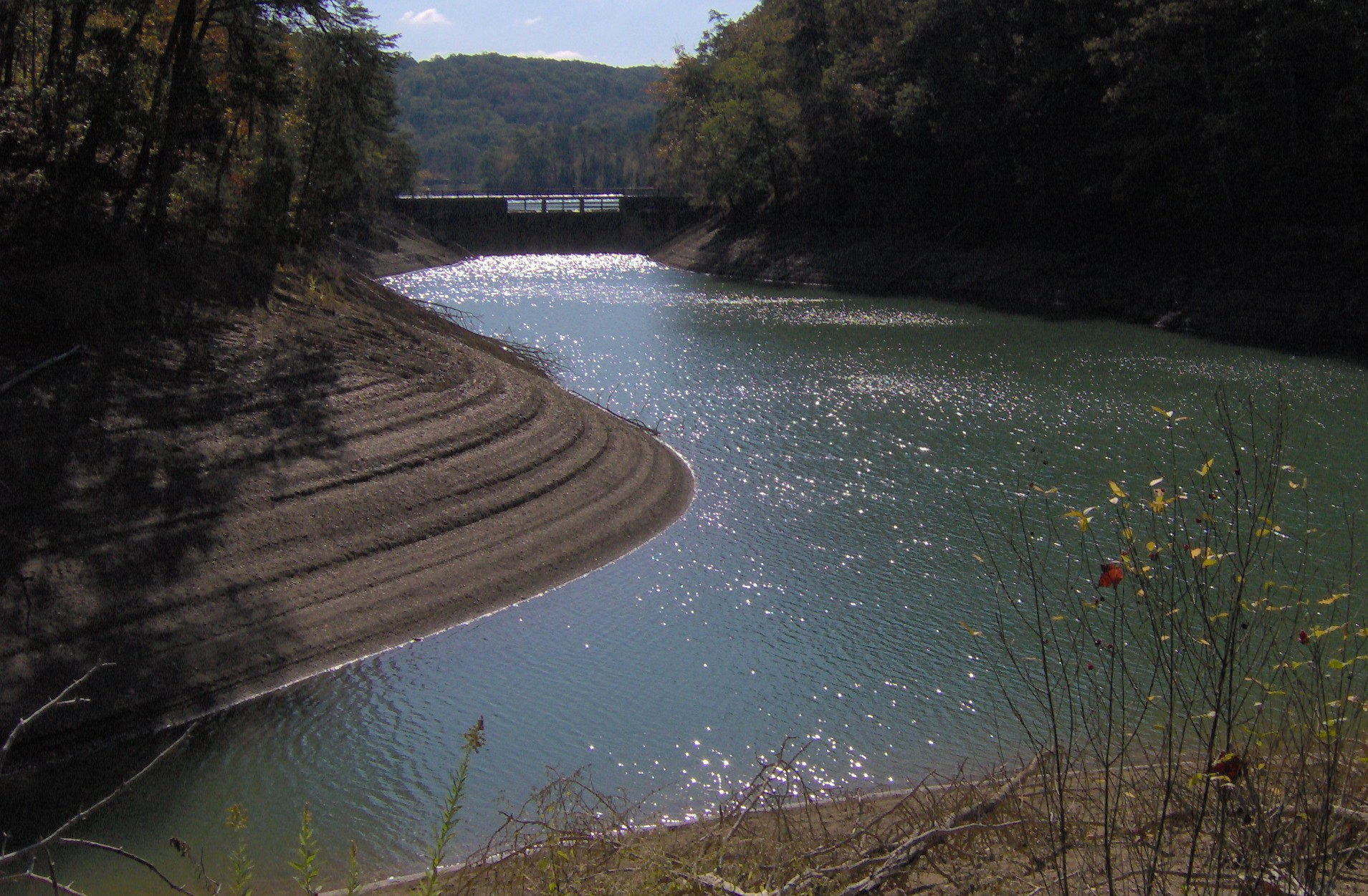
View across an inlet of Norris Lake toward Big Ridge Dam

Big Ridge State Park is located in the Appalachian Ridge-and-Valley range, which is characterized by narrow elongate ridges flanked by fertile stream valleys. The park's topography is dominated by three such ridge systems running roughly parallel to one another, the two northernmost of which are bisected by the Big Ridge Lake inlet of Norris Lake. The northernmost ridge is known as "Lone Mountain" west of the inlet and "Big Ridge" east of the inlet. The central ridge is known as "Bluebird Ridge" west of the inlet and "Pinnacle Ridge" east of the inlet. The southernmost ridge, which is not bisected by the inlet, is known as "Chestnut Ridge." The northern and central ridge systems are divided by Dark Hollow, a narrow valley that spans the entire park. The central and southern ridges are divided by a valley known as Blue Mud Valley west of the inlet and Poor Land Valley east of the inlet.

The Clinch River flows southwestward from its source in Virginia through much of northeastern Tennessee before emptying into the Tennessee River near Kingston. Norris Dam, located 80 miles (130 km) upstream from the Clinch's mouth, retains a reservoir that spans a 73-mile (117 km) stretch of the river and covers nearly 34,000 acres (140 km^{2}). Big Ridge State Park is located 99 miles (159 km) above the river's mouth, at the confluence of the Clinch River and Mill Creek. The two streams converge at a mile-wide section of the lake known as Loyston Sea, named after the community of Loyston which was once situated in the lower Mill Creek valley.

The water gap between Lone Mountain and Big Ridge became a narrow inlet with the creation of Norris Lake. The inlet, which joins the south side of Loyston Sea, stretches southward for just over a mile before forking at a knob known as Loyston Overlook. Big Ridge Dam, a 50-foot (15 m) spillway dam, impounds the eastern leg of this fork, forming the 45-acre (0.18 km^{2}) Big Ridge Lake.

=== Natural information ===
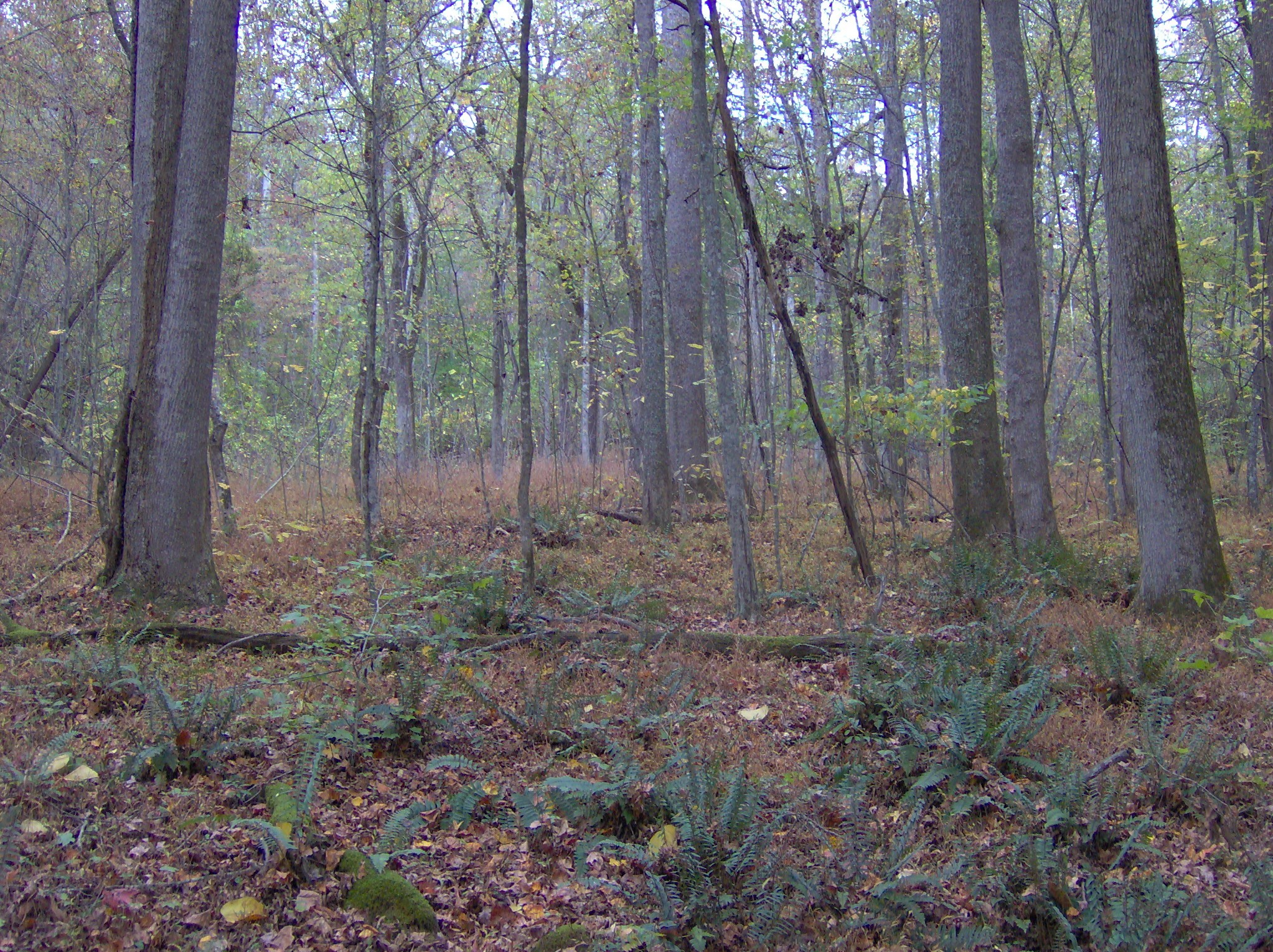
Young forest along the Ghost House Loop Trail

Like most of the Ridge-and-Valley province, Big Ridge State Park is underlain by early Paleozoic-age rocks created from ancient ocean sediments several hundred million years ago. Limestone formations are common in the valleys and hollows, whereas more resistant sandstone and shale formations are common along the ridges. Dolomitic limestone caps are occasionally found on some of the more blunt ridgetops. The ridges themselves were created 200-300 million years during the Appalachian orogeny. The soil in the area is relatively shallow and early farmers considered it poor for growing crops.

Most of Big Ridge State Park is coated in a second-growth southern hardwood forest, with oak, hickory, tuliptree, and basswood being the most common species. Table mountain pine, shortleaf pine, and red cedar are found in drier areas and along ridge slopes. Wildlife species include white-tail deer, beaver, heron, and wood duck. Migrating bald eagles and golden eagles are occasionally spotted in winter. Big Ridge Lake is home to several species of fish, including bluegill, largemouth bass, spotted bass, crappie, flathead catfish, and freshwater drum.

== History ==
=== Early history ===
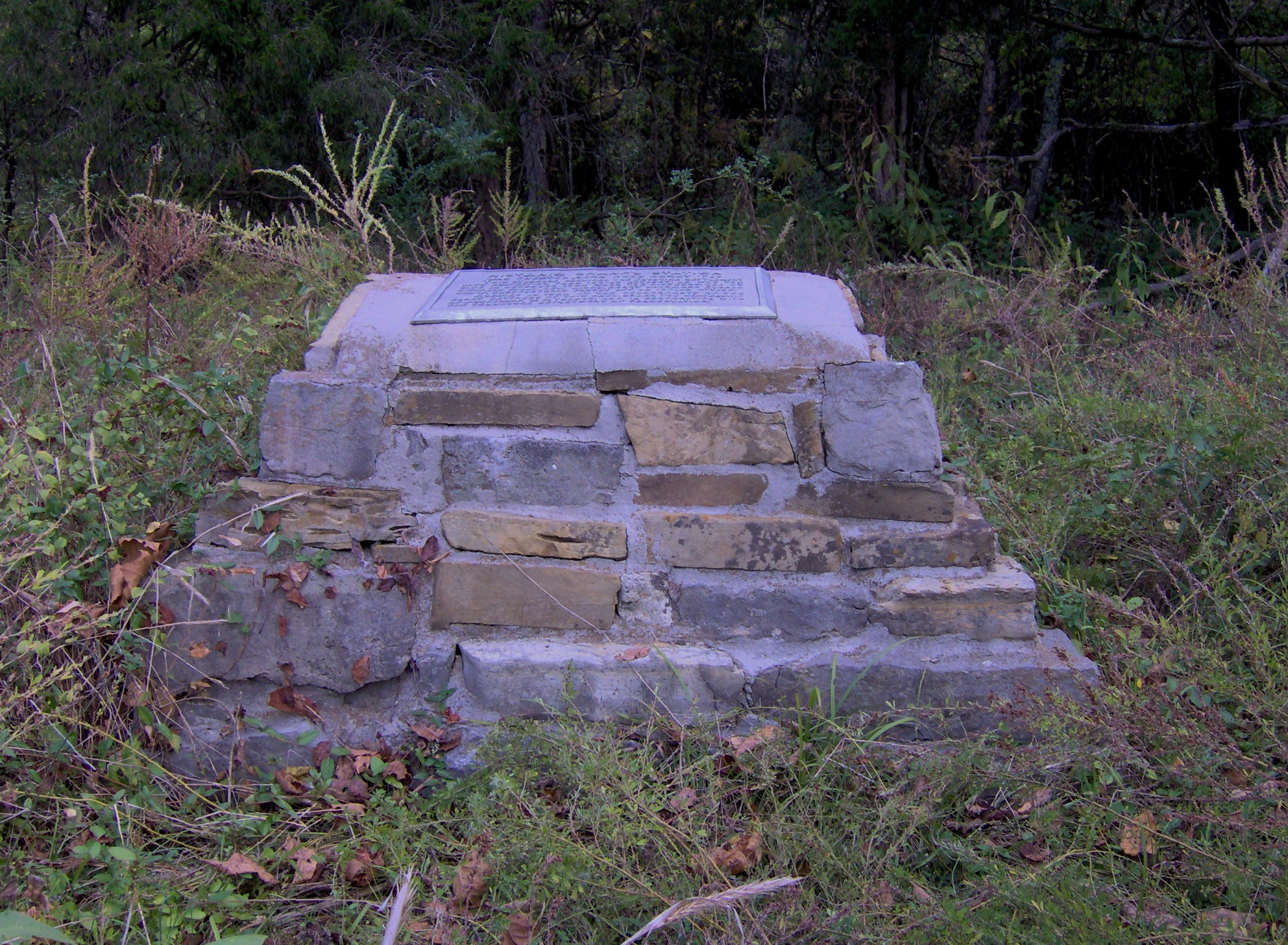
Sharp's Station monument at the end of the Sharp's Station Trail

In anticipation of the flooding of the Norris Basin in the 1930s, the Smithsonian Institution conducted an extensive archaeological survey of the region and located nearly two dozen prehistoric Native American sites. At a site known as the Hill Farm Stone Mounds approximately 2 miles (3.2 km) northeast of Loyston, excavators uncovered a townhouse with a clay seat and altar, a floor covered with sand and clay, and postholes suggesting that it was constructed using small upright logs thatched together with grass and cane. At the confluence of the Clinch and Powell rivers, approximately 5 miles (8.0 km) northwest of the present park boundary, archaeologists excavated a mound nearly 60 feet (18 m) in diameter. The excavation revealed a townhouse-like structure with a clay seat and a circular clay fireplace. These structures likely date to the Mississippian period (c. 1000-1500 AD). By the time the first European explorers arrived in the region in the 18th century, the Cherokee were in control of the area.

In 1761, a group of long hunters led by Elisha Walden hunted in the Clinch and Powell valleys from a station camp in southwestern Virginia. The long hunting expeditions of the 1760s were followed by a flood of settlers in the 1770s and 1780s. As trans-Appalachian migration increased in the waning years of the American Revolution, small forts sprang up throughout the Tennessee Valley to provide migrants with rest stops and protect local settlers from hostile Cherokee attacks. In the 1780s, a German pioneer named Henry Sharp (1735–1814) established Sharp's Station on the banks of the Clinch in what is now the northern section of Big Ridge State Park. Peter Graves, a settler living at Sharp's Station, was ambushed and killed atop Big Ridge in November 1794. Sharp's Station itself was attacked the following month, although the settlers successfully fought off the attackers. Sharp's descendants were still in possession of the land when TVA began buying up the property in the 1930s.

The community of Loyston (initially known as Loy's Crossroads), now under the lake just north of the park, was established by John Loy in the early 19th century. The Loy and Sharp families both operated iron furnaces using ore mined along Big Ridge, creating mostly tools and household items. By the early 20th century, Loyston had grown into a regional trading center for the Big Ridge area.

=== The Norris Project ===
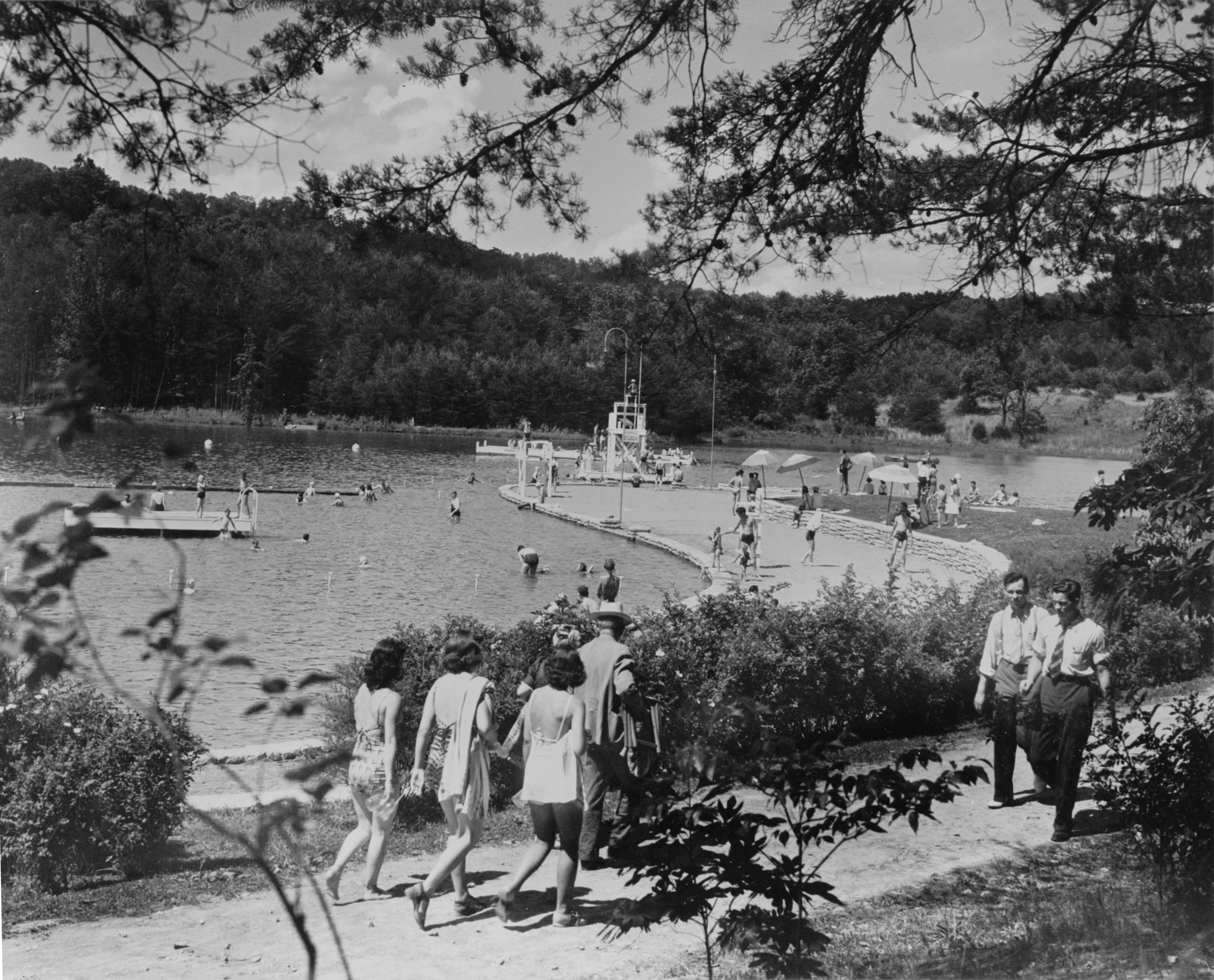
Recreation facilities on Big Ridge Lake, before 1945

Throughout the 1920s, various groups lobbied state and federal legislatures to gain funding for a dam at the confluence of Cove Creek and the Clinch River. The Cove Creek Project, as it was initially called, sought to bring electricity to the Clinch region and provide much needed flood control to the Tennessee Valley. When the newly created TVA took up the project in 1933, it renamed it after its chief advocate in Congress, Nebraska senator George Norris. Along with flood control and electricity, TVA sought to develop several recreational areas in order to demonstrate the recreational opportunities that would come with the creation of large reservoirs.

Civilian Conservation Corps Company 4495, which was originally based in Loyston, began work on Big Ridge State Park in October 1934. The CCC built several rustic cabins, the sandy beach, a lodge, and restored the c.-1825 Norton Gristmill. TVA and the CCC constructed Big Ridge Dam during this period so that the park would have a lake area not affected by seasonal drawdowns of the Norris Reservoir.

== The park today ==
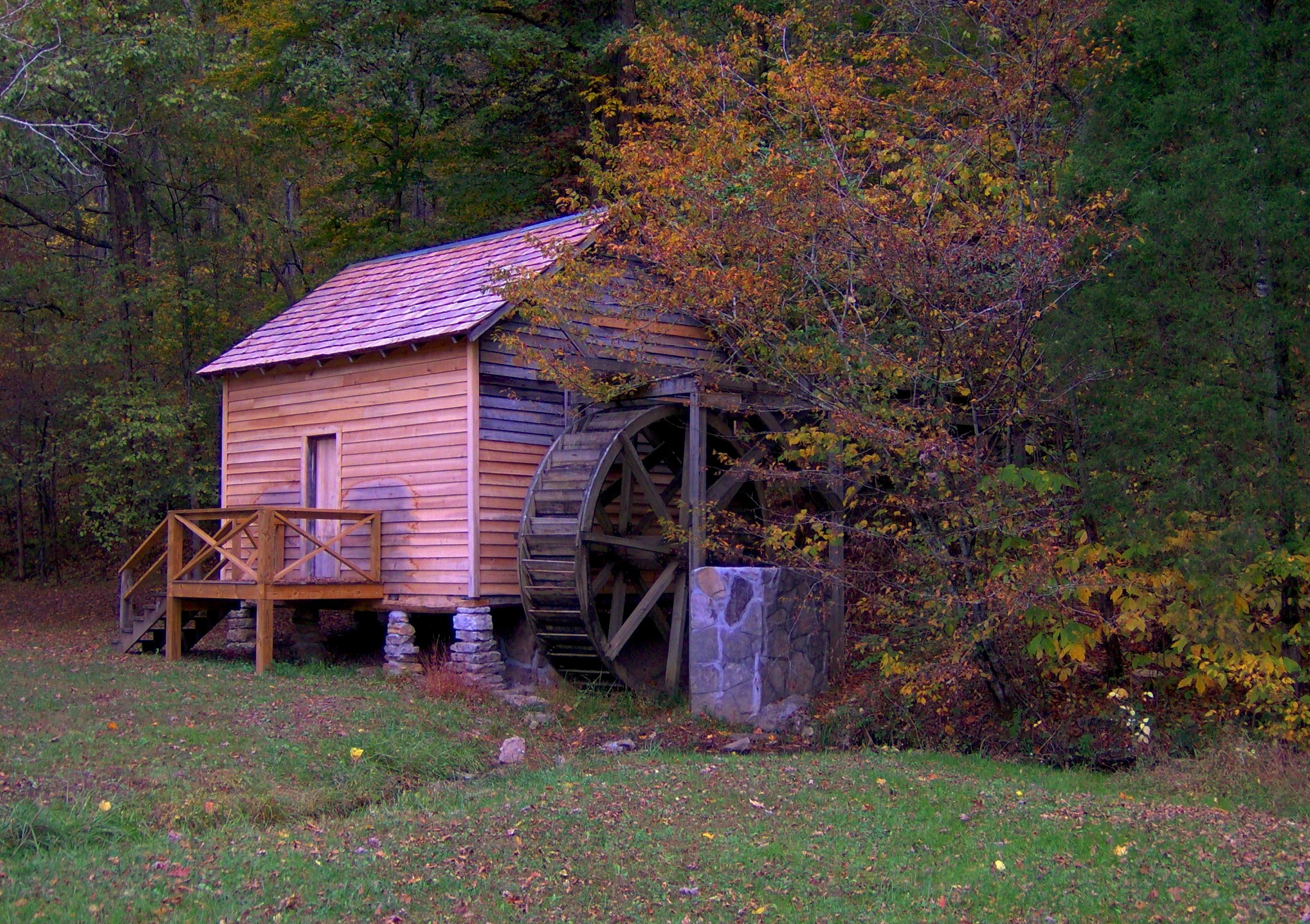
Norton Gristmill

Big Ridge State Park currently maintains a 50-site campground, 19 rustic cabins, a large group camp area, a meeting hall, and several athletic fields. The park's sandy beach, which is open during summer months, is a popular swimming area. While private boats are not allowed on Big Ridge Lake, the park maintains a boat launch along Norris Lake in the western section of the park. Annual events include an Easter egg hunt held the day before Easter, a Bluegrass music festival held the third Friday in August, a medieval tournament held in October by the Society for Creative Anachronism, and night hikes and ghost storytelling sessions led by park rangers on Friday and Saturday nights in October.

Over 15 miles (24 km) of hiking trails criss-cross the ridges and hollows connecting all sections of the park. The 1.5-mile (2.4 km) Lake Trail follows the shore of Big Ridge Lake, connecting the Visitor Center area with Big Ridge Dam. The trail provides access to Meditation Point— a small hill topped by a sheltered bench— and the Loyston Overlook. The 1.7-mile (2.7 km) Big Valley Trail follows an old road over Pinnacle Ridge, connecting the Norton Gristmill area with Dark Hollow. The West and East Dark Hollow trails traverse the entirety of Dark Hollow between Big Ridge and Pinnacle Ridge. The 2.6-mile (4.2 km) Indian Rock Loop crosses the crest of Big Ridge past Indian Rock before descending the steep northern slope of the ridge to the Sharp's Station area. The 1.2-mile (1.9 km) Ghost House Loop passes Norton Cemetery and an area traditionally believed to be haunted.

The Norton Gristmill is the park's most prominent historical feature. The mill was built in 1825 by Tink McCoy and later purchased by Lewis Norton. The mill is now mostly a replica, although the original mill race and millstones remain. Other historical features include Indian Rock, atop Big Ridge, where a plaque marks the site of the 1794 ambush of Peter Graves. A small monument at the now-disinterred Lon Sharp Cemetery in the northeast section of the park recalls the 18th-century Sharp's Station, which was believed to have been located near the cemetery. Norton Cemetery houses the grave of Maston Hutcheson (1826–1910), who according to local lore is responsible for hauntings in the area. A few minor remains of Hutcheson's house are still visible at the junction of the Ghost House Loop Trail and the Big Valley Trail connector.

== Photo gallery ==
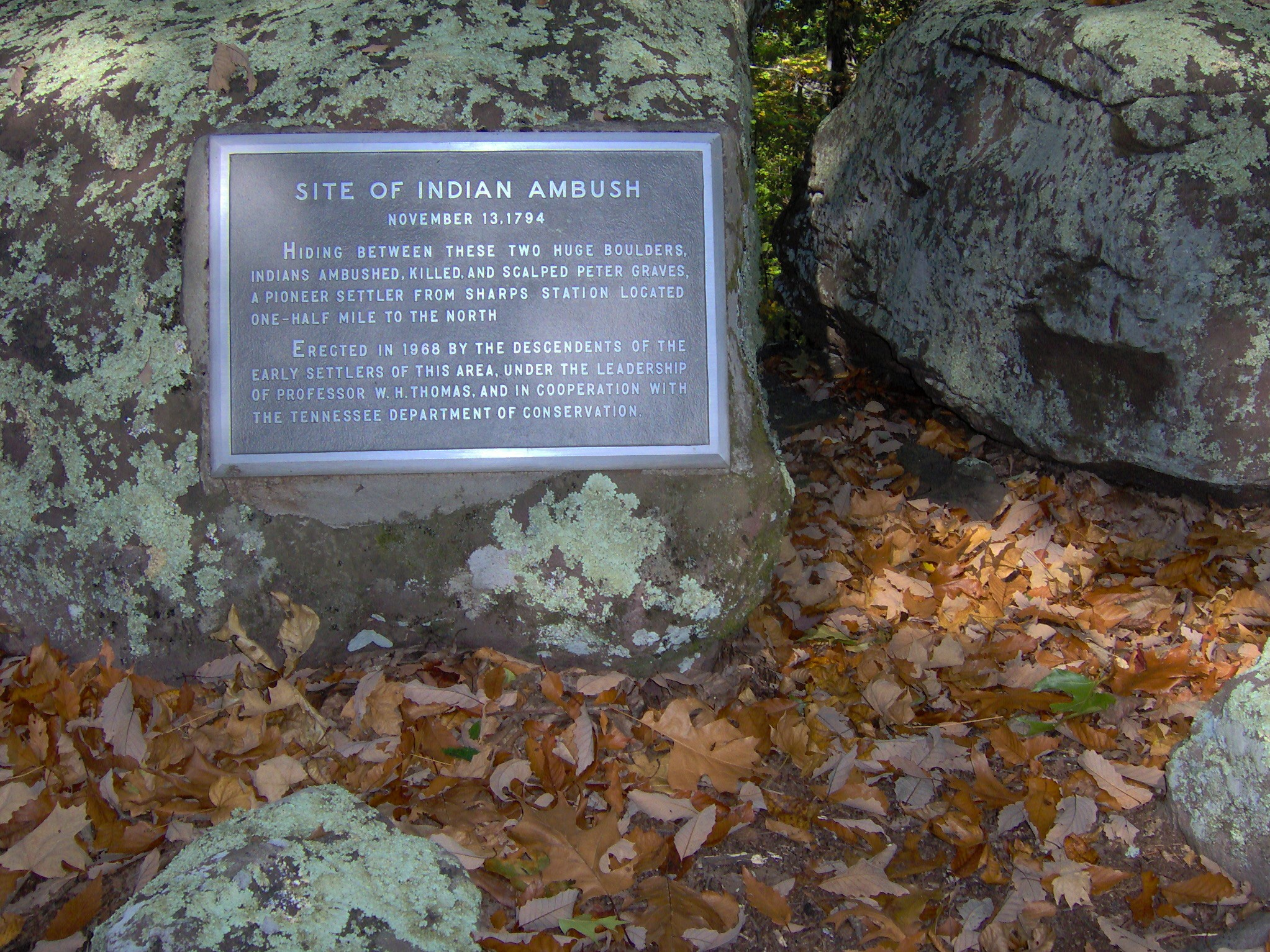
Indian Rock

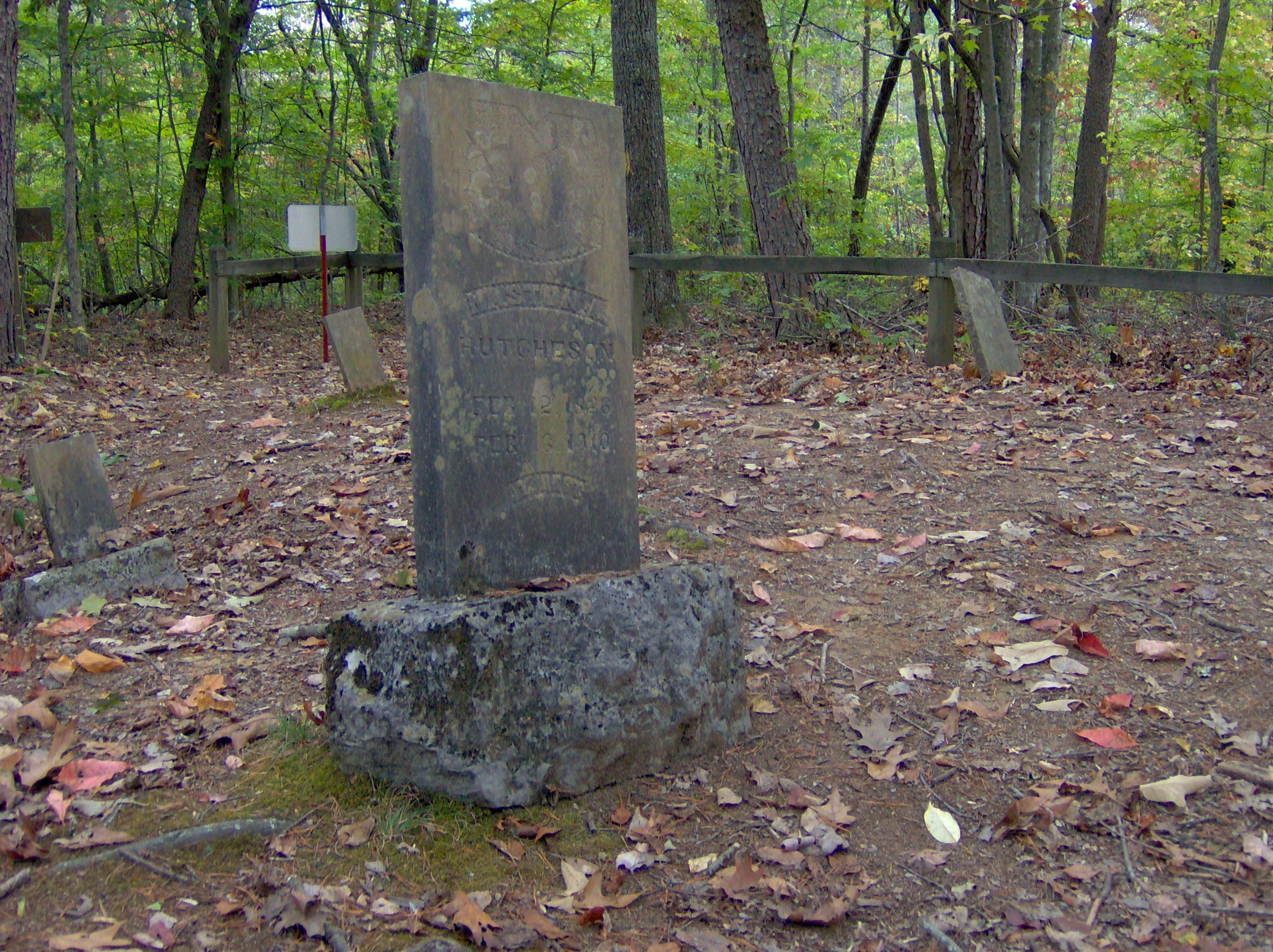
The grave of Maston Hutcheson at Norton Cemetery

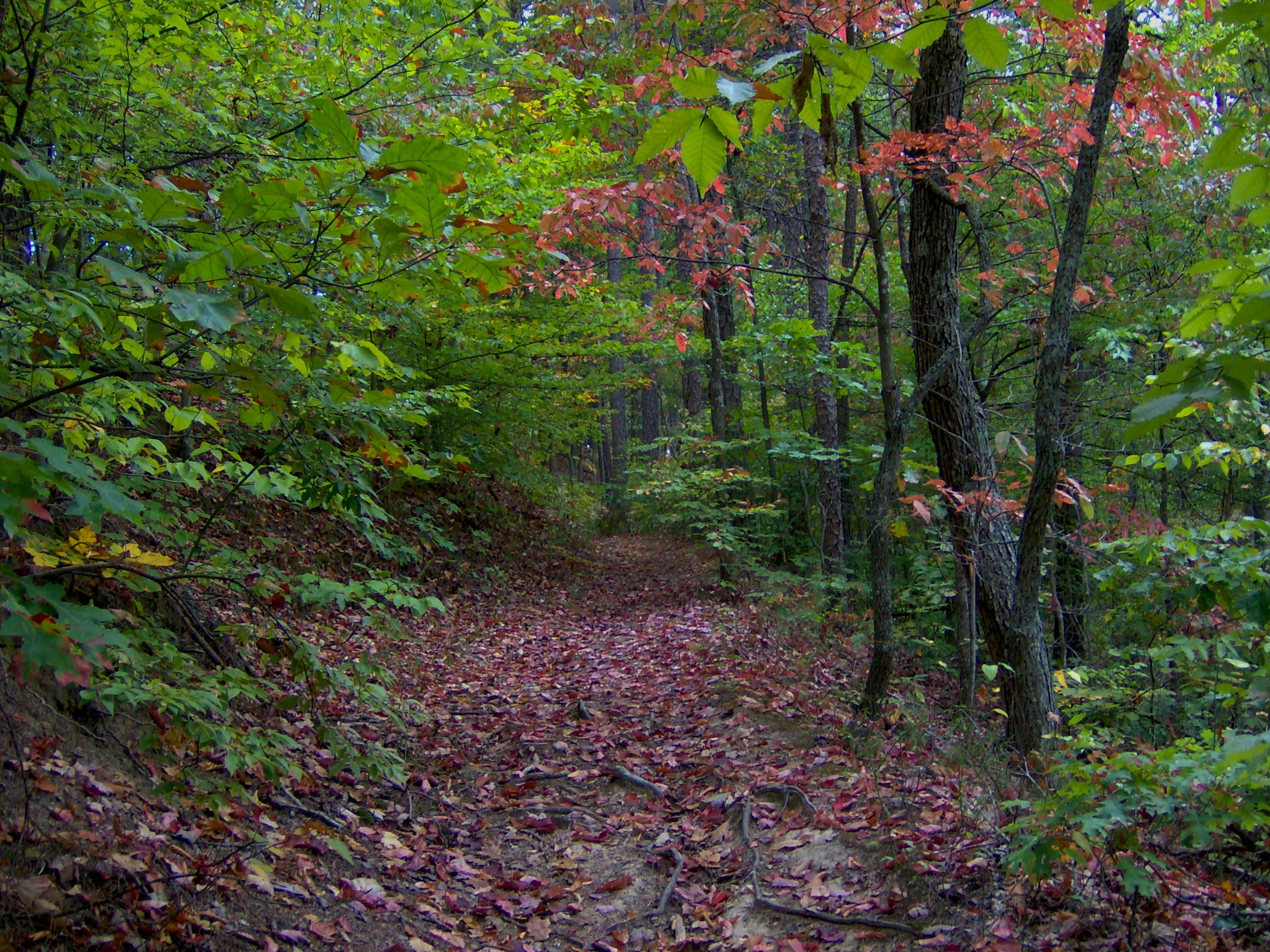
Big Valley Trail on the slopes of Pinnacle Ridge

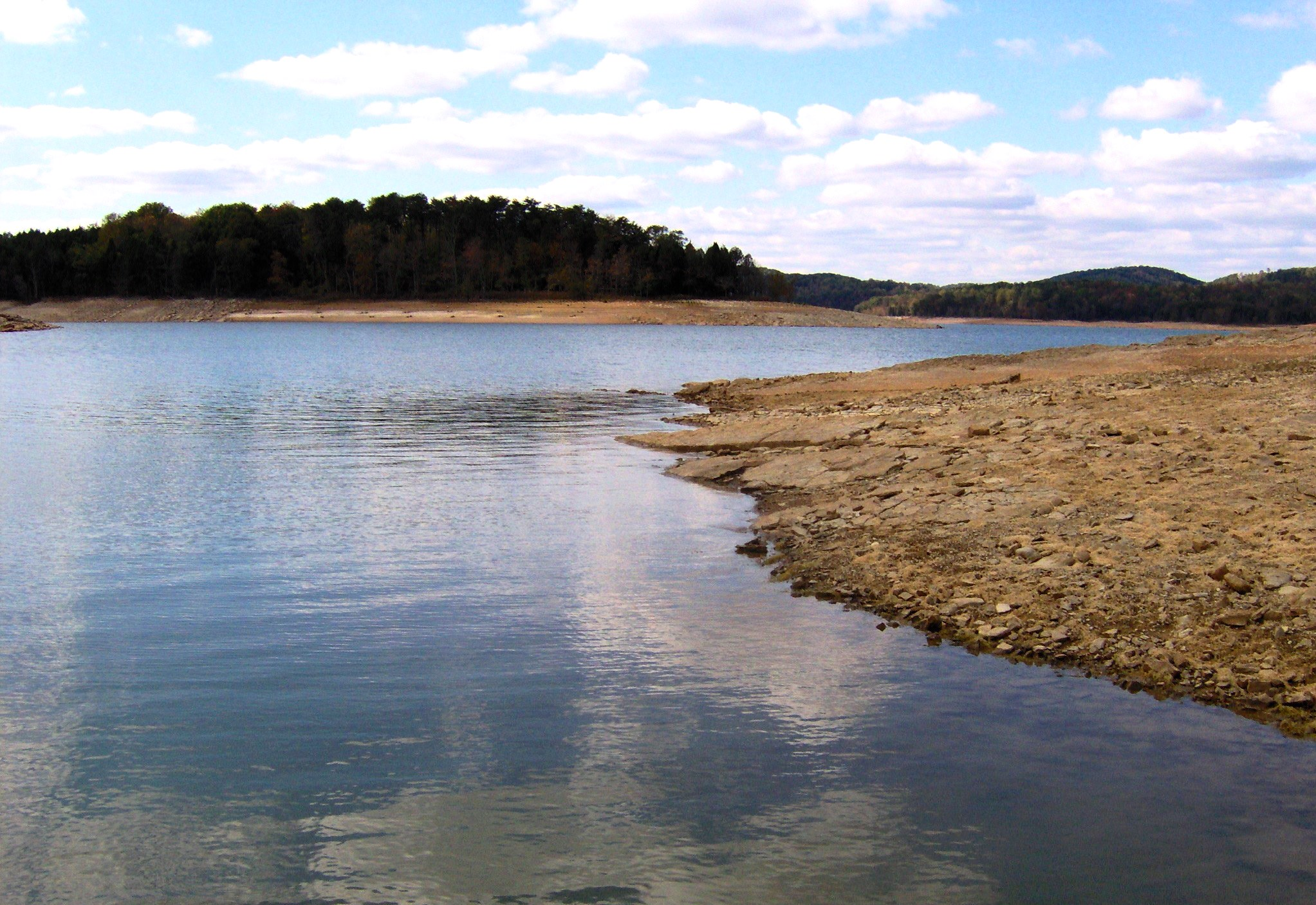
Norris Lake near the Sharp's Station site

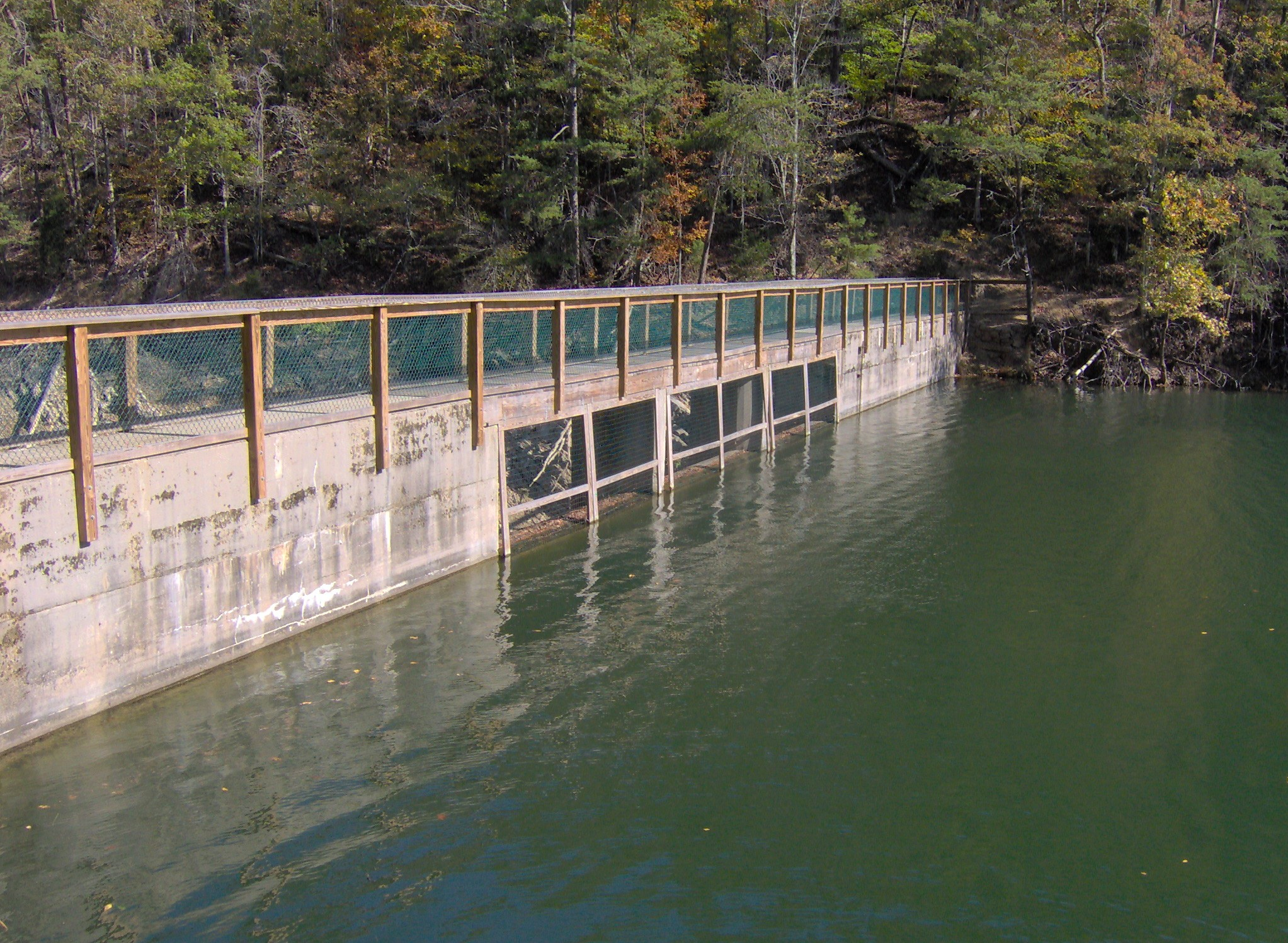
Big Ridge Dam, viewed from the Lake Trail

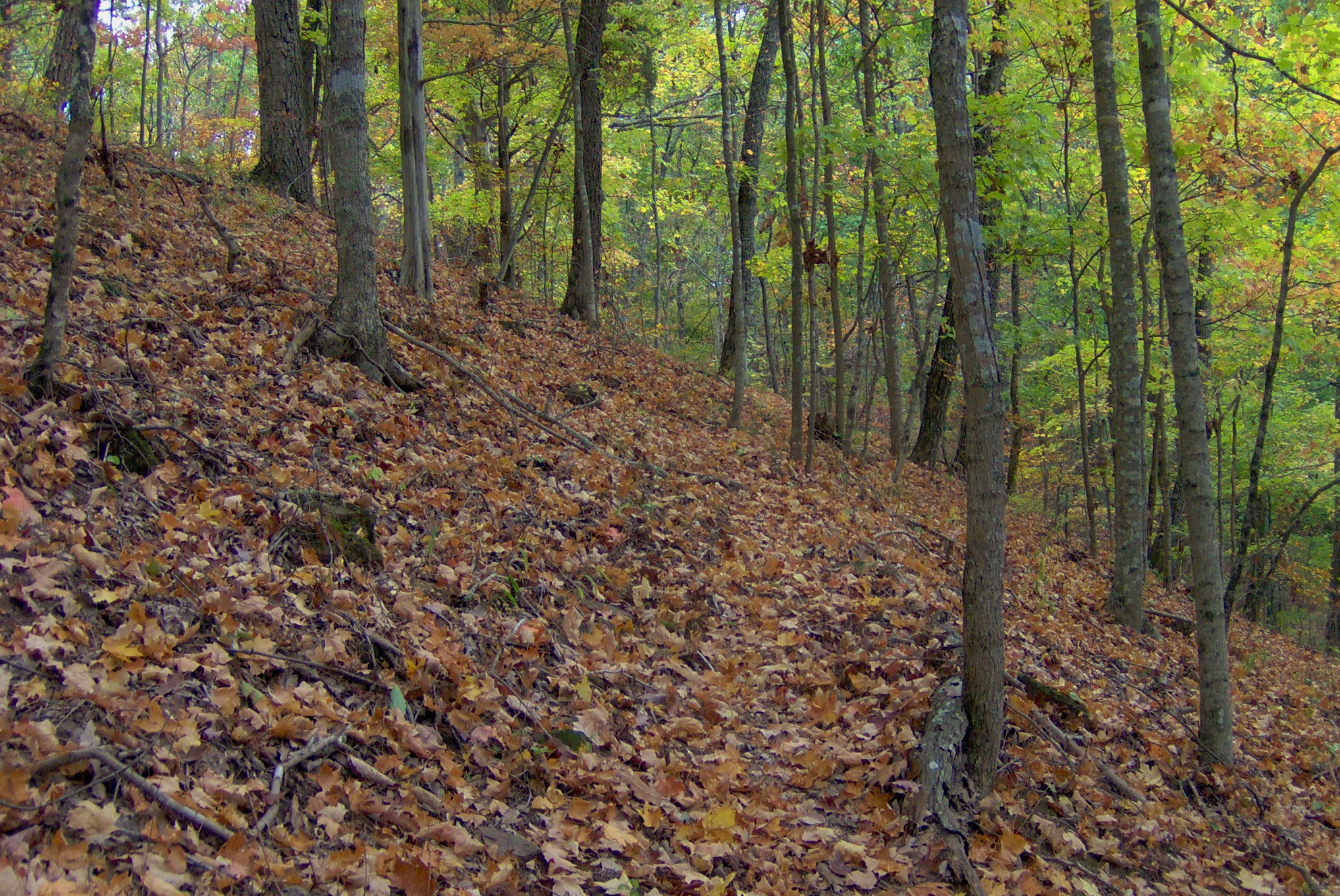
Indian Rock Trail on the slopes of Big Ridge
