= Luttrell, Tennessee =

- City
- City of Luttrell
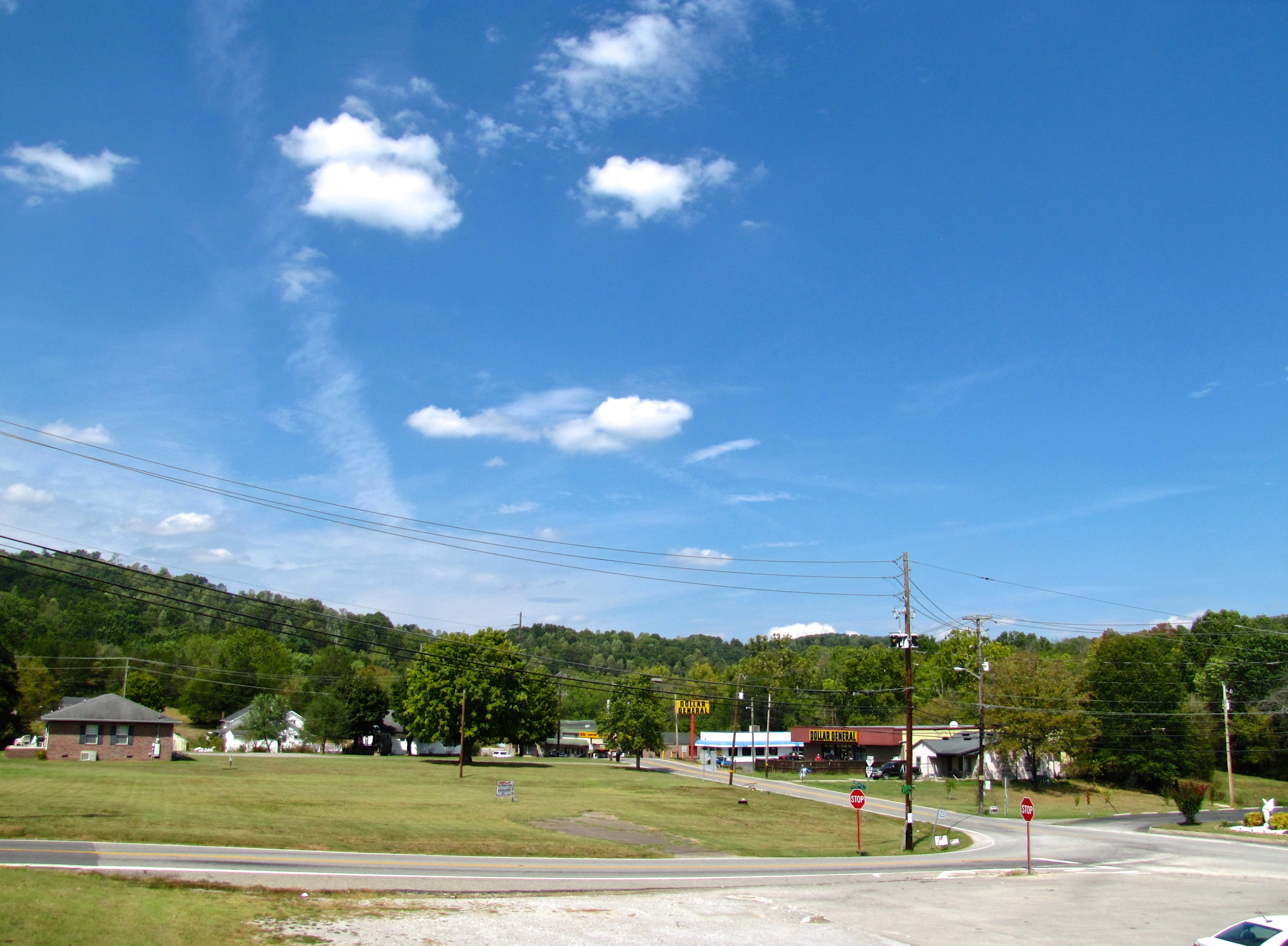
- Intersection of SR 131 and SR 61 in Luttrell

- Location of Luttrell in Union County, Tennessee.
- Coordinates: 36°12′11″N 83°44′45″W
- Country: United States
- State: Tennessee
- County: Union
- Incorporated: 1925

Government
  - Type: Mayor-council
  - Mayor: Jerry Lawson
  - Vice Mayor: Jody Smith

Area
  - Total: 3.93 sq mi (10.18 km^{2})
  - Land: 3.93 sq mi (10.18 km^{2})
  - Water: 0 sq mi (0.00 km^{2})
- Elevation: 1,076 ft (328 m)

Population (2020)
  - Total: 1,017
  - Density: 258.7/sq mi (99.89/km^{2})
- Time zone: UTC-5 (Eastern (EST))
  - Summer (DST): UTC-4 (EDT)
- ZIP code: 37779
- Area code: 865
- FIPS code: 47-44300
- GNIS feature ID: 1303493

Luttrell is a city in Union County, Tennessee, United States. The population was 1,074 at the 2010 census, up from 915 at the 2000 census. It is included in the Knoxville, Tennessee Metropolitan Statistical Area.

== History ==
Originally known as Cedar Ford, Luttrell was renamed to its current name in 1890. In the 19th century, Cedar Ford was the site of a lime kiln and a marble quarry, supporting a population of 808 as of the 1870 Census. In 1887, the Powell Valley Railroad (now part of the Norfolk Southern Railway) was built through the community, making it a shipping center for the surrounding area. Luttrell became an incorporated municipality in 1925.

== Geography ==
According to the United States Census Bureau, the city has a total area of 3.9 square miles (10 km^{2}), consisting entirely of land. The city is situated in a valley between Copper ridge to the north and Clinch Mountain to the south. Both ridges are characteristic of the Appalachian Ridge-and-Valley range. Luttrell is drained by Flat Creek, a tributary of the Holston River. Plainview borders Luttrell to the southwest.

Tennessee State Route 131 and Tennessee State Route 61 intersect in Luttrell. SR 131 connects the city with Plainview to the southwest, and SR 61 connects the city with Maynardville to the north and Blaine to the south.

== Demographics ==
Historical population
Census	Pop.	Note	%±
1970	819		—
1980	962		17.5%
1990	812		−15.6%
2000	915		12.7%
2010	1,074		17.4%
2020	1,017		−5.3%

=== 2020 census ===
Luttrell racial composition
Race	Number	Percentage
White (non-Hispanic)	918	90.27%
Black or African American (non-Hispanic)	9	0.88%
Native American	1	0.1%
Asian	2	0.2%
Other/Mixed	48	4.72%
Hispanic or Latino	39	3.83%

As of the 2020 United States census, there were 1,017 people, 366 households, and 231 families residing in the town.

=== 2000 census ===
As of the census of 2000, there were 915 people, 352 households, and 273 families residing in Luttrell. The population density was 232.7 inhabitants per square mile (89.8/km^{2}). There were 382 housing units at an average density of 97.1 per square mile (37.5/km^{2}). The racial makeup of the town was 98.80% White, 0.33% African American, 0.44% Native American, and 0.44% from two or more races. Hispanic or Latino of any race were 0.77% of the population.

There were 352 households, out of which 34.1% had children under the age of 18 living with them, 61.9% were married couples living together, 11.6% had a female householder with no husband present, and 22.4% were non-families. 20.7% of all households were made up of individuals, and 9.7% had someone living alone who was 65 years of age or older. The average household size was 2.55 and the average family size was 2.93.

In the town the population was spread out, with 25.4% under the age of 18, 8.5% from 18 to 24, 29.3% from 25 to 44, 23.3% from 45 to 64, and 13.6% who were 65 years of age or older. The median age was 37 years. For every 100 females, there were 94.7 males. For every 100 females age 18 and over, there were 90.3 males.

The median income for a household in the town was $20,766, and the median income for a family was $22,875. Males had a median income of $23,269 versus $17,438 for females. The per capita income for the town was $10,203. About 22.3% of families and 26.3% of the population were below the poverty line, including 35.0% of those under age 18 and 37.6% of those age 65 or over.

== Notable people ==
- Chet Atkins, country music artist and Grand Ole Opry member
- Kenny Chesney, country music artist
