= Maynardville, Tennessee =

City and county seat of Union County, Tennessee, United States

Maynardville, Tennessee Liberty
- City
- City of Maynardville
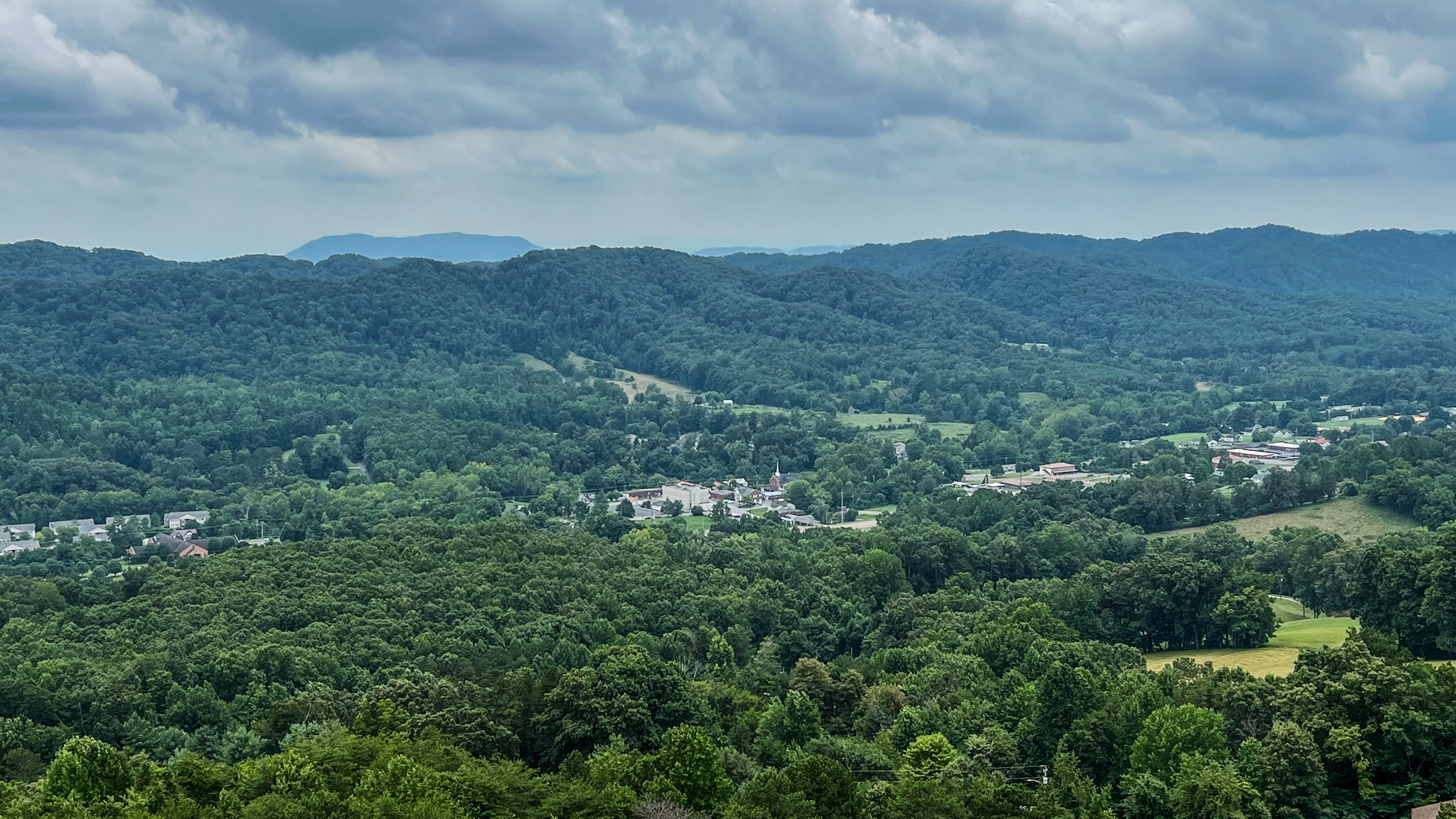
- Maynardville as seen from Hinds Ridge

- Logo
- Nickname: The Cradle of Country Music
- Motto(s): "A Friendly Town with an Eye on the Future.", "My Maynardville, My Home."
- Location of Maynardville in Union County, Tennessee.
- Coordinates: 36°14′45″N 83°48′26″W
- Country: United States
- State: Tennessee
- County: Union
- Settled: 1850
- Incorporated: 1870
- Named after: Horace Maynard

Government
  - Type: Commission-Manager
  - Mayor: Ty Blakely
  - City Manager: Thomas McCormick

Area
  - Total: 5.39 sq mi (13.97 km^{2})
  - Land: 5.39 sq mi (13.97 km^{2})
  - Water: 0 sq mi (0.00 km^{2})
- Elevation: 1,197 ft (365 m)

Population (2020)
  - Total: 2,456
  - Density: 455/sq mi (175.8/km^{2})
- Time zone: UTC-5 (Eastern (EST))
  - Summer (DST): UTC-4 (EDT)
- ZIP code: 37807
- Area code: 865
- FIPS code: 47-46700
- GNIS feature ID: 2405042
- Website: www.maynardvilletn.com

Maynardville (originally named Liberty) is a city in and the county seat of Union County, Tennessee, United States. The city was named to honor Horace Maynard, who successfully defended the creation of Union County from a challenge from Knox County. As of the 2020 census, Maynardville had a population of 2,456. It is included in the Knoxville metropolitan area.

== History ==
Maynardville began in the early 19th century as a small community known as Liberty. When Union County was created in the 1850s, Liberty, being nearest the center of the county, was chosen as the county seat. The land for the courthouse square was donated by Marcus Monroe, a local minister.

Shortly after the Tennessee General Assembly passed legislation authorizing the creation of Union County, Knox County secured an injunction blocking the creation of the new county, which would take some of its area from Knox County. To defend the new county, its supporters retained the services of Horace Maynard, a Knoxville-area attorney and later U.S. Postmaster General. After Maynard successfully defended the new county in litigation proceedings, Liberty was renamed "Maynardville" in his honor. Union County was formally recognized in 1856.

Country music singer Roy Acuff was born in Maynardville in 1903. The Acuff family had been well-established in Union County since the mid-19th century. When Goodspeed published its History of Tennessee in 1887, the Union County section included a brief biography of Roy's grandfather, Coram Acuff (1846–1931), who represented Union County in the state legislature.

Throughout the early to mid-20th century, State Route 33 through Maynardville was part of the infamous Thunder Road, which was used by bootleggers to illegally transport and trade moonshine. This story was later fictionally adapted into a 1958 crime-drama film and song of the same name.

Since the dawn of the 21st century, Maynardville has become increasingly suburban with the widening projects of SR 33 (Maynardville Highway) providing quicker access to Knoxville. Plans to redevelop and revitalize Maynardville have been proposed since the 2010s.

== Geography ==
Maynardville is situated near the center of Raccoon Valley, a narrow valley stretching for roughly 15 miles (24 km) between Copper Ridge on the south and Hinds Ridge on the north. Like most mountains in the Ridge-and-Valley Appalachians, these two ridges are long and narrow, and often fractured into smaller hills and knobs. The Norris Lake impoundment of the Clinch River is located about 5 miles (8.0 km) north of Maynardville.

Maynardville is concentrated around a stretch of State Route 33, which connects the city to Knoxville 15 miles (24 km) to the southwest and Tazewell 22 miles (35 km) to the northeast. State Route 61 connects Maynardville with Luttrell 8 miles (13 km) and Blaine 13 miles (21 km) to the south, and State Route 144 connects Maynardville with Plainview 8 miles (13 km) to the southwest.

According to the United States Census Bureau, the city has a total area of 5.4 square miles (14 km^{2}), all land.

== Demographics ==
Historical population
Census	Pop.	Note	%±
1860	188		—
1870	155		−17.6%
1880	178		14.8%
1890	144		−19.1%
1960	620		—
1970	702		13.2%
1980	924		31.6%
1990	1,298		40.5%
2000	1,782		37.3%
2010	2,413		35.4%
2020	2,456		1.8%

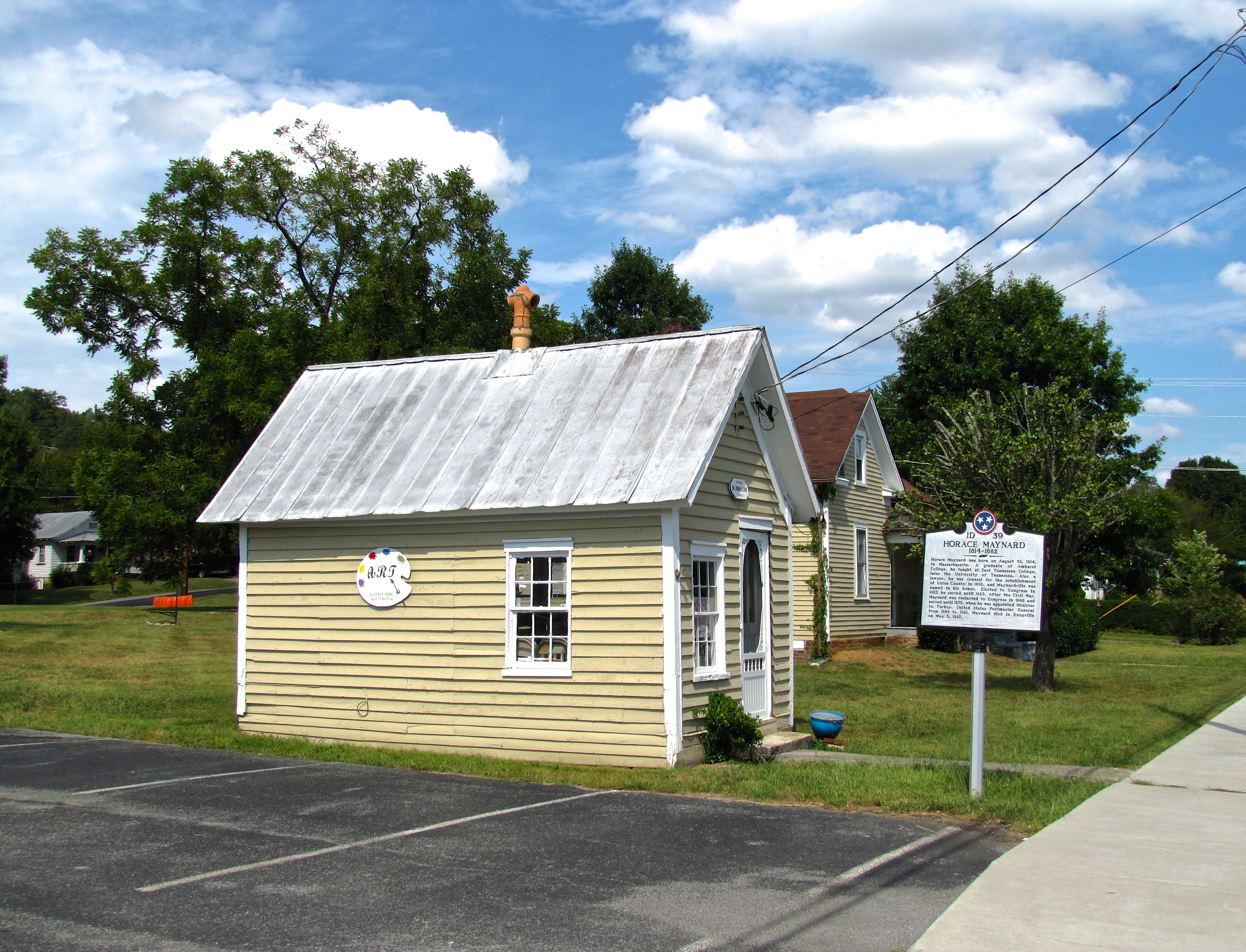
The old Dr. Carr office building, now an art gallery, in Maynardville

=== 2020 census ===
As of the 2020 census, there was a population of 2,456, with 925 households and 528 families residing in the city. The median age was 35.4 years. 25.9% of residents were under the age of 18 and 14.3% of residents were 65 years of age or older. For every 100 females there were 92.5 males, and for every 100 females age 18 and over there were 90.5 males age 18 and over.

0.0% of residents lived in urban areas, while 100.0% lived in rural areas.

There were 925 households in Maynardville, including 528 families. Of those households, 34.8% had children under the age of 18 living in them. Of all households, 43.1% were married-couple households, 17.1% were households with a male householder and no spouse or partner present, and 32.3% were households with a female householder and no spouse or partner present. About 28.4% of all households were made up of individuals and 13.0% had someone living alone who was 65 years of age or older.

There were 1,035 housing units, of which 10.6% were vacant. The homeowner vacancy rate was 1.0% and the rental vacancy rate was 12.3%.

Racial composition as of the 2020 census
Race	Number	Percent
White	2,276	92.7%
Black or African American	5	0.2%
American Indian and Alaska Native	3	0.1%
Asian	8	0.3%
Native Hawaiian and Other Pacific Islander	0	0.0%
Some other race	38	1.5%
Two or more races	126	5.1%
Hispanic or Latino (of any race)	79	3.2%

=== 2000 census ===
As of the census of 2000, 1,782 people, 683 households, and 463 families were residing in the city. The population density was 330.1 inhabitants per square mile (127.5/km^{2}). The 769 housing units averaged 142.4 units per square mile (55.0 units/km^{2}). The racial makeup of the city was 98.37% White, 0.17% African American, 0.06% Native American, 0.11% Asian, and 1.29% from two or more races. Hispanics or Latinos of any race were 0.34% of the population.

Of the 683 households, 37.0% had children under the age of 18 living with them, 49.9% were married couples living together, 14.9% had a female householder with no husband present, and 32.1% were not families. About 28.8% of all households were made up of individuals, and 10.8% had someone living alone who was 65 years of age or older. The average household size was 2.46, and the average family size was 3.03.

In the city, the age distribution was 26.9% under 18, 8.0% from 18 to 24, 32.7% from 25 to 44, 18.6% from 45 to 64, and 13.9% who were 65 or older. The median age was 34 years. For every 100 females, there were 93.1 males. For every 100 females age 18 and over, there were 90.1 males.

The median income for a household in the city was $23,077, and for a family was $30,398. Males had a median income of $25,278 versus $18,603 for females. The per capita income for the city was $12,168. About 20.2% of families and 26.4% of the population were below the poverty line, including 34.8% of those under age 18 and 32.9% of those age 65 or over.

== Economy ==
According to 2010 Census report published by the East Tennessee Development District in 2012, the top three industries employing residents of Maynardville were professional services, trade, and manufacturing.

Nearly 62% of the city's population was reported to commute outside of Union County for employment in 2010.

== Government ==
=== Municipal ===
Maynardville uses the Council-manager government system, which was established in 1870 when the city was incorporated. It is governed locally by a five-member board. The citizens elect the board to four-year terms. The board elects a mayor and a vice mayor from among the seated board members.

=== State ===
Maynardville is represented in the 36th District of the Tennessee House of Representatives by Dennis Powers, a Republican.

It is represented in the 8th District of the Tennessee Senate by Frank Niceley, also a Republican.

=== Federal ===
Maynardville is represented in the United States House of Representatives by Republican Chuck Fleischmann of the 3rd congressional district.

== Notable people ==
- Roy Acuff (1903–1992), country music singer-songwriter, Grand Ole Opry regular, Governor of Tennessee candidate, and musician
- Kenny Chesney
- Carl Smith (1927–2010), country music, countrypolitan, and rockabilly singer-songwriter, musician

== In popular culture ==
In the 2009 film Inglourious Basterds, the character of 1 SSF First Lieutenant Aldo Raine, portrayed by Brad Pitt, is said to be a moonshiner from Maynardville.

The song "The Ballad of Thunder Road", references Maynardville.
