= Corryton, Tennessee =

- Unincorporated community
- Corryton Village
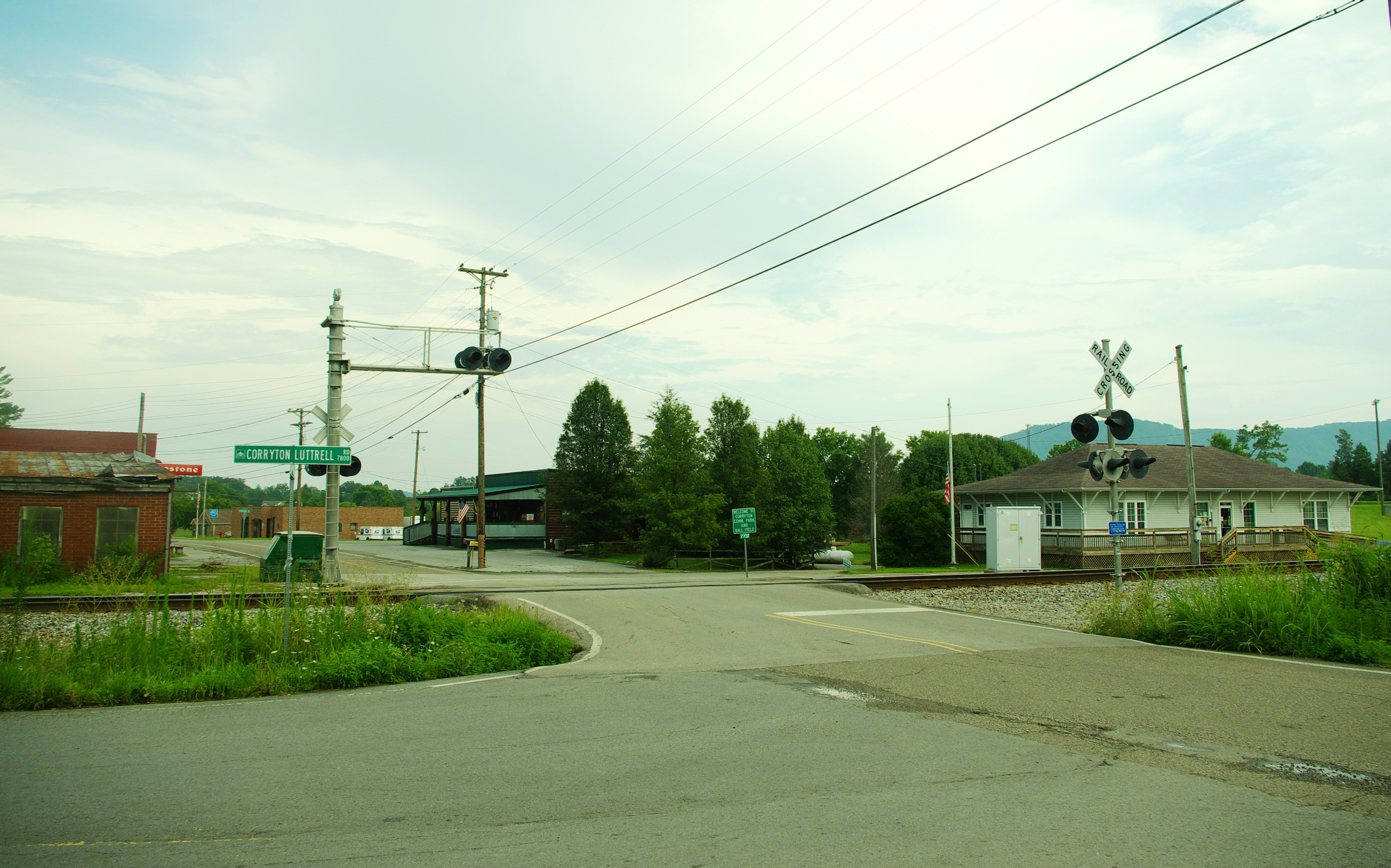
- Corryton Depot near the intersection of Corryton Road and Corryton Luttrell Road

- Location in Tennessee and the United States Corryton (the United States)
- Coordinates: 36°09′13″N 83°46′57″W
- Country: United States
- State: Tennessee
- County: Knox
- Settled: 1785
- Founded by: John Sawyers
- Named after: Corryton Woodbury

Government
  - Type: County commission
  - Mayor: Glenn Jacobs (R)
  - Commissioners: Adam Thompson (R) (District 8); Kim Frazier (R) (At-Large); Larsen Jay (R) (At-Large)
- Elevation: 1,043 ft (318 m)
- Time zone: UTC-5 (Eastern (EST))
  - Summer (DST): UTC-4 (EDT)
- ZIP codes: 37721
- Area code: 865
- FIPS code: 47093
- GNIS feature ID: 1281332

Corryton, also known as Corryton Village, is an unincorporated bedroom community in northeastern Knox County, Tennessee, United States, about 15 miles northeast of Knoxville. The United States Geographic Names System classifies Corryton as a populated place. It is included in Knoxville Metropolitan Statistical Area.

== Geography ==
Corryton is situated near two mountains, House Mountain (the highest point in Knox County) and Clinch Mountain. It includes two elementary schools, a middle school, a high school, a public library, community center, and several churches including Little Flat Creek Baptist Church (founded in 1797, making it the first Baptist church organized in Knox County), Corryton Church (formerly Corryton Baptist) and Rutherford Memorial United Methodist.

== History ==
John Sawyers, a Revolutionary War veteran, settled in the vicinity of what is now Corryton in 1785. He subsequently built a small fort along the Emory Road. The community remained primarily agricultural until the construction of the Knoxville, Cumberland Gap and Louisville Railroad through the area in the late 1880s. The rail station that served the community was initially known as "Floyd."

In 1887, a developer named Corryton Woodbury purchased property surrounding the rail depot to grow the community into a suburban town. The lots failed to sell, and the venture was unsuccessful, with the community remaining a predominantly rural hamlet.

On April 25, 1983, Thomas Knauff set an FAI world record flying a glider on an out-and-return course of 1,646.68 km (1,023.20 mi), releasing from tow over Williamsport Regional Airport in Pennsylvania, flying south along the Ridge-and-valley Appalachians to take a turn-point photograph of the Little Flat Creek Church in Corryton, then returning for a landing after a 10-hour flight. The photographs were published in National Geographic magazine. This world record stood until 2003 when it was broken in Argentina, but still stands as a U.S. national record.

== Notable people ==
- Kenny Chesney – country music singer-songwriter, Gibbs High School alumni
- Phil Leadbetter – bluegrass musician, Gibbs High School alumni
- Ashley Monroe – singer-songwriter, Gibbs High School alumni
- Morgan Wallen – country pop singer-songwriter, Gibbs High School alumni
