= Tennessee State Route 71 =

State highway in Tennessee, United States

State Route 71

Route information
- Maintained by TDOT and NPS
- Length: 85.8 mi (138.1 km)
- Existed: October 1, 1923–present

Major junctions
- South end: US 441 at the North Carolina state line within the Great Smoky Mountains National Park
- US 321 in Gatlinburg; SR 449 in Pigeon Forge; US 411 / SR 66 in Sevierville; SR 158 in Knoxville; I-40 in Knoxville; US 11 / US 70 in Knoxville; US 441 / SR 33 in Knoxville; I-640 / US 25W in Knoxville; I-75 in Rocky Top
- North end: US 25W / SR 116 in Rocky Top

Location
- Country: United States
- State: Tennessee
- Counties: Sevier, Blount, Knox, Anderson, Campbell

Highway system
- Tennessee State Routes; Interstate; US; State
← SR 70	→ US 72

State Route 71 (SR 71) is a north–south state highway in Tennessee. For most of the length it is a "hidden" route, as it coincides with US 441 in all but a short section in Knoxville. The road begins at the North Carolina state line in Sevier County within the Great Smoky Mountains National Park at Newfound Gap and ends at an intersection with US 25W, SR 116, and SR 9 (hidden) in Rocky Top. Along its length SR 71 passes through Sevier County, a small portion of Blount County, Knox County, Anderson County, and in and out of Campbell County. Despite being signed on Hall of Fame Parkway in Knoxville, Tennessee, the Knox County TDOT map ignores SR 71 while SR 33 has a concurrency with US 441.

== Route description ==
=== Southern concurrent section ===
SR 71 begins concurrent with US 441 within the Great Smoky Mountains National Park at the North Carolina state line on Newfound Gap. SR 71 is known as Newfound Gap Road within the park, and follows along a valley carved by the West Prong of the Little Pigeon River as a narrow and curvy 2-Lane highway. Newfound Gap Road then becomes concurrent with SR 73 Scenic (Little River Road) before having an interchange with the Gatlinburg Bypass and entering the city of Gatlinburg, where US 441/SR 71/SR 73 Scenic leaves the park and becomes the Great Smoky Mountains Parkway (Parkway), a 4-lane undivided highway as it passes through the city. Parkway then has an intersection with US 321/SR 73 (East Parkway), where SR 73 Scenic ends and US 321/SR 73 joins Parkway. Parkway heads north to have another interchange with the Gatlinburg Bypass before leaving Gatlinburg and becoming a divided highway known as the Foothills Parkway Spur (more commonly known as The Spur). Parkway then enters the city of Pigeon Forge and widens to a 6-lane. It passes through the city and has an intersection with SR 449 (Dollywood Lane/Veterans Boulevard) before US 321/SR 73 head north along Wears Valley Road. US 441/SR 71 (Parkway) then crosses a bridge over the West Prong of the Little Pigeon River to enter Sevierville. They pass by several tourist attractions and a Tanger Outlets before again crossing the West Prong of the Little Pigeon River and turning of the Parkway and north onto Forks of the River Parkway at the southern edge of downtown. They bypass downtown on the west side as an undivided highway before coming to an intersection with SR 66 (Winfield Dunn Parkway) and US 411/SR 35 (W Main Street), where US 441/SR 71 turns left to become concurrent with US 411/SR 35 as a 4-lane undivided highway known as Chapman Highway, and the Great Smoky Mountains Parkway continues onto SR 66. Chapman Highway then crosses a bridge over West Prong of the Little Pigeon River and leaves Sevierville as a divided highway through rural areas. It then passes through some mountainous areas as an undivided highway before entering Seymour. Chapman Highway passes by several homes and businesses before coming to an intersection with SR 338 (Boyds Creek Highway), where US 411/SR 35 heads south along Maryville Highway. US 441/SR 71 (Chapman Highway) continues north to pass through a small portion of Blount County before leaving Seymour and crossing into Knox County.

US 441/SR 71 (Chapman Highway) passes through suburban areas as it enters South Knoxville. It has an interchange with SR 168 (Governor John Sevier Highway) before passing through a business district.

=== James White Parkway and Downtown Knoxville ===
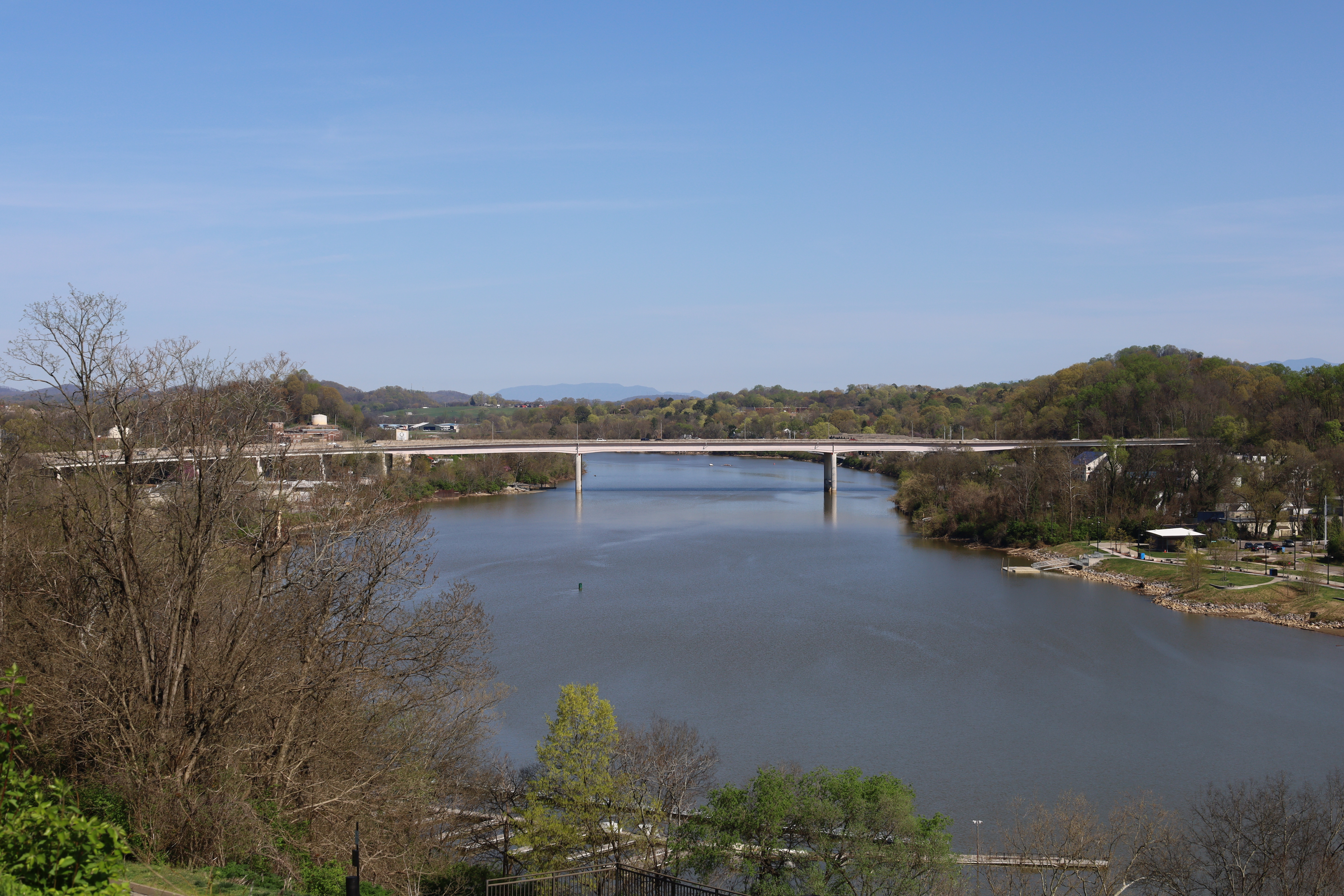
The James C. Ford Memorial Bridge over the Tennessee River in 2025

SR 71 then breaks off from US 441 and follows E Moody Avenue for a few blocks before joining South Knox Boulevard (signed as James White Parkway) at an interchange with its current southern end. SR 71 then heads north as a freeway and has interchanges with Cottrell Street, Sevier Avenue, and Hillwood Avenue before traversing the James C. Ford Memorial Bridge over the Tennessee River to enter downtown Knoxville.

SR 71 then turns west and leaves James White Parkway, which continues as SR 158, and follows an adjoining exit ramp which intersects with Riverside Drive and Hill Avenue before reaching Hall of Fame Drive; even through SR 71 is signed as a primary highway along SR 158. This the only section where SR 71 sign is posted. SR 71 then follows Hall of Fame Drive north through downtown, running parallel to SR 158 (James White Parkway), and has an intersection with US 11/US 70/SR 1 (E Fifth Avenue/Magnolia Avenue) before having an interchange with I-40 (Exit 389).

=== Northern concurrent section ===
It then becomes concurrent again with US 441/SR 33 (Broadway) at an interchange. Broadway continues north as a 4-lane undivided highway through neighborhoods and suburban areas before having an intersection with SR 331 (Old Broadway) and an interchange with I-640/US 25W/SR 9 (Exit 6) and entering Fountain City. Broadway has a partial interchange with SR 331 (Tazewell Pike) before it passes through a business district before passing through downtown. It then becomes a divided highway as it crosses a ridge, where it leaves Fountain City and Knoxville to enter Halls Crossroads. Broadway now becomes Maynardville Pike and passes through suburban areas and business districts before US 441/SR 71 splits off from SR 33 (Maynardville Pike) along Norris Freeway as a 4-lane undivided highway shortly before having an intersection with SR 131 (E Emory Road). The highway then narrows to 2-lanes and leaves Halls Crossroads to pass through rural areas. It then becomes concurrent with SR 170 (Old Raccoon Valley Road) before crossing into Anderson County.

SR 170 splits off from US 441/SR 71 (Norris Freeway) along Hickory Valley Road before US 441/SR 71 continues north through rural areas to enter the city of Norris, where they have a short concurrency with SR 61 (Andersonville Highway/Charles G. Seviers Boulevard) before passing through Norris Dam State Park and crossing the Clinch River on top of the Norris Dam. The highway turns east and becomes windy and curvy as its crosses into Campbell County twice for short distances before re entering Anderson County to enter Rocky Top. US 441/SR 71 then have an interchange with I-75 (Exit 128) and widen to an undivided 4-lane shortly before coming to an end at an intersection with US 25W/SR 9/SR 116 (N Main Street) just north of downtown.

== History ==
In 1964, the City of Knoxville released a transportation study suggesting the construction of a controlled-access highway connecting downtown Knoxville to South Knoxville and John Sevier Highway (SR 168). Originally known as the South Knoxville Boulevard, the freeway planned for a crossing of the Tennessee River and two design alternatives, with Alternative A starting further east and passing through the Sevierville Pike area, and Alternative B starting at the end of Neyland Drive through Colonial Village. Both alternatives were to end at SR 168 and serve as a bypass of Chapman Highway.

== Future ==
At this time, South Knox Boulevard (SR 71) ends at Sevierville Pike, although there are current plans to extend the road to meet US 441 (Chapman Highway) or SR 168 (Governor John Sevier Highway).

== Junction list ==
County	Location	mi	km	Destinations	Notes
Sevier	Great Smoky Mountains National Park	0.0	0.0	US 441 south (New Found Gap Road) – Cherokee	Southern terminus at North Carolina state line; southern end of US 441 concurrency
Sevier	Great Smoky Mountains National Park			SR 73 Scenic east (Little River Road) – Townsend, Elkmont, Cades Cove	Southern end of SR 73 Scenic concurrency
Sevier	Great Smoky Mountains National Park			Gatlinburg Bypass north – Pigeon Forge	Southern terminus of Gatlinburg Bypass
Sevier	Gatlinburg			US 321 north (East Parkway/SR 73 east) – Pittman Center, Cosby, Newport	Southern end of wrong-way concurrency with US 321/SR 73; End SR 73 Scenic concurrency; Eastern terminus of SR 73 Scenic
Sevier	Gatlinburg			Gatlinburg Bypass south – Cherokee	Interchange; No northbound access
Sevier	Pigeon Forge			SR 449 north (Dollywood Lane/Veterans Parkway) – Dollywood	Southern terminus of SR 449
Sevier	Pigeon Forge			US 321 south (Wears Valley Road/SR 73 west) – Wears Valley, Townsend	Northern end of Wrong-way concurrency with US 321/SR 73
Sevier	Sevierville			Parkway to SR 66 (Winfield Dunn Parkway) / SR 448 (North Parkway)	
Sevier	Sevierville			US 411 north (West Main Street/SR 35 north) / SR 66 / I-40 north (Winfield Dunn Parkway) – Newport, Kodak	Southern end of Wrong-way concurrency with US 411/SR 35; Southern terminus of SR 66
Sevier	Seymour			US 411 south (Maryville Highway/SR 35 south) – Maryville, Alcoa SR 338 north (Boyds Creek Highway) – Boyds Creek	Northern end of wrong-way concurrency with US 411/SR 35; Southern terminus of SR 338
Knox	South Knoxville			SR 168 (Governor John Sevier Highway) – Johnson University, Strawberry Plains	Interchange
Knox	South Knoxville			US 441 north (Chapman Highway) to SR 33	Northern end of US 441 concurrency
Knox	South Knoxville			Sevierville Pike – Seymour	
Knox	South Knoxville			Cottrell Street	Interchange
Knox	South Knoxville			Sevier Avenue / Hillwood Avenue	Interchange
Knox	Knoxville			Riverside Drive, Hill Avenue, Hall of Fame Drive, SR 158 (Neyland Drive, James White Parkway)	Interchange; SR 71 north follows ramp unsigned
Knox	Knoxville			SR 158 (Neyland Drive, James White Parkway) to I-40	Ramp to SR 158
Knox	Knoxville			West Magnolia Avenue To US 441 / SR 33	
Knox	Knoxville			US 11 / US 70 (East Magnolia Avenue/East Fifth Street/SR 1) – Farragut, Strawberry Plains	
Knox	Knoxville			I-40 – Nashville, Asheville	I-40 exit 389
Knox	Knoxville			US 441 south / SR 33 south (North Broadway)	southbound exit and northbound entrance; Southern end of US 441/SR 33 concurrency
Knox	Knoxville			SR 331 north (Old Broadway)	Southern terminus of SR 331
Knox	Knoxville			I-640 / US 25W (SR 9) – Nashville, Asheville	I-640 exit 6
Knox	Knoxville			SR 331 (Tazewell Pike) – Corryton, Plainview	Interchange; northbound exit and southbound entrance
Knox	Halls Crossroads			SR 33 north (Maynardville Highway) – Maynardville, New Tazewell	Northern end of SR 33 concurrency
Knox	Halls Crossroads			SR 131 (East Emory Road) – Powell, Corryton	
Knox				SR 170 west (Old Raccoon Valley Road) – Heiskell, Claxton	Southern end of SR 170 concurrency
Anderson				SR 170 east (Hickory Valley Road) – New Tazewell	Northern end of SR 170 concurrency
Anderson	Norris			SR 61 (Andersonville Highway) – Andersonville, Big Ridge State Park	Southern end of SR 61 concurrency
Anderson	Norris			SR 61 west (North Charles G. Seivers Boulevard) – Clinton	Northern end of SR 61 concurrency
Campbell	No major junctions				
Anderson	No major junctions				
Campbell	No major junctions				
Anderson	Rocky Top			I-75 – Knoxville, Lexington	I-75 exit 128
Anderson	Rocky Top	85.8	138.1	US 25W / SR 116 (North Main Street/SR 9) – Caryville, downtown Rocky Top	Northern terminus of US 441 and SR 71
1.000 mi = 1.609 km; 1.000 km = 0.621 mi: Concurrency terminus

== See also ==
- List of Tennessee state highways
