= Tennessee State Route 449 =

State highway in Tennessee, United States

State Route 449
- Veterans Boulevard; Dollywood Lane
- SR 449 highlighted in red

Route information
- Maintained by TDOT
- Length: 6.2 mi (10.0 km)

Major junctions
- South end: US 321 / US 441 in Pigeon Forge
- North end: US 411 in Sevierville

Location
- Country: United States
- State: Tennessee
- Counties: Sevier

Highway system
- Tennessee State Routes; Interstate; US; State
← SR 448	→ SR 450

State Route 449 (SR 449) is a north–south state highway in Sevier County in the eastern part of the U.S. state of Tennessee. It travels 6.2 miles (10.0 km) from US 411 (Dolly Parton Parkway) overlaying Veterans Boulevard and some of Middle Creek Road in Sevierville south to US 441/US 321 (Great Smoky Mountains Parkway) in Pigeon Forge. It serves as a bypass around the busy and congested tourist areas along the Great Smoky Mountains Parkway in Sevierville and Pigeon Forge. It is also a more direct route to Dollywood and Dollywood's Splash Country when traveling from the north. SR 449 opened to traffic in 2006, and an extension of the highway is planned.

== Route description ==
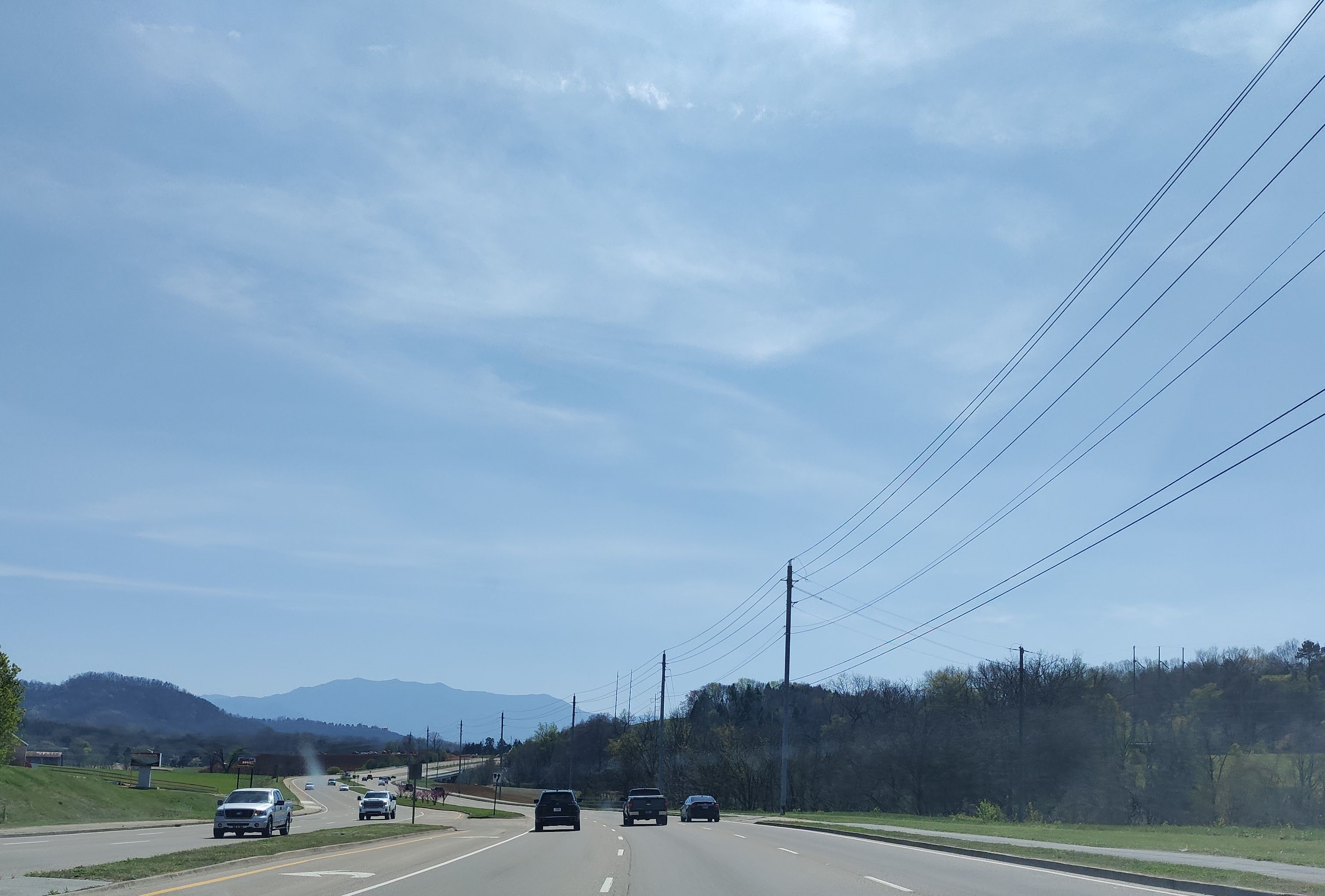
SR 449 (Veterans Boulevard) southbound, with Mount Le Conte visible in the background

SR 449 is classified as a primary highway by the Tennessee Department of Transportation (TDOT), which maintains the road. In 2024, the highest annual average daily traffic (AADT) volume was measured to be 25,491 vehicles per day north of the intersection with Dollywood Lane. The lowest measured volume was 23,901 vehicles per day north of the intersection with Jayell Road. The road is paralleled by a multi-use greenway.

SR 449 begins as Dollywood Lane at an intersection with US 321/US 441 (Great Smoky Mountains Parkway; signed as "Parkway") in Pigeon Forge. It travels to the northeast as a four-lane undivided highway, crossing over the West Prong of the Little Pigeon River, before making a wide curve to the northwest. Here, Dollywood Lane splits off and the road becomes Veterans Boulevard. The road then curves slightly to the north to have an intersection with Teaster Lane before turning northeast, meandering through several hills, and crossing Middle Creek to reach an intersection with McCarter Hollow Road. This road provides access to Dollywood and Dollywood's Splash Country. The highway then widens to a six-lane divided highway and begins passing through semi-rural areas, crossing Middle Creek again and intersecting Jake Thomas Road. The road then enters the Sevierville city limits and continues north through more semi-undeveloped areas, crossing Middle Creek again, and having an intersection with Collier Drive. SR 449 crosses Middle Creek two more times before reaching its northern terminus at an intersection with US 411 (Dolly Parton Parkway) just east of downtown Sevierville near the Gatlinburg-Pigeon Forge Airport.

== History ==
What is now the Dollywood Lane portion of SR 449 was originally a series of locally-maintained roads. In 1961, a theme park called Rebel Railroad opened. The park was later renamed Goldrush Junction, Goldrush, and Silver Dollar City. By 1985, the park was attracting approximately 750,000 visitors annually. In 1983, country singer and Sevier County native Dolly Parton announced plans to construct a theme park called Dollywood. In July 1985, Parton began negotiating with the owners of Silver Dollar City to expand the park into her proposed theme park. On July 22, 1985, Parton presented her plans for the park to the Pigeon Forge City Council and requested the city commit to infrastructure improvements in the area, including widening access roads. On September 23, 1985, the Pigeon Forge City Council approved a resolution committing to assist in the development of Dollywood, including improving Dollywood Lane, which was called Silver Dollar City Road at the time. The council renamed the road Dollywood Lane on October 28, 1985. The road was expanded to four lanes from the Great Smoky Mountains Parkway to north of the Pigeon River in the spring of 1986 before the May 3 opening of Dollywood. As part of this work, the intersection with US 441 was also upgraded.

As tourism increased to the Great Smoky Mountains National Park and new attractions opened in Pigeon Forge and Sevierville, traffic congestion on the Great Smoky Mountains Parkway became a serious issue. The problem was particularly exacerbated by a tourism boom that began after the 1982 World's Fair and the opening of Dollywood. While improvements were made to the parkway during this time, the need for a bypass around the central part of Pigeon Forge and a more direct access to Dollywood became apparent, and local leaders began advocating for this. Plans for the present day SR 449 were included in a Sevier County long-range transportation plan developed in 1996 in collaboration with TDOT. The following year, this plan was expected to cost $70 million (equivalent to $130 million in 2025) and take ten years. The proposal also examined options for extending the road north to I-40 and a connector from this extension to the SR 66 portion of the parkway near Catlettsburg north of Sevierville. This eventually evolved into a northern extension of SR 449 that will bypass Sevierville and tie into SR 66.

The road was chosen to roughly follow the alignment of Middle Creek Road, reusing portions of this road, and was commonly referred to as New Middle Creek Road during the planning and construction phases. The section between Teaster Lane north of US 441 and Center View Road was let in March 2001, which included upgrading and improving part of Dollywood Lane. The section extending to US 411 was let in December 2001. Construction was initially scheduled for completion in late 2004 or early 2005, but experienced multiple delays. On December 21, 2005, SR 449 partially opened to traffic between Dollywood Lane and Centerview Road, and with two lanes between this road and East Ridge Road. On June 30, 2006, an extension of Collier Drive between the Parkway and SR 449 opened to traffic. SR 449 was scheduled for full completion in December 2006, although final work was not finished until late June 2007. As part of the construction, the state assumed control of the Dollywood Lane portion of the route between the Parkway and the Dollywood Lane intersection. When SR 449 was initially built, it was only signed as Veterans Boulevard with the hidden designation of SR 449. It was also listed as a secondary highway in official TDOT documents. Signage for SR 449 was posted in 2013, with the designation being changed to a primary highway. The road continues to be signed as secondary in official state maps, however. Jake Thomas Road, another connector between the Parkway in Pigeon Forge and SR 449, opened on March 28, 2024.

The extension of SR 449 to SR 66 was included in Sevierville's Central Business Improvement District project, which was approved by the state in early 2004. In 2007, Sevierville officials initiated the design process for the extension. Around this time, the project was tentatively slated for completion in 2009 or 2010, but was placed on hold in 2009 due to the lack of a funding source. The project resurfaced in 2019 as part of a partnership between Sevierville, Sevier County, and TDOT officials. Sevierville and Sevier County officials approved the design phase for the extension in 2023, and on December 18 of that year, TDOT released a ten-year project plan that includes the construction of the extension in two phases. The new roadway will be a divided four-lane highway that is paralleled by a greenway. It is also planned to improve access to a proposed new interchange on I-40. The first phase, with construction expected to begin in early 2026, extends the road 1/2 mile (0.80 km) north to Robert Henderson Road, including a bridge over the Little Pigeon River and improvements to US 411 in the vicinity of the intersection. The second phase, which is tentatively planned to start in 2027, will extend the route 4.5 miles (7.2 km) to SR 66.

== Major intersections ==
The entire route is in Sevier County.

Location	mi	km	Destinations	Notes
Pigeon Forge	0.0	0.0	US 321 / US 441 (Parkway/SR 71/SR 73) – Townsend, Sevierville, Gatlinburg	Southern terminus
Pigeon Forge	2.1	3.4	McCarter Hollow Road - Dollywood, Dollywood's Splash Country	
Pigeon Forge	2.4	3.9	Jake Thomas Road to US 441 (Great Smoky Mountains Parkway)	
Sevierville	4.3	6.9	Collier Drive to US 441 (Great Smoky Mountains Parkway)	
Sevierville	6.2	10.0	US 411 (Dolly Parton Parkway/SR 35) – Seymour, Maryville, Newport	Northern terminus
1.000 mi = 1.609 km; 1.000 km = 0.621 mi
