= Tennessee State Route 73 =

Highway in Tennessee, United States

State Route 73
- SR 73; Secondary in red, scenic route in blue, unsigned in green

Route information
- Maintained by TDOT
- Length: 101.76 mi (163.77 km)
- Existed: October 1, 1923–present

Major junctions
- West end: I-40 / US 321 / SR 95 in Lenoir City
- I-75 in Lenoir City; US 129 in Maryville; Foothills Parkway in Walland; US 441 in Pigeon Forge; Gatlinburg Bypass in Gatlinburg; US 441 in Gatlinburg; Foothills Parkway in Cosby; US 321 near Cosby; I-40 near Cosby
- North end: US 25 / US 70 in Newport

Location
- Country: United States
- State: Tennessee
- Counties: Loudon, Blount, Sevier, Cocke

Highway system
- Tennessee State Routes; Interstate; US; State
← SR 72	SR 73	→ US 74
← SR 336	SR 337	→ SR 338

State Route 73 (SR 73) is west-north state highway in East Tennessee. For most of its length, it is an unsigned companion route to U.S. Route 321 (US 321).

== Route description ==
SR 73 begins at an interchange with Interstate 40 (I-40) concurrent with U.S. Route 321 (US 321) and SR 95 south of Oak Ridge and north of Lenoir City. The three highways head south to an intersection with US 70 and I-75 in Lenoir City. They then continue southeast to intersect US 11 in Lenoir City. SR 95 leaves US 321 and SR 73 south of Lenoir City, The two highways head east into Blount County traveling just south of Friendsville. On the edge of Maryville the highways have a short concurrency with SR 335 and intersect US 129, in downtown they intersect US 411 and SR 33. The highways then proceed out of Maryville and intersect Foothills Parkway's western segment in Chilhowee, turn south and then back east to Townsend where the highways intersect SR 73 Scenic. US 321 and mainline SR 73 turn north and SR 73 Scenic heads east into the Great Smoky Mountains National Park. The highways then continue northeasterly through Wears Valley to Pigeon Forge where they turn south onto US 441, which is part of the Great Smoky Mountains Parkway (Parkway), and travel concurrent for 8.5 miles (13.7 km) to Gatlinburg (just before Gatlinburg, they have an interchange with Gatlinburg Bypass), where SR 73 and US 321 turn east onto East Parkway and US 441 heads south. They then absorb and begin a concurrency with SR 32 in Cosby and intersect Foothills Parkway's eastern segment. SR 73 then leaves US 321 and SR 32 south of Newport. It then has a second interchange with I-40 and heads northerly to terminate at US 25 and US 70 on the east side of Newport.

Between Lenoir City and the second intersection with SR 32 in Cosby, SR 73 is an unsigned primary highway designated east–west. For the rest of its length, it is a signed secondary highway designated north–south.

== Junction list ==
County	Location	mi	km	Destinations	Notes
Loudon	Lenoir City	0	0.0	I-40 / US 321 begin / SR 95 north (White Wing Road) – Oak Ridge, Knoxville, Nashville	Northern terminus of US 321, western terminus of SR 73 and begin US 321 and SR 95 overlap; I-40 exit 364; SR 73 begins as an unsigned primary highway
Loudon	Lenoir City			US 70 (Kingston Pike/SR 1) – Kingston, Knoxville	
Loudon	Lenoir City			I-75 – Chattanooga, Knoxville	I-75 exit 81
Loudon	Lenoir City			US 11 (Broadway Street) – Loudon, Farragut	
Loudon	Lenoir City			SR 444 west (Tellico Parkway) – Tellico Village	Interchange; eastern terminus of SR 444
Loudon				SR 95 south – Greenback	east end of SR 95 overlap
Blount	Friendsville			SR 333 north (E Main Avenue)	Southern terminus of SR 333
Blount	Maryville			SR 335 south (William Blount Drive)	Begin SR 335 overlap
Blount	Maryville			SR 335 north (Old Glory Road)	End SR 335 overlap
Blount	Maryville			SR 446 east (Foothills Mall Drive) to US 129 – Foothills Mall	Western terminus of SR 446
Blount	Maryville			US 129 (Alcoa Highway/SR 115) – Alcoa, Robbinsville	Provides access to McGhee Tyson Airport
Blount	Maryville			US 411 (West Broadway Ave/SR 33) – Rockford, Madisonville	
Blount	Maryville			SR 336 south (Montvale Road)	Northern terminus of SR 336
Blount	Maryville			SR 447 north (S Washington Street) to US 411 – Alcoa	SR 447 is unsigned it is just signed as a connector to US 411/SR 35; southern terminus
Blount	Walland			Foothills Parkway – Top of The World, Chilhowee Lake, Great Smoky Mountains National Park Look Rock area	Interchange
Blount	Townsend			SR 73 Scenic east (E Lamar Alexander Parkway/SR 337 east) – Great Smoky Mountains National Park	Western terminus of SR 73 Scenic and unsigned SR 337
Sevier	Wears Valley			Foothills Parkway	Interchange; eastern terminus of western segment of the Foothills Parkway
Sevier	Pigeon Forge			US 441 north (Parkway/SR 71 north) – Sevierville	Begin overlap with US 441/SR 71
Sevier	Pigeon Forge			SR 449 north (Dollywood Lane/Veterans Boulevard) – Dollywood	Southern terminus of SR 449
Sevier	Gatlinburg			Gatlinburg Bypass – Cherokee, Great Smoky Mountains National Park	Interchange; Northern terminus of Gatlinburg Bypass
Sevier	Gatlinburg			US 441 south / SR 73 Scenic west (Parkway/SR 71 south) – Cherokee, Great Smoky Mountains National Park	East end US 441/SR 71 overlap; eastern terminus of SR 73 scenic
Sevier	Gatlinburg–Pittman Center line			SR 454 north (Buckhorn Road)	Southern terminus of SR 454
Sevier	Pittman Center			SR 416 north (Pittman Center Road) – Sevierville	Southern terminus of SR 416
Cocke	Cosby			SR 32 south	Begin SR 32 overlap
Cocke	Cosby			Foothills Parkway to I-40	Western terminus of eastern segment of the Foothills Parkway
Cocke	Cosby			SR 339 west (Jones Cove Road) – Sevierville	Eastern terminus of SR 339
Cocke	Cosby			US 321 north / SR 32 north (Cosby Highway) – Newport	End of US 321 and SR 32 overlap; SR 73 becomes signed as a secondary highway; SR 73 changes cardinal directions from east-west to north-south
Cocke				I-40 – Knoxville, Asheville	I-40 exit 440
Cocke	Newport	101.76	163.77	US 25 / US 70 (E Broadway Street/SR 9) – Newport, Del Rio, Hot Springs	Northern terminus; SR 73 ends as a signed secondary highway
1.000 mi = 1.609 km; 1.000 km = 0.621 mi: Concurrency terminus; Unopened

== Scenic route ==
State Route 73 Scenic
- Location: Townsend–Great Smoky Mountains National Park

State Route 73 Scenic (SR 73 Scenic) is a spur route of SR 73 in Blount and Sevier counties in the eastern portion of Tennessee. It serves as a connector route into the Great Smoky Mountains National Park. The road runs from Townsend to southwest of Gatlinburg. The route is also called Fighting Creek Gap Road from US 441 to the Elkmont Campground entrance and Little River Gorge Road to the Townsend Entrance Road. The Great Smoky Mountains National Park, as well as many locals, often refer to this stretch of park road as "Little River Road" as this road follows the former roadbed of the Little River Railroad along the Little River from the Townsend entrance to the Park to Elkmont.

It begins at US 321 and mainline SR 73 in Townsend and heads east into the Great Smoky Mountains National Park and ends its signed portion at Laurel Creek Road which goes to Cades Cove. The unsigned portion begins and continues through the park to end at US 441 in the park south of Gatlinburg, It then becomes signed again and turns north on to US 441/SR 71 and follows US 441/SR 71 for 2.7 miles (4.3 km) to US 321/SR 73 in downtown Gatlinburg where it ends. The portion in Gatlinburg is the southern segment of the Great Smoky Mountains Parkway.

TDOT has this route internally designated as State Route 337 (SR 337).

SR 73 Scenic was formerly a portion of SR 73, which was moved to US 321 when that route was extended to the area in 1981.

Despite being signed Secondary on TDOT maps, in Gatlinburg, SR 73 Scenic is signed primary with the concurrency of US 441/SR 71 throughout the Great Smoky Mountains National Park. It is also signed as Primary along East Parkway (US 321).

Junctions

County	Location	mi	km	Destinations	Notes
Blount	Townsend			US 321 (East Lamar Alexander Parkway/Townsend Entrance Road/SR 73) – Maryville, Pigeon Forge	Western terminus
Blount	Great Smoky Mountains National Park			Laurel Creek Road – Cades Cove	
Sevier	Great Smoky Mountains National Park			Wear Gap Road – Wears Valley	
Sevier	Great Smoky Mountains National Park			Elkmont Road – Elkmont	
Sevier	Great Smoky Mountains National Park			US 441 south (Newfound Gap Road/SR 71 south) – Gatlinburg, Cherokee	Western end of US 441/SR 71 concurrency
Sevier	Great Smoky Mountains National Park			Gatlinburg Bypass – Pigeon Forge	Interchange
Sevier	Gatlinburg			US 441 north / US 321 north (East Parkway/Parkway/SR 71 north/SR 73 north) – Pigeon Forge, Cosby	Eastern terminus
1.000 mi = 1.609 km; 1.000 km = 0.621 mi
