= U.S. Route 441 in Tennessee =

U.S. Highway in Tennessee

U.S. Route 441
- US 441 highlighted in red

Route information
- Maintained by TDOT and NPS
- Length: 83.28 mi (134.03 km)
- Existed: October 21, 1951–present
- Tourist routes: Newfound Gap Road Byway; Norris Freeway

Major junctions
- South end: US 441 at the North Carolina state line in the Great Smoky Mountains National Park
- Gatlinburg Bypass in Gatlinburg; US 321 in Gatlinburg; SR 449 in Sevierville; US 411 / SR 66 in Sevierville; I-40 / I-275 / SR 62 in Knoxville; I-640 / US 25W / SR 331 in Fountain City; SR 33 / SR 131 in Halls Crossroads; SR 61 in Norris; I-75 in Rocky Top
- North end: US 25W / SR 116 in Rocky Top

Location
- Country: United States
- State: Tennessee
- Counties: Sevier, Blount, Knox, Anderson, Campbell

Highway system
- United States Numbered Highway System; List; Special; Divided; Tennessee State Routes; Interstate; US; State
← I-440	→ SR 441

U.S. Route 441 (US 441) stretches for 83.28 miles (134.03 km) through the mountains of East Tennessee, connecting Rocky Top with Knoxville, Sevierville, Gatlinburg, and the Great Smoky Mountains National Park, crossing into North Carolina at Newfound Gap. Near its northern terminus, US 441 crosses over Norris Dam and passes through Norris Dam State Park. US 441 was extended into Tennessee in 1951 to provide a US Route designation through the Great Smoky Mountains National Park, which had been advocated for many years prior.

US 441 is the main road through the Great Smoky Mountains National Park, and is called Newfound Gap Road. This road was constructed by the state in the late 1920s and improved by the National Park Service (NPS) in the 1930s, and is maintained by the NPS. Between Gatlinburg and Sevierville, US 441 is part of the Great Smoky Mountains Parkway, the main thoroughfare that serves the national park and related tourist attractions in Gatlinburg, Pigeon Forge, and Sevierville. This section of US 441 is one of the busiest surface roads in Tennessee, and also contains a spur of the Foothills Parkway. Between Knoxville and Sevierville, US 441 is part of Chapman Highway, which was originally part of the main road to the national park before Interstate 40. From north of Knoxville to its northern terminus US 441 is called Norris Freeway, a road constructed by the Tennessee Valley Authority (TVA) in the 1930s to serve Norris Dam.

== Route description ==
=== Sevier County ===
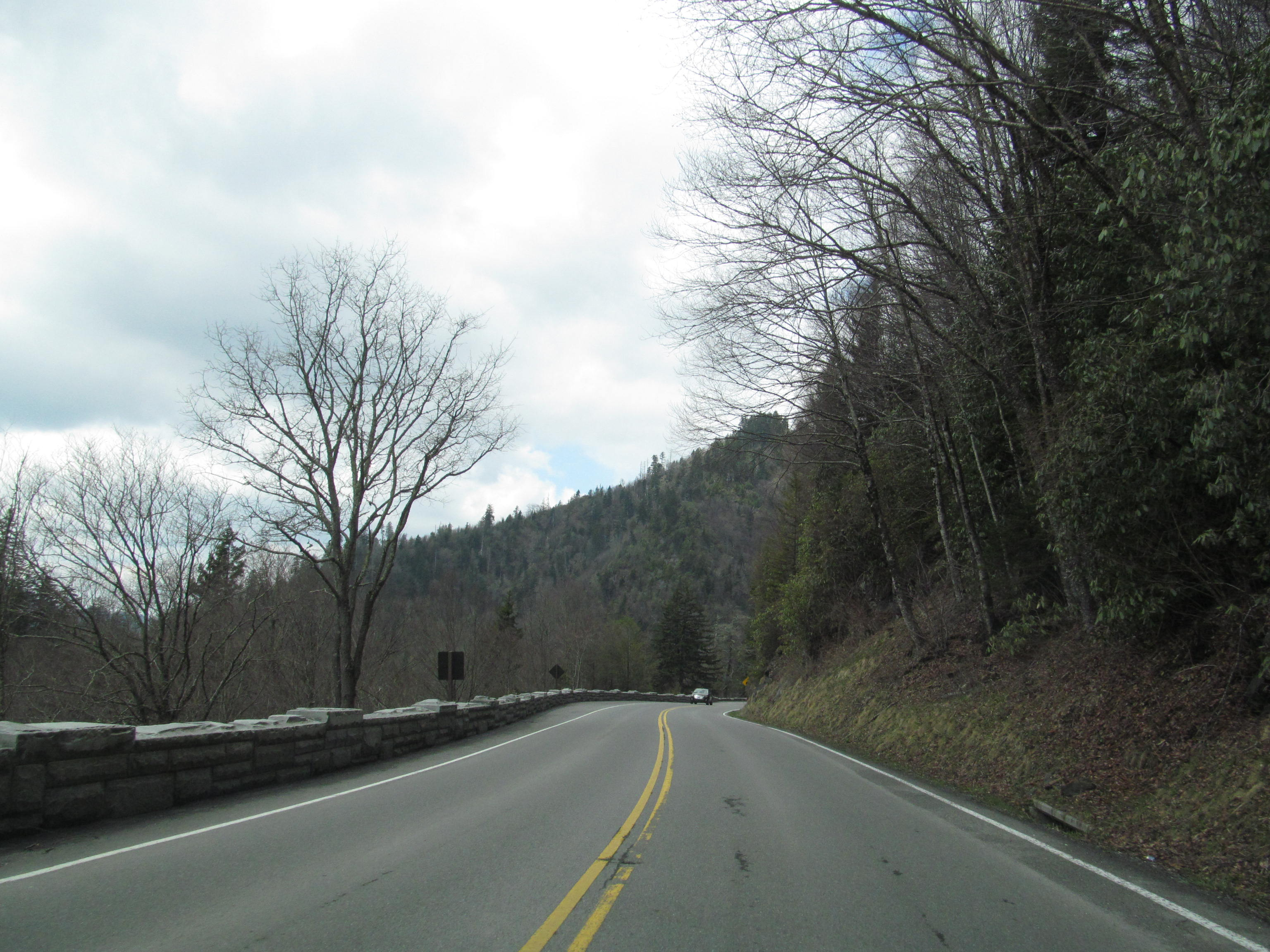
US 441/Newfound Gap Road in the Great Smoky Mountains National Park

US 441 enters Tennessee within the Great Smoky Mountains National Park at the North Carolina state line on Newfound Gap, at an elevation of 5,048 feet (1,539 m) above sea level. Here, SR 71 begins as US 441's unsigned companion route. US 441/SR 71 is known as Newfound Gap Road within the park, and follows along a valley carved by the West Prong of the Little Pigeon River as a narrow and curvy two-lane highway. Along this descent, the roadway features several scenic overlooks. It also passes through multiple tunnels, including an unusual section where the road loops over itself. Newfound Gap Road then runs concurrently with SR 73 Scenic at an intersection near the Sugarlands Visitor Center, where this road continues as Little River Road. A short distance later, the road has a partial-access controlled interchange with the Gatlinburg Bypass, and enters the city of Gatlinburg. Here, US 441/SR 71/SR 73 Scenic leaves the park and becomes Great Smoky Mountains Parkway (Parkway), a four-lane undivided highway as it passes through the city. Parkway then has an intersection with US 321/SR 73 (East Parkway), where SR 73 Scenic ends and US 321/SR 73 joins Parkway. Parkway heads north to have another interchange with the Gatlinburg Bypass before leaving Gatlinburg and becoming a divided highway known as the Foothills Parkway Spur (more commonly known as The Spur or the Gatlinburg Spur). The spur immediately has in interchange with the northern terminus of the Gatlinburg Bypass. A few miles later, US 441 then enters the city of Pigeon Forge and widens to a six-lane highway.

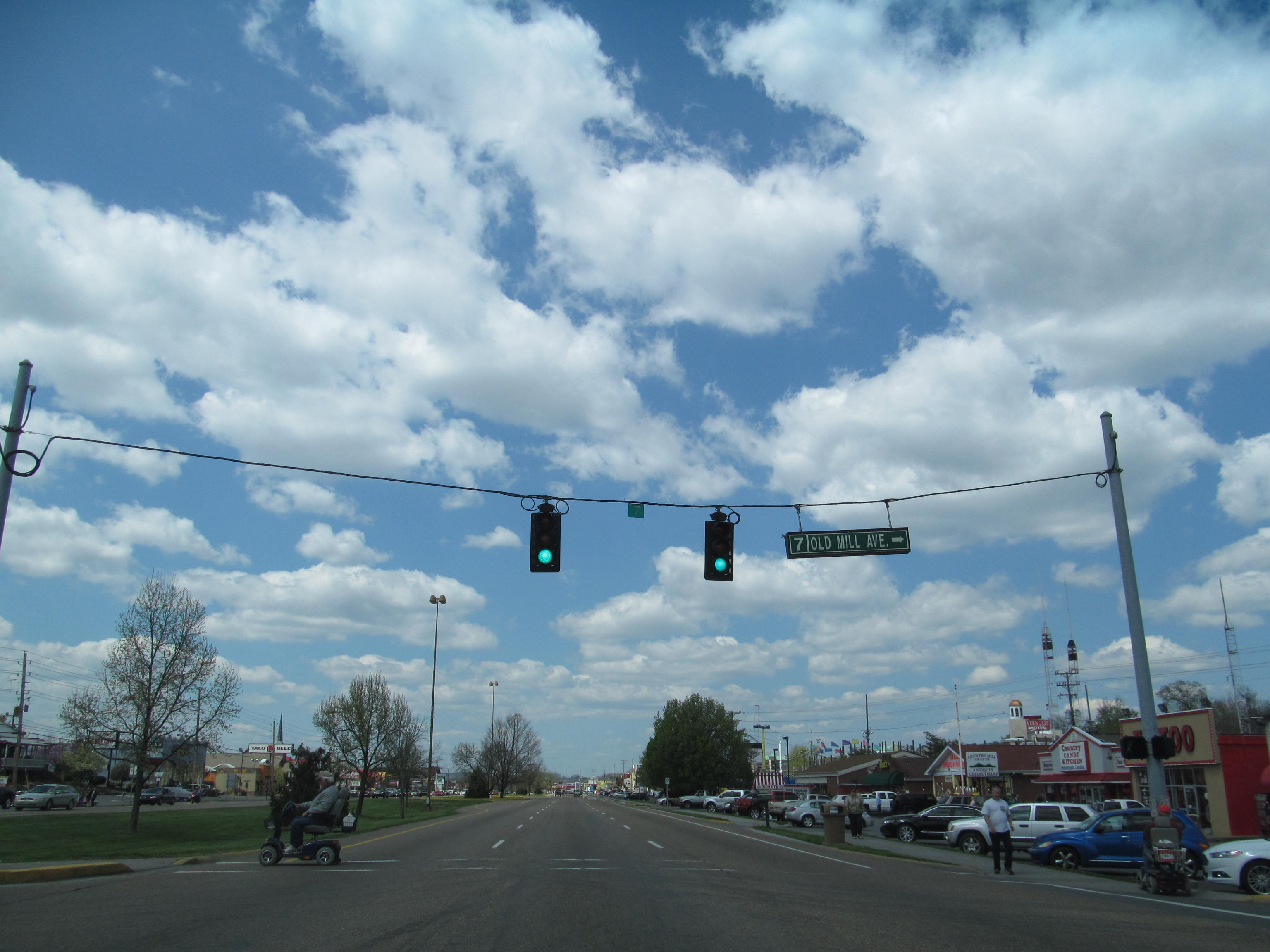
"The Strip" section of US 441/Great Smoky Mountains Parkway in Pigeon Forge

US 441 through the city and has an intersection with SR 449 (Dollywood Lane/Veterans Boulevard) before US 321/SR 73 head north along Wears Valley Road. US 441/SR 71 (Parkway) then crosses a bridge over the West Prong of the Little Pigeon River to enter Sevierville. They pass by several tourist attractions and a Tanger Outlets before again crossing the West Prong of the Little Pigeon River and turning of the Parkway and north onto Forks of the River Parkway at the southern edge of downtown. They bypass downtown on the west side as an undivided highway before coming to an intersection with SR 66 (Winfield Dunn Parkway) and US 411/SR 35 (W Main Street), where US 441/SR 71 turns left to become concurrent with US 411/SR 35 as a four-lane undivided highway known as Chapman Highway. Chapman Highway then crosses a bridge over West Prong of the Little Pigeon River and leaves Sevierville as a divided highway through rural areas. It then passes through some mountainous areas as an undivided highway before entering Seymour. Chapman Highway passes by several homes and businesses before coming to an intersection with SR 338 (Boyds Creek Highway), where US 411/SR 35 heads south along Maryville Highway. US 441/SR 71 (Chapman Highway) continues north to pass through a small portion of Blount County before leaving Seymour and crossing into Knox County.

=== Knox County ===
US 441/SR 71 (Chapman Highway) passes through suburban areas as it enters South Knoxville. It has an interchange with SR 168 (Governor John Sevier Highway) before passing through a business district. SR 71 then breaks off along E Moody Avenue just before becoming concurrent with SR 33 (Martin Mill Pike) and crossing the Tennessee River into downtown Knoxville via the Henley Street Bridge. US 441/SR 33 passes through downtown as a six-lane divided highway (known as Henley Street), where it has a partial interchange with I-40/I-275 and an intersection with SR 62 (Western Avenue). The highway narrows to a two-lane undivided to cross a bridge over some railroad tracks before passing under I-40 and passing through neighborhoods as Broadway. US 441/SR 33 then have a partial interchange with Hall of Fame Drive (unsigned SR 71), with SR 71 rejoining US 441/SR 33, where the roadway widens to four-lanes. Broadway then crosses Sharp's Ridge to enter Fountain City, where it has an intersection with SR 331 (Old Broadway) and an interchange with I-640/US 25W/SR 9 (Exit 6). Broadway has a partial interchange with SR 331 (Tazewell Pike) before it passes through a business district before passing through downtown. It then becomes a divided highway as it crosses a ridge, where it leaves Fountain City and Knoxville to enter Halls Crossroads. Broadway now becomes Maynardville Pike and passes through suburban areas and business districts before US 441/SR 71 splits off from SR 33 (Maynardville Pike) along Norris Freeway as a four-lane undivided highway shortly before having an intersection with SR 131 (E Emory Road). The highway then narrows to two-lanes and leaves Halls Crossroads to pass through rural areas. It then becomes concurrent with SR 170 (Old Raccoon Valley Road) before crossing into Anderson County.

=== Anderson County ===
SR 170 splits off from US 441/SR 71 (Norris Freeway) along Hickory Valley Road before US 441/SR 71 continues north through rural areas to enter the city of Norris, where they have a short concurrency with SR 61 (Andersonville Highway/Charles G. Seviers Boulevard) before passing through Norris Dam State Park and crossing the Clinch River on top of the Norris Dam. The highway turns east and becomes windy and curvy as its crosses into Campbell County twice for short distances before re entering Anderson County to enter Rocky Top. US 441/SR 71 then have an interchange with I-75 (Exit 128) and widen to an undivided four-lane shortly before coming to an end at an intersection with US 25W/SR 9/SR 116 (N Main Street) just north of downtown.

== History ==
=== Early history and Newfound Gap Road construction ===
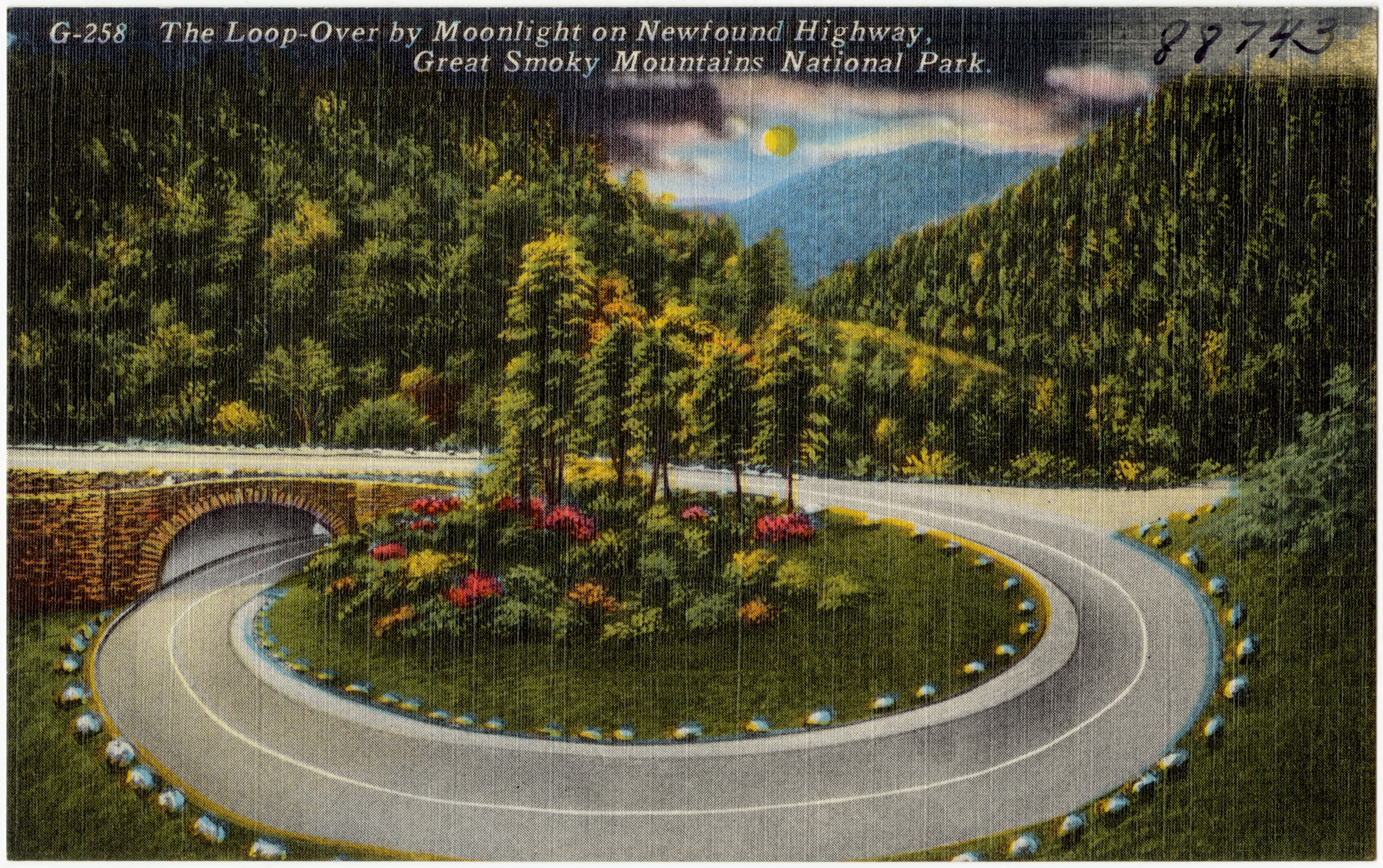
Postcard of the Loop Over Bridge on US 441 (Newfound Gap Road) in the Great Smoky Mountains National Park

The route that is now US 441 roughly follows multiple Native American trails that existed for many centuries before the arrival of European settlers. Cherokee hunters, as well as other Native American peoples before them, used a footpath known as the Indian Gap Trail to access the abundant game in the forests and coves of the Great Smoky Mountains. This trail connected the Great Indian Warpath with Rutherford Indian Trace, following the West Fork of the Little Pigeon River from modern-day Sevierville through modern-day Pigeon Forge, Gatlinburg, and the Sugarlands, crossing the crest of the Smokies along the slopes of Mount Collins, and descending into North Carolina along the banks of the Oconaluftee River. In the 1830s, the road was expanded to a width of five feet (1.5 m), and became a toll road, with charges for pedestrians, riders, vehicles, and livestock. The road was steep, rocky, rutted, and regularly blocked by fallen trees, and travelers often opted for longer, less treacherous routes around the mountains. During the American Civil War, Colonel William Holland Thomas and a party of 600 Cherokees further improved the trail into a road that was used by both Union and Confederate forces. In the early 20th century a bridge across the little Pigeon River called Banner Bridge also existed in the gorge between Gatlinburg and Pigeon Forge. The road between Knoxville and Sevierville roughly follows the location of part of the Great Indian Warpath.

On October 1, 1923, SR 71 was established along the Indian Gap Trail between Indian Gap at the North Carolina state line and the present intersection of US 411 with US 441 (then SR 65) in Sevierville. This was one of the first 78 numbered state routes designated in Tennessee. On July 8, 1927, a contract was awarded to grade and drain the section of SR 71 through Gatlinburg, and this was completed on July 12, 1930. A contract to surface treat the section between Pigeon Forge and Sevierville was awarded on June 15, 1928, and was completed on September 30, 1930. A group of proponents of the national park began pushing for improvements to Newfound Gap Road in 1924. While Indian Gap had historically been the location of the main route through the Smokies, Newfound Gap was chosen for the new road due to better grades, although the NPS preferred the former route. Surveys were completed by both states in July 1926, and the first contract in Tennessee was awarded in July 1927. While the road between Gatlinburg and Newfound Gap was completed in the summer of 1929, it was officially opened to the state line on April 6, 1932, and completed in North Carolina shortly thereafter. That year, SR 71 was rerouted onto Newfound Gap Road. The old road followed the approximate location of the Road Prong Trail between Indian Gap and the Chimney Tops trailhead. Between April 1933 and July 1938, the NPS, Bureau of Public Roads, and Civilian Conservation Corps further improved Newfound Gap Road. This included construction of the Loop Over Bridge, which replaced a two tight switchbacks and was finished in November 1935. Other projects included moving the road from the east to the west side of the Little River, expanding the parking area at Newfound Gap, and improving overlooks and parking areas at trailheads. New architectural features were designed to blend in with the natural landscape.

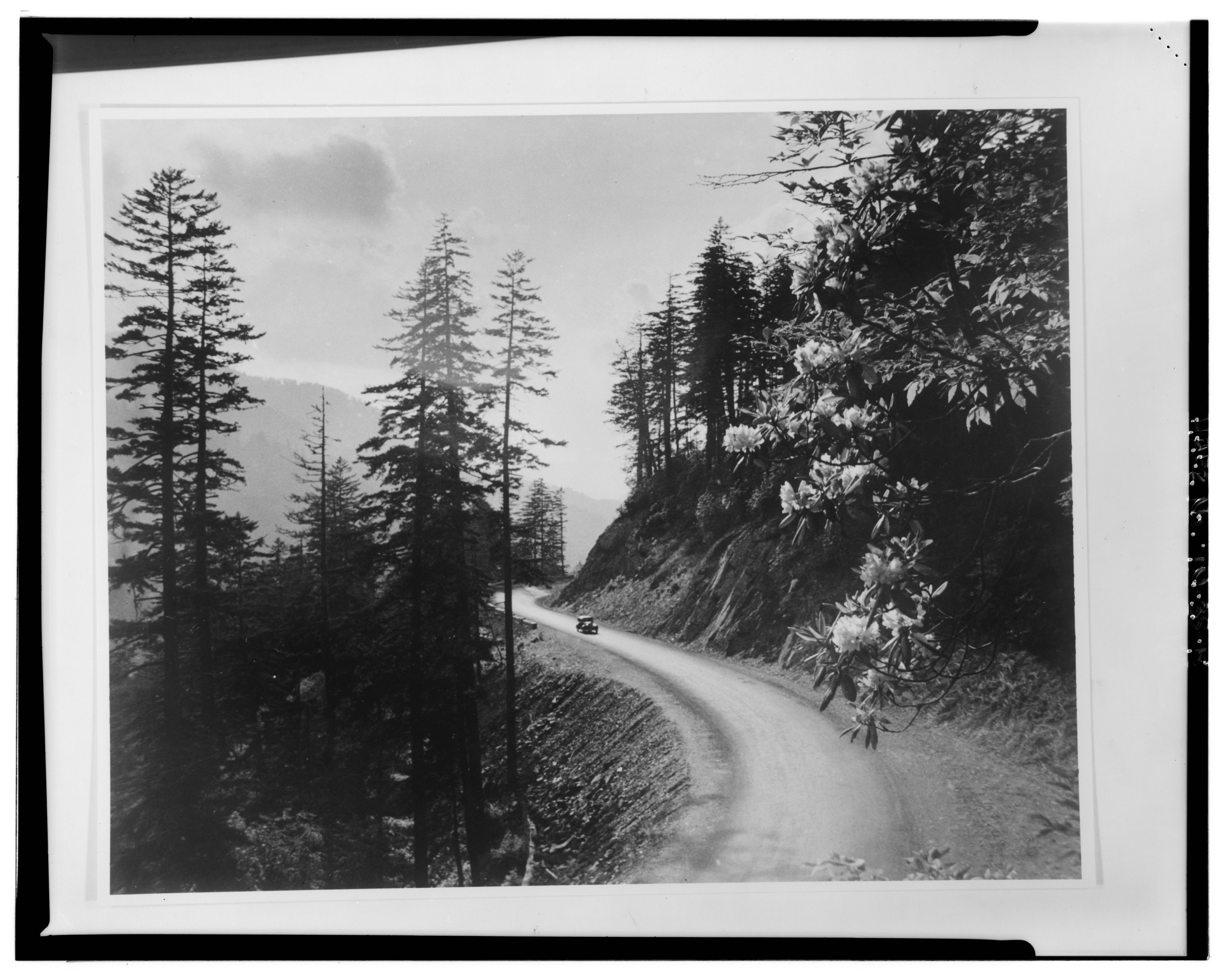
Photograph of Newfound Gap Road, c. 1936, by George A. Grant

While construction was underway on Newfound Gap Road, the Tennessee Valley Authority (TVA) constructed Norris Freeway in 1934 to serve the Norris Dam construction site. The road was designed with few access points to facilitate efficient transportation of materials to the dam site. It was also constructed as a scenic road, inspired by the City Beautiful movement, with billboards restricted. In December 1934, paving was completed on Chapman Highway between Knoxville and Sevierville. The road through Gatlinburg was expanded to four lanes in 1939. On September 14, 1945, a $9 million (equivalent to $124 million in 2024) plan to improve roads within and around the park was announced by the BPR, which included construction of the four-lane highway that is now US 441 between Gatlinburg and Knoxville. Construction of the Gatlinburg Spur was repeatedly delayed due to disagreements between the state, NPS, BPR, Sevier County government, and other agencies between 1939 and 1951. Around 1950, SR 73 was extended onto a concurrency with SR 71 through Gatlinburg as part of an eastward extension of this route to Cosby. On October 21, 1951, the American Association of State Highway Officials (AASHO) approved extending US 441 into Tennessee, and SR 71 and SR 73 became hidden companion designations.

=== Great Smoky Mountains Parkway, Gatlinburg Spur, and Chapman Highway improvements ===
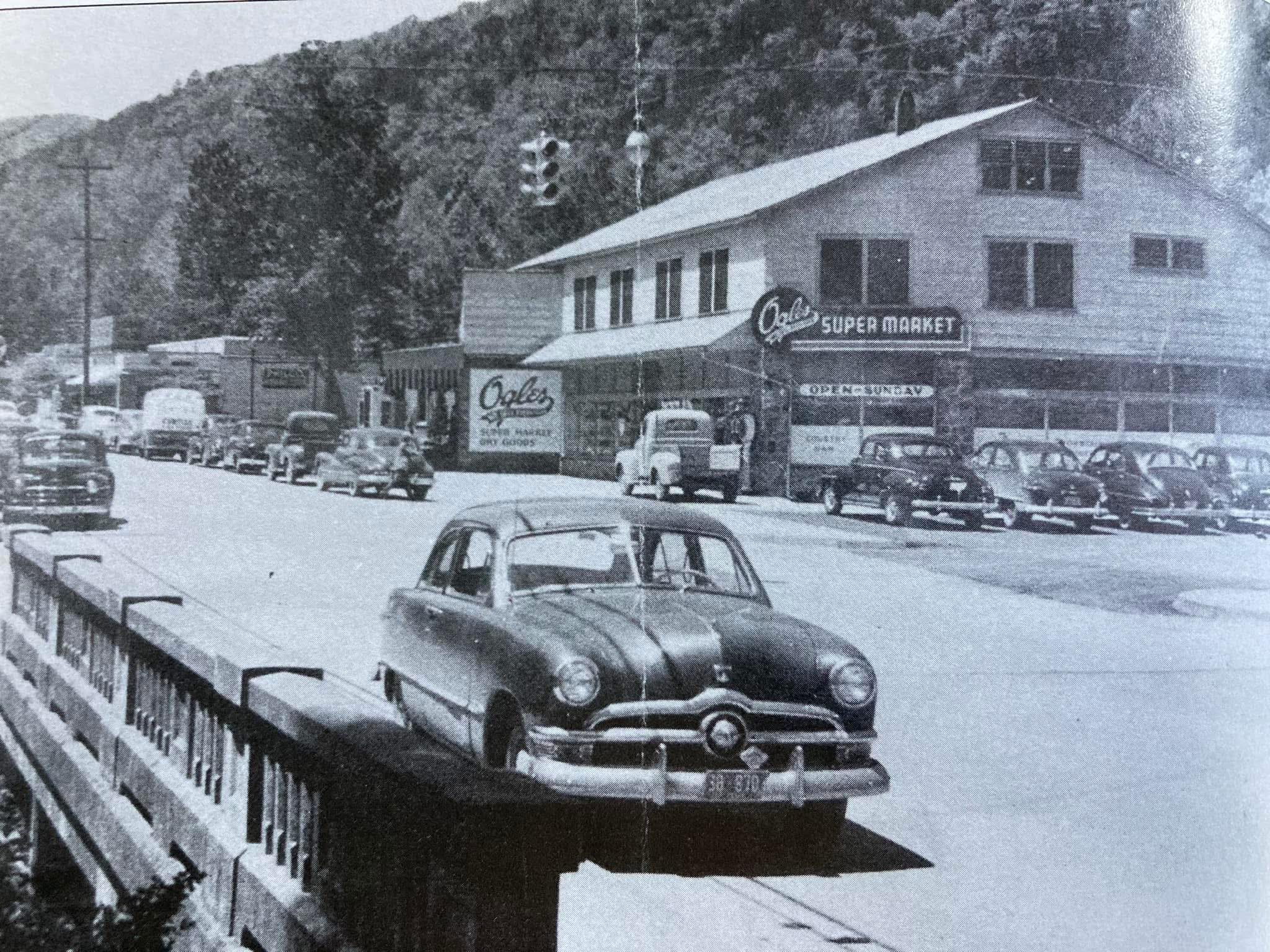
US 441 in downtown Gatlinburg in the 1950s.

In 1949 and 1950, the 0.4-mile-long (0.64 km) segment of the road in Gatlinburg extending to Dudley Creek on the north end was expanded to four lanes. In preparation for construction of the Gatlinburg Spur, work to construct a new four-lane bridge over Dudley Creek in Gatlinburg began on September 26, 1951, and was completed on September 19, 1952. Work finally began on the spur with the bridge over the West Prong of the Little Pigeon River, constructed between September 27, 1951, and November 3, 1952. Work on the southern segment of the Gatlinburg Spur began on September 16, 1952, and a temporary alignment opened to traffic on July 14, 1953. Final completion of the project occurred on May 27, 1954. Construction on the section of the spur between Banner Bridge and Caney Creek south of Pigeon Forge began on April 25, 1957, and was completed on October 29, 1958, with the exception of the northbound tunnel, which opened on March 3, 1959, and initially carried only one lane. These improvements coincided with widening US 441 (Chapman Highway) between Knoxville and Sevierville, which, combined with the parkway, was the primary means of access to the national park at the time.

Once the northbound lanes of the spur were complete, reconstruction of the southbound lanes began on September 17, 1959. The project was slated for completion in June 1961, but was delayed by rockslides that spring. After the slides continued to worsen, construction was suspended on August 25, 1961. The reconstruction was completed on December 22, 1961, with the exception of the slide area. One of the slide areas was reopened on May 18, 1962, after the debris was removed. The other slide debris proved more difficult to clear, a process that was not completed until June 1, 1962. As originally planned, maintenance of the Gatlinburg Spur was to be turned over to the state highway department once construction was complete. In January 1969, the NPS sent letters to Tennessee's congressional delegation asking them to introduce legislation to initiate this transfer, although some NPS personnel were concerned that the state would allow commercialization and billboards along the route. President Richard Nixon signed a resolution authorizing this transfer on August 9, 1969. However, the highway department refused to accept the road unless the NPS made certain improvements, which they subsequently refused. As a result, the spur has remained under the jurisdiction of the NPS.

On June 13, 1947, a contract was awarded to construct a new 7.3-mile (11.7 km) alignment between the gorge and US 411 in Sevierville, which was four lanes from Caney Creek to near the present-day US 321 (Wears Valley Road) and two lanes elsewhere. This new road opened to traffic in March 1950 with a temporary oil surfacing, although it was not yet paved. A contract to pave this was awarded on December 3, 1954, and construction was completed on November 21, 1955. The Chapman Highway section of US 441 was widened to four lanes throughout the 1950s. A contract to widen the last section of US 441 between the national park and Knoxville to four lanes, the 4.3-mile (6.9 km) section between northern Pigeon Forge and downtown, was awarded on June 24, 1966, with completion slated for July 1967.

=== Later history ===
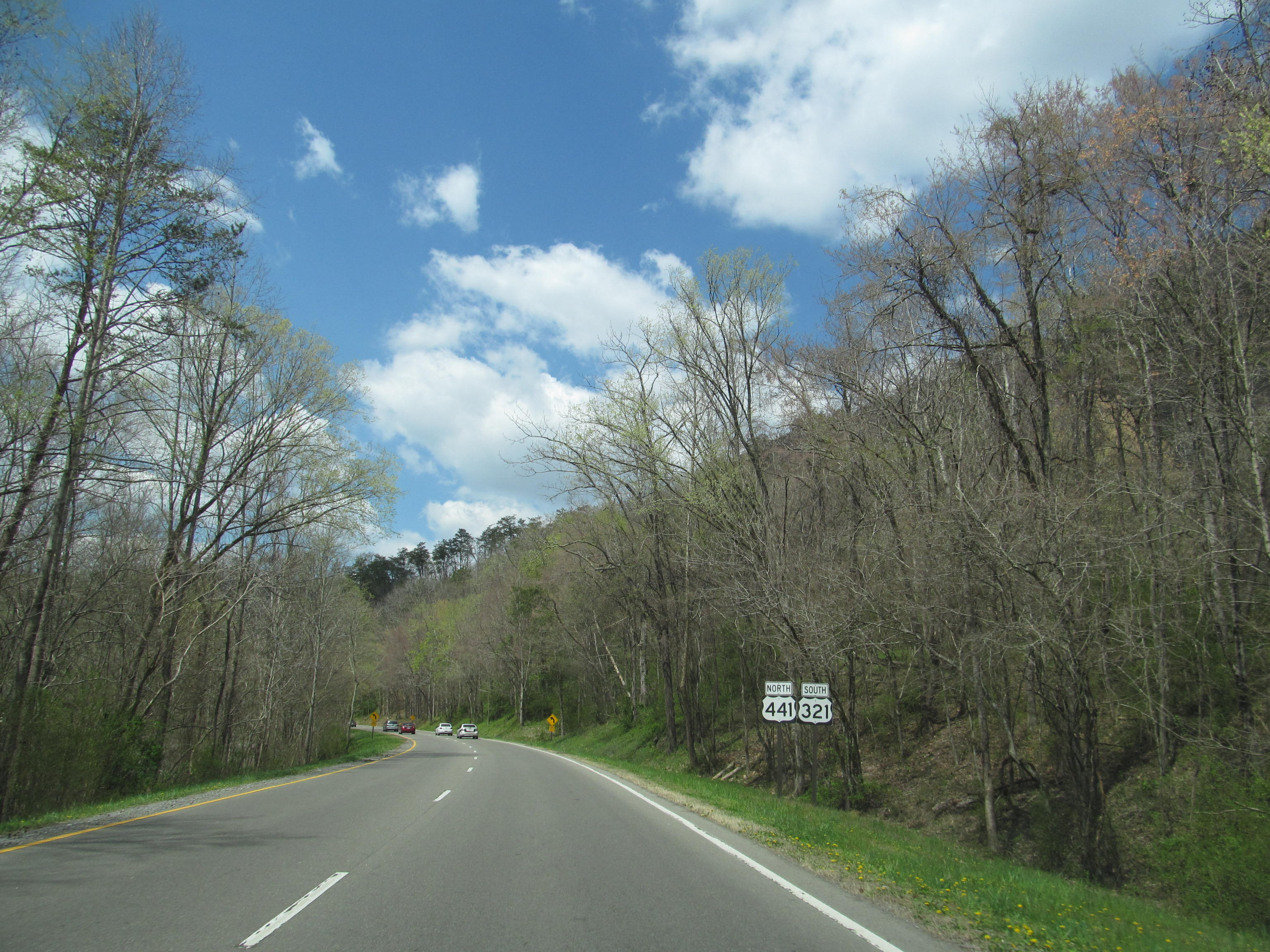
The northbound lanes of the Gatlinburg Spur section of US 441

The completion of I-40 in 1975 resulted in the Chapman Highway section of US 441 no longer being part of the main route to the Great Smoky Mountains National Park. The SR 66 portion of the parkway between US 411/441 and I-40 in Kodak, part of which was constructed in conjunction with I-40, became the main route, along with I-40, resulting in a large decrease in traffic on Chapman Highway. Sidewalks were installed along US 441 in Pigeon Forge in 1978. On October 3, 1981, AASHTO approved an extension of US 321 in Tennessee, which included the segment concurrent with US 441. This was created to provide a continuous highway numbering designation for motorists who choose to use the scenic routes to access the park instead of I-40. As part of this renumbering, SR 73 was rerouted to become a companion route of US 321 along the parkway, and the original segment through Gatlinburg was redesignated SR 73 Scenic. In recent years, TDOT and the city of Knoxville have undertaken safety improvements to Chapman Highway, which have included adding two-way left turn lanes to formerly four-lane undivided sections, intersection improvements and realignments, and construction of bicycle and pedestrian infrastructure.

As tourism to the Great Smoky Mountains increased and new attractions sprung up along the parkway part of US 441 in Gatlinburg and Pigeon Forge, traffic congestion continued to worsen. A tourism boom was attributed to the 1982 World's Fair in Knoxville, and the congestion problem was particularly exacerbated with the opening of Dollywood in 1986. That year the Strip section of US 441 through Pigeon Forge between the Gatlinburg Spur and US 321 was expanded by restriping right turn lanes and shoulders to add a third lane in each direction and cutting additional turn lanes into the median. Also that year, Pigeon Forge began running a trolley system along US 441 to serve Dollywood and other tourist hotspots. The 1.5-mile (2.4 km) section of the parkway between US 321 (Wears Valley Road) in Pigeon Forge and the Little Pigeon River was widened to six lanes between late 1989 and May 1991.

On November 5, 1990, construction began to lower the roadway in the northbound tunnel on the Gatlinburg Spur to allow for two lanes, eliminating the traffic bottleneck here. During this time, the tunnel was completely closed, and northbound traffic was routed onto the southbound lanes of the spur. The tunnel was reopened during the tourist season in 1991, but closed by November 2 of that year to allow the next phase to proceed. The project was completed in May 1992. Northbound traffic on the spur was originally reduced from two lanes to one at the Gatlinburg Bypass interchange, creating another bottleneck; the northbound bypass ramp then merged to become a second lane once again. In August 1993, work began on a project to remove this chokepoint, which consisted of widening the northbound parkway to two continuous lanes through the interchange, and constructing a merge lane for traffic transitioning from the bypass to the northbound parkway. Initially slated for completion on March 31, 1994, the project was repeatedly delayed by geological issues, weather conditions, and equipment problems. Construction was suspended two months later to make way for summer traffic, and resumed in November, with completion slated by the end of the year. In March 1997, Native American artifacts from the Early Woodland period were discovered when construction began to widen the section of US 441 between the Pigeon River in northern Pigeon Forge and US 411 in Sevierville to six lanes. The project was planned for completion by November 1998, but ran into a roughly year-long delay caused by late utility adjustments.

The interchange with I-640 in Knoxville was reconstructed in two phases. The first phase took place between January 2000 and June 2003 and eliminated a loop exit ramp from I-640 eastbound, reconfigured parts of the other ramps, and widened part of I-640. The next phase, from April 2016 to July 2019, lengthened the exit ramp from I-640 westbound, and built a new loop entrance ramp from US 441 northbound onto I-640. The NPS completed a study that analyzed traffic issues on the Gatlinburg Spur and potential improvements in June 2019, and an environmental assessment was completed in May 2022. The first phase, which consists of paving shoulders, replacing outdated or damaged guardrails, and safety improvements at gravel pull-offs, began on January 5, 2026, and was expected to be completed on April 14, 2026. Future projects will include bridge replacements and rehabilitations, minor roadway realignments, and rockfall mitigation.

== Major intersections ==
County	Location	mi	km	Destinations	Notes
Sevier	Great Smoky Mountains National Park	0.0	0.0	US 441 south (Newfound Gap Road) – Cherokee	Continuation into North Carolina
Sevier	Great Smoky Mountains National Park			SR 73 Scenic west (Little River Road/SR 337 west) – Townsend, Elkmont, Cades Cove	Southern end of SR 73 Scenic concurrency
Sevier	Great Smoky Mountains National Park			Gatlinburg Bypass north – Pigeon Forge	Southern terminus of Gatlinburg Bypass
Sevier	Gatlinburg			US 321 north (East Parkway/SR 73 east) – Pittman Center, Cosby, Newport	Southern end of wrong-way concurrency with US 321/SR 73; eastern terminus of SR 73 Scenic
Sevier	Gatlinburg			Gatlinburg Bypass south – Cherokee	Interchange; no northbound access
Sevier	Pigeon Forge			SR 449 north (Dollywood Lane/Veterans Parkway) – Dollywood	Southern terminus of SR 449
Sevier	Pigeon Forge			US 321 south (Wears Valley Road/SR 73 west) – Wears Valley, Townsend	Northern end of wrong-way concurrency with US 321/SR 73
Sevier	Sevierville			Parkway to SR 66 (Winfield Dunn Parkway) / SR 448 (North Parkway)	
Sevier	Sevierville			US 411 north (West Main Street/SR 35 north) / SR 66 / I-40 north (Winfield Dunn Parkway) – Newport, Kodak	Southern end of wrong-way concurrency with US 411/SR 35; southern terminus of SR 66
Sevier	Seymour			US 411 south (Maryville Highway/SR 35 south) – Maryville, Alcoa SR 338 north (Boyds Creek Highway) – Boyds Creek	Northern end of wrong-way concurrency with US 411/SR 35; southern terminus of SR 338
Knox	South Knoxville			SR 168 (Governor John Sevier Highway) – Johnson University, Strawberry Plains	Interchange
Knox	South Knoxville			E Moody Avenue (SR 71 north) to South Knox Boulevard	Northern end of SR 71 concurrency
Knox	South Knoxville			SR 33 south (Martin Mill Pike) – Rockford	Southern end of SR 33 concurrency
Knox	Knoxville			Henley Street Bridge over the Tennessee River	
Knox	Knoxville			Main Street (east)/Cumberland Avenue (west) - University of Tennessee, West Knoxville	Former southern end of US 11/US 70/SR 1 concurrency
Knox	Knoxville			I-40 / I-275 – Nashville, Asheville, NC, Lexington, KY	I-40 exit 388; I-275 exit 0A
Knox	Knoxville			SR 62 west (Western Avenue) – Karns, Oak Ridge	Eastern terminus of SR 62
Knox	Knoxville			West Fifth Avenue – Asheville, NC	Former northern end of US 11/US 70/SR 1 concurrency; SR 33 turns primary
Knox	Knoxville			Hall of Fame Drive (unsigned SR 71 south)	Southbound exit and northbound entrance; southern end of SR 71 concurrency: to US 11/US 70/SR 1 and Women's Basketball Hall of Fame
Knox	Fountain City			SR 331 north (Old Broadway) – Corryton	Southern terminus of SR 331
Knox	Fountain City			I-640 / US 25W (SR 9) – Nashville, Asheville	I-640/US 25W exit 6
Knox	Fountain City			SR 331 north (Old Broadway) – Corryton	Interchange; northbound exit and southbound entrance
Knox	Halls Crossroads			SR 33 north (Maynardville Pike) – Maynardville	Northern end of SR 33 concurrency
Knox	Halls Crossroads			SR 131 (E Emory Road) – Powell, Gibbs	
Knox				SR 170 west (Old Raccoon Valley Road) – Heiskell, Claxton	Southern end of SR 170 concurrency
Anderson				SR 170 east (Hickory Valley Road) – New Tazewell	Northern end of SR 170 concurrency
Anderson	Norris			SR 61 (Andersonville Highway) – Andersonville, Big Ridge State Park	Southern end of SR 61 concurrency
Anderson	Norris			SR 61 west (North Charles G. Seivers Boulevard) – Clinton	Northern end of SR 61 concurrency
Clinch River				Norris Dam	
Campbell	No major junctions				
Anderson	No major junctions				
Campbell	No major junctions				
Anderson	Rocky Top			I-75 – Knoxville, Lexington	I-75 exit 128
Anderson	Rocky Top	85.8	138.1	US 25W / SR 116 (North Main Street/SR 9) – Caryville, downtown, Briceville, Clinton	Northern terminus of US 441 and SR 71
1.000 mi = 1.609 km; 1.000 km = 0.621 mi: Concurrency terminus
