= Gatlinburg Bypass =

Bypass route in Sevier County, Tennessee, United States

Gatlinburg Bypass
- Gatlinburg Bypass highlighted in red

Route information
- Maintained by NPS
- Length: 3.6 mi (5.8 km)
- Existed: January 4, 1963–present
- History: Completed June 15, 1968

Major junctions
- South end: US 441 near Gatlinburg
- North end: US 321 / US 441 in Gatlinburg

Location
- Country: United States
- State: Tennessee
- Counties: Sevier

Highway system
- Scenic Byways; National; National Forest; BLM; NPS; Tennessee State Routes; Interstate; US; State

The Gatlinburg Bypass (also known as Parkway Bypass or U.S. Route 441 Bypass) is a 3.6-mile-long (5.8 km) bypass road around the resort city of Gatlinburg in Sevier County, Tennessee, at the edge of the Great Smoky Mountains National Park. It runs between the Great Smoky Mountains Parkway (U.S. Route 321/U.S. Route 441, US 321/US 441) north of the city to Newfound Gap Road (US 441), the main route through the national park. It is owned and maintained by the National Park Service (NPS) and serves as a bypass around the business district of Gatlinburg for easier access to the national park. It is also considered part of the longer Foothills Parkway, a National Parkway that traverses the foothills of the Great Smoky Mountains. The road provides overlooks with views of the city of Gatlinburg and the mountains beyond. The Gatlinburg Bypass opened to traffic in 1968.

== Route description ==
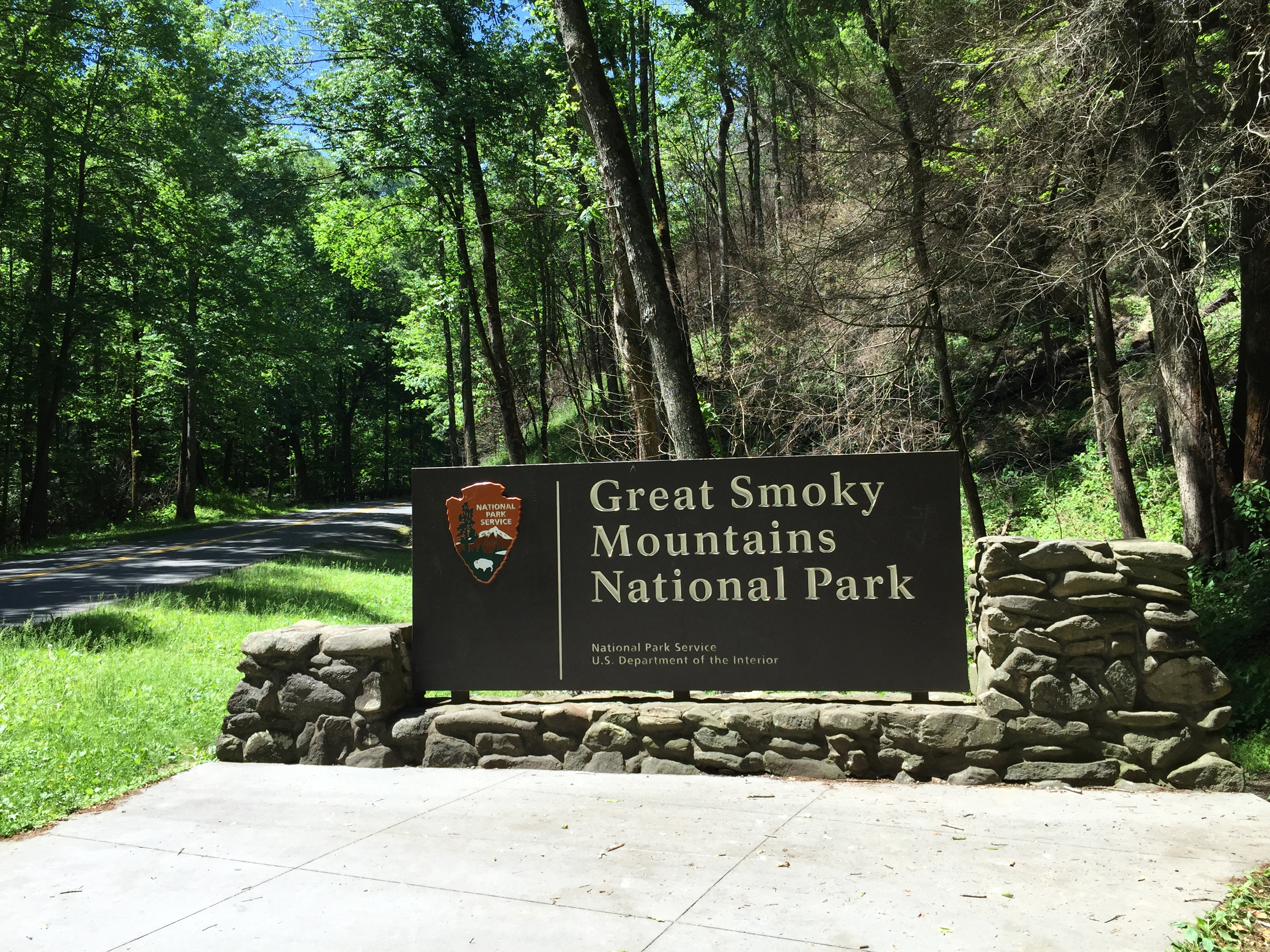
Sign at the entrance to the Great Smoky Mountains National Park along the Gatlinburg Bypass

The Gatlinburg Bypass is a two-lane road maintained by the NPS, although most of the route is located outside of the main boundaries of the Great Smoky Mountains National Park. Its main purpose is to allow tourists to bypass the congested business district of Gatlinburg in order to speed access to and from the national park. Trucks and other commercial vehicles are restricted from using the bypass, along with all other roads inside the national park. In 2025, the bypass carried an annual average daily traffic volume of 6,899 vehicles.

The Gatlinburg Bypass begins at an intersection with US 441 (Newfound Gap Road) within the Great Smoky Mountains National Park southwest of Gatlinburg. This intersection is at-grade, but includes a loop ramp and an overpass bridge. It immediately crosses over the West Prong of the Little Pigeon River, and begins a steep ascent as it traverses Cove Mountain. Two overlooks along this section provide views of Gatlinburg below and Mount Le Conte in the distance beyond. It crosses over Ski Mountain Road, the main access to Ober Gatlinburg, on a high viaduct before winding over to its only mid-route intersection at Campbell Lead Road. This road crosses over the bypass, and is accessed via a short two-way access road. After the intersection, the parkway begins a long, gradual descent down the mountain and curves from a westward to an eastward alignment in a hairpin turn. Following Cliff Branch for a short distance, the bypass next turns north and again crosses the West Prong of the Little Pigeon River, before ending at a partial directional T interchange with the Great Smoky Mountains Parkway (commonly known simply as "Parkway"), which is designated as US 321/US 441. Here, the Foothills Parkway transitions from the bypass onto the Great Smoky Mountains Parkway to the north, which is known here as the Gatlinburg Spur. The bypass is only accessible from the southbound lanes of the parkway at this interchange.

== History ==
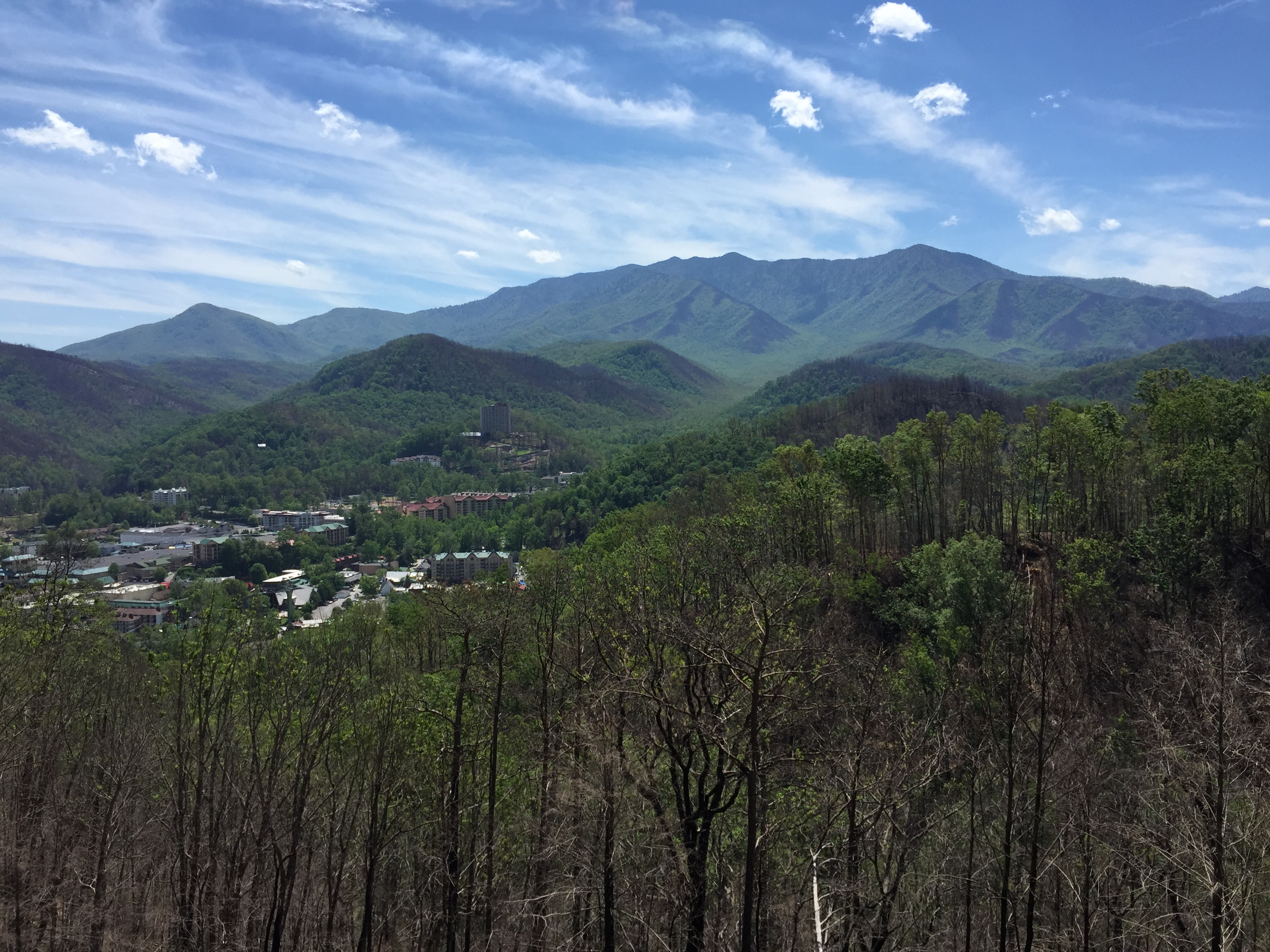
View of Gatlinburg and Mount Le Conte from an overlook on the Gatlinburg Bypass

The need for a bypass around Gatlinburg was reportedly first raised when the Great Smoky Mountains National Park was established in 1934. Preliminary planning for the bypass began in the mid-1950s as tourism to the national park surged during the post-World War II boom. A number of tourist attractions were established in Gatlinburg during this time, and the parkway through the city began to suffer from severe congestion. At the time, the Great Smoky Mountains Parkway was in the process of being widened to four lanes between Gatlinburg and Pigeon Forge, and a number of other road improvements were underway in the area to improve access to the park.

A preliminary agreement was reached in March 1959 between the Tennessee Department of Highways, the predecessor to the Tennessee Department of Transportation (TDOT), and the NPS over the design and maintenance of the road. Under this agreement, the state would purchase the right of way outside of the park, and the NPS would construct the bypass. Finalization of the agreement was stalled, however, as the NPS would not agree to an access road connection for properties along the bypass that had been requested by the highway department. By September 1960, it was reported that the state was dropping the request for the access road, but made another request two months later, which resulted in a further delay of the project by the NPS. This prompted the state to consider constructing the bypass without assistance from the park service. After further objections, the NPS agreed to provide an access point at Campbell Lead Road in April 1962 if the state would agree to a permanent prohibition of commercial vehicles on the bypass, along with a permanent restriction on US 441 through the national park once Interstate 40 was completed east of the park. This agreement was finalized by the NPS and the Great Smoky Mountains Conservation Association in June 1962.

On January 4, 1963, the final agreement on the Gatlinburg Bypass between the state and the NPS was signed by then-Governor Buford Ellington. Work on the northern section of the bypass from near Campbell Lead Road to the northern river crossing began on July 14, 1964, and was completed on October 22, 1965. The contract for the section extending to the south river crossing was awarded on May 7, 1965, and construction began two months later. This section was completed on July 19, 1967. Work on the Campbell Lead Road overpass and bridge over Ski Mountain Road (then Wiley Oakley Drive) was begun in May 1966 and completed on September 5, 1967. Work on the interchange at the southern terminus of the bypass began in September 1966, and construction of the bridge over the Little Pigeon River at the opposite end began the following month. Both projects were completed in April 1968. The Gatlinburg Bypass was dedicated and opened to traffic on June 15, 1968, by Governor Ellington.

Originally, traffic traveling northbound on the Great Smoky Mountains Parkway was reduced from two to one lane at the northern terminus of the Gatlinburg Bypass, creating a traffic bottleneck; the northbound bypass ramp then merged to become a second lane once again. In August 1993, work began on a project to remove this chokepoint, which consisted of widening the northbound parkway to two continuous lanes through the interchange, and constructing a merge lane for traffic transitioning from the bypass to the northbound parkway. Initially slated for completion on March 31, 1994, the project was repeatedly delayed by geological issues, weather conditions, and equipment problems. Construction was suspended two months later to make way for summer traffic, and resumed in November, with completion slated by the end of the year. One of the 2016 Great Smoky Mountains wildfires reached the bypass, resulting in a temporary closure of the route.

== Junctions list ==
The entire route is in Sevier County.

Location	mi	km	Destinations	Notes
Great Smoky Mountains National Park	0.0	0.0	US 441 (SR 71, SR 73 Scenic, Newfound Gap Road) – Gatlinburg, Cherokee	Partial interchange; southern terminus
Gatlinburg	1.8	2.9	Campbell Lead Road	Access via two-way access road
Gatlinburg	3.6	5.8	US 321 / US 441 (SR 71, SR 73, Great Smoky Mountains Parkway) – Pigeon Forge, Gatlinburg	Interchange; northern terminus; No access from northbound Great Smoky Mountains Parkway
1.000 mi = 1.609 km; 1.000 km = 0.621 mi: Incomplete access

== See also ==
- Blue Ridge Parkway
- Cherohala Skyway
- Foothills Parkway
- Lakeview Drive
- Natchez Trace Parkway
- Ocoee Scenic Byway
