= Gibbs High School (Corryton, Tennessee) =

Location
- 7628 Tazewell Pike; Corryton, Tennessee 37721; United States; 36.12917°N 83.85186°W

Information
- School type: Public
- Established: 1913
- School district: Knox County Schools
- CEEB code: 430465
- NCES School ID: 470222000741
- Principal: Jason Webster
- Teaching staff: 60.00 (on an FTE basis)
- Grades: 9-12
- Enrollment: 1,047 (2023–24)
- Student to teacher ratio: 14.96
- Colors: Columbia blue, black, and white
- Mascot: Eagle
- Website: gibbshs.knoxschools.org

Gibbs High School is a public high school located in Corryton, Tennessee, United States.

The school was founded in 1913 in a two-story brick building built on 12 acres; it burned down in 1937. The second building burned down 13 years later in 1950. The third and current school is near the intersection of Tazewell Pike and East Emory Road.

When the new Gibbs Elementary School opened across Tazewell Pike in 2007, the high school began using the old elementary school building as an on-site career and technical education facility.

Gibbs' principal is Jason Webster.

== Notable alumni ==
- Trevor Bayne, Nascar driver, Daytona 500 winner
- Kenny Chesney, country singer, graduated in 1986
- Ed Hooper, writer and producer, graduated in 1981
- Phil Leadbetter, bluegrass guitarist
- Ashley Monroe, country singer, member of the Pistol Annies
- Morgan Wallen, country music artist
- Dave Wright, politician.
