= Seymour, Tennessee =

Seymour
- CDP
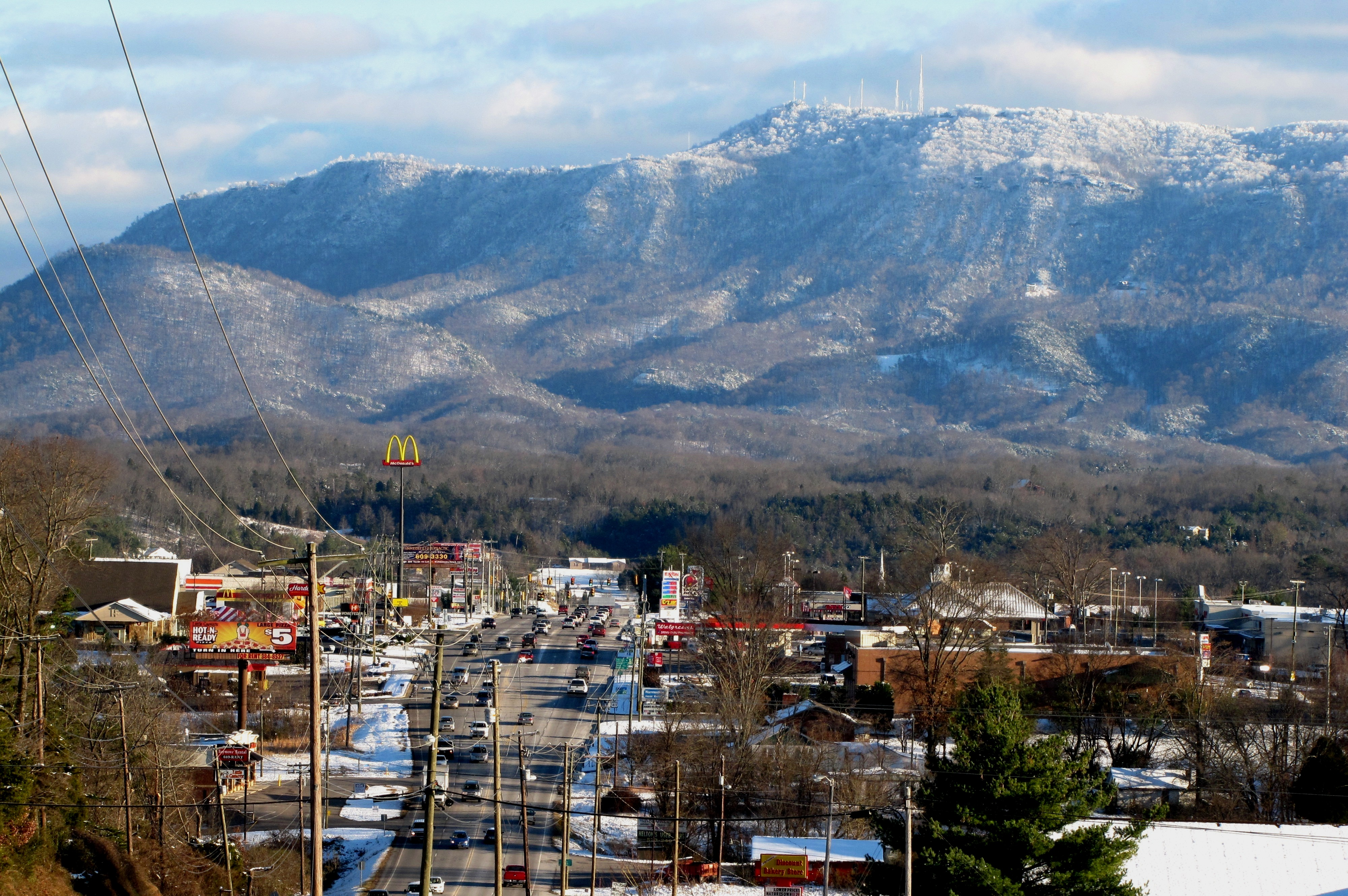
- Seymour, with Chapman Highway on the left and Bluff Mountain in the distance; the towers sit on the summit, 2010
- Motto: "Gorgeous Views, Great People"
- Location of Seymour, Tennessee
- Coordinates: 35°52′42″N 83°46′01″W
- Country: United States
- State: Tennessee
- Counties: Sevier, Blount

Area
  - Total: 16.03 sq mi (41.51 km^{2})
  - Land: 16.02 sq mi (41.49 km^{2})
  - Water: 0.0077 sq mi (0.02 km^{2})
- Elevation: 1,211 ft (369 m)

Population (2020)
  - Total: 14,705
  - Density: 917.9/sq mi (354.42/km^{2})
- Time zone: UTC-5 (Eastern (EST))
  - Summer (DST): UTC-4 (EDT)
- ZIP code: 37865
- Area code: 865
- FIPS code: 47-67200
- GNIS feature ID: 2402842
- Website: seymourtn.org

Seymour is a census-designated place (CDP) and unincorporated community in Blount and Sevier counties in the U.S. state of Tennessee. The CDP population was 14,705 at the 2020 U.S. census. It is part of the Knoxville, Tennessee Metropolitan Statistical Area.

== History ==
Newell's Station plaque

Seymour was originally the site of Newell's Station, a frontier station established by early Sevier County pioneer Samuel Newell (1754–1841) in 1783. The first court of Sevier County, State of Franklin, was held at Newell's Station in March 1785. During the 19th century, the community was known as Trundles Crossroads where the main road from Sevierville forked, with one branch continuing northward to Knoxville and one branch westward to Maryville (now the intersection of Boyds Creek Highway and Old Sevierville Pike).

After the completion of the Knoxville, Sevierville and Eastern Railway on December 18, 1909, the community's station was named Seymour in honor of the line's chief engineer, Charles Seymour. The Trundles Crossroads Post Office changed its name soon afterwards to reflect the community's designation.

=== Unsuccessful attempts to incorporate ===
On multiple occasions, residents have met to discuss the possibility of incorporating as a town or city. The majority of residents have opposed incorporation, arguing it would bring higher taxes and expanded government, while others say that the community would benefit from having a community center, along with sidewalks that might be constructed with the added revenue. Some Blount County residents want their portion of the 37865 zip code to be included within the proposed city limits; however the incorporation meeting was geared primarily toward the Sevier County portion of the community. In the end, the voters overwhelmingly voted to keep Seymour unincorporated.

== Geography ==
Seymour is located in the northwest corner of Sevier County and the northeast corner of Blount County. The community is situated in a rolling valley where the foothills of the Great Smoky Mountains give way to the Ridge-and-Valley Appalachians. Bluff Mountain, the northern terminus of the Chilhowee Mountain ridge, rises prominently to the south while the Bays Mountain ridge passes to the north.

According to the United States Census Bureau, the CDP has a total area of 12.6 square miles (32.7 km^{2}), of which 0.008 square miles (0.02 km^{2}), or 0.07%, is water.

Chapman Highway (part of U.S. Route 441) traverses Seymour, connecting the community with Knoxville to the northwest. Near the center of Seymour, Chapman Highway forms a four-way intersection with U.S. Route 411, which approaches from Maryville to the west, and Boyds Creek Highway (State Route 338), which approaches from Boyds Creek to the east. At the intersection, Chapman Highway merges with US 411 and continues eastward to Sevierville.

== Demographics ==
Historical population
Census	Pop.	Note	%±
2000	8,550		—
2010	10,919		27.7%
2020	14,705		34.7%
U.S. Decennial Census

=== Racial and ethnic composition ===
Seymour CDP, Tennessee – Racial and ethnic composition Note: the US Census treats Hispanic/Latino as an ethnic category. This table excludes Latinos from the racial categories and assigns them to a separate category. Hispanics/Latinos may be of any race.
Race / Ethnicity (NH = Non-Hispanic)	Pop 2000	Pop 2010	Pop 2020	% 2000	% 2010	% 2020
White alone (NH)	8,612	10,477	13,310	97.31%	95.95%	90.51%
Black or African American alone (NH)	32	73	118	0.36%	0.67%	0.80%
Native American or Alaska Native alone (NH)	12	12	43	0.14%	0.11%	0.29%
Asian alone (NH)	41	61	134	0.46%	0.56%	0.91%
Native Hawaiian or Pacific Islander alone (NH)	0	1	2	0.00%	0.01%	0.01%
Other race alone (NH)	3	10	27	0.03%	0.09%	0.18%
Mixed race or Multiracial (NH)	73	97	632	0.82%	0.89%	4.30%
Hispanic or Latino (any race)	77	188	439	0.87%	1.72%	2.99%
Total	8,850	10,919	14,705	100.00%	100.00%	100.00%

=== 2020 census ===
As of the 2020 census, Seymour had a population of 14,705. The median age was 42.9 years. 21.0% of residents were under the age of 18 and 19.7% of residents were 65 years of age or older. For every 100 females there were 94.1 males, and for every 100 females age 18 and over there were 91.1 males age 18 and over.

There were 5,778 households in Seymour, of which 30.2% had children under the age of 18 living in them. Of all households, 57.5% were married-couple households, 13.5% were households with a male householder and no spouse or partner present, and 23.5% were households with a female householder and no spouse or partner present. About 22.6% of all households were made up of individuals and 11.7% had someone living alone who was 65 years of age or older.

There were 6,085 housing units, of which 5.0% were vacant. The homeowner vacancy rate was 0.8% and the rental vacancy rate was 5.8%. 92.8% of residents lived in urban areas, while 7.2% lived in rural areas.

=== 2000 census ===
As of the census of 2000, there were 8,850 people, 3,431 households, and 2,669 families residing in the CDP. The population density was 700.0 inhabitants per square mile (270.3/km^{2}). There were 3,624 housing units at an average density of 286.6 units per square mile (110.7 units/km^{2}). The racial makeup of the CDP was 97.95% White, 0.36% African American, 0.16% Native American, 0.47% Asian, 0.23% from other races, and 0.82% from two or more races. Hispanic or Latino of any race were 0.87% of the population.

There were 3,431 households, out of which 33.5% had children under the age of 18 living with them, 66.2% were married couples living together, 8.9% had a female householder with no husband present, and 22.2% were non-families. 19.0% of all households were made up of individuals, and 6.2% had someone living alone who was aged 65 years or older. The average household size was 2.57 and the average family size was 2.93. In the CDP, the population was spread out, with 24.3% under the age of 18, 7.8% from 18 to 24, 29.5% from 25 to 44, 26.6% from 45 to 64, and 11.8% who were aged 65 years or older. The median age was 38 years. For every 100 females, there were 95.4 males. For every 100 females age 18 and over, there were 91.3 males.

The median income for a household in the CDP was $40,896, and the median income for a family was $45,244. Males had a median income of $30,568 versus $24,611 for females. The per capita income for the CDP was $18,064. About 3.2% of families and 4.2% of the population were below the poverty line, including 3.5% of those under age 18 and 5.7% of those age 65 or over.

The Seymour Chamber of Commerce contends that the CDP does not include the entire area which is identified as the Seymour community. The Chamber estimates the area to have had a population of about 13,500 people in 2000.

== Education ==
Private schools in Seymour:

- The Kings Academy
- Seymour Community Christian School

Public schools in Seymour:

- Sevier County Schools
  - Seymour Primary
  - Seymour Intermediate
  - Seymour Junior High
    - SJHS is a newly created school, contains grade levels 7–9.
  - Seymour High
  - Boyd's Creek Elementary School, contains grade levels K-6
- Blount County Schools
  - Prospect Elementary

== List of people from Seymour ==
- General Bryan P. Fenton
- Judge Ray L. Reagan
