= Newfound Gap =

Mountain pass in the Great Smoky Mountains

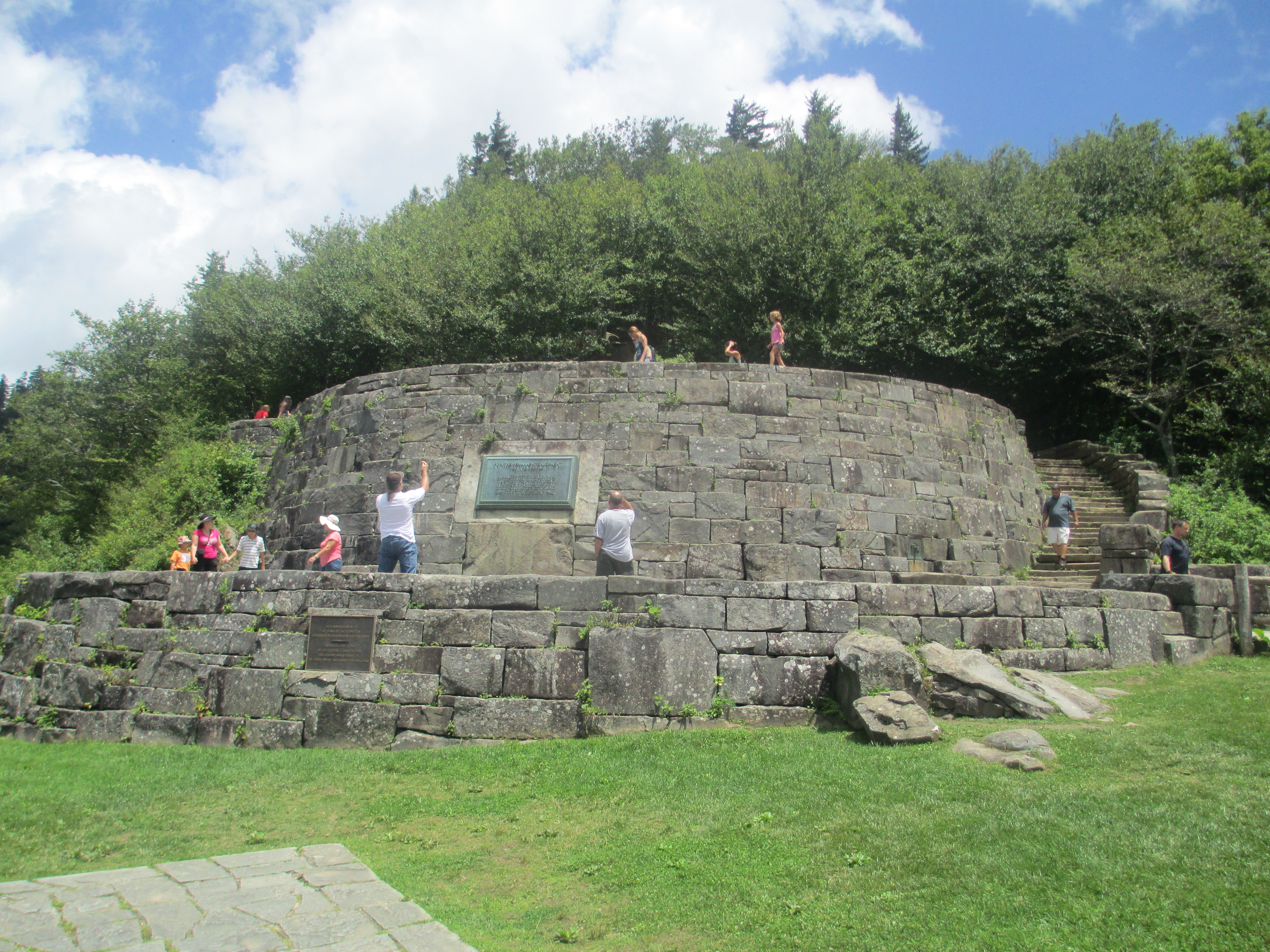
- Rockefeller Memorial at Newfound Gap
- Interactive map of Newfound Gap
- Elevation: 5,048 ft (1,539 m)
- Traversed by: Newfound Gap Road; Appalachian Trail

Location
- Location: North Carolina; Tennessee; United States
- Range: Great Smoky Mountains
- Coordinates: 35°36′40″N 83°25′30″W
- Topo map: USGS Clingmans Dome
Newfound Gap Road
Route information
- Maintained by NPS
- Length: 31.0 mi (49.9 km)
Major junctions
- South end: US 441 in Cherokee
- North end: US 441 in Gatlinburg
Location
- Country: United States
- States: North Carolina, Tennessee
- Counties: Swain, NC; Sevier, TN
Highway system
- Scenic Byways; National; National Forest; BLM; NPS
- Tennessee State Routes; Interstate; US; State
- North Carolina Highway System; Interstate; US; State; Scenic

Newfound Gap (el. 5,048 feet (1,539 m)) is a mountain pass located near the center of the Great Smoky Mountains National Park of the southern Appalachian Mountains in the United States. Situated along the border of Tennessee and North Carolina, the state line crosses the gap, as does Newfound Gap Road (which overlaps U.S. Route 441 through the park and ends at the park's boundaries near Gatlinburg, Tennessee, and Cherokee, North Carolina). The Appalachian Trail also traverses the gap, as do a few other hiking trails.

Newfound Gap is home to the Rockefeller Memorial, a popular destination within the national park and the site from where President Franklin D. Roosevelt formally dedicated the park on September 2, 1940. According to the National Weather Service, Newfound Gap has around 19 snowy days per year. From 1991 to 2005, annual snowfall ranged from 43.5 inches (110 cm) to 106 inches (270 cm).

== History ==
Prior to the development of the Great Smoky Mountains National Park, Newfound Gap was an undiscovered pass two miles east of what was long thought to be the lowest mountain pass over the Great Smoky Mountains, Indian Gap. Indian Gap Road, an unpaved, arduous trail frequented by traders, farmers, and even by the Confederate Army during the American Civil War, was completed in 1839 and named after the old Cherokee Indian trail that the road paralleled. Newfound Gap was not recognized as the lowest gap over the mountains until 1872, when Arnold Guyot measured many of the mountains in the area and determined the "Newfound Gap" to be a lower, more accessible mountain pass.

== Climate ==
Climate data for Newfound Gap, Tennessee, 1991–2020 normals, extremes 1991–present
Month	Jan	Feb	Mar	Apr	May	Jun	Jul	Aug	Sep	Oct	Nov	Dec	Year
Record high °F (°C)	65 (18)	68 (20)	77 (25)	80 (27)	86 (30)	92 (33)	90 (32)	85 (29)	82 (28)	87 (31)	72 (22)	70 (21)	92 (33)
Mean maximum °F (°C)	55.2 (12.9)	57.5 (14.2)	65.8 (18.8)	74.4 (23.6)	77.6 (25.3)	79.5 (26.4)	81.7 (27.6)	79.1 (26.2)	76.3 (24.6)	71.7 (22.1)	63.6 (17.6)	56.7 (13.7)	83.4 (28.6)
Mean daily maximum °F (°C)	39.0 (3.9)	41.9 (5.5)	49.3 (9.6)	58.3 (14.6)	66.0 (18.9)	70.9 (21.6)	73.7 (23.2)	72.3 (22.4)	67.8 (19.9)	59.3 (15.2)	50.2 (10.1)	42.7 (5.9)	57.6 (14.2)
Daily mean °F (°C)	30.6 (−0.8)	33.3 (0.7)	39.4 (4.1)	48.0 (8.9)	56.4 (13.6)	62.4 (16.9)	65.5 (18.6)	64.4 (18.0)	59.6 (15.3)	50.3 (10.2)	41.2 (5.1)	34.7 (1.5)	48.8 (9.3)
Mean daily minimum °F (°C)	22.2 (−5.4)	24.6 (−4.1)	29.6 (−1.3)	37.8 (3.2)	46.8 (8.2)	53.8 (12.1)	57.3 (14.1)	56.5 (13.6)	51.3 (10.7)	41.2 (5.1)	32.3 (0.2)	26.7 (−2.9)	40.0 (4.4)
Mean minimum °F (°C)	−1.8 (−18.8)	4.4 (−15.3)	8.9 (−12.8)	19.4 (−7.0)	31.2 (−0.4)	43.0 (6.1)	48.3 (9.1)	48.0 (8.9)	38.3 (3.5)	24.3 (−4.3)	13.1 (−10.5)	6.7 (−14.1)	−4.5 (−20.3)
Record low °F (°C)	−16 (−27)	−14 (−26)	−6 (−21)	7 (−14)	21 (−6)	35 (2)	36 (2)	41 (5)	25 (−4)	9 (−13)	5 (−15)	−14 (−26)	−16 (−27)
Average precipitation inches (mm)	6.81 (173)	6.04 (153)	6.56 (167)	6.00 (152)	6.19 (157)	6.12 (155)	7.33 (186)	5.07 (129)	5.43 (138)	5.43 (138)	5.87 (149)	7.01 (178)	73.86 (1,876)
Average precipitation days (≥ 0.01 in)	13.5	12.8	13.2	12.2	14.8	15.8	16.9	13.6	11.1	10.3	10.0	12.2	156.4
Source 1: NOAA
Source 2: National Weather Service

== Newfound Gap Road ==
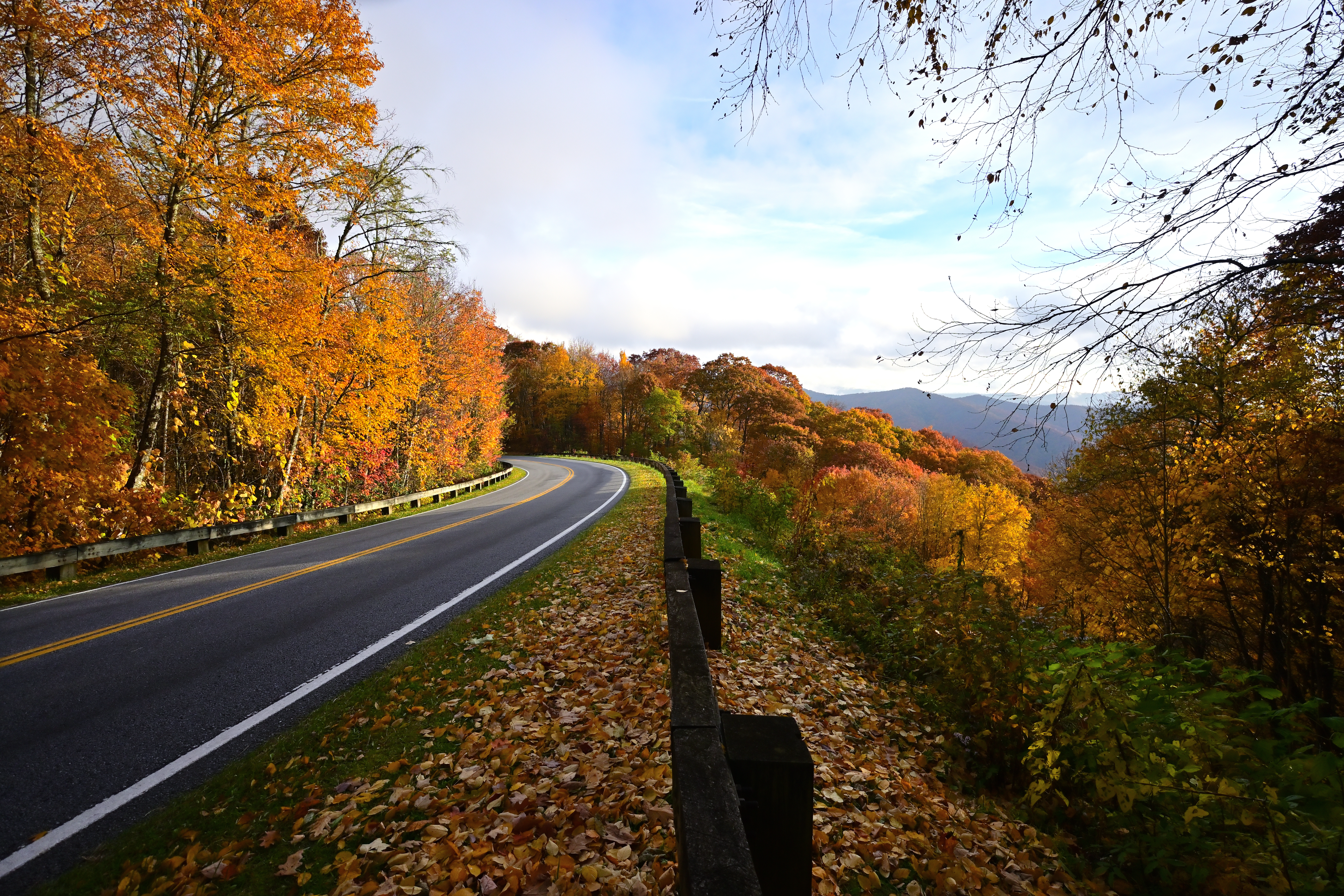
Newfound Gap Road at approximately 4,600 feet (1,400 m) elevation near Thomas Divide Trailhead in North Carolina

With the development of the Great Smoky Mountains National Park came the construction of a highway from Tennessee to North Carolina, completed in 1932—this time crossing Newfound Gap, replacing the defunct Indian Gap Road. North of the park, it is known as Great Smoky Mountains Parkway. The Gatlinburg Bypass, originally intended to be a part of the Foothills Parkway, extends out from the park to connect Newfound Gap Road south of town to the parkway north of town.

Despite its heavy winter snows, the pass is kept open all year, except during and just after winter storms. When closed, the snow route is a long detour around the east-northeast end of the park, using U.S. 321 and Interstate 40. The Tennessee side typically has heavier snow because of its north and northwestern exposure. Even when valley roads are clear and there is little snow in Gatlinburg (and almost none in Cherokee), Newfound Gap may have far deeper snow and will be closed for several hours after significant snowfall ends. Additionally, being in a national park, Newfound Gap Road is only treated by snowplows and a gravel-sand mix, as no chemicals can be used for snow removal due to their harm to the environment.

The road was closed for days after the Great Blizzard of 1993, when five feet (1.5 m) of snow fell, and snowdrifts piled up to twice that.
