= Townsend, Tennessee =

Townsend
- City
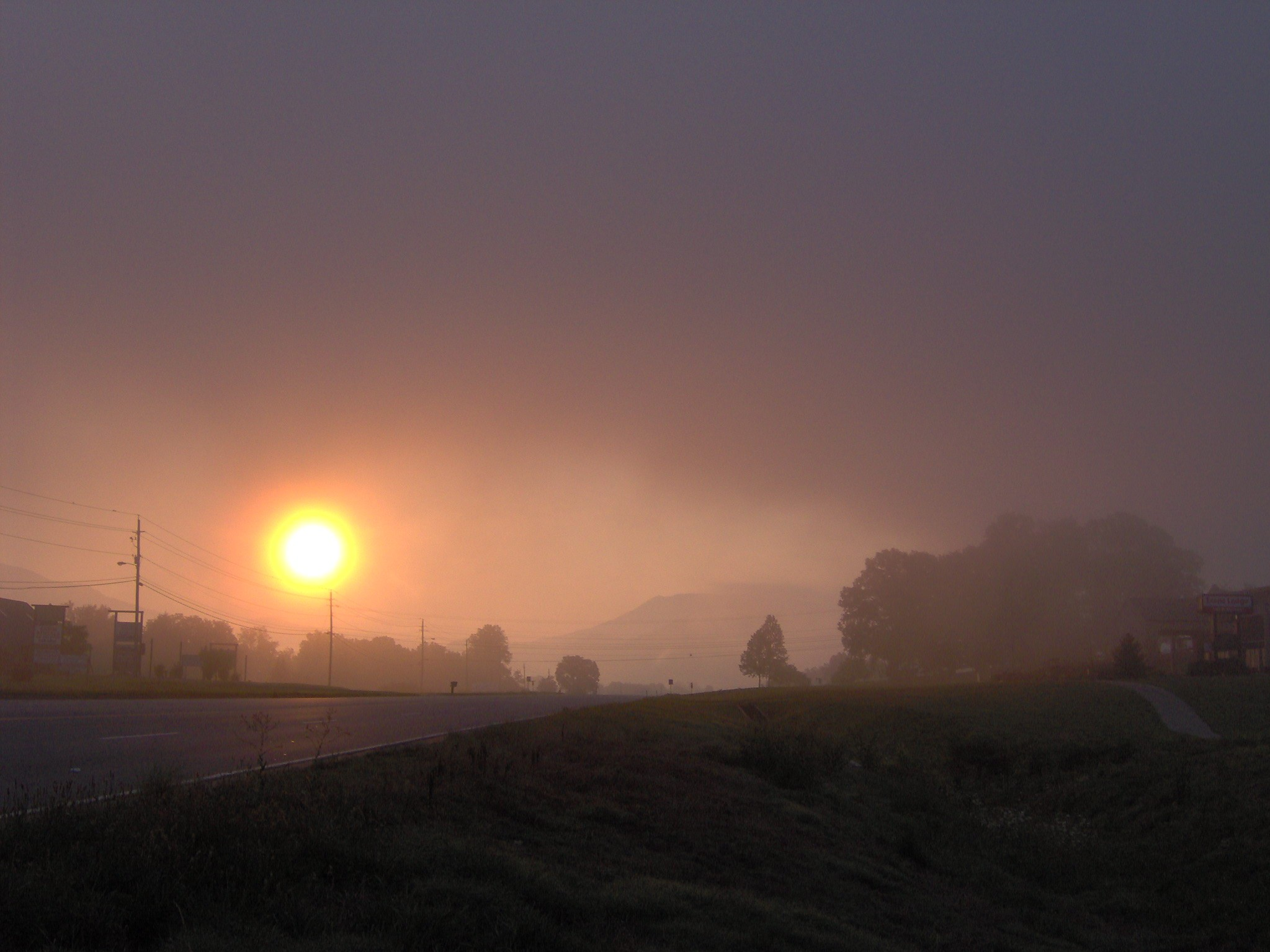
- Townsend at sunrise

- Logo
- Motto: Gateway to Cades Cove & Peaceful Side of the Smokies
- Location of Townsend in Blount County, Tennessee.
- Coordinates: 35°40′35″N 83°45′11″W
- Country: United States
- State: Tennessee
- County: Blount
- Founded: 1901
- Incorporated: 1921
- Named for: Wilson B. Townsend

Area
  - Total: 1.99 sq mi (5.16 km^{2})
  - Land: 1.99 sq mi (5.16 km^{2})
  - Water: 0 sq mi (0.00 km^{2})
- Elevation: 1,076 ft (328 m)

Population (2020)
  - Total: 550
  - Density: 276.0/sq mi (106.57/km^{2})
- Time zone: UTC-5 (Eastern (EST))
  - Summer (DST): UTC-4 (EDT)
- ZIP code: 37882
- Area code: 865
- FIPS code: 47-74860
- GNIS feature ID: 2405597
- Website: www.cityoftownsend.com/wp/

Townsend is a city in Blount County, Tennessee. The city was chartered in 1921 by persons who were involved with the Little River Railroad and Lumber Company. The population was 550 at the 2020 census. For thousands of years a site of Native American occupation by varying cultures, Townsend is one of three "gateways" to the Great Smoky Mountains National Park. It has several museums and attractions relating to the natural and human history of the Great Smokies.

== History ==
Native Americans were the first inhabitants of Tuckaleechee Cove on the Little River; the oldest archaeological finds in the cove date to 2000 B.C. A number of pottery fragments and ax heads dating to the Woodland period have also been found. By 1200 A.D., Tuckaleechee's Native American inhabitants had built a fortified village near the cove's northern entrance.

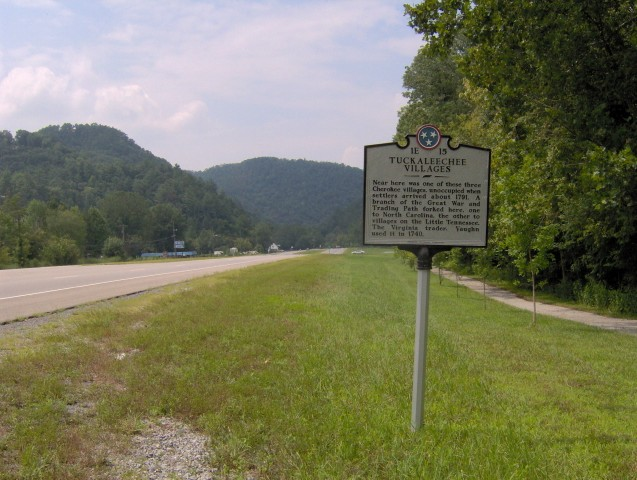
Historical marker in Townsend near the site of the Cherokee villages of Tuckaleechee

The Cherokee arrived in the area around 1600, and built a series of small villages along Little River. The name "Tuckaleechee" is from the Cherokee Tikwalitsi, and its original meaning is unknown. A branch of the Great Indian Warpath forked at this site, with one branch heading west to the Overhill towns along the Little Tennessee River and another heading south to North Carolina. 19th-century anthropologist James Mooney recounted an attempted raid on the Cherokee villages in Tuckaleechee by the Shawano (Shawnee) in the mid-18th century. The raid was thwarted when a Cherokee conjurer named Deadwood Lighter envisioned the position of the Shawano ambush. The Cherokee surprised the raiders from the rear, killing many of them and chasing the rest back over the crest of the Smokies.

By the time the first Euro-American settlers arrived in Tuckaleechee in the late 18th century, the Cherokee had abandoned these villages. They moved south and west to evade encroachment by the colonists.

In 1843, humorist George Washington Harris published an account of a country dance held that year in Tuckaleechee ("Tuck-a-lucky") Cove on the farm of "Capt. Dillon." Moonshine, cornbread, eggs and ham were served, and revelers danced to music provided by a fiddle-and-dulcimer duo. To win dance partners, the men engaged in a display of "feats of strength", while the women quilted.

The exiled Irish patriot and Young Irelander John Mitchel lived and farmed here with his family for some years in the late 1850s. A Tennessee Historical Commission marker dedicated to him is located near the intersection of US 321 and SR 73.

=== Logging industry ===
In the 1880s, the lumber industry experienced a boom, aided by two key innovations – the bandsaw and the logging railroad. Flatland forest resources in the Ohio Valley and along the Mississippi Delta were quickly exhausted by the high demand for wood for fuel for steamboats. Logging firms began turning to the untapped resources of more mountainous areas.

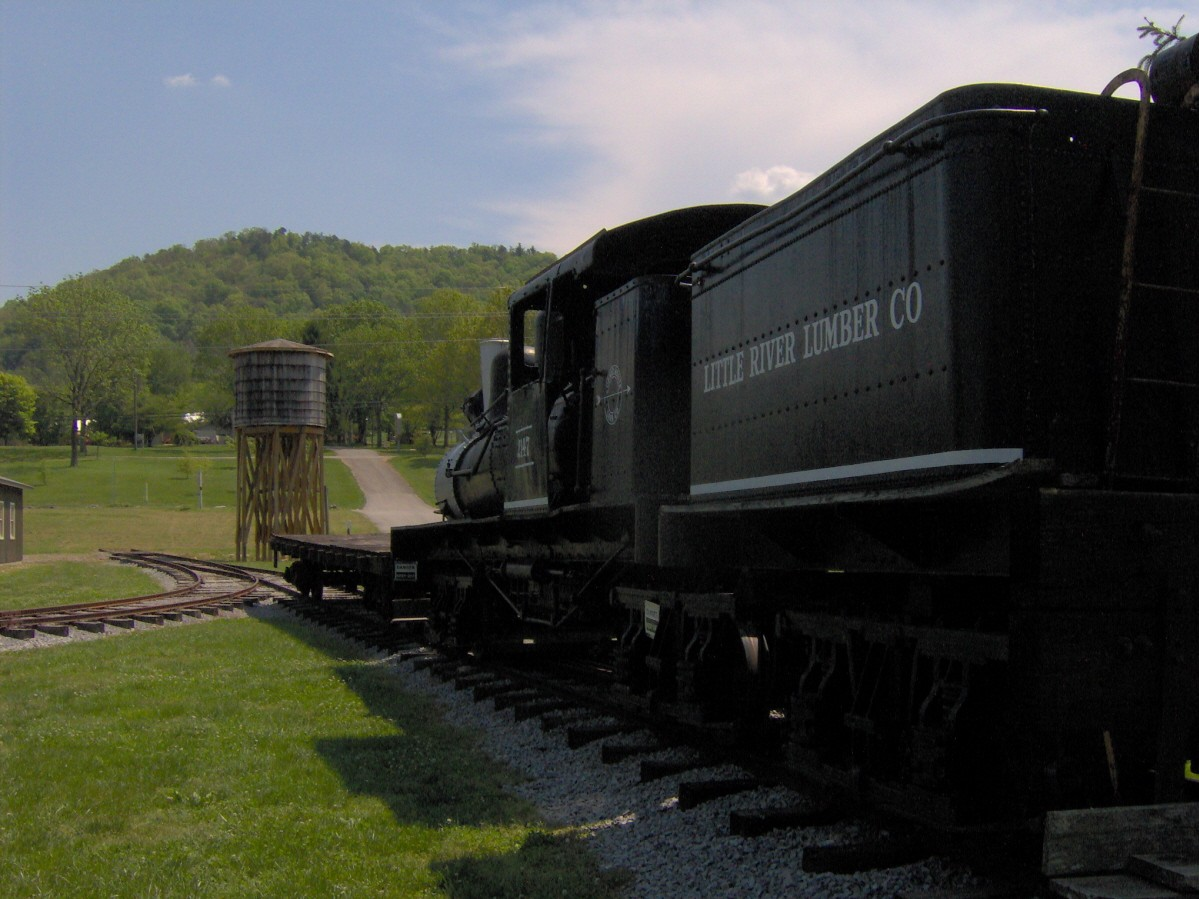
70-ton Shay engine at the Little River Railroad and Lumber Company Museum

In 1900, hoping to capitalize on the near virgin forests of the Smokies, Colonel W.B. Townsend of Lancaster County, Pennsylvania purchased 86,000 acres (350 km^{2}) of land along the Little River, stretching from Tuckaleechee Cove all the way to Kuwohi. The following year, Townsend incorporated the Little River Lumber Company. The community that developed around his bandsaw mill in Tuckaleechee became named after him. Townsend also incorporated the Little River Railroad to both transport the wood products to market, as well as (after about 1909) tourists escaping the summer heat of Knoxville to a resort town he developed in the cleared land, Elkmont. The railroad connected the sawmill with Walland to the west, and followed the Little River upstream to the southeast (Elkmont being about 5 miles from Kuwohi and near the Little River's headwaters).

Townsend quickly profited from the forests of the Little River bottomlands. In 1916, he reported that Little River Lumber's consistently high rate of planks per acre showed no sign of decline. A single giant chestnut tree in the Smokies could yield 18,000 planks of lumber. Townsend's success led to a rapid expansion of logging operations throughout the Smokies. By the time the park was formed in the 1930s, nearly two-thirds of area forests had been cut down, and park managers have worked to restore the forests.

The rapid destruction of the forests of southern Appalachia led to increased efforts by conservationists to slow or halt logging operations. Col. Townsend initially opposed the effort, but after some wavering, sold at base price 76,000 acres (310 km^{2}) of his Little River Lumber tract in 1926 to what would eventually become the Great Smoky Mountains National Park. Townsend lived near Elkmont in a now-historic Swiss-style chalet he called Spindle Top, where he would die in 1936. Although some predicted that the loss of the lumber industry would doom Tuckaleechee, the explosion in tourism as a result of the park's founding contributed to the area economy, keeping it relatively healthy, even though the first resort hotel (Appalachian Club) burned in 1932 (and was restored) and the other, the historic Wonderland Hotel at Elkmont collapsed in 2005 and arson destroyed the remainder (and some historic cottages) in 2017.

== Geography ==
Townsend is located in eastern Blount County. It is situated in Tuckaleechee Cove, one of several "limestone windows" that dot the northern base of the Smokies. These windows form when erosional forces carry away the older rocks (mostly sandstone), exposing the younger rock below (i.e., limestone). Limestone windows are normally flatter than other mountainous valleys, and are typically coated with rich, fertile soil.

Other limestone windows in the area include Cades Cove, Wear Cove, and Jones Cove. Tuckaleechee Cove is situated between Bates Mountain to the north and Rich Mountain to the south, with the cove's greater population estimated at 1,500. The Little River, its source high in the mountains on the north slopes of Kuwohi, slices east-to-west through Tuckaleechee and drains much of the cove. The city of Townsend dominates the eastern half of Tuckaleechee.

According to the United States Census Bureau, the city has a total area of 2.2 square miles (5.6 km^{2}), all land. As of 2004, annexation had considerably increased the size of the town to its current size. Townsend is included in the Knoxville Metropolitan Statistical Area.

=== Climate ===
Climate data for Townsend, Tennessee, 1991–2020 normals, extremes 1999–present
Month	Jan	Feb	Mar	Apr	May	Jun	Jul	Aug	Sep	Oct	Nov	Dec	Year
Record high °F (°C)	75 (24)	79 (26)	83 (28)	88 (31)	87 (31)	96 (36)	99 (37)	99 (37)	95 (35)	89 (32)	80 (27)	75 (24)	99 (37)
Mean maximum °F (°C)	65.6 (18.7)	69.1 (20.6)	77.3 (25.2)	84.4 (29.1)	83.6 (28.7)	87.5 (30.8)	88.1 (31.2)	87.5 (30.8)	85.9 (29.9)	80.1 (26.7)	73.2 (22.9)	69.4 (20.8)	89.9 (32.2)
Mean daily maximum °F (°C)	47.0 (8.3)	50.5 (10.3)	58.8 (14.9)	68.6 (20.3)	73.6 (23.1)	78.9 (26.1)	81.5 (27.5)	80.6 (27.0)	76.8 (24.9)	67.6 (19.8)	58.6 (14.8)	50.3 (10.2)	66.1 (18.9)
Daily mean °F (°C)	36.3 (2.4)	39.6 (4.2)	46.6 (8.1)	55.7 (13.2)	62.4 (16.9)	69.1 (20.6)	72.1 (22.3)	70.9 (21.6)	66.3 (19.1)	55.9 (13.3)	46.1 (7.8)	39.8 (4.3)	55.1 (12.8)
Mean daily minimum °F (°C)	25.6 (−3.6)	28.7 (−1.8)	34.5 (1.4)	42.9 (6.1)	51.2 (10.7)	59.2 (15.1)	62.7 (17.1)	61.3 (16.3)	55.8 (13.2)	44.1 (6.7)	33.7 (0.9)	29.3 (−1.5)	44.1 (6.7)
Mean minimum °F (°C)	8.1 (−13.3)	12.5 (−10.8)	18.7 (−7.4)	28.1 (−2.2)	35.1 (1.7)	49.9 (9.9)	55.6 (13.1)	54.8 (12.7)	44.3 (6.8)	29.3 (−1.5)	20.5 (−6.4)	15.3 (−9.3)	4.9 (−15.1)
Record low °F (°C)	−4 (−20)	−5 (−21)	8 (−13)	19 (−7)	29 (−2)	43 (6)	48 (9)	45 (7)	33 (1)	24 (−4)	12 (−11)	2 (−17)	−5 (−21)
Average precipitation inches (mm)	5.61 (142)	4.91 (125)	5.25 (133)	5.21 (132)	5.06 (129)	5.52 (140)	6.07 (154)	4.41 (112)	4.95 (126)	3.30 (84)	4.39 (112)	5.64 (143)	60.32 (1,532)
Average snowfall inches (cm)	3.2 (8.1)	3.5 (8.9)	0.9 (2.3)	0.2 (0.51)	0.0 (0.0)	0.0 (0.0)	0.0 (0.0)	0.0 (0.0)	0.0 (0.0)	0.0 (0.0)	0.3 (0.76)	1.3 (3.3)	9.4 (24)
Average precipitation days (≥ 0.01 in)	13.6	13.4	14.0	12.5	13.8	14.6	15.8	13.6	10.0	10.4	10.7	14.4	156.8
Average snowy days (≥ 0.1 in)	2.0	2.1	0.7	0.1	0.0	0.0	0.0	0.0	0.0	0.0	0.3	1.2	6.4
Source 1: NOAA
Source 2: National Weather Service (mean maxima/minima 2006–2020)

== Demographics ==
Historical population
Census	Pop.	Note	%±
1930	402		—
1940	378		−6.0%
1950	328		−13.2%
1960	283		−13.7%
1970	267		−5.7%
1980	351		31.5%
1990	329		−6.3%
2000	244		−25.8%
2010	448		83.6%
2020	550		22.8%

=== 2020 census ===
As of the 2020 census, Townsend had a population of 550 residents and a median age of 60.3 years; 14.9% of residents were under the age of 18 and 37.3% were 65 years of age or older. For every 100 females there were 97.1 males, and for every 100 females age 18 and over there were 92.6 males age 18 and over.

There were 266 households in Townsend, of which 24.8% had children under the age of 18 living in them. Of all households, 53.4% were married-couple households, 18.0% were households with a male householder and no spouse or partner present, and 21.4% were households with a female householder and no spouse or partner present. About 26.3% of all households were made up of individuals and 18.0% had someone living alone who was 65 years of age or older.

There were 420 housing units, of which 36.7% were vacant. The homeowner vacancy rate was 3.3% and the rental vacancy rate was 16.4%.

0.0% of residents lived in urban areas, while 100.0% lived in rural areas.

Racial composition as of the 2020 census
Race	Number	Percent
White	518	94.2%
Black or African American	1	0.2%
American Indian and Alaska Native	0	0.0%
Asian	0	0.0%
Native Hawaiian and Other Pacific Islander	0	0.0%
Some other race	8	1.5%
Two or more races	23	4.2%
Hispanic or Latino (of any race)	10	1.8%

=== 2000 census ===
As of the census of 2000, there was a population of 244, with 124 households and 80 families residing in the city. The population density was 265.7 inhabitants per square mile (102.6/km^{2}). There were 217 housing units at an average density of 236.3 per square mile (91.2/km^{2}). The racial makeup of the city was 97.95% White, 1.23% Native American and 0.82% Asian.

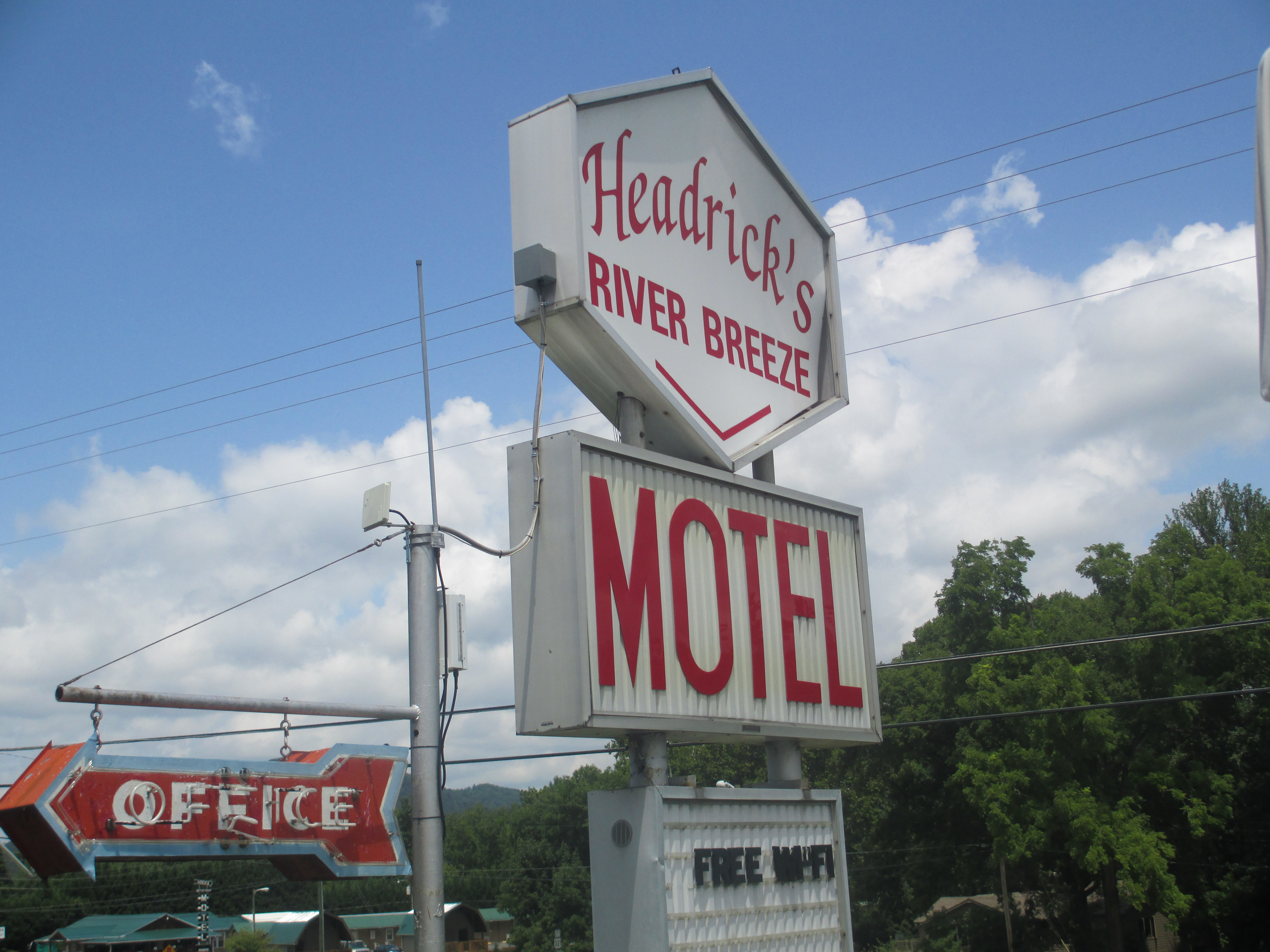
Headrick's River Breeze Motel, which opened in 1979 and remains operational

There were 124 households, out of which 15.3% had children under the age of 18 living with them, 58.9% were married couples living together, 3.2% had a female householder with no husband present, and 34.7% were non-families. 33.1% of all households were made up of individuals, and 23.4% had someone living alone who was 65 years of age or older. The average household size was 1.97 and the average family size was 2.44.

In the city, the population was spread out, with 12.3% under the age of 18, 2.5% from 18 to 24, 19.3% from 25 to 44, 36.5% from 45 to 64, and 29.5% who were 65 years of age or older. The median age was 56 years. For every 100 females, there were 86.3 males. For every 100 females age 18 and over, there were 86.1 males.

The median income for a household in the city was $36,250, and the median income for a family was $50,000. Males had a median income of $41,071 versus $29,375 for females. The per capita income for the city was $21,647. About 5.9% of families and 12.1% of the population were below the poverty line, including 7.7% of those under the age of eighteen and 11.5% of those 65 or over.

== Transportation ==
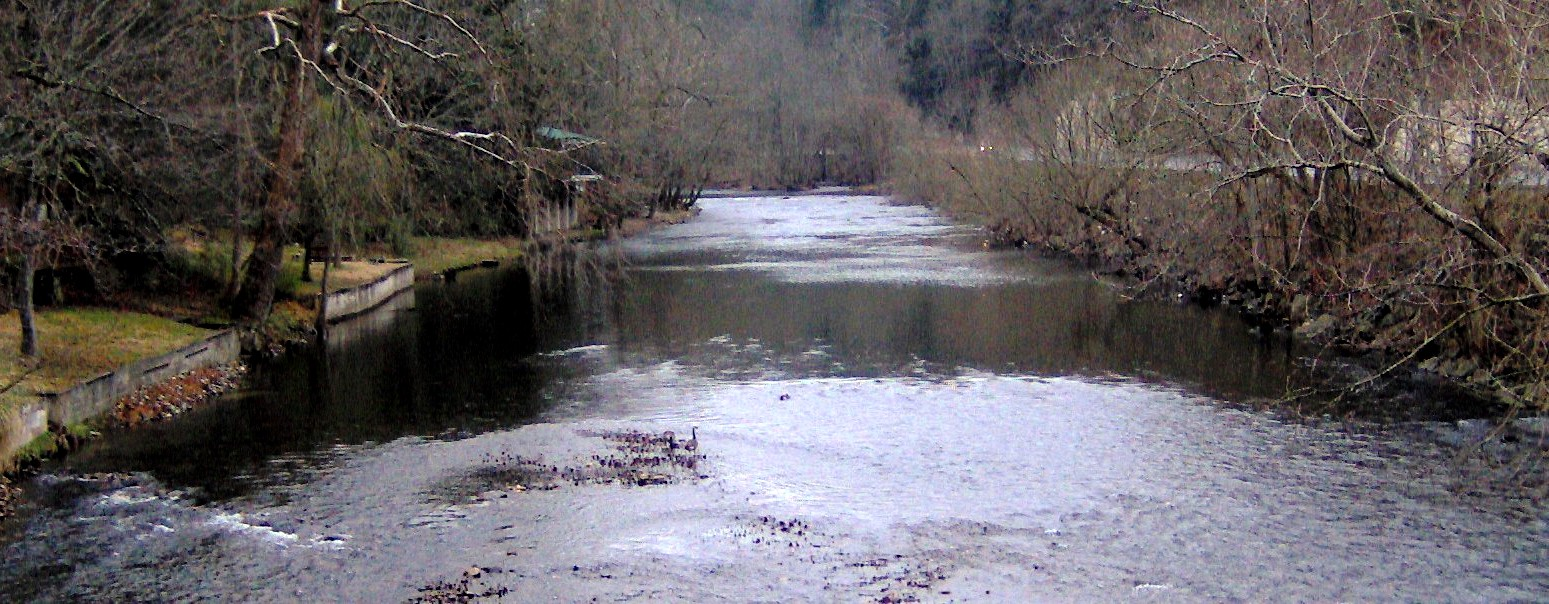
Little River

U.S. 321, also known as Lamar Alexander Parkway and Wears Valley Road, is the main highway connecting Townsend with Walland (and eventually Maryville) to the northwest and Pigeon Forge (via Wears Valley) to the east-northeast, where it intersects U.S. 441. Near the eastern end of Townsend, U.S. 321 tees north and then curves northeast, while Tennessee 73 continues straight and then turns southeast and heads straight into the national park. This road eventually intersects Little River Road at a popular swimming area known as "The Y". From this intersection, Cades Cove is 7 miles (11 km) to the west, and the Sugarlands and Gatlinburg are roughly 18 miles (29 km) to the east.

== Recreation ==
Townsend is home to the Great Smoky Mountains Heritage Center, which preserves various aspects of the region's history, and the Little River Railroad and Lumber Company Museum, which recounts the area's logging history. Next to the heritage center is the new National Park Service Collections Preservation Center, which archives items from all of the national park units in the area (though not open to the public). Tuckaleechee Caverns – a mile-long cave system that reaches depths of up to 150 feet (46 m) – is also nearby.

Just to the north and west of Townsend, the Foothills Parkway is a national parkway that traverses Chilhowee Mountain and offers multiple scenic overlooks at high elevations, with views of the Smokies to the south and the Tennessee Valley and Cumberland Plateau to the north and west. As of 2016, road construction on the parkway to complete the "missing link" from Walland to Wears Valley can be seen from Townsend during the mid-day and afternoon. This section eventually opened in late 2018, more than half a century after the first section opened in 1966.

Townsend is also home to a Kampgrounds of America.

== See also ==
- Christy (TV series)
- Music of East Tennessee
