= Chilhowee Inn =

Inn in Walland, Tennessee, U.S.

Coordinates: 35.7307°N 83.8149°W

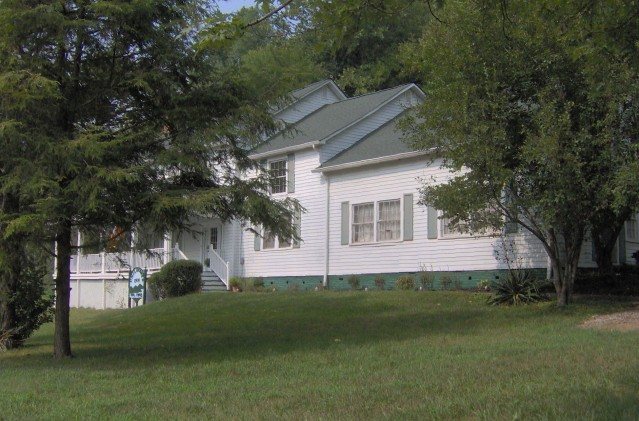
Chilhowee Inn

Chilhowee Inn was an inn built by the Schlosser Leather Company in 1902 in Walland, Tennessee. It was constructed as a five room cottage to house executives visiting the nearby tannery. This was the last stop of the Knoxville and Augusta line of the Southern Railway System, and the starting point for the Little River Railroad. The Inn was named by Mrs. Rachel Fisher, wife of the builder, Mr. A. J. Fisher who was also superintendent of the tannery.

One year after completion, an inn was added to the structure to provide accommodations for additional guests and teachers. The inn was used as a boarding house for teachers at the public school during the school year. The rent was paid for by the tannery.

After the tannery shut down in the early 1930s, the inn became a nationally renowned lodge for people visiting the newly formed Great Smoky Mountains National Park. Excellent service and delicious meals prompted visitors to speak and write of their time spent at Chilhowee Inn. The inn appeared in many national publications of the time.

After its heyday, Chilhowee Inn spent a brief time as a restaurant, serving the local community of Walland. It lay dormant for almost three decades until new owners began to restore it in 2005. Chilhowee Inn opened as a bed and breakfast in February 2008 which makes it the oldest actively operating inn in Blount County.

The building was considered for listing on the National Register of Historic Places as part of a survey of historic properties in Blount County, but because of several remodelings after 1931, it was found ineligible.
