= Wonderland Hotel =

Historic U.S. hotel

- Interactive map of the Wonderland Hotel area

General information
- Type: Hotel
- Location: U.S.
- Coordinates: 35.6629°N 83.5889°W

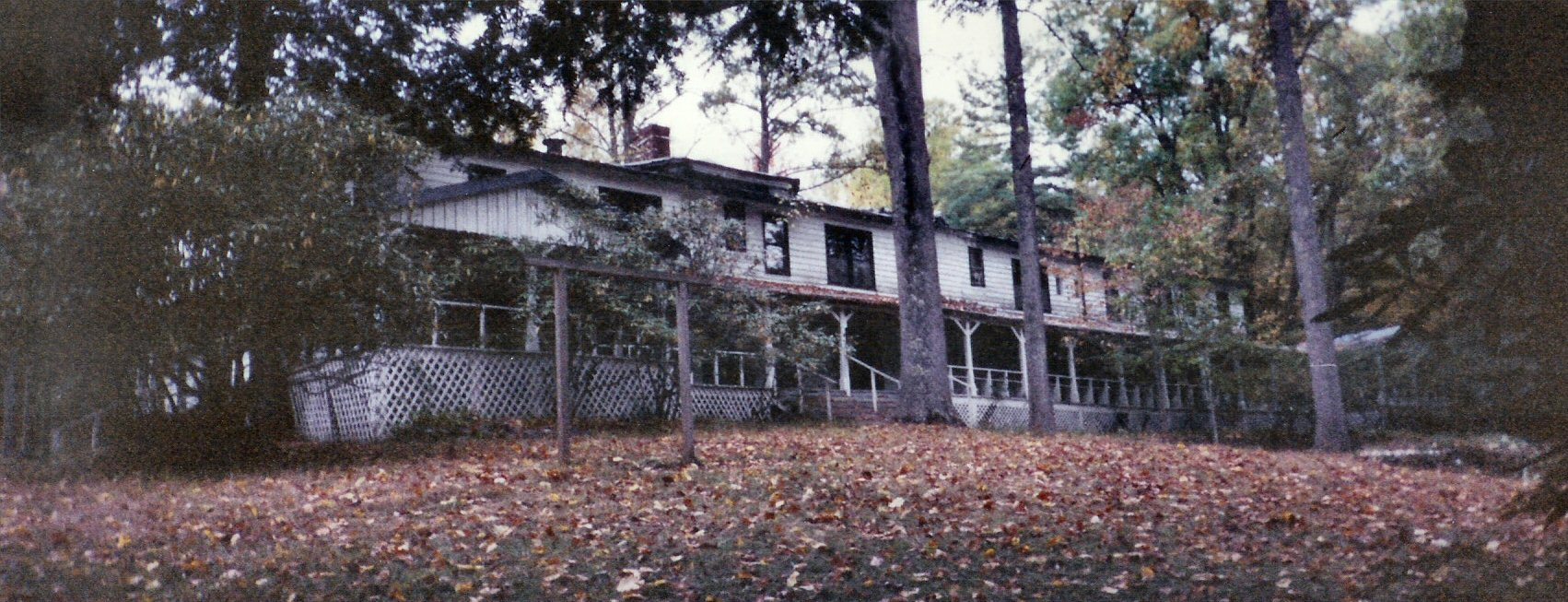
Front view of the Wonderland Hotel in 1993, the year after it closed.

The Wonderland Hotel was a hotel built in 1911 at Elkmont, Sevier County, Tennessee by the Wonderland Club Company and was dismantled and partially preserved in 2005 by the National Park Service. It burned down in early 2016.

== History ==
The Little River Railroad, which owned a number of tracts of land in the area in 1909 built a logging railroad from the town of Walland, Tennessee to the company town of Elkmont. Connecting to a branch line of the Southern Railway, the Little River Railroad Company discovered and began to promote the Elkmont region as a good hunting and fishing area and began transporting men who wanted to visit the area for this purpose. Elkmont was a station on the Little River Railroad Company which provided access to Knoxville via a two-hour train ride until the mid-1920s. As the area was "logged out", Little River Railroad Company President Col. W.B. Townsend was aware of the future benefits of attracting large numbers of tourists to the area. With this in mind, in 1911 he gave Charles B. Carter 50 acres (200,000 m^{2}) of cut over land with the stipulation that he build on the land within one year. Carter formed the Wonderland Club Company and on June 11, 1912, the Wonderland Hotel opened its doors. It would stay open for seven years.

In the seven years that the Wonderland Club was open to the general public, so many men came to the area that the more affluent decided that they wanted their own facility and formed the Appalachian Club. They purchased a large tract of land from the Little River Lumber Company which owned over 76,500 acres (310 km^{2}) in the area between Gatlinburg and Cades Cove in what is today the Great Smoky Mountains National Park. The families built cabins and a clubhouse on the land and commuted via the Little River Railroad to the area during the summer months. This club became so popular that it was soon turning away prospective members. In 1919 a group of these men that could not gain access to the Appalachian Club got together, formed their own Association, and rather than building their own hotel, purchased the Wonderland Hotel and the buildings in its vicinity. The name was changed to The Wonderland Club Hotel. The hotel was owned jointly by members of the new association, and they closed the doors of the hotel to all but the Association members and their guests. About a year later, in 1920, a number of members of the club desired more privacy than the hotel could provide and an annex was built next to the Wonderland hotel on the West side, offering additional guest rooms. This annex remained private up until the hotel closed its doors for the last time under the provisions of the lease with the National Park Service. Some of the rooms in both the hotel and the annex were privately owned but could be rented out when their owners were not in residence.

In 1923 the Wonderland Club and the Appalachian Club instigated the formation of the Great Smoky Mountains Conservation Association. The Association, led by Colonel David Chapman, campaigned for the creation of the Great Smoky Mountains National Park. On May 22, 1926, President Calvin Coolidge signed a bill committing the federal government to administer the land for a national park in the Great Smokies as soon as Tennessee and North Carolina donated 150,000 acres (610 km^{2}) and to begin park development when the states donated 423,000 acres (1,712 km^{2}). The Clubs managed to maintain the 50-acre (200,000 m^{2}) concession of Elkmont by virtue of leases authorized by Congress when the park was formed. The leases were for $1 a year. In exchange for the $1 the Park service provided a water system, sanitation system, road upkeep, police coverage etc.

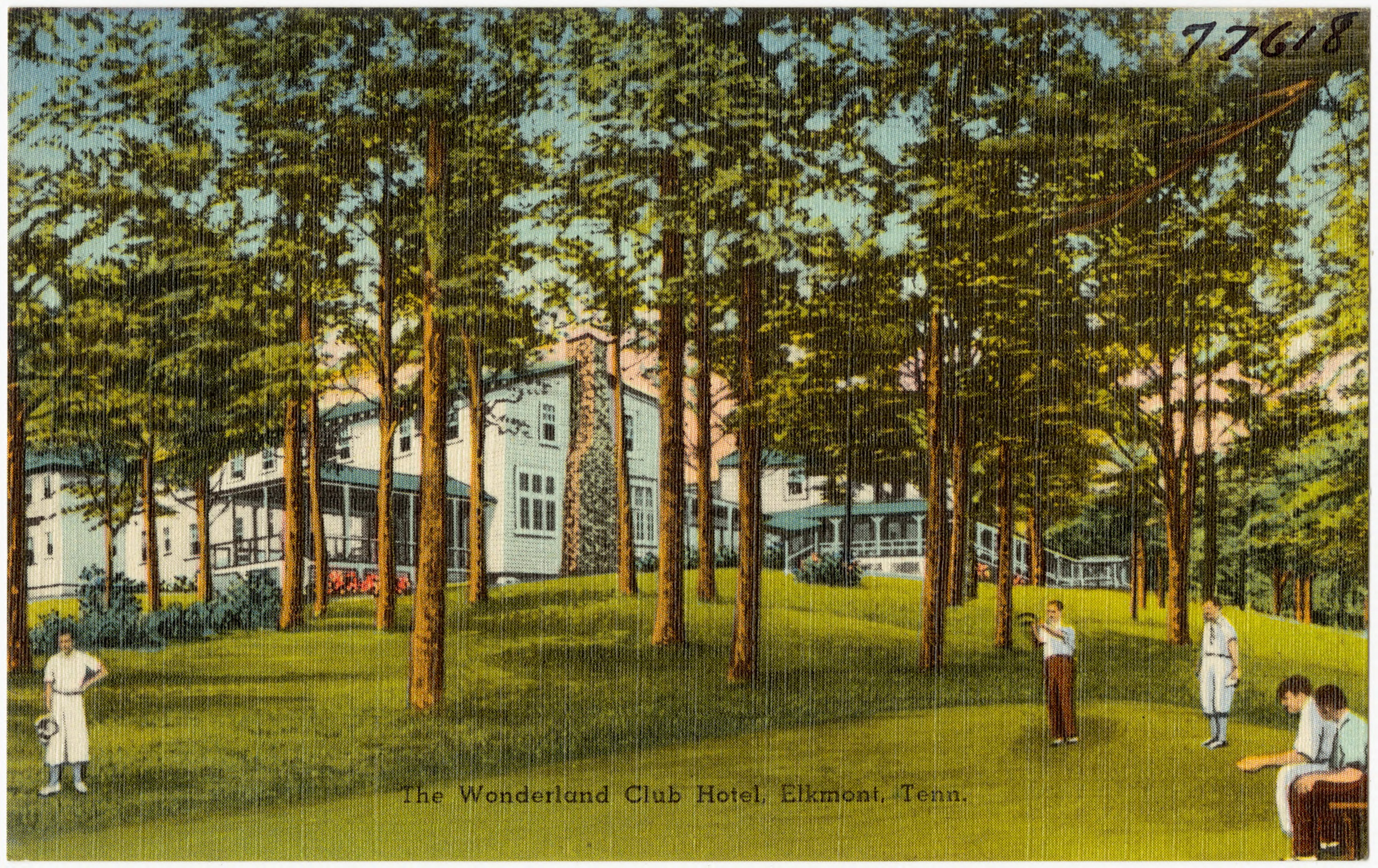
1940s postcard

The railroad tracks were removed secretly in late 1925 when the logging of the area was complete and the Little River Railroad began losing money on the passenger line. The two clubs replaced the rail line with a primitive road along the old rail bed. Today, the rail and road bed constitute TN 73 from Townsend to Elkmont, also known as the Little River Road.

In 1952 the remaining members of the Appalachian Club traded in their lifetime lease for a twenty-year renewable lease. When that lease expired in 1972, the members of the Wonderland Club joined with the Appalachian Club to form the Elkmont Preservation Association which received a new twenty-year lease. Under the terms of that lease, the Elkmont Preservation Association retained the right to operate the Wonderland Hotel, with the right to lease it to a third party.

The Wonderland Hotel lease expired in 1992. On November 15, 1992, the Wonderland Hotel saw its last day of operation. In 1995 the hotel was partially lost to a fire. In 2005, the remnants of the Hotel collapsed, and the National Park Service awarded a $65,419 contract to Moran Construction of Abingdon, Virginia to begin carefully dismantling the remains of the collapsed hotel. The historically significant doors, windows, bathtubs and other artifacts were set aside for permanent preservation in November 2006. These items were placed in park's archival storage area located at the Department of Energy's Office of Scientific and Technical Information Storage facility in Oak Ridge. Keys to the doors of its 26 rooms and a collection of ledger pages and records for the Wonderland Hotel had been previously archived by the National Park Service. In May 2016 the annex suffered a devastating fire, which is still under investigation.

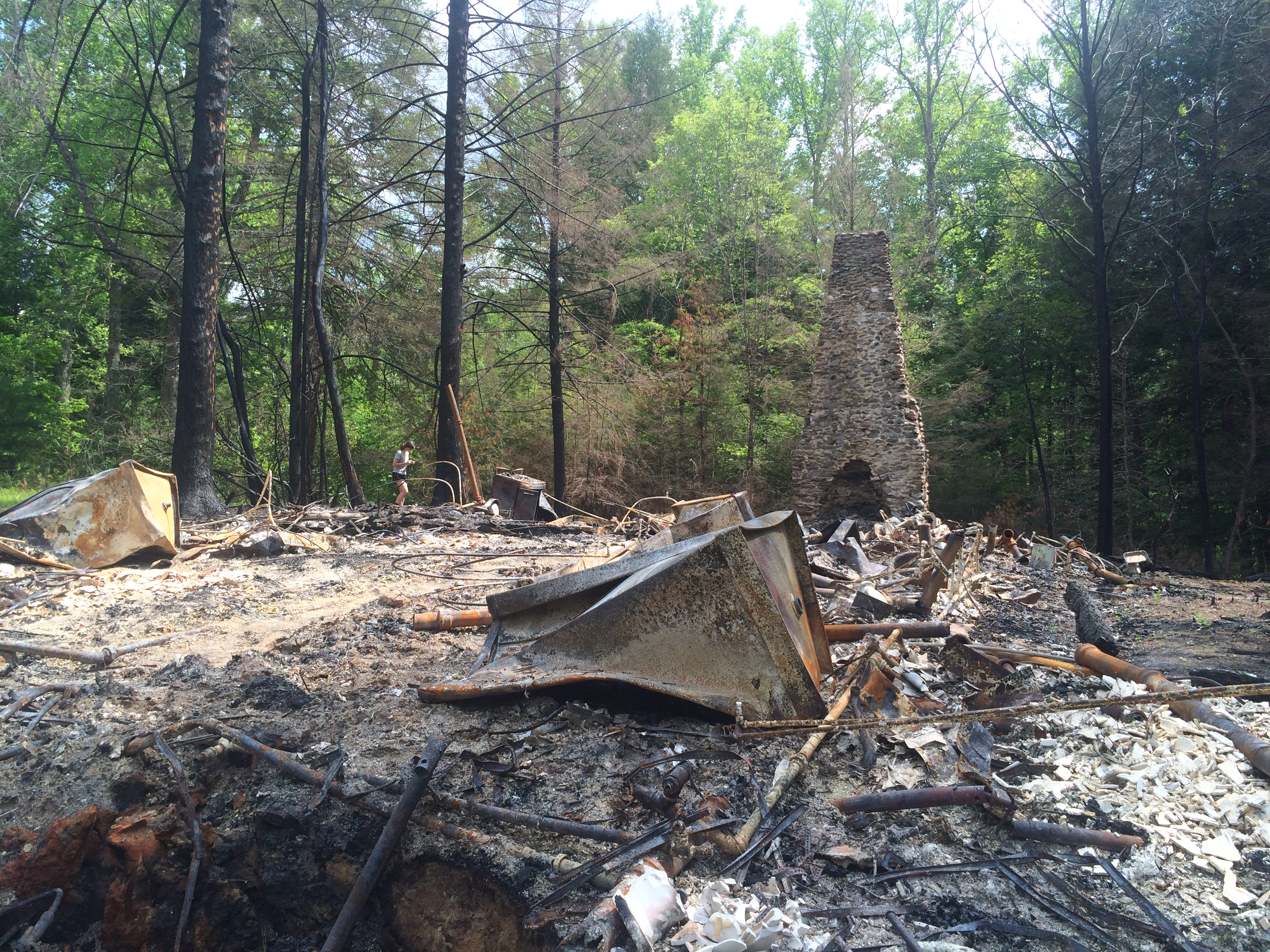

In 2006, the entire Elkmont district including the Wonderland Hotel was placed on the "11 Most Endangered Places" list by the National Trust for Historic Preservation.

== The Main Building ==
The Wonderland Hotel was a two-story wood-frame structure, built from local materials, including large chestnut boards harvested nearby. The steps to the Hotel originally started at the Little River Railroad tracks and went to the top of the hill that the hotel sat upon where river rocks were cemented into the top of the stairs spelling out the word "Wonderland".

=== Guest Rooms ===
The hotel had 26 sleeping rooms, no two of which were the same. Most of the rooms included a private bathroom, many of which included antique claw footed bath tubs.

=== The Porch ===
The Hotel featured a wrap around porch that provided a picturesque view of Blanket Mountain, that was wide enough for numerous swings and white rocking chairs (green in later years) where visitors relaxed. Because the Wonderland provided no phones, radios or TV in the guest rooms, most visitors choose to spend their evenings relaxing either on the porch or in the lobby, meeting and getting to know the other guests. It was a common sight to have Raccoons come up on the porch at night to beg for food from the guests.

=== The Lobby ===
The lobby of the hotel included a large brick double faced fireplace. Comfortable chairs and couches surrounded the fireplace and several wooden chairs and tables were provided for playing games or writing letters or postcards. One of the favorite features of the lobby was a large bulletin board located on the back wall near the rear doors leading to the parking lot on which guests were encouraged to add a photo from their current or previous trips to the hotel. On most Friday and Saturday nights during the operating season special events such as old fashioned sing-along or square dances would be held in the large first floor ballroom next to the Lobby.

=== The Dining Room ===
The hotel's dining room included a split log mantled fireplace. It was known for serving home cooked meals in or near the park. It was decorated in a country style with ruffled curtains, red and white checkerboard tablecloths and split bottomed chairs. After dinner, many guests and visitors moved to the porch for dessert. In the early days of the hotel, meals were included with your room which could be rented by the day, week, month, or 3-month season at a price of seventy-five cents per meal for adults or fifty cents for children. Three meals were offered per day, served family style. A number of the area residents would from time to time provide local wild game meat they would catch themselves to the hotel for meals. This included deer, bear, rabbit, wild turkey, quail, ruffled grouse and rattlesnake. Fresh fish caught from the river was found on the menu quite often.

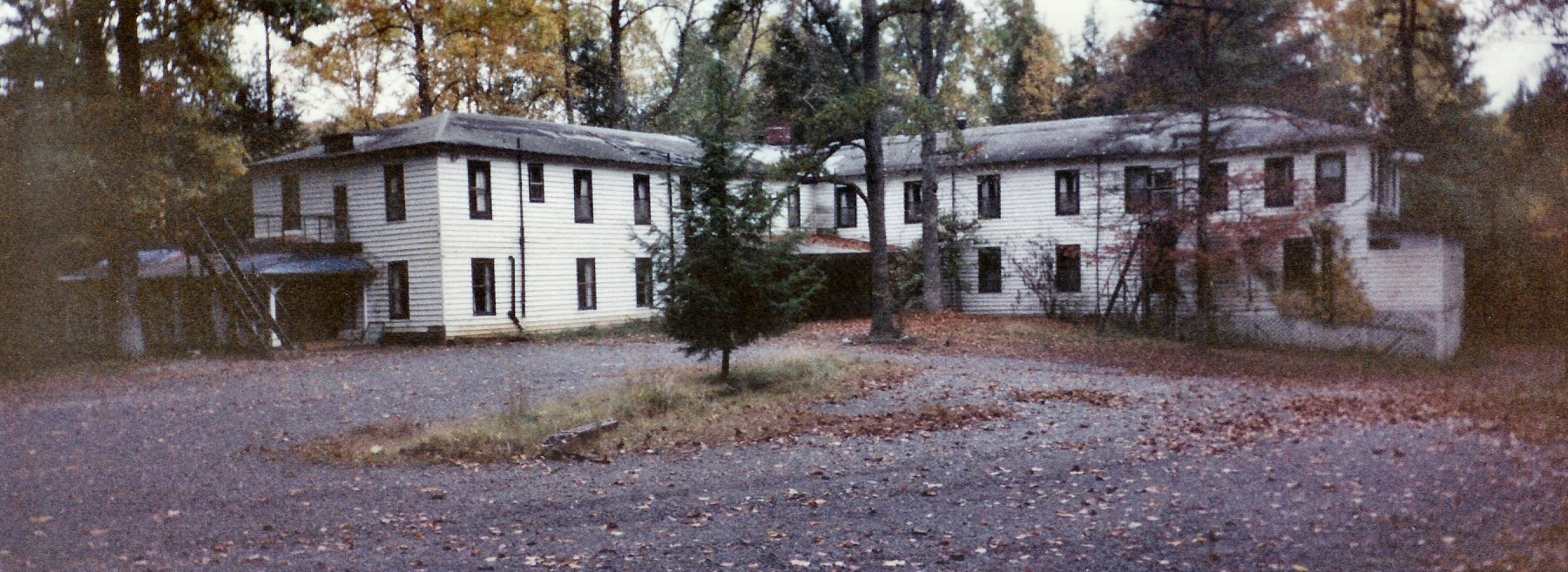
Back view of the Wonderland Hotel in 1993.
