= Little River Railroad (Tennessee) =

Historic U.S. railroad

Coordinates: 35.6775°N 83.7521°W

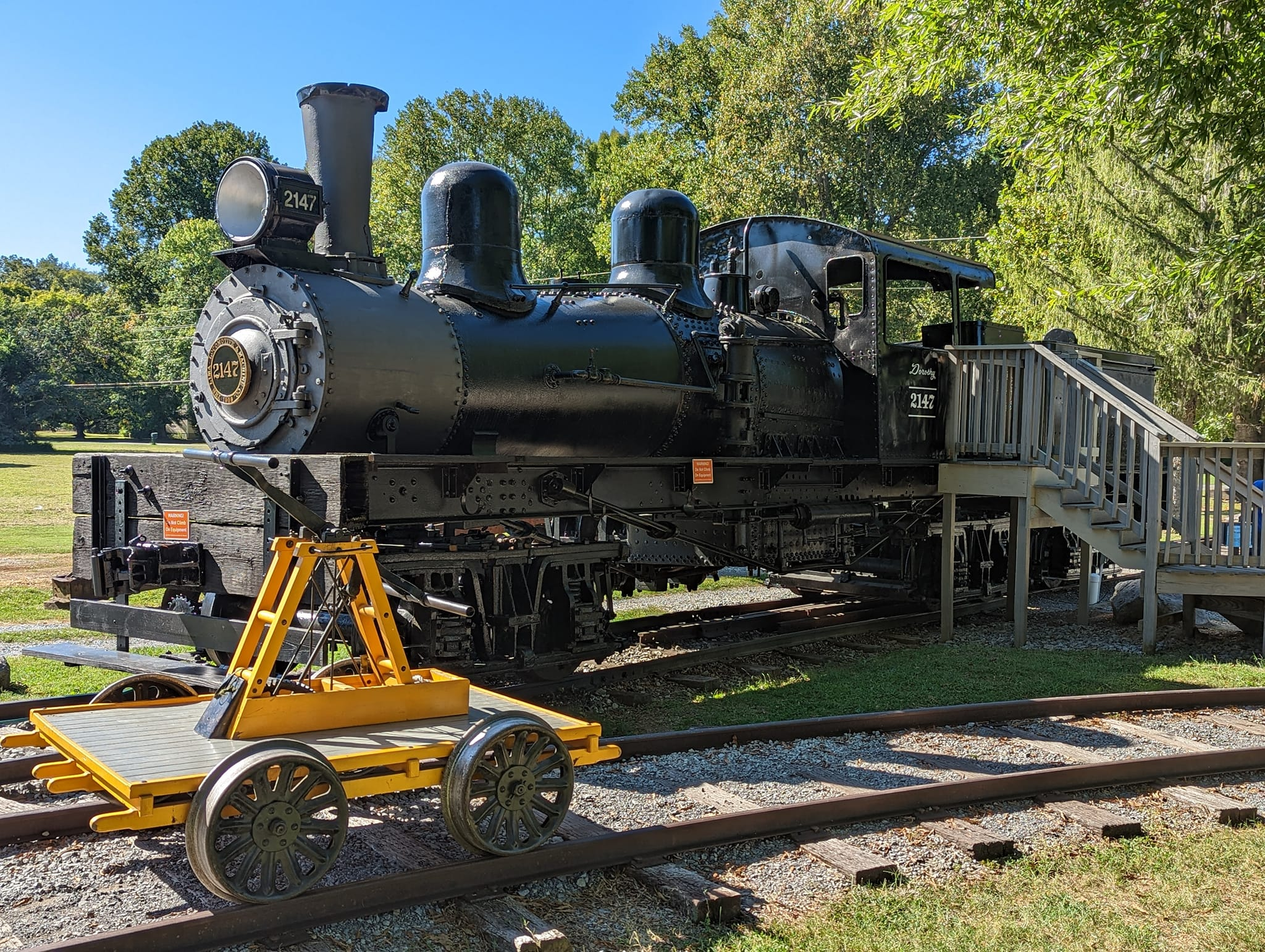
Shay #2147 aka Dorothy with a restored pump car parked on display outside of the Little River Railroad and Lumber Co Museum on Sept 30th 2024. A 70-ton Shay, 2147 was used both for pulling log cars and passenger cars during its run with the Railroad during the 1930s.

The Little River Railroad (reporting mark LRR) is a historic class III railroad that operated officially between Walland, Tennessee and to the confluence of the Little River and the West Prong of the Little River at a location known today as the Townsend Wye.

== History ==
The Little River Railroad ("the LRR") was established as a subsidiary of the Little River Lumber Company ("the LC") on November 21, 1901. Colonel W. B. Townsend was the owner of both entities. The LRR was primarily a logging railroad but also conducted passenger service starting in 1908. The Little River Lumber Company owned over 76,000 acres (31,000 ha) of prime forest land in Blount and Sevier counties. By the time Little River Lumber Company completed operations in 1939, it had harvested two billion board feet (4,700,000 m^{3}) of lumber from the Little River watershed.

The LC typically would build a line into an area, complete the logging, then remove the line. In all, the LC built 150 miles (240 km) of track, none of which remains. The LRR operated several forms of equipment during its lifetime. The primary logging locomotive was the Shay. The LRR also utilized the 4-6-2 Pacific and the first 2-4-4-2 Mallet articulated. In addition, the LRR owned a rail bus, and Townsend utilized a rail car.

In 1925, Townsend agreed to deed all of the holdings of the Little River Lumber Company to the Great Smoky Mountains National Park for $273,557, or $3.58 per acre. This purchase represented a milestone in the eventual creation of the park. The purchase permitted the Little River Lumber Company to continue logging within the park boundaries until 1938. In 1939 the LRR ended operations. Today, the Little River Lumber Co & Railroad Museum in Townsend, Tennessee, preserves the history of the Lumber Company and the Railroad.

== Route ==
The LRR's main line began in Walland at the Walland junction with the Knoxville and Augusta Railroad, whose trackage ran from Knoxville through Maryville to Walland and was later bought by the Southern Railway. Between Walland and Townsend, the railroad had several stops, one at the confluence of Hesse Creek and Little River, the Sunshine/Kinzel Springs stop, and the Riverside stop, which was located across from the present-day site of the Apple Valley Barn. The route of the LRR roughly followed present-day U.S. Route 321 and State Route 73 in close proximity of the river.

Townsend was the site of the Little River Lumber Company's sawmill. After leaving the mill site, the main line continued towards the mountains. The line continued towards the confluence of the Little River and the West Prong of the Little River at a location known as the Townsend Wye, where an additional stop, named Forks, was located. It was here that the LRR's chartered right-of-way officially ended. Beyond this point, the Little River Lumber Company owned the trackage and operated the trains along two branches: the western branch to Tremont, where a small logging community was located, and the eastern branch to Elkmont with an additional stop near Metcalf Bottoms named Line Springs. The area of Elkmont was home to a larger logging community as well as a recreational community.

In 1908, to circumvent oversight by the Interstate Commerce Commission regarding passenger transportation, the Lumber Company established an additional railroad known as the East Prong Railroad. This company had no rolling stock, no facilities, and only a small number of employees when it entered into a contractual agreement with the Lumber Company and the LRR to provide passenger service from Townsend to the various stops in the mountains. By 1909, the Lumber Company began advertising the Elkmont Special, a passenger train service that operated from Knoxville to Elkmont and later served destinations such as the Appalachian Club and the Wonderland Hotel.
