= Elkmont, Tennessee =

- Elkmont Historic District, Great Smoky Mountains National Park
- U.S. National Register of Historic Places
- U.S. Historic district
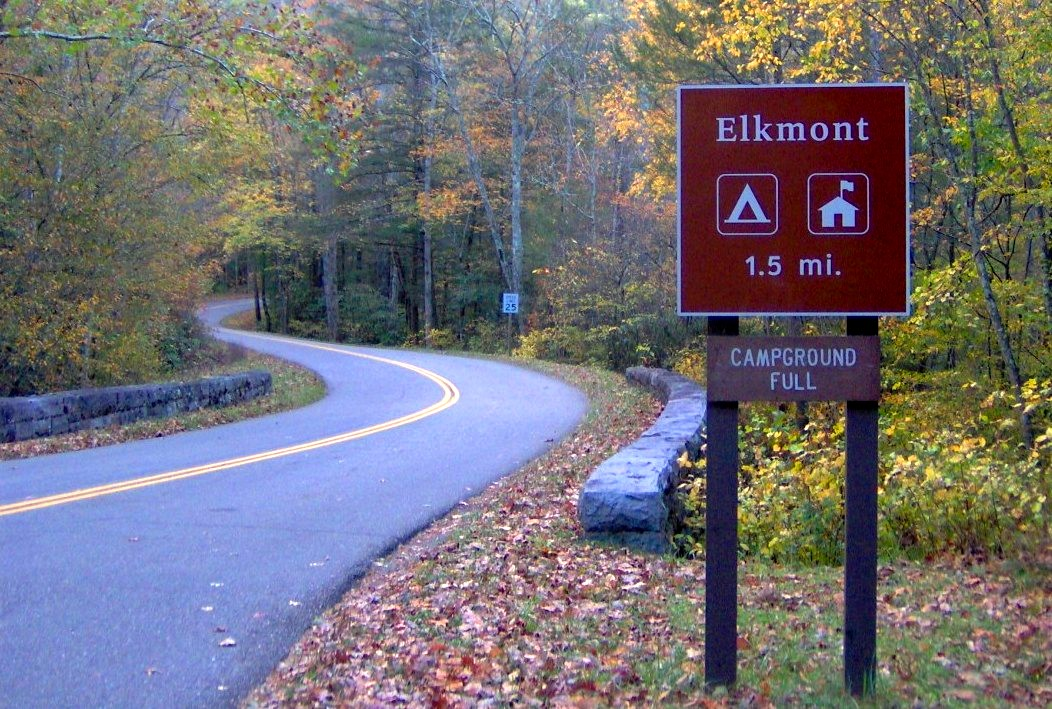
- Elkmont, Tennessee

- Location within Tennessee Location within the United States
- Location: Off TN 73 SW of Gatlinburg
- Nearest city: Gatlinburg, Tennessee
- Coordinates: 35°39′20″N 83°35′4″W
- Architectural style: Late 19th And Early 20th Century American Movements, vacation cabins;hotel
- NRHP reference No.: 94000166
- Added to NRHP: March 22, 1994

Elkmont is a region situated in the upper Little River valley of the Great Smoky Mountains of Sevier County, in the U.S. state of Tennessee. Throughout its history, the valley has been home to a pioneer Appalachian community, a logging town, and a resort community. Today, Elkmont is home to a large campground, ranger station, and historic district maintained by the Great Smoky Mountains National Park.

The Little River Lumber Company established the town of Elkmont in 1908 as a base for its logging operations in the upper Little River and Jakes Creek areas. By 1910, the company began selling plots of land to hunting and fishing enthusiasts from Knoxville, who established the "Appalachian Club" just south of the logging town. In 1912, a resort hotel, the Wonderland Park Hotel, was constructed on a hill overlooking Elkmont. A group of Knoxville businessmen purchased the Wonderland in 1919 and established the "Wonderland Club." Over the next two decades, the Appalachian Club and Wonderland Club evolved into elite vacation areas where East Tennessee's wealthy could gather and socialize.

Upon the creation of the national park in the 1930s, most of Elkmont's cottage owners were given lifetime leases. These were converted to 20-year leases in 1952 and renewed in 1972. The National Park Service did not renew the leases in 1992, and under the park's general management plan, the hotel and cottages were to be removed. In 1994, however, the Wonderland Hotel and several dozen of the Elkmont cottages were listed on the National Register of Historic Places as Elkmont Historic District, Great Smoky Mountains National Park, sparking a 15-year debate over the fate of the historic structures. In 2009, the National Park Service announced plans to restore the Appalachian Clubhouse and 18 cottages and outbuildings in the Appalachian Club area (which were older and more historically significant) and remove all other structures, including the Wonderland Annex (the main hotel had collapsed in 2005).

== Geography ==
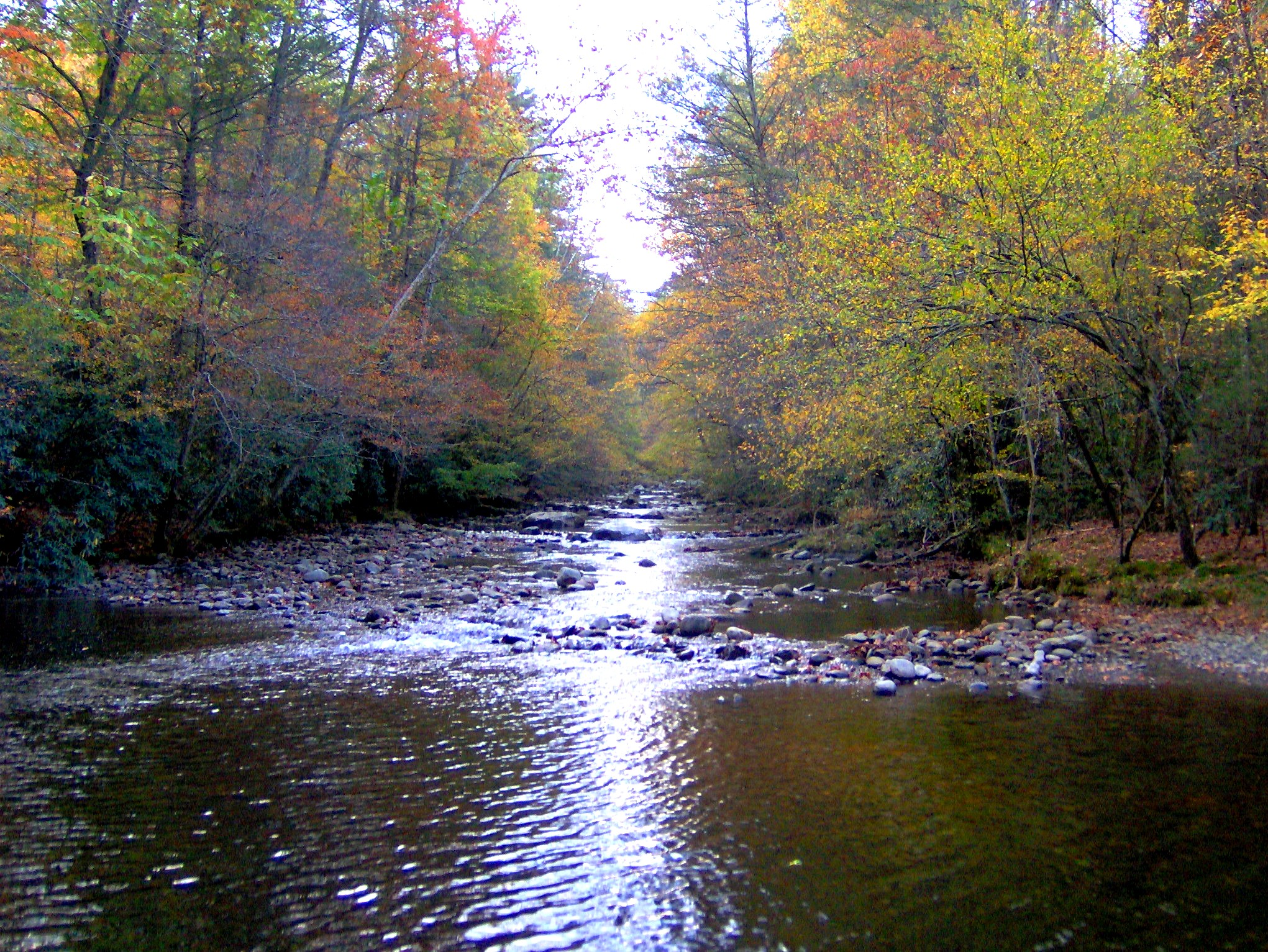
Little River in Elkmont

Elkmont is situated in a narrow but relatively flat valley created by the junction of Little River and Jakes Creek. Steep ridges surround the valley on all sides, with Meigs Mountain rising to the west, Sugarland Mountain rising to the east, and Cove Mountain rising to the north. To the south is Blanket Mountain, with the slopes of Kuwohi and Mount Collins beyond.

The source of Little River is approximately five miles above Elkmont along the slopes of Kuwohi, where it begins as a small trickle before its confluence with several smaller streams at an area known as Three Forks. In just over a mile, the river gains strength as it absorbs Meigs Post Prong, Rough Creek, and Fish Camp Prong before its junction with Jakes Creek at Elkmont. Just beyond Elkmont, the river turns sharply to the west toward its junction with Middle Prong at a popular swimming area known as the "Y".

Historically, Elkmont has been divided into three sections. The Wonderland Club section—the former location of the Wonderland Hotel and associated cottages—crowns a hill in the northeastern part of Elkmont. The section containing the Elkmont campground and ranger station—which was once home to the Little River Lumber Company logging town—is located at the center of Elkmont, north of the confluence of Little River and Jakes Creek. The Appalachian Club section is located primarily in the southern part of Elkmont, south of the confluence of Little River and Jakes Creek. The Appalachian Club section is divided into three smaller sections—"Daisy Town" between the mouths of Jakes Creek and Bearwallow Branch, "Society Hill" further south along the banks of Jakes Creek, and "Millionaires' Row" further east along the banks of Little River.

== History ==
=== Early pioneers ===
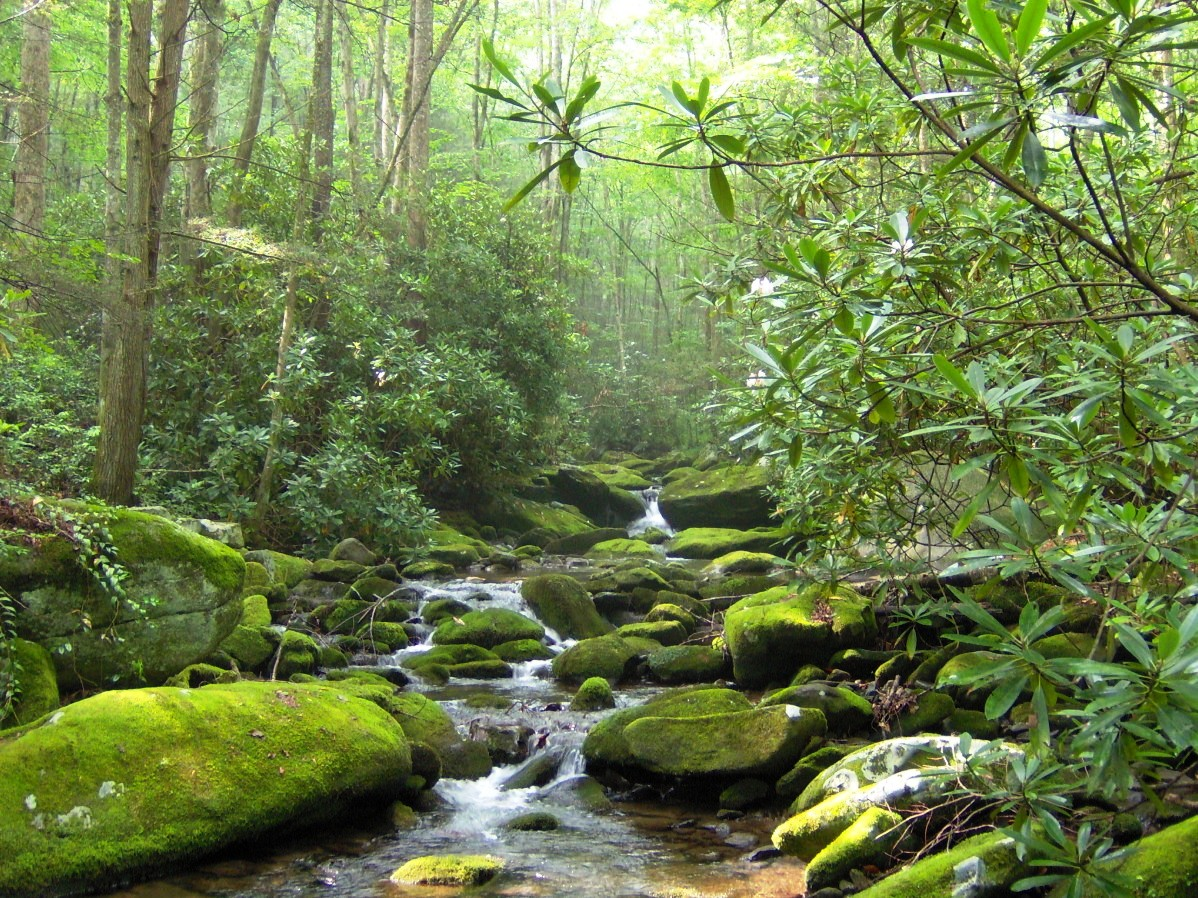
Jakes Creek

The area known as Elkmont was initially inhabited by Native Americans. The first known permanent European inhabitants resided along Jakes Creek in the 1840s. The creek's namesake, Jacob Hauser (c. 1791–1870), was probably the first to arrive. He was followed shortly thereafter by the family of David Ownby (1816–1889), who came to the area to search for gold. The small community that developed in the valley was known simply as "Little River". Like most Appalachian communities, the residents of Little River developed a subsistence agricultural economy. Most residents grew corn and apples and kept bees for honey. Several gristmills arose along Jakes Creek.

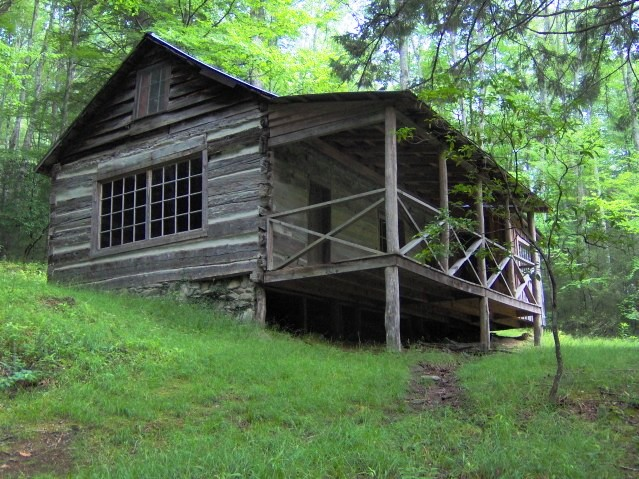
The Avent Cabin

Only two structures remain from the pioneer period in Elkmont: the Avent cabin (constructed c. 1850) and the Levi Trentham cabin (constructed c. 1830). Originally built by the Ownby family, the Avent cabin was sold in 1918 to the family of noted Nashville artist Mayna Avent, who used it as an art studio until 1940. The Levi Trentham cabin was originally located in the upper reaches of Jakes Creek and was moved to the Appalachian Club's Daisy Town section in 1932 for use as a guest house.

Lem Ownby, David Ownby's grandson, was born near Jakes Creek in 1889. In 1908, Ownby and his father built a cabin about a mile or so above the confluence of Jakes Creek and Little River where Ownby lived for the rest of his life. Ownby obtained a lifetime lease when the national park was established, and for several decades afterward he sold honey to hikers. Among those who paid Ownby a visit were Tennessee Governor Lamar Alexander and U.S. Supreme Court Justices Harry Blackmun and Potter Stewart. The justices were visiting a prominent Knoxville lawyer, Foster Arnett, who wanted to introduce them to a real mountain man. Foster led the two justices up the trail to meet Lem only to discover Lem would not meet with the two men. When Foster knocked on Lem's door and announced that he had two Supreme Court Justices outside who wanted to meet him, Lem simply replied that they were not welcome to come in the cabin. The justices loved that Lem had refused to meet them because he was the one person who would tell them no, something they seldom found. Reportedly the story was one shared for years among the justices on the Supreme Court. Ownby died in 1984, the last of the park's lifetime lessees outside of Cades Cove.

=== Logging era ===
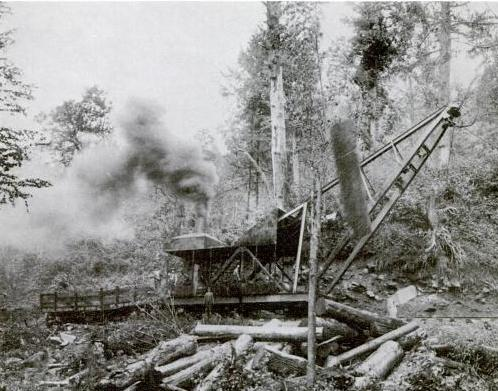
Steam-powered skidder moving logs near Elkmont in 1913

In the 1880s, Knoxville businessman John L. English began a small-scale logging project along Jakes Creek. To transport the logs to a sawmill on the outskirts of Knoxville, English constructed a series of splash dams along Little River. When the logs were ready to be moved, the floodgates of these dams were opened, and the rushing torrent carried the logs downstream. While English managed a moderate profit, his venture had folded by 1900, possibly because of a disastrous flood along Little River in 1899.

In 1901, Pennsylvania entrepreneur Colonel Wilson B. Townsend purchased 86,000 acres (348 km^{2}) of land along Little River and established the Little River Lumber Company. Townsend set up a band saw mill in Tuckaleechee Cove, laying the foundation for the town that would later bear his name. Rather than splash dams, which are at the mercy of the volatile mountain streams, Townsend constructed a logging railroad between the company's sawmill in Tuckaleechee and the river's upper reaches, all the way to the Three Forks area (where the river absorbs Fish Camp Prong and Rough Creek). The railroad was later extended to Walland, connecting it to Maryville and Knoxville. The railroad employed 10 Shay engines to move the log-filled flatcars along the river valley. Logging skidders were used to pull trees from the steeper slopes. Elkmont was established in 1908 as a transfer station where logs were moved from gear-operated trains (used for reaching higher elevations) to rod-operated trains for transport to the sawmill at Townsend.

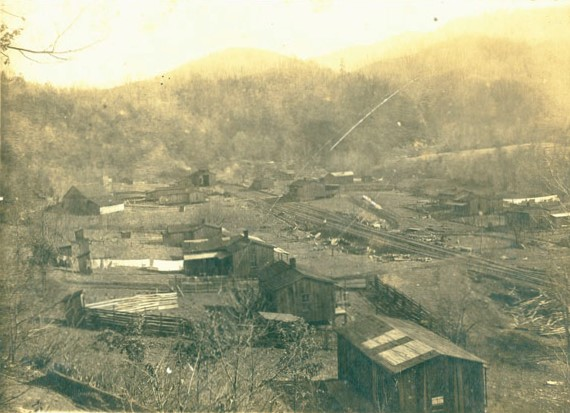
Elkmont in 1915

Early Elkmont was a typical temporary logging camp. These camps bore a resemblance to later Depression-era shanty towns. Shanty houses (or "set off" houses), a post office, a transient hotel, a commissary, and sheds critical to railroad maintenance were the town's only buildings. Many loggers lived in boarding houses, and some crossed Sugarland Mountain via a trail connecting Elkmont to the Sugarlands. As logging operations progressed, it became necessary to move the camp higher up the mountain slopes to the south. The company managed this by loading the shanties onto railroad flatcars and moving them to pre-constructed foundations using a logging crane. Although the logging camps moved, Elkmont remained the company's primary base of operations in the upper Little River valley.

In 1926, Townsend sold most of his Little River Lumber tract to the newly created Great Smoky Mountains Park Commission, although he had been given permission to continue logging for most of the next decade. By the time the company ceased operations in 1939, it had produced 750 million board feet (1.8 million m^{3}) of lumber. In the 1960s, the park service built the current campground over the site of the former logging town. Little remains from Elkmont's logging period, although three of the later resort cottages (including the Addicks and Mayo cabins) are believed to have been modified Little River Lumber Company shanty houses.

=== Resort town ===
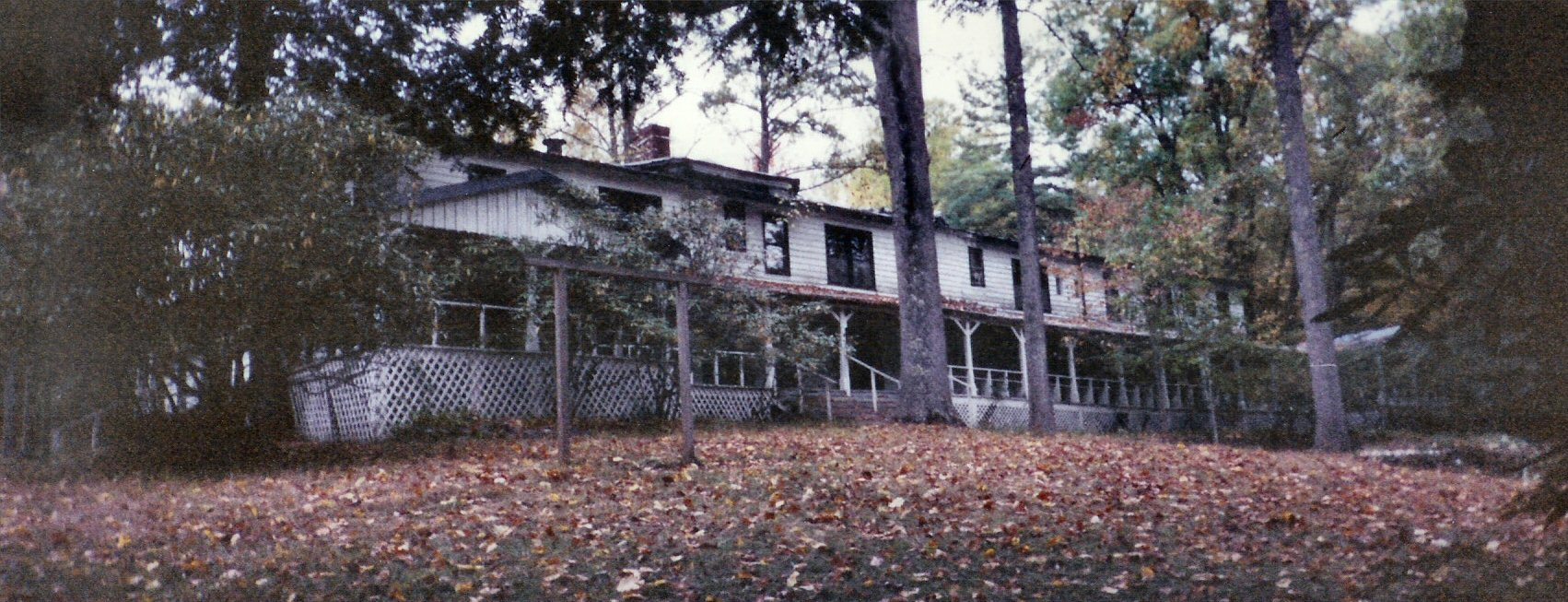
The Wonderland Hotel in 1993

In his company's early days, Townsend allowed hunters and fishermen to use the Little River Railroad to access the deep, game-rich forests of the Smokies. As the Elkmont valley was slowly stripped of its valuable timber, Townsend began to advertise the area as a mountain getaway. In 1909, Little River Railroad began offering the Sunday "Elkmont Special"—non-stop train service from Knoxville to Elkmont. In 1910, an affluent group of Knoxville hunting and fishing enthusiasts formed the Appalachian Club and purchased what is now "Daisy Town" south of the confluence of Little River and Jakes Creek. They built the Appalachian Clubhouse for use as a lodge. Within a few years, several club members built cottages, and the club evolved into a mountain getaway for Knoxville's elite.

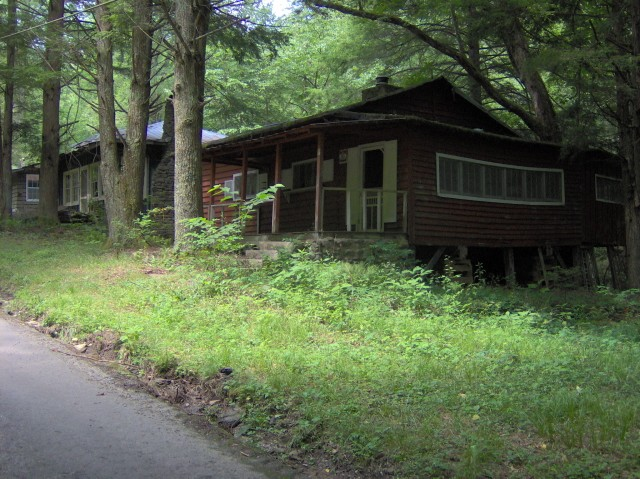
Rustic cottages (now in disrepair) in the Appalachian Club section known as "Society Hill"

In 1911, Townsend gave Charles Carter several acres of land on a hill overlooking Elkmont with the stipulation that Carter build on it within one year. In 1912, Carter made good on the promise when he opened the Wonderland Hotel. Billed as a resort lodge, the hotel contained 50 rooms with an extensive balcony looking out over the valley and Meigs Mountain. As membership in the Appalachian Club proved remarkably difficult to obtain, several rejected Knoxvillians purchased the Wonderland Hotel site and formed the Wonderland Club in 1919. Along with the hotel, 10 or so cottages were erected on the hill.

In 1925, Little River Lumber Company concluded its logging operations in the Three Forks area and sought to move the Elkmont tracks to the recently acquired Walker Valley (now Tremont). Fearing a lawsuit from cottage owners, Townsend ordered the tracks to be pulled up and moved in secret. Elkmont residents were outraged. Fortunately, however, the railroad grades were perfect for road construction. In 1926, thanks largely to Tennessee Governor Austin Peay (who owned a cottage at Elkmont), a road was constructed connecting Townsend with both the Wonderland Club and Appalachian Club areas. During its construction, members of the Metcalf family, who owned a farm just west of Elkmont, supplied the workers with drinking water. In appreciation, a large picnic area between Elkmont and Wears Valley was named Metcalf Bottoms.

=== National park movement ===
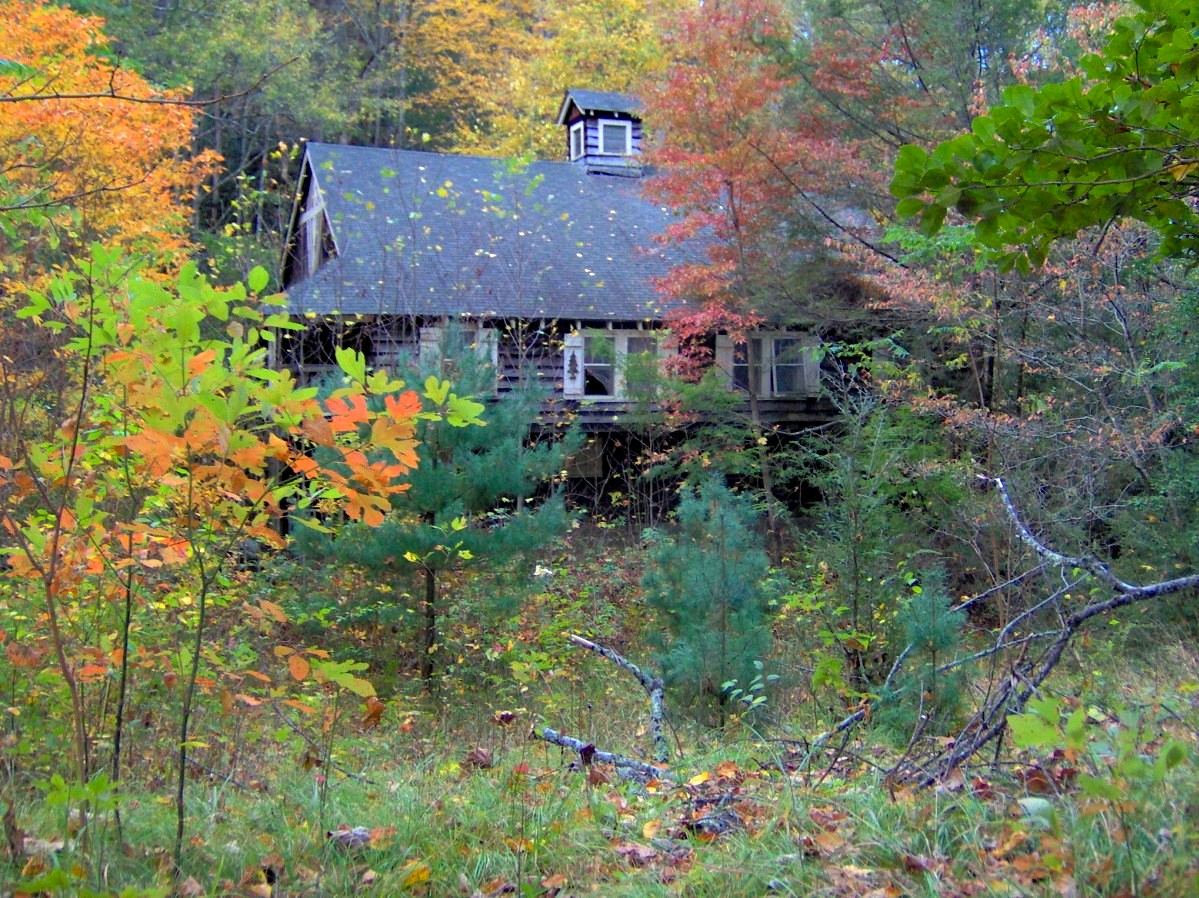
Cottage in the Appalachian Club section known as "Millionaire's Row"

In 1920, Willis P. Davis and his wife Anne, who owned a summer cottage at Elkmont, began to suggest an idea for a national park in the Smokies after a visit to Yellowstone. While the Davises merely suggested the idea to influential friends in Knoxville, it was another Elkmont cottage-owner, David C. Chapman, who took the initiative. Business owners in Knoxville quickly saw the benefits of a national park and began lobbying federal and state governments.

After the U.S. government agreed to establish the national park if the states of Tennessee and North Carolina purchased the land, Knoxville began an intensive lobbying campaign aimed at the Tennessee legislature. In 1925, Chapman hosted a group of legislators at Elkmont to promote the park idea. The following year, Colonel Townsend made the initial 76,000-acre (310 km^{2}) sale.

While Elkmont was the birth of the park movement, it was also home to one of the strongest anti-park movements. Shortly after the Townsend purchase, an attorney for Little River Lumber Company named Jim Wright rallied a hodge-podge group of attorneys, businessmen, and mountaineers at Elkmont to propose the establishment of a national forest rather than a national park. Wright also proposed a massive road-building campaign across the crest of the Smokies in hopes of increasing the land's value. Largely because of Wright's efforts, the initial bill allowing for the purchase of land in the Smokies exempted Elkmont from eminent domain. Cottage owners managed to gain a provision that allowed them to sell their cottages at half-price in exchange for lifetime leases.

== Historic structures ==
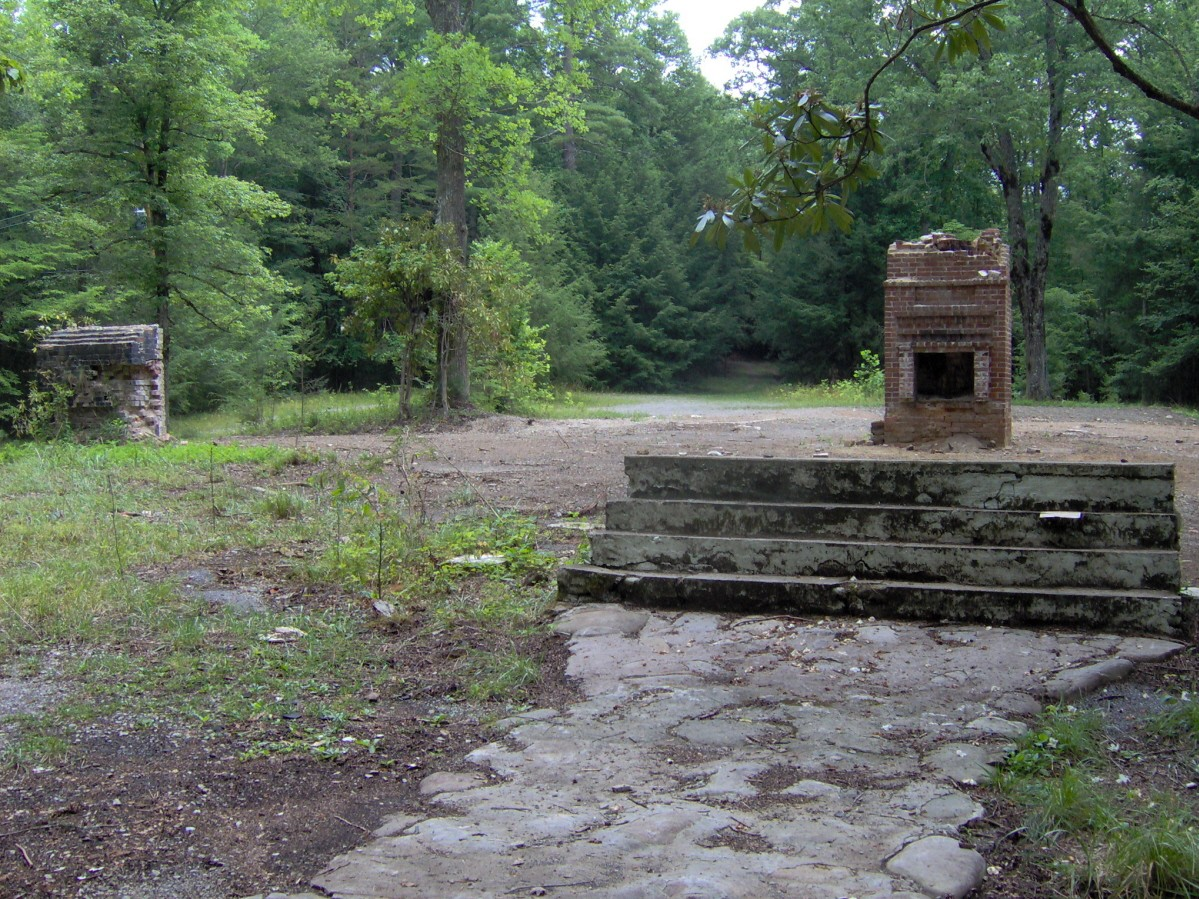
The site of the former Wonderland Hotel in 2007

To gain better electricity service and to assure the electric utility a steady supply of customers instead of a slow attrition of expiring lifetime leaseholders, most of the Appalachian Club members agreed to convert their lifetime leases to 20 year leases. There was assurance of lease renewals, and this occurred in both 1952 and 1972. Under the influence of environmental groups, especially the Sierra Club, the 1992 renewal did not occur. The Wonderland Hotel and the rustic cottages at Elkmont (other than two cottages which kept leases expiring in 2001) reverted to the National Park Service. The park's 1982 General Management Plan calls for all structures to be removed to allow nature to reclaim the affected areas. However, in 1994, the Wonderland Hotel and several of the rustic cottages were placed on the National Register of Historic Places, giving them a special status. A debate immediately ensued over the fate of these structures.

In 2005, the Wonderland Hotel collapsed from a structural failure. Parts of the hotel deemed to have historical value were removed and the rest cleared, leaving only the annex and a chimney. In May 2016 the annex suffered a devastating fire. In its 2009 Final Environmental Impact Statement for Elkmont, the National Park Service announced plans to restore the Appalachian Clubhouse and 18 cabins in the Appalachian Club section. The remaining structures were carefully documented and removed in 2018, but many chimneys remain.

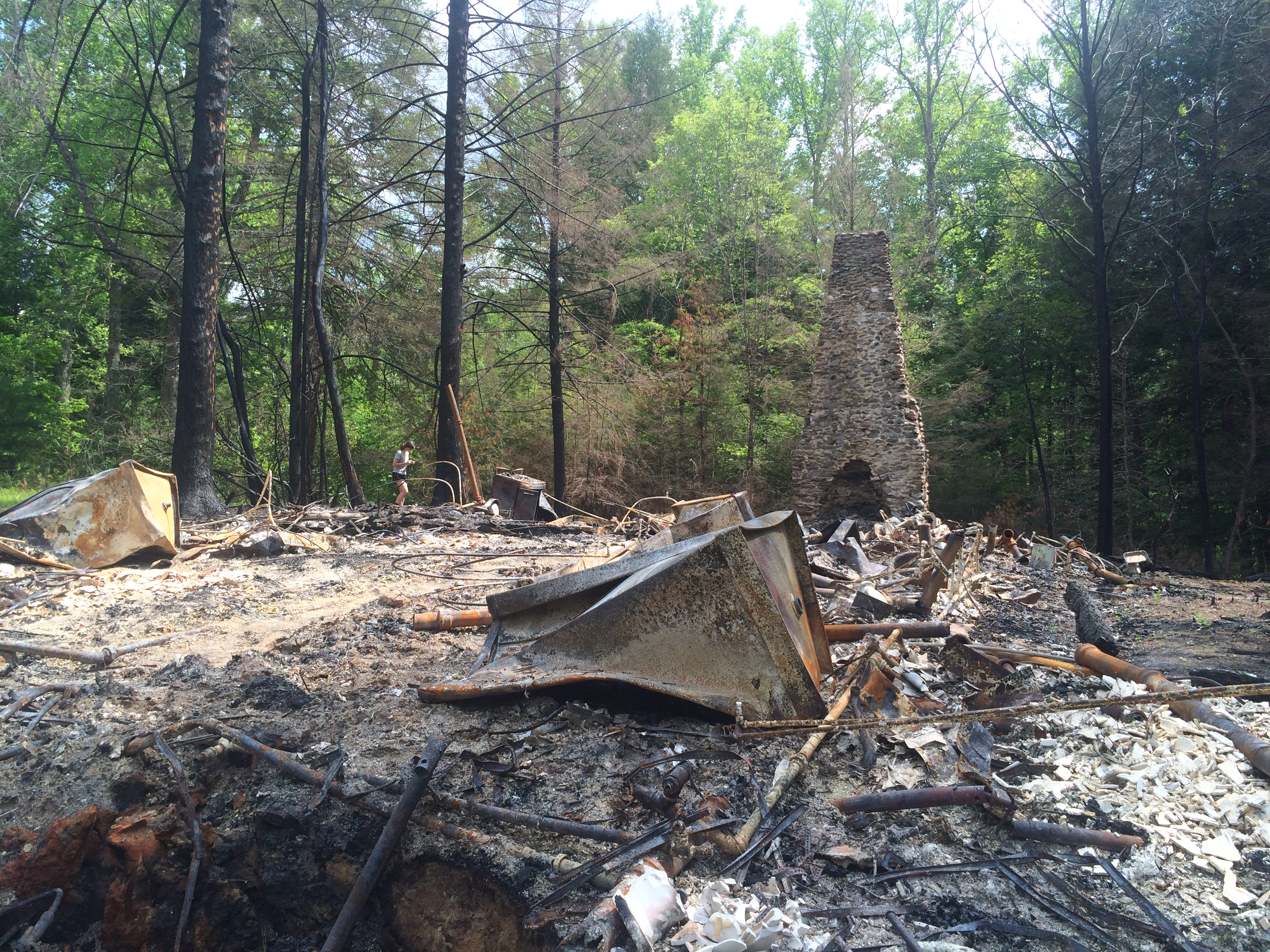
Wonderland annex after fire, May 2016

Seventeen of the nineteen structures chosen for restoration and preservation are located in the Appalachian Club's "Daisy Town" section. These were selected primarily as the oldest and most historically notable structures in the historic district. The structures include the Appalachian Clubhouse (built in 1934 to replace the original, which had burned in 1932), the Levi Trentham cabin (Elkmont's oldest surviving structure, built in 1830), the Addicks cabin and Mayo cabin (both believed to be modified lumber company shanties, or "set" houses), and a children's playhouse known as "Adamless Eden." Most of the cottages were built between 1910 and 1930 and renovated numerous times over subsequent decades (many of the porches were added in the 1970s). The cottages are typically of balloon frame construction with board and batten exteriors, the exceptions being the Smith cabin and the Levi Trentham cabin, which are log cabins.

The Byers cabin— located south of Daisy Town in the Appalachian Club's Society Hill section, was also chosen for preservation mostly because of its association with early park promoter David Chapman. The Spence cabin, a large lodge in the Appalachian Club's Millionaires' Row section, has been restored and preserved primarily for its location at the head of the Little River Trail and is available for reservations as a day use structure. All structures will be removed from the Wonderland Club section of Elkmont, and a kiosk will be placed on the site of the Wonderland Hotel to interpret the hotel's history.

== Gallery ==
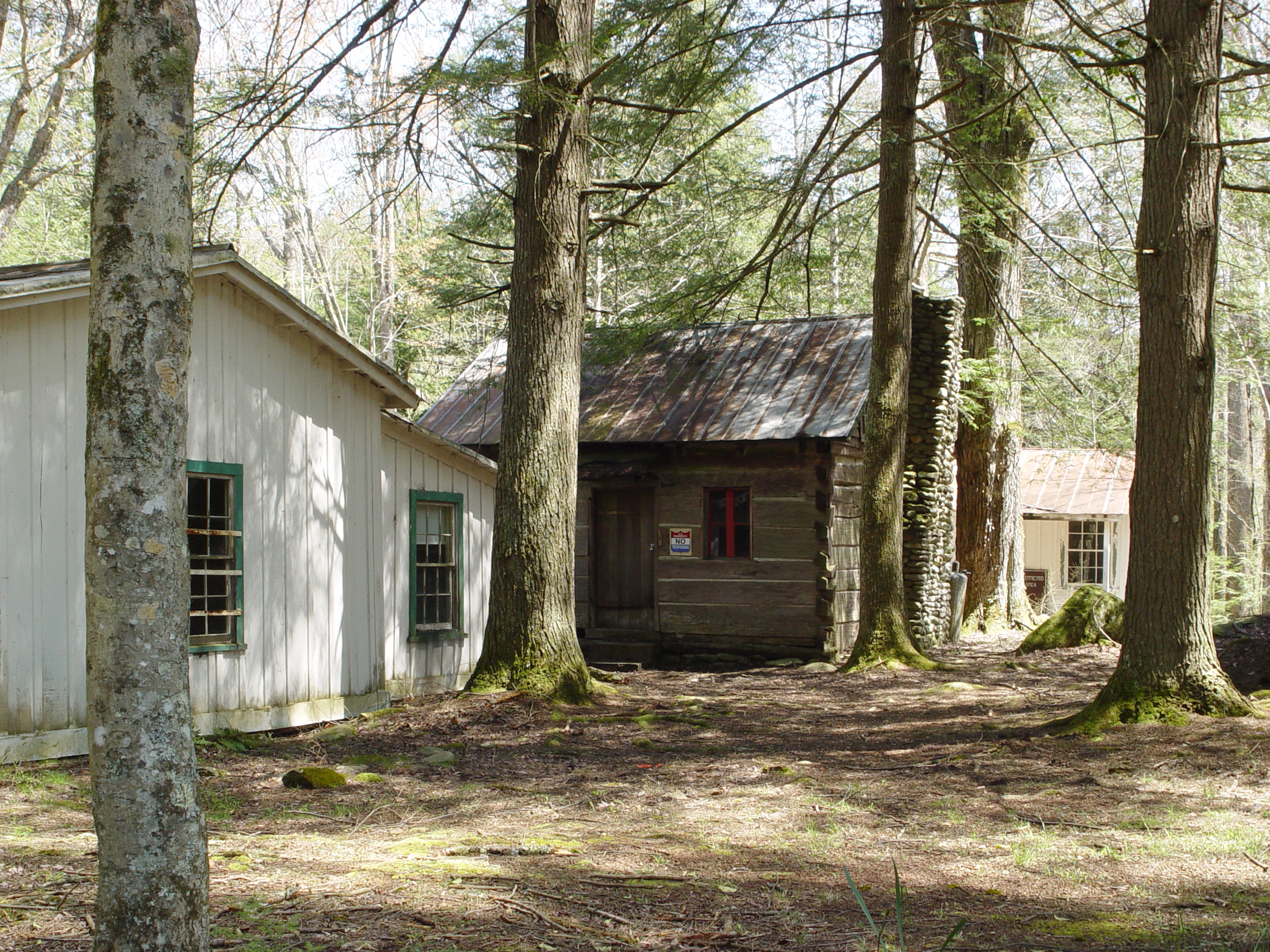
Trentham Cabin

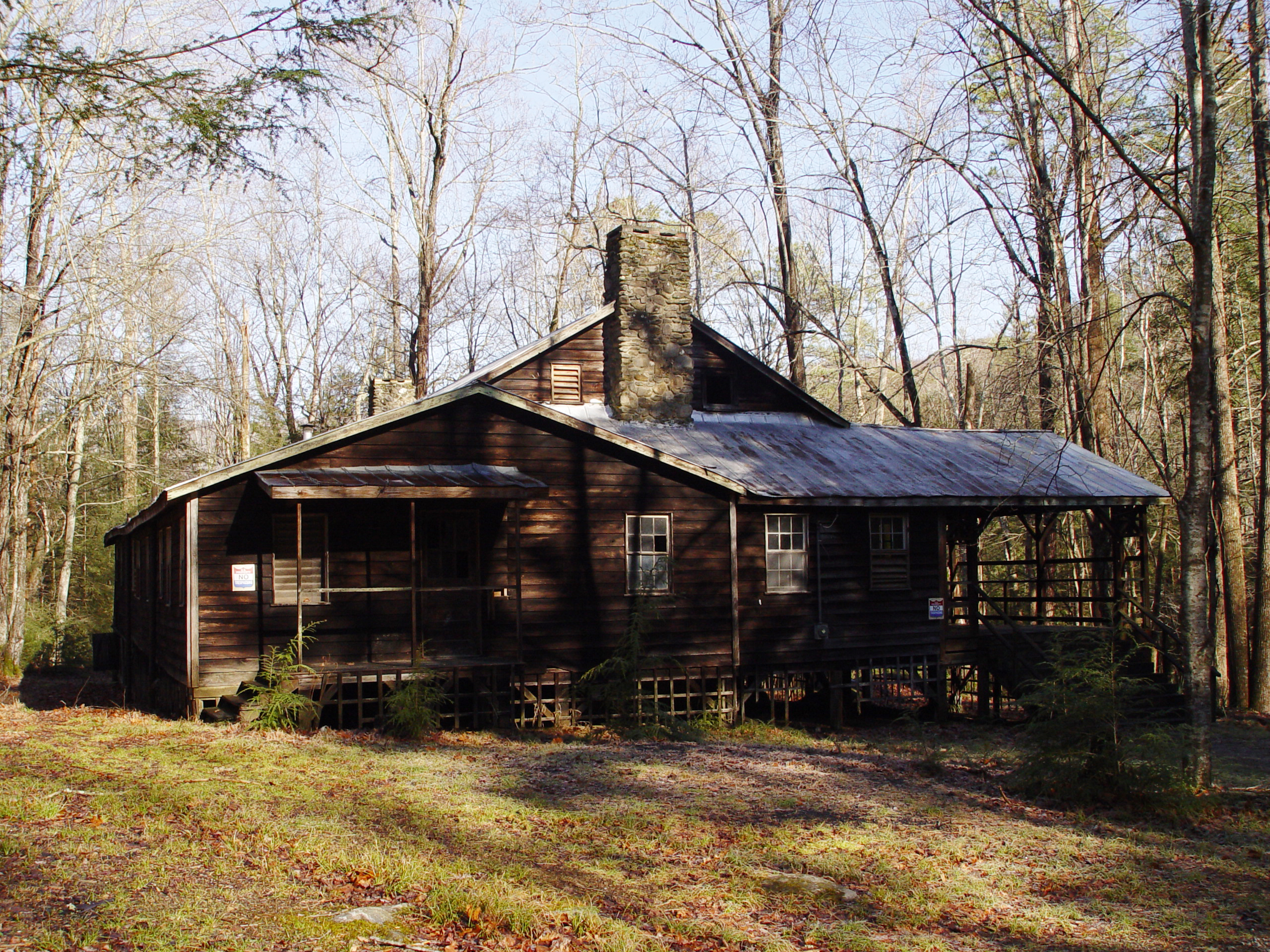
Appalachian Club

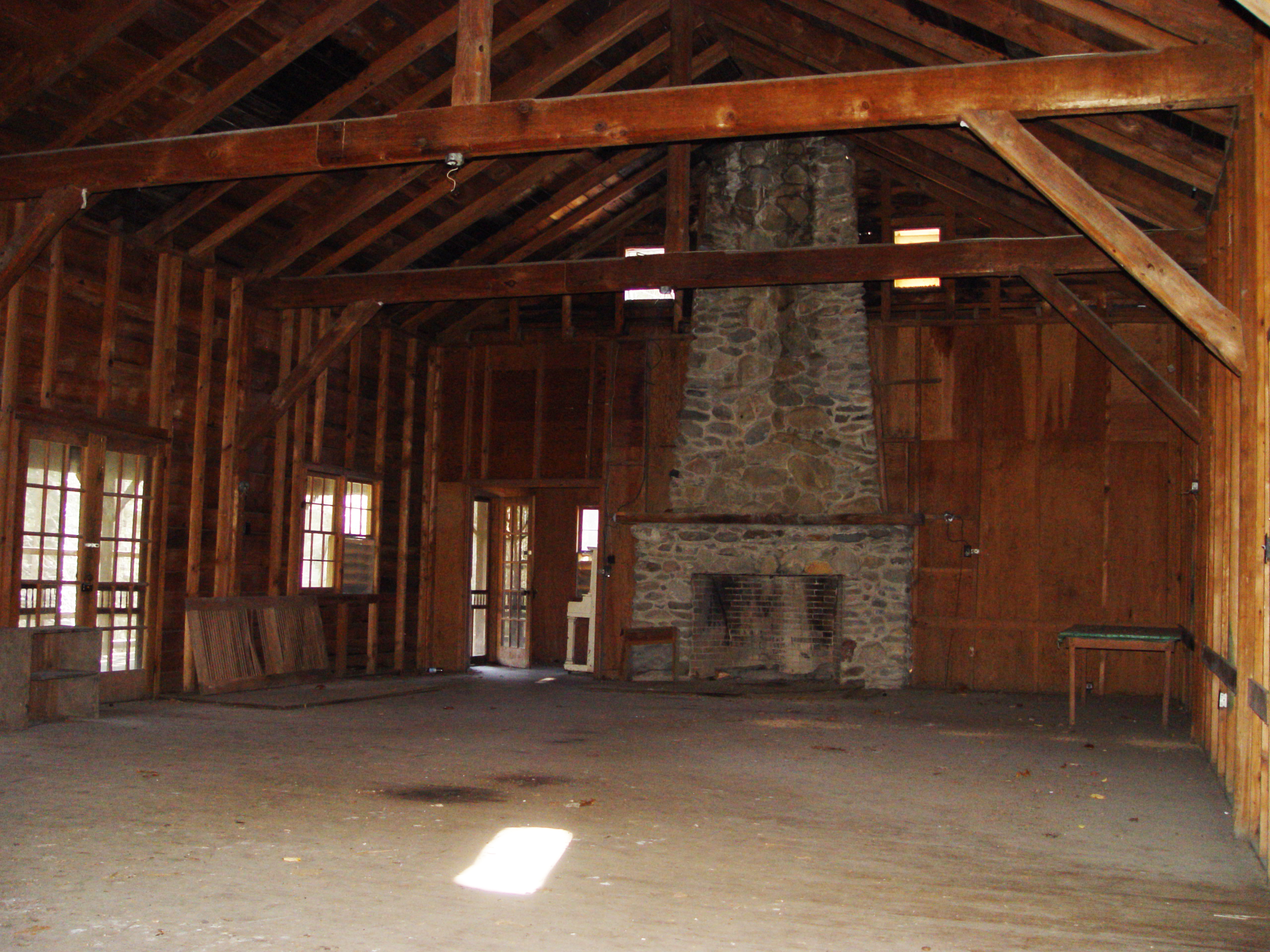
Appalachian Club, interior

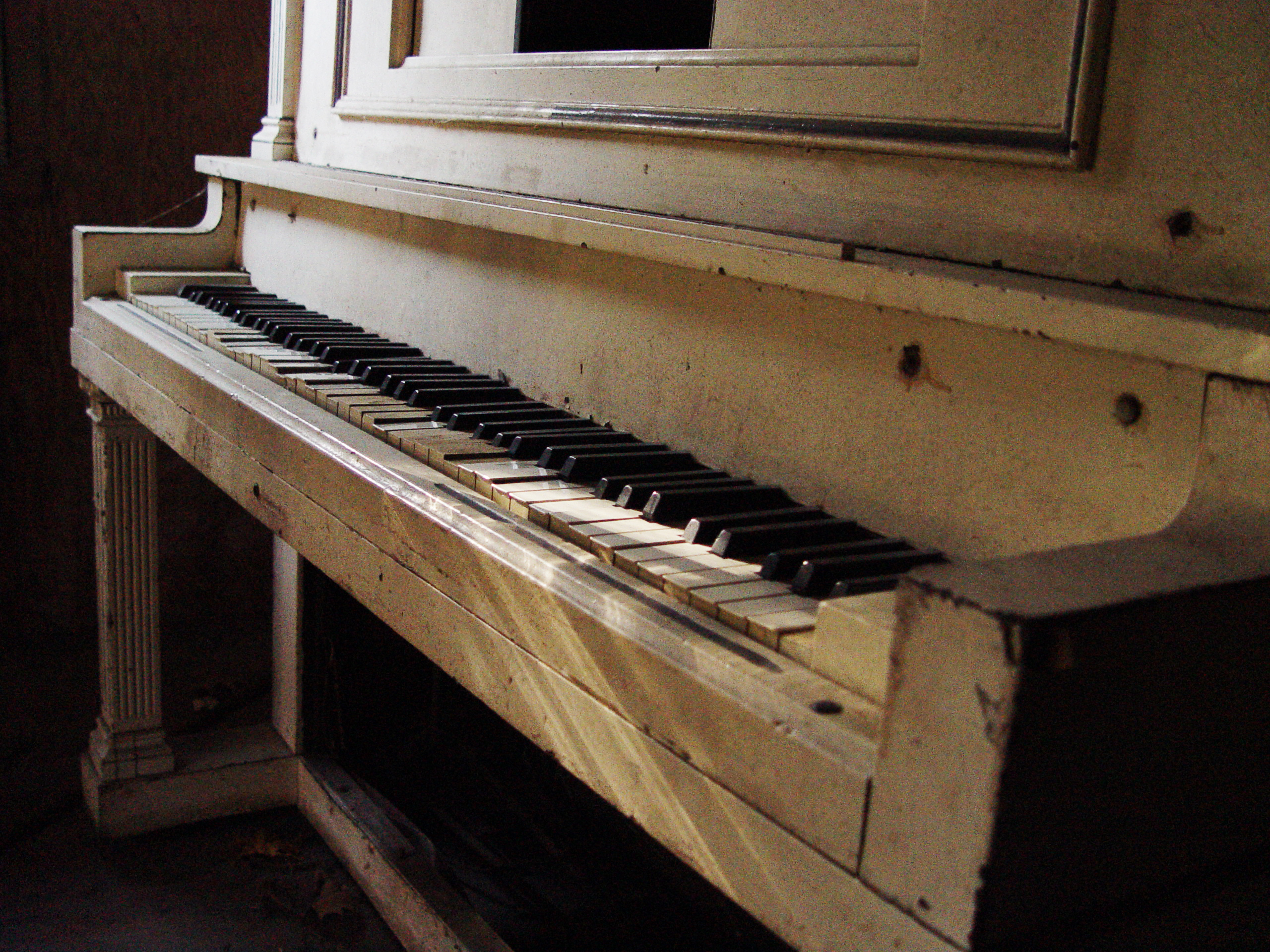
Piano in the Appalachian Club

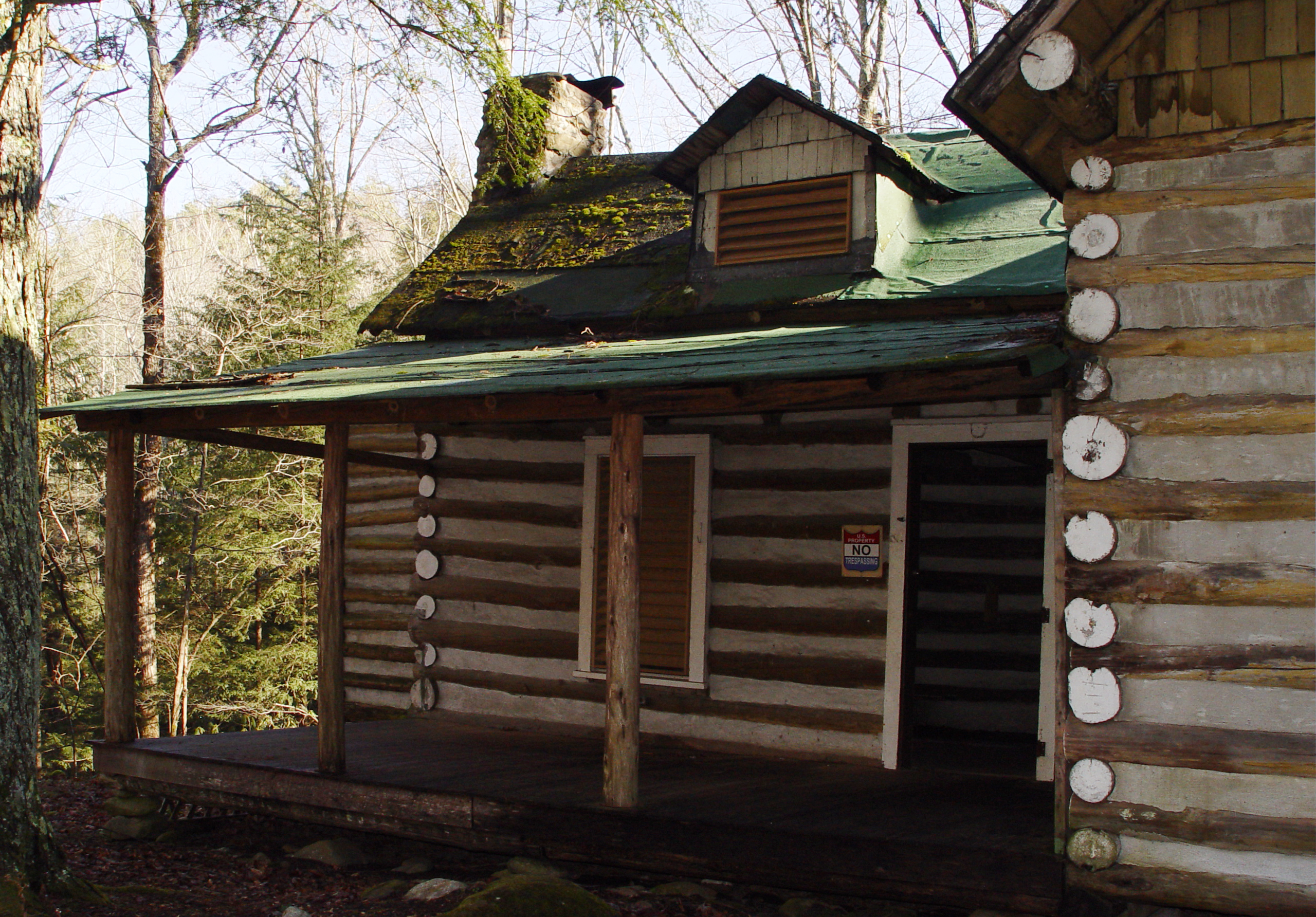
Sneed Cabin, #1

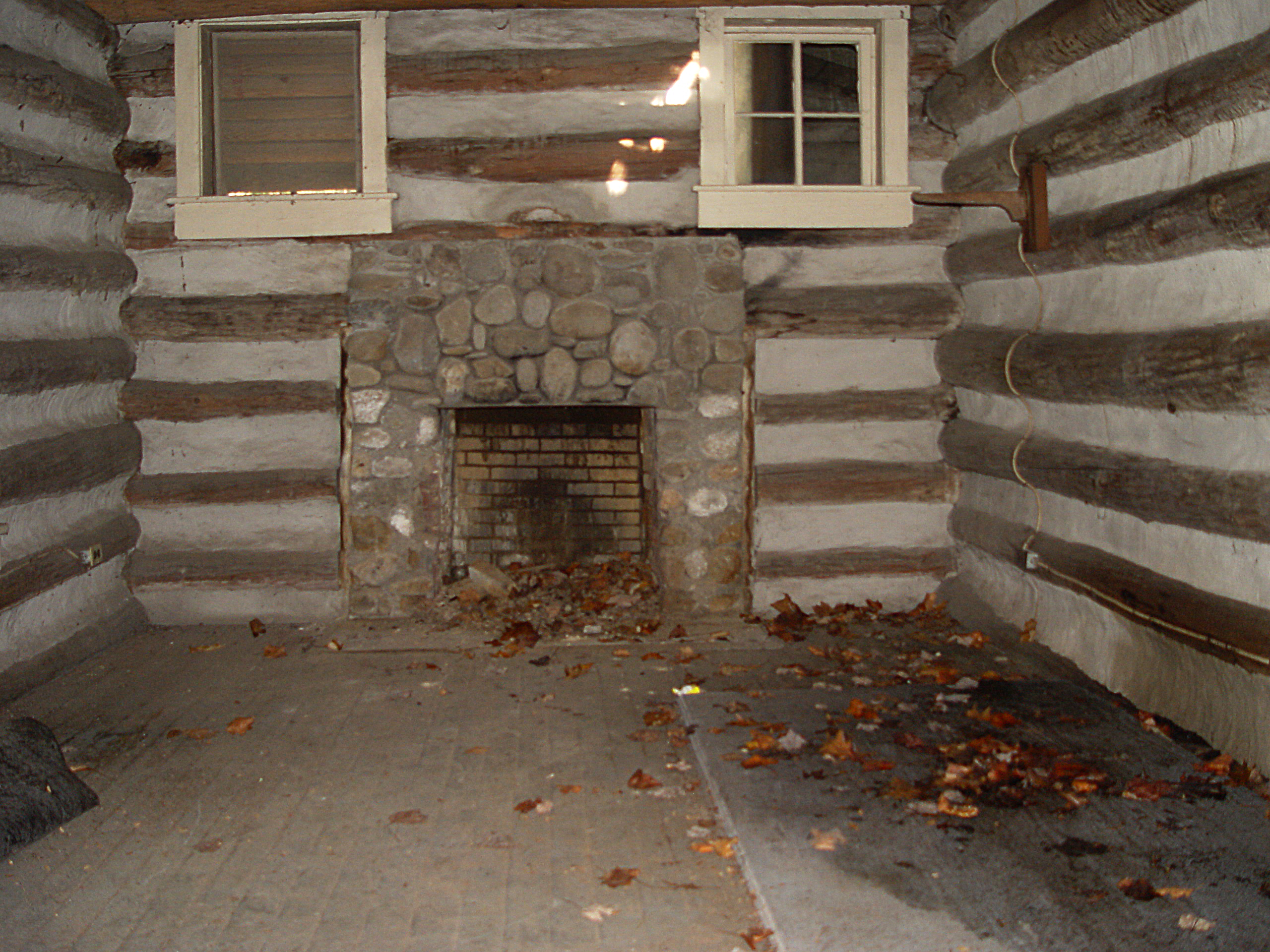
Interior of Sneed Cabin, #1

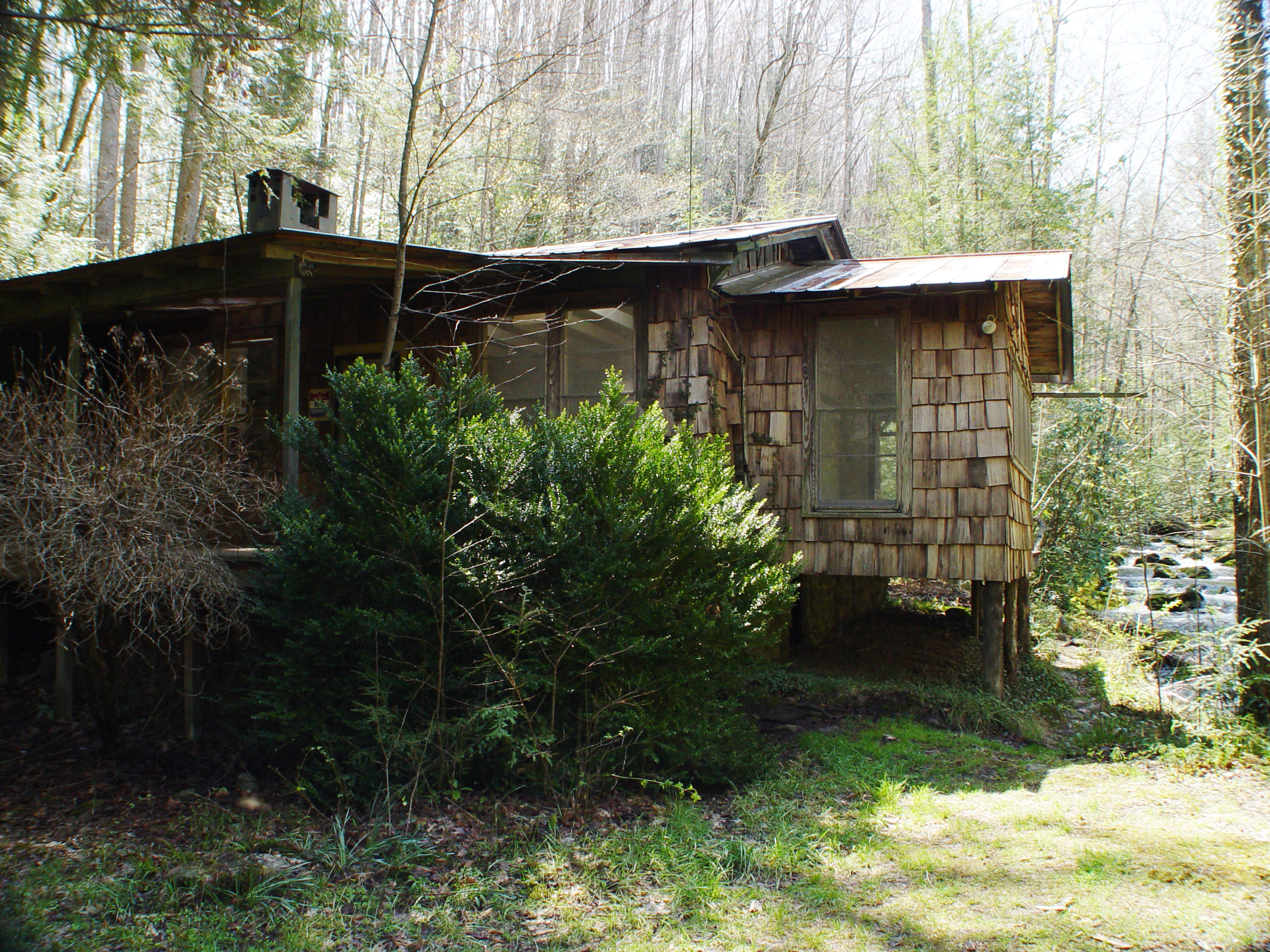
McNabb Cabin, #41

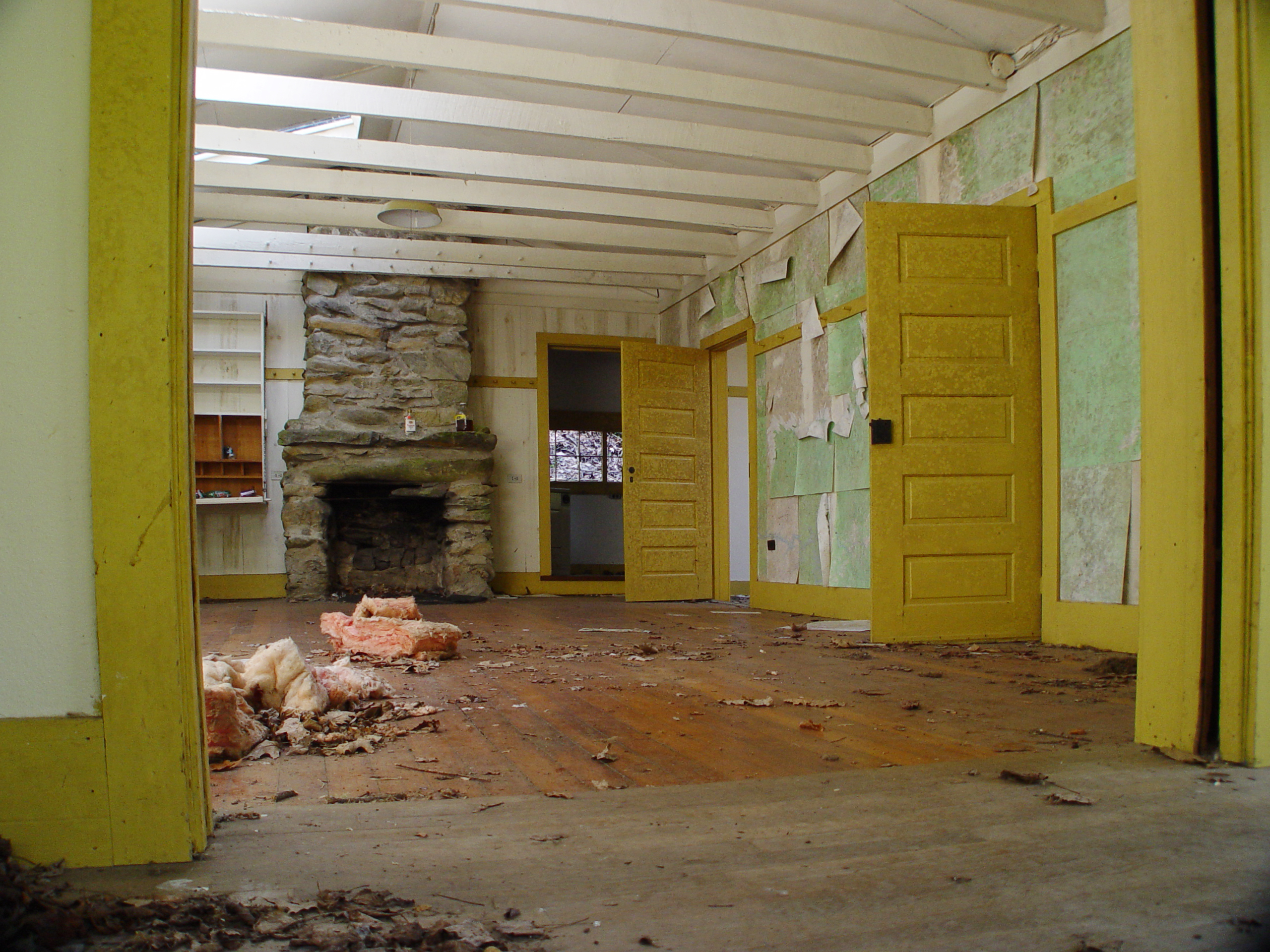
McNabb Cabin interior

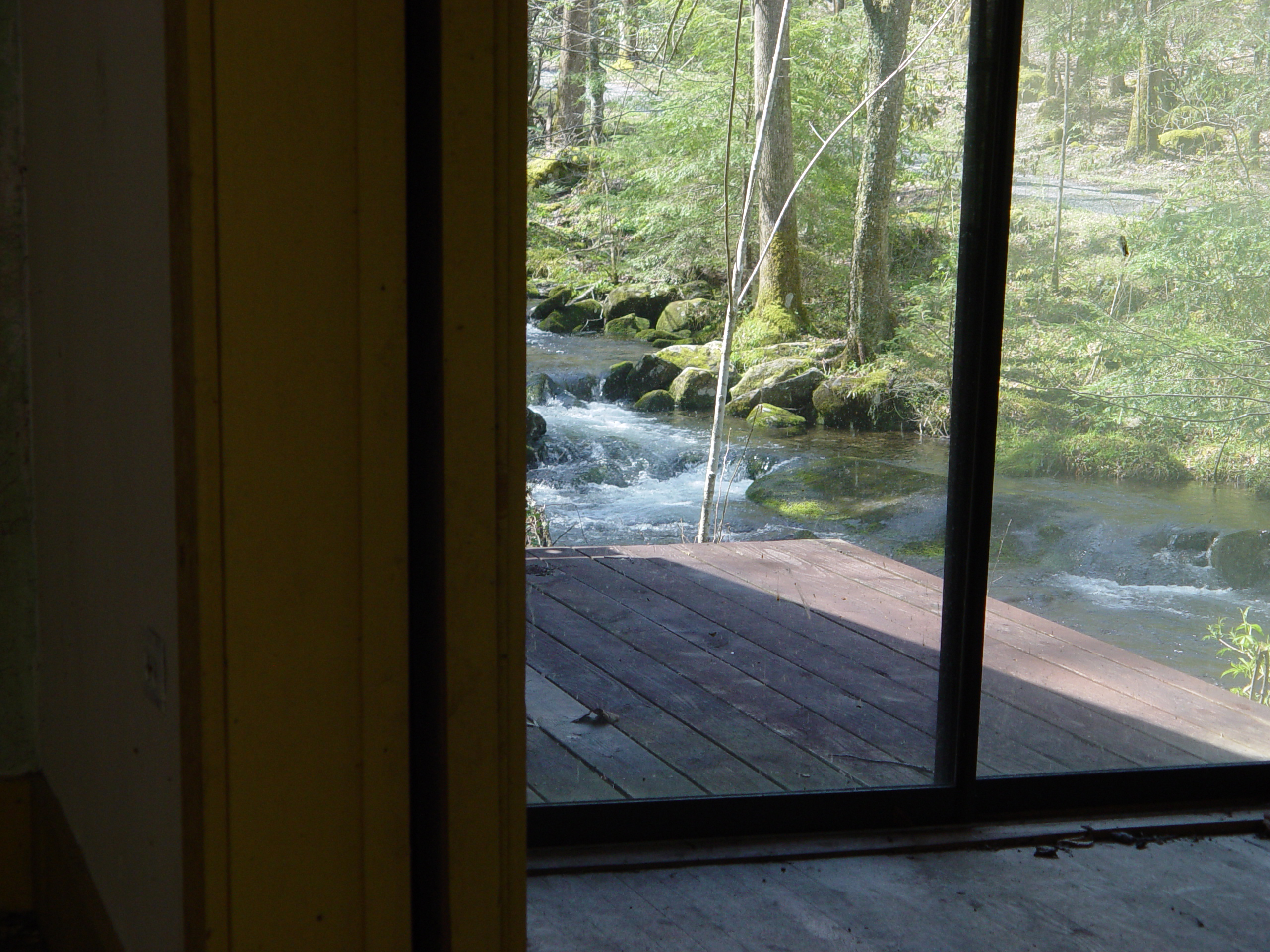
View of the creek from McNabb Cabin

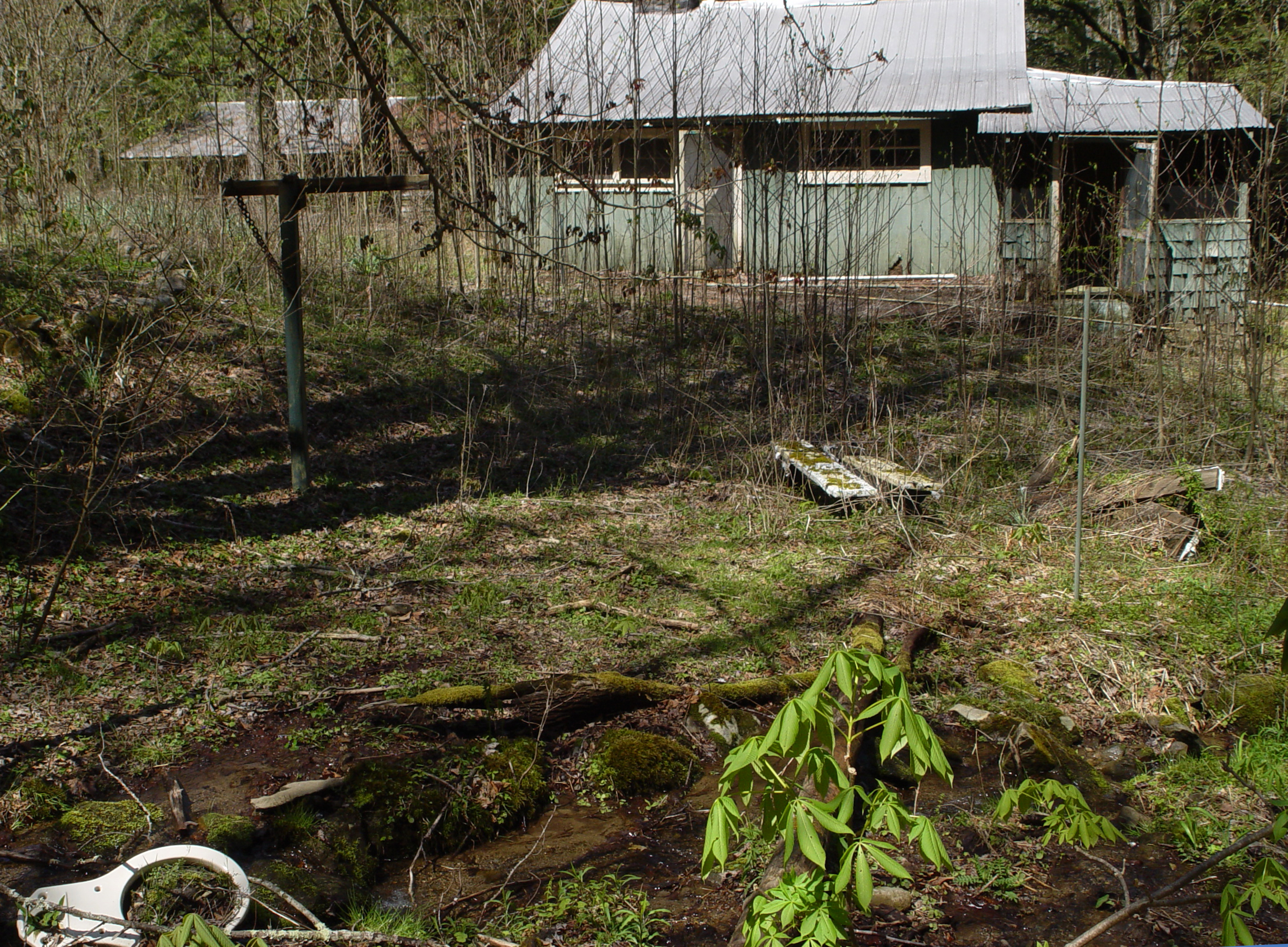
Abandoned Cabin

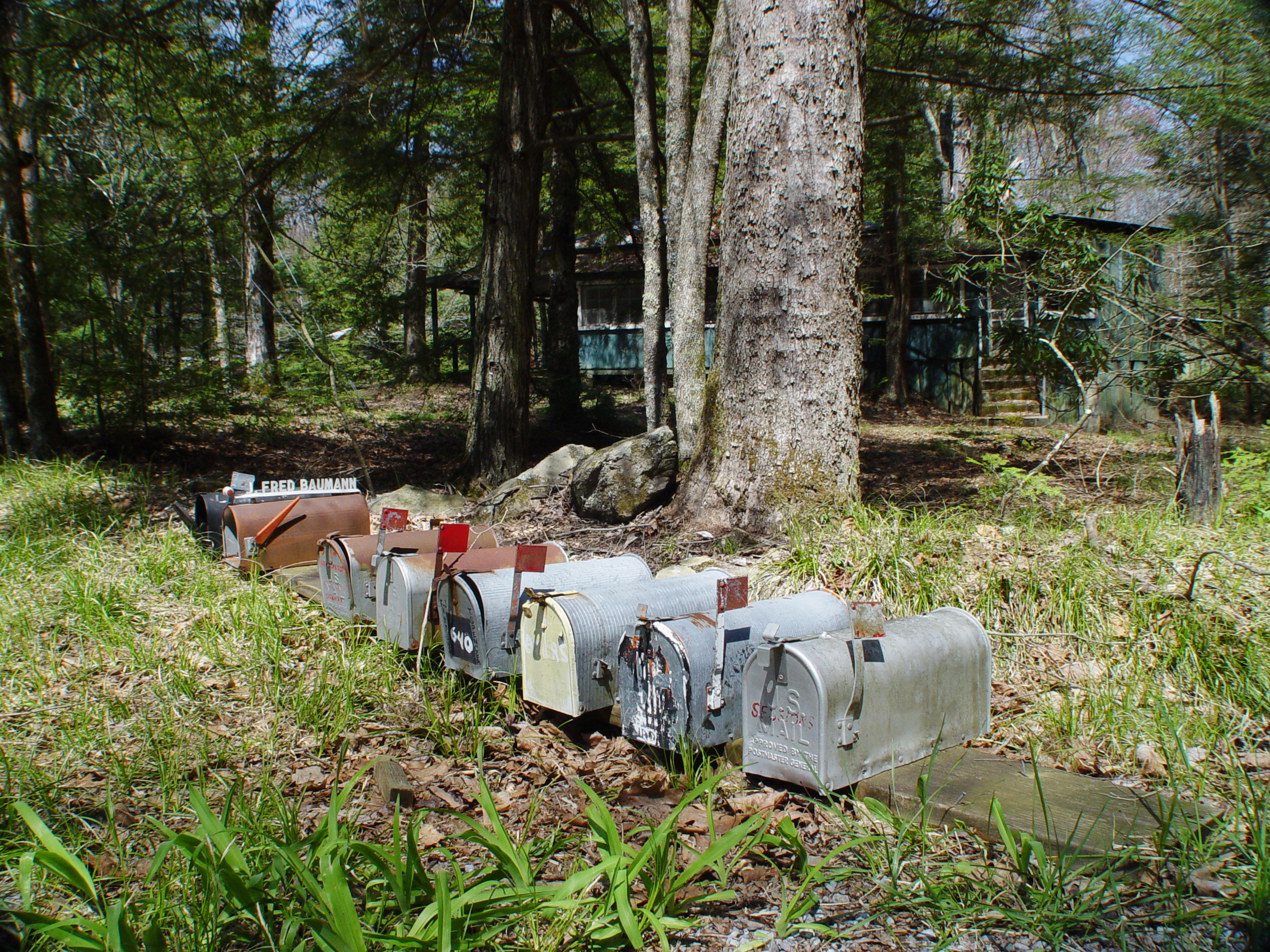
Abandoned mailboxes

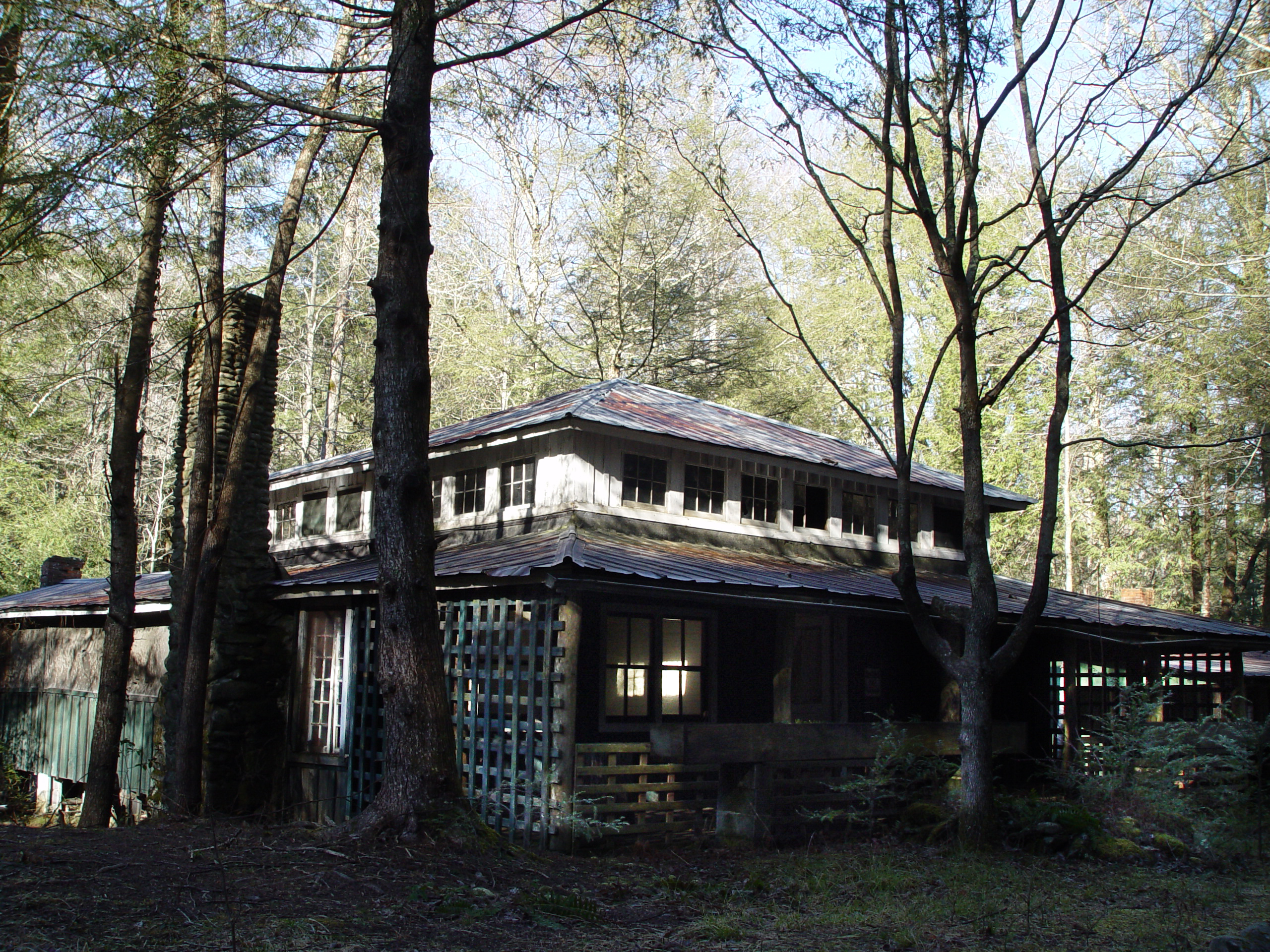
Bauman Cabin, #10
