= Walland, Tennessee =

Walland
- CDP
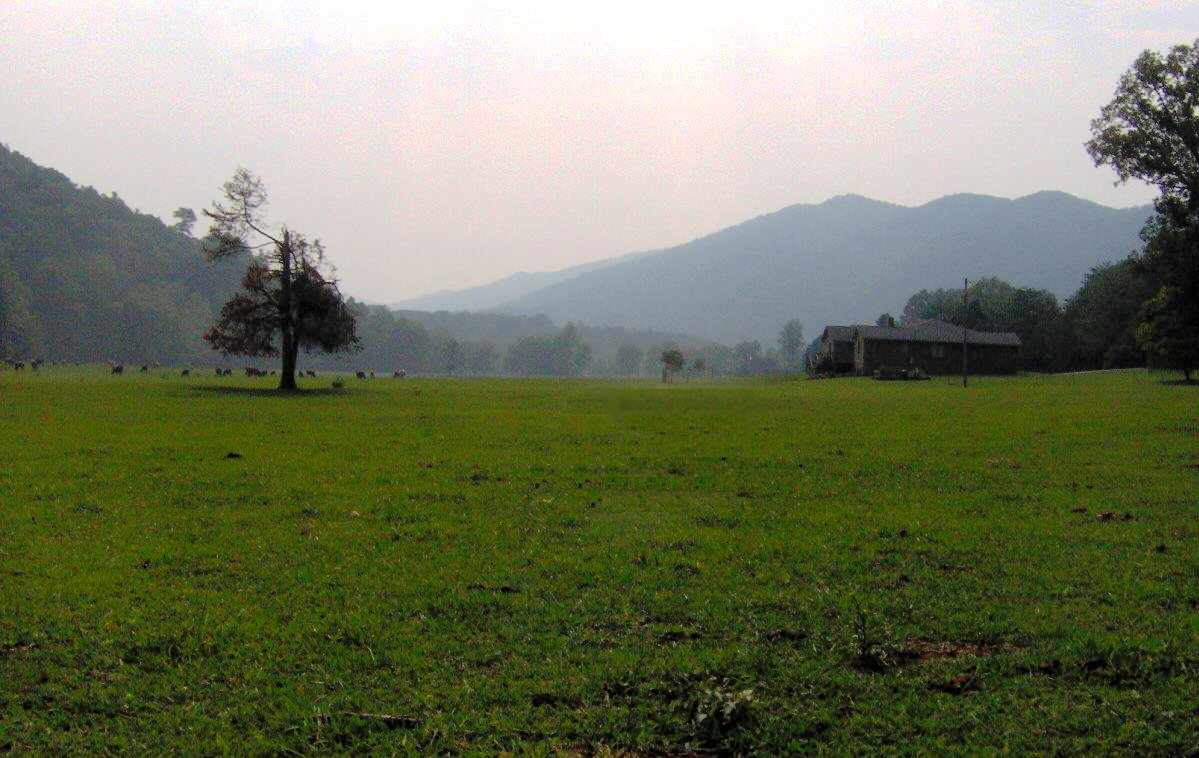
- Miller's Cove, with Chilhowee Mountain on right

- Location within the state of Tennessee Walland (the United States)
- Coordinates: 35°43′55″N 83°48′25″W
- Country: United States
- State: Tennessee
- County: Blount
- Settled: 1780s
- Named after: Walton and England Leather Company

Area
  - Total: 1.53 sq mi (3.95 km^{2})
  - Land: 1.53 sq mi (3.95 km^{2})
  - Water: 0 sq mi (0.00 km^{2})
- Elevation: 1,034 ft (315 m)

Population (2020)
  - Total: 281
  - Density: 184.3/sq mi (71.16/km^{2})
- Time zone: UTC-5 (Eastern (EST))
  - Summer (DST): UTC-4 (EDT)
- ZIP code: 37886
- Area code: 865
- GNIS feature ID: 2586084

Walland is an unincorporated community and census-designated place (CDP) in Blount County, Tennessee. Its population was 281 as of the 2020 census. Walland is the site of a post office and is the place name associated with zip code 37886, which covers an area beyond the Walland community.

== History ==
=== Early history ===
In October 1567, the Juan Pardo expedition is believed to have crossed Little River at what is now Walland. The expedition arrived from the east via Reed Creek and headed west along Hesse Creek, traversing part of Chilhowee Mountain and Happy Valley en route to the village of "Chalahume" on the Little Tennessee River.

By the time Euro-American settlers arrived in the area in the 1780s, Miller's Cove was part of a vast Cherokee hunting ground. Along with fertile land typical of any limestone cove, the various Cherokee trails in the vicinity drew the first settlers to Miller's Cove in the late 18th century. The Great Indian Warpath passed through Maryville to the north, and the Tuckaleechee and Southeastern Trail forked in Tuckaleechee Cove to the south. The Overhill Cherokee villages of Chilhowee and Tallassee lay the other end of Chilhowee Mountain.

The first Euro-American settlers arrived in Blount County around 1785, during a period when the Cherokee were increasingly resistant to colonial intrusion. Cherokee warriors attempted to repulse the colonists through sporadic attacks in the vicinity of the Warpath, but the foreigners successfully countered them by erecting small defensive forts.

Miller's Cove is probably named after Alexander Miller and his brother, Andrew Miller, who built cabins in the cove sometime around 1800. A few years before the Millers arrived, Swiss immigrant John Hess built a grist mill in the west end of the cove. He was followed by the Martin family, whose mill was situated in the cove's eastern section. Other early settlers in Miller's Cove included Alexander Reed and John Waters, both of whom arrived before 1810.

In 1810, Miller's Cove Baptist Church was formed from the division of Tuckaleechee Baptist Church between Miller's Cove and Wear Cove. The church remains one of the oldest congregations in Blount County.

=== The Civil War ===
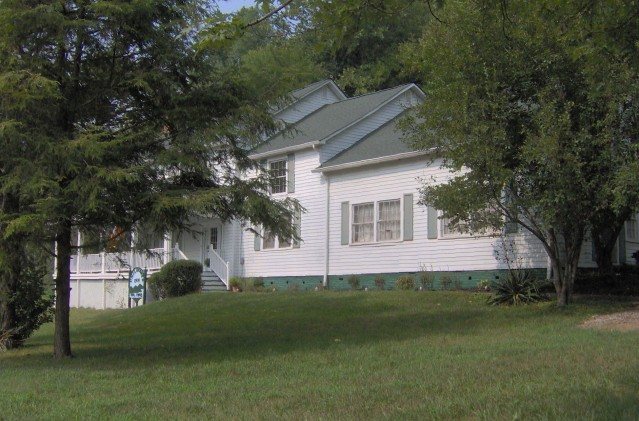
Chilhowee Inn in Walland

In 1845, George Amerine (c. 1784–1866) constructed an iron forge on Hess Creek in the western section of Miller's Cove. Using two bloomery fires and a water-driven hammer, Amerine's forge was producing 15 tons of bar iron per year by 1856. At the outset of the Civil War, the forge's operations ceased.

From the early 19th century onward, Blount County was a hotbed of abolitionist activity, due in large part to the influence of Rev. Isaac Anderson of Maryville College and the Quaker community at Friendsville. When Tennessee voted on whether or not to secede from the Union in 1861, only 24% of Blount Countians voted in favor of secession.

Miller's Cove was no exception to Blount's pro-Union sentiment. In 1861, after the outbreak of the war, Union supporters held a rally in Miller's Cove, on the grounds of what is now Chilhowee Inn. Residents from the surrounding hills and mountains raised an American flag and saluted it, pledging their loyalty to the United States. Later in the war, when a Confederate Army unit passed through the cove, Maryville Judge Jesse Wallace warned them to leave the flag alone, for "the mountains swarmed with men who were deadly with their rifles." Heeding the warning, the Confederate soldiers saluted the flag and continued onward.

=== The Progressive Era, 1890–1931 ===
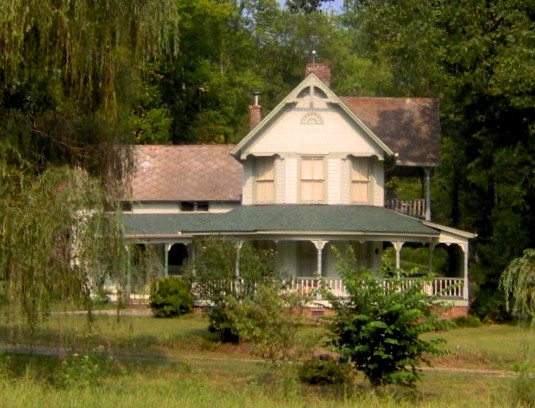
The home of James Martin in Walland, built early 1900s

In 1893, the Walton and England Leather Co. of Philadelphia, Pennsylvania sent John W. Fisher to East Tennessee to look for suitable sites to build a tannery. Fisher selected Newport and Miller's Cove, both being accessible via railroad or river, and having access to seemingly endless rows of trees, the bark of which was used in the tanning process. Fisher's son, A.J., managed Walton and England's Miller's Cove tannery, and a small company town developed in the tannery's vicinity. The town was named Walland, which was a fusion of "Walton" and "England." Fisher's house still stands on Old Walland Highway, and is listed on the National Register of Historic Places.

In 1901, using the railroad Walton and England had constructed between Walland and Maryville, the Schlosser Leather Company initiated an even more ambitious tanning project in Miller's Cove. Using the thick bark from trees harvested in the heavily forested Little River valley, the Schlosser tannery was processing 300 hides per day by 1909. The tannery allowed Walland to modernize to some extent, bringing electricity, framed houses, and greater railroad access. The company built Chilhowee Inn in 1902 to house executives visiting the tannery, and helped complete Walland High School in 1922.

While Schlosser Leather ceased operations in the area after the tannery burned in 1931, Walland was already benefiting from the growth of tourism in the Great Smokies several miles to the south. The Little River Railroad was completed from Walland to Elkmont in the early 20th century by W. B. Townsend's Little River Lumber Company. While initially a logging railroad, the line was offering passenger service to the mountains by 1909. Several resorts sprang up in the vicinity of Miller's Cove, using the health-restoring qualities of mountain springs to lure tourists. These included Montvale Springs, on the other side of Chilhowee Mountain to the north, and Kinzel Springs at the northern tip of Tuckaleechee Cove to the south. With the formation of the Great Smoky Mountains National Park in 1934 and the construction of US-321, Walland was able to replace the loss of tannery jobs with income from through-traffic and tourism.

In 1966, one of the first sections of Foothills Parkway was completed across the western crest of Chilhowee Mountain, connecting Walland with Chilhowee Lake. Another section, connecting Walland with Wears Valley, was opened to the public in November 2018

== Geography ==
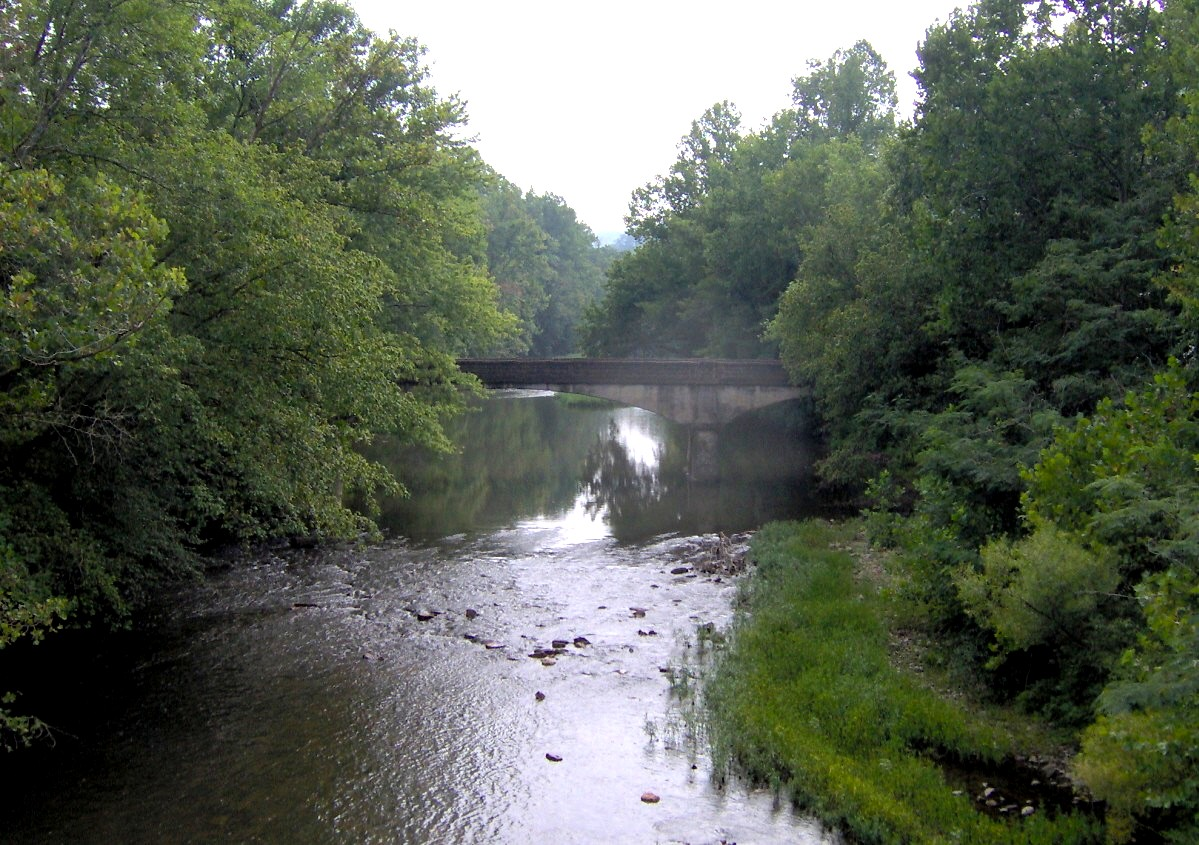
Little River in Walland

Walland is situated in Miller's Cove, an enclosed valley in the northwestern foothills of the Great Smoky Mountains. Miller's Cove (spelled "Miller Cove" on USGS maps) is walled off to the north by Chilhowee Mountain, a low ridge stretching for 35 miles between the Little Tennessee River to the west and the Little Pigeon River watershed to the east. Hurricane Mountain to the southwest and Bates Mountain to the southeast divide Miller's Cove from the much larger Tuckaleechee Cove at the base of the Smokies.

Little River, which flows down from its source on the northern slopes of Kuwohi, splits Miller's Cove into eastern and western sections en route to flatlands of northern Blount County. The river's valley, which divides Hurricane and Bates Mountain and slices a large gap through Chilhowee Mountain, has long provided a convenient bottomland for trails and roads linking the coves of the northern Smokies. Today, it is traversed by U.S. Route 321, which connects Interstate 40 to the Great Smoky Mountains National Park. The park boundary is about 15 miles south of Walland.

== Demographics ==
Historical population
Census	Pop.	Note	%±
2010	259		—
2020	281		8.5%
U.S. Decennial Census

As of the census of 2000, there were 3,746 people, 1,504 households, and 1,143 families residing in the Zip Code Tabulation Area for the zip code (37886) that serves Walland. The racial makeup of this area was 97% White, 0.1% African American, 0.6% Asian American, and 0.7% Native American. Hispanics and Latinos comprise 1% of the population.

Of the 1,504 households, 30.5% had children under the age of 18 living with them, 65% were married couples living together, 7.6% had a female householder with no husband present, and 24% were non-families. The average household size was 2.49 and the average family size was 2.86. 77.5% of the population was 18 years of age or older with 12.4% being 65 years of age or older. The median age was 39.3 years. The population was 50% male and 50% female.

The median income for a household in the area was $40,000, and the median income for a family was $43,042. The per capita income for the city was $18,337. About 9.2% of families and 12.4% of the population were below the poverty line.

== Education ==
There is currently one public school located in Walland: Walland Elementary School, part of the Blount County Schools system. The school, located at 247 E. Miller's Cove Rd., was previously a middle school and high school. The present building was constructed in the 1960s. Among the school's outreach efforts is a bookmobile project in the community

Prior to its closing in the mid-1970s, Walland High School won a state championship in football in 1975–22-6 over White House.
