= Meigs =

Meigs may refer to:

== People ==
- Meigs (surname)

== Places in the United States ==
- Meigs, Georgia
- Meigs, Ohio
- Meigs County, Ohio
- Meigs Township, Adams County, Ohio
- Meigs Township, Muskingum County, Ohio
- Meigs County, Tennessee
- Meig's Key, in the Florida Keys
- Fort Meigs, a fortification in Ohio during the War of 1812
- Mount Meigs, Alabama

== Ships ==
- USAT Meigs, a U.S. Army transport ship sunk early in World War II
- USS General M. C. Meigs, a U.S. Navy transport ship in World War II

== Other uses ==
- Meigs Elevated Railway, an experimental monorail once built in East Cambridge, Massachusetts
- Meigs Field, former Chicago, Illinois, airport named in honor of Merrill C. Meigs
- Meigs High School, Pomeroy, Ohio
- Meigs School, Nashville, Tennessee
- Meigs Mountain Trail, in the Great Smoky Mountains National Park, U.S.
- Meigs's syndrome, a disorder of the female reproductive system
- Mrs. Meigs, a character in a series of novels by Elizabeth Frances Corbett

== See also ==
- Meggs (disambiguation)
- Meiggs (disambiguation)
- Meigs Creek (disambiguation)
- Meigs-Bishop House, an historic building in Madison, Connecticut
