= Meggs =

Meggs is the surname of:

== People ==
- Brown Meggs (1930–1997), American music executive
- Fred Meggs (1952–2014), American composer
- Geoff Meggs (born 1951), Canadian politician
- Kelly Meggs (born 1969), American seditionist
- Lindsay Meggs (born 1962), American university baseball coach
- Philip B. Meggs (1942–2002), American graphic designer
- Tony Meggs, British petroleum executive and former civil servant
- William Joel Meggs (born 1942), American physician

== Fictional characters ==
- the title character of Ginger Meggs, an Australian comic strip

== See also ==
- MEGG, a singer
- Meigs (disambiguation)
- Meiggs (disambiguation)
