= Meigs (surname) =

Meigs is a surname. Notable people with the name include:

- Arthur Ingersoll Meigs (1882–1956), American architect
- Charles Delucena Meigs (1792–1869), American obstetrician
- Cornelia Meigs (1884–1973), American children's book author and educator
- Daniel Bishop Meigs (1835–1916), Canadian politician
- George Anson Meigs (1816–1897), American entrepreneur, businessman and shipbuilder
- Henry Meigs (1782–1861), American politician from New York
- Henry Meigs, Jr. (1809–1887), American politician from New Jersey, and president of the New York Stock Exchange
- Joe Vincent Meigs (1892–1963), American obstetrician and gynecologist
- John Rodgers Meigs (1841–1864), Union Army officer during the American Civil War
- Josiah Meigs (1757–1822), American college professor, journalist, and president of the University of Georgia
- Leo O. Meigs (1879–1923), American politician
- Mary Meigs (1917–2002), American-born painter and writer
- Merrill C. Meigs (1883–1968), American newspaper executive and publisher
- Montgomery Meigs (disambiguation), multiple people
- Peveril Meigs (1903–1979), American geographer
- Return Meigs (disambiguation), multiple people
- Sandra Meigs (born 1953), Canadian artist

== See also ==
- Meigs (disambiguation)
- Meiggs (disambiguation)
