= Meigs Creek =

Meigs Creek may refer to the following streams in the United States:

- Meigs Creek (Muskingum River tributary), in Ohio
- Meigs Creek, Meigs Mountain Trail, in Tennessee

== See also ==
- Meigs (disambiguation)
