= Mahowald =

Mahowald is a surname and may refer to:

- Mark Mahowald (1931–2013), American mathematician
- Meghan Elisse Mahowald (born February 7, 1991), better known by her stage name MEGG, American singer, songwriter, and musician
- Misha Mahowald (1963–1996), American computational neuroscientist
- Natalie Mahowald (born 1963), American Earth scientist
