= Kizziah J. Bills =

American journalist

- Born: Kizziah Jones circa January 19, 1860; Florence, Alabama, US
- Died: February 24, 1924 (aged 64); Chicago, Illinois, US
- Other names: Mrs. K.J. Bills, Kizziah J. Stith, Kizzie J. Bills
- Occupations: Black American suffragist, correspondent and columnist for Black press, civil rights activist.
- Known for: Early suffragist work in the United States
- Spouse(s): Nathan J. Stith (c.1880–c.1881), Satto Bills (1893–1891)
- Children: 1

Kizziah Jones Bills (c. January 19, 1860 – February 24, 1924), also known as Mrs. K.J. Bills, Kizziah J. Stith, Kizzie J. Bills, was a Black American suffragist, a correspondent and columnist for Black press in Chicago, and a civil rights activist. She is known as an early member of the Ida B. Wells Club, the Alpha Suffrage Club and served as president of the Civic League.

== Biography ==
Her name at birth was Kizziah Jones, she was born January 19, 1860 (or 1862), in Florence, Alabama, to Patsey (née Hendricks) and Poindexter Jones. She was raised in Davidson County, Tennessee in a cabin. Starting at a young age she worked as a seamstress.

In c.1880, she married Dr. Nathan J. Stith and together they had a son, Andrew Haydn Stith (born 1889). By 1891, she was a widow and started using the name "Kizzie". She worked in 1891–1892 at Meigs School, a segregated public school in Nashville.

=== Women's clubs ===
In 1893, she married Satto Bills and they moved to Chicago. She worked as a seamstress and Satto Bills worked as a cook and later as a railroad worker. She joined many women's clubs in Chicago and was an early member of the Ida B. Wells Club (previously named the Women's Era Club) and Bills was the first president of the Julia Gaston Club. Satto Bills died in 1901, leaving her as a widow again.

In 1905, she served as the president of the Civic League, served as the recording secretary of the Tennesseans, and joined as a member, the Grand Foundation United Order of True Reformers.

In 1913 she joined the Alpha Suffrage Club, which is thought to be the first black female suffrage club. Starting in 1914, Bills served as the editor of the club newspaper, The Alpha Suffrage Record. She later served as a writer in the 1930s for The Alpha Suffrage Record's "Clubs and Society" column.

=== The Chicago Defender ===
Between 1910 until 1915, under the name "Mrs. K.J. Bills", she wrote for The Chicago Defender newspaper. Her most famous publication was in 1915 on the film premiere of The Birth of a Nation in Chicago, an American silent epic drama film which is part fiction and part history, chronicling the assassination of Abraham Lincoln by John Wilkes Booth and the relationship of two families in the Civil War and Reconstruction eras over the course of several years. Bills reviewed the film with a critical lens and debunked much of the storyline for a lack of historical facts, while reflecting on her own experiences as a Black woman living during the Reconstruction era in the American South.

She died in Chicago on February 24, 1924, after an illness.
