= Tremont, Tennessee =

Coordinates: 35°37′15″N 83°40′39″W

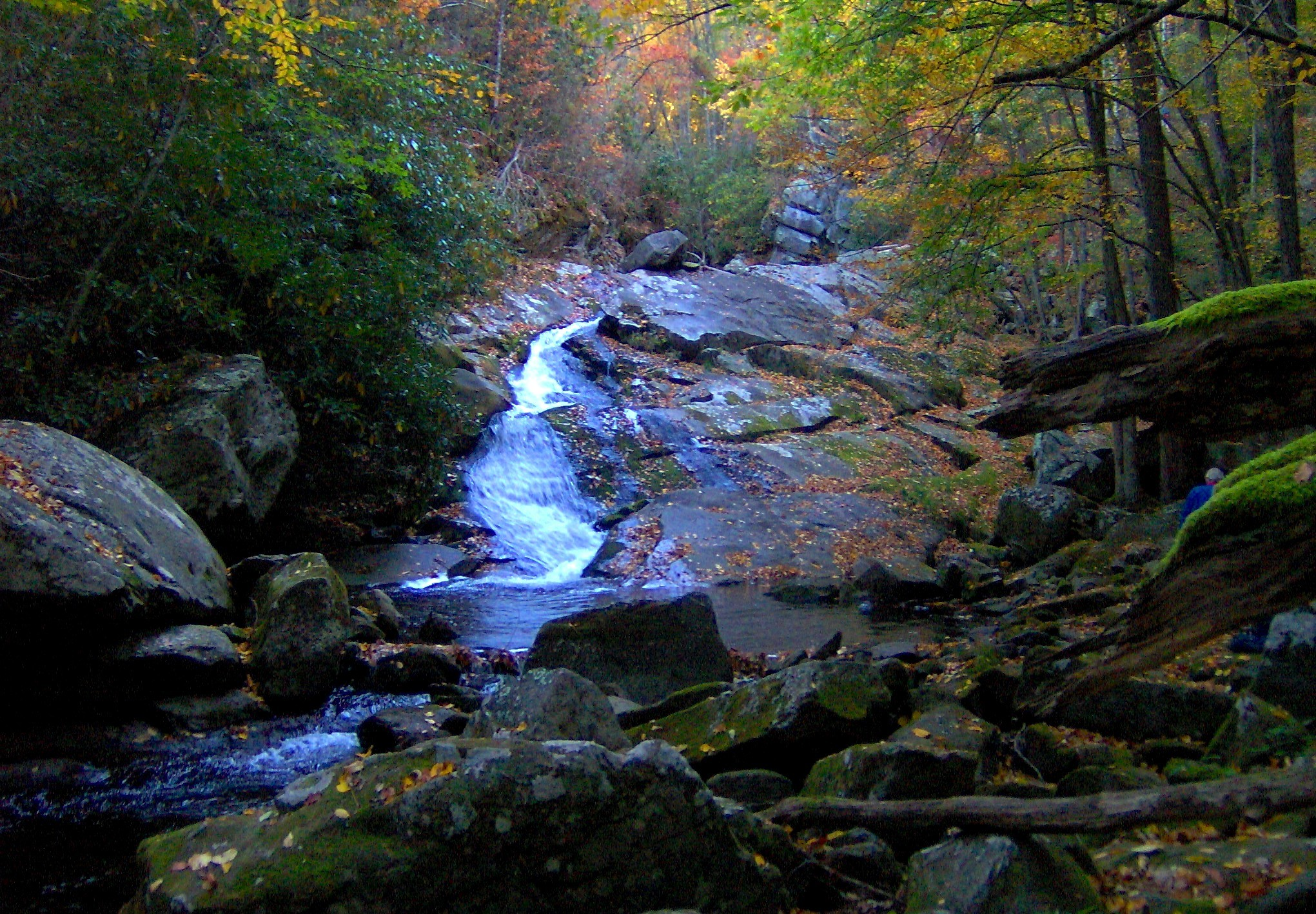
Lynn Camp Prong

Tremont is a region in the northwestern Great Smoky Mountains National Park, located in the southeastern United States. Formerly home to a pioneer Appalachian community and logging town, Tremont is now the location of the Great Smoky Mountains Institute at Tremont.

== Geography ==
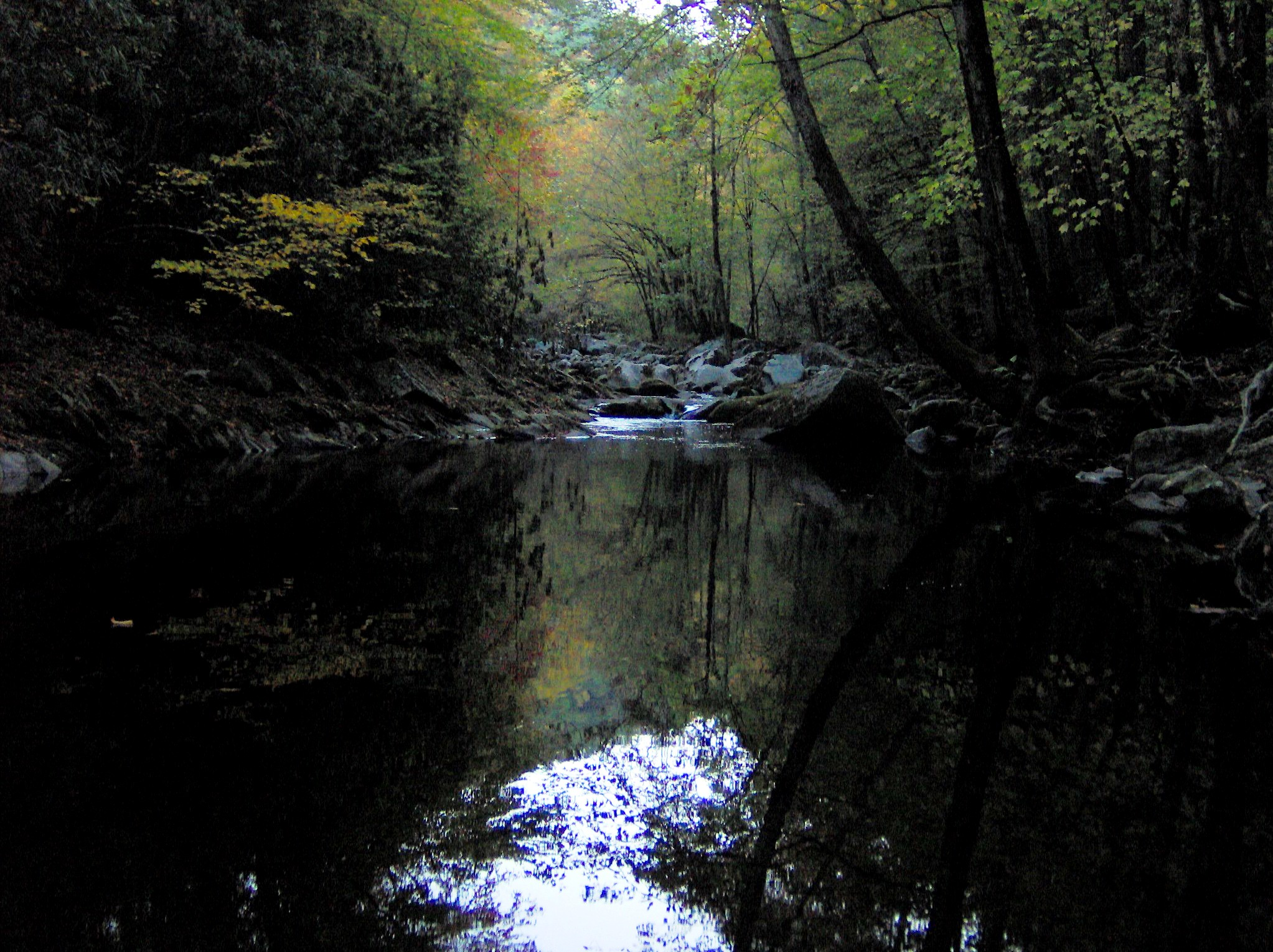
Middle Prong of Little River, just above Walker Valley

Tremont is situated along the Middle Prong of Little River a few miles south of Townsend in Blount County, Tennessee. "Tremont" can refer to the former logging town of Tremont or the Great Smoky Mountains Institute at Tremont, but it generally applies to Middle Prong's entire watershed between Miry Ridge to the east and Defeat Ridge to the west. Both of these ridges run perpendicular to the main crest of the Great Smokies, which rises several thousand feet above Tremont to the south.

Middle Prong is formed by the confluence of Lynn Camp Prong, which flows down from the southeast, and Thunderhead Prong, which flows down from the southwest. From this junction, Middle Prong flows north for another 6 miles (9.7 km) to its mouth along Little River at an area known as the Townsend Y. About halfway between the Lynn Camp-Thunderhead junction and the Y, a narrow bottomland known as Walker Valley has been cut as Middle Prong absorbs several small streams flowing down from Meigs Mountain and Fodderstack Mountain. The Great Smoky Mountains Institute at Tremont is located in Walker Valley.

Tremont Road runs parallel to Middle Prong, and is paved from its intersection along Little River Road to the Institute at Walker Valley. A gravel road extends for another three miles (5 km) to a cul-de-sac and parking area at the Lynn Camp-Thunderhead junction. Along Little River Road, Cades Cove is approximately 7 miles (11 km) to the west and Elkmont is 13 miles (21 km) to the east.

== History ==
=== Early settlement ===
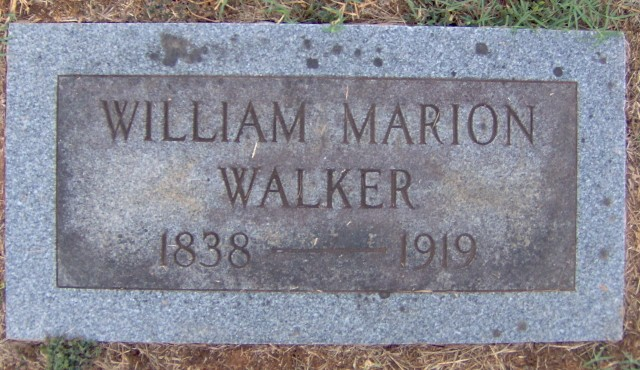
The grave of Will Walker at the Bethel Baptist Cemetery in Townsend

William Marion Walker (1838–1919), who was born in nearby Tuckaleechee Cove, and his first wife Nancy Caylor were the first known permanent settlers along Middle Prong. Walker arrived in the area around 1859 and settled in the valley that now bears his name. The Great Smokies Institute at Tremont is located on what was once Walker's house and immediate farmland.

Even in his own time, Walker was something of a legend. His sharpshooting skills were so well known, he was often barred from shooting contests. Walker kept over a hundred bee stands, which he robbed without the use of mask or smoke, and sold the honey in nearby Tuckaleechee. During the U.S. Civil War, he aided struggling families in Tuckaleechee by going from house to house to cut firewood and do basic chores.

While Walker was well liked and respected throughout the northwestern Smokies, he was always a source of controversy due to his practice of polygamy. Walker, who was very religious, believed that Biblical scripture allowed him to take more than one wife. In 1864, he married Mary Ann Moore and a few years later married a third wife, Mary Moll Stinnett. Walker eventually fathered a total of 26 children, although several died in infancy. He allowed tenant farmers to move into Walker Valley, and a small community developed. Walker constructed three gristmills to accommodate the growing community.

=== Early logging ===
As large-scale logging operations left much of the Eastern United States deforested by the late 19th century, logging companies turned to the remote virgin forests of Southern Appalachia to meet the nation's growing demand for timber. Taking advantage of recent band saw and logging railroad innovations, small logging firms began to spring up around the Great Smokies.

The first logging venture to reach Walker Valley and the Middle Prong area was that of John English, a Knoxville businessman whose company began cutting timber in nearby Tuckaleechee Cove in the early 1880s. English used a series of splash dams to move the logs down Little River to a mill on the outskirts of Knoxville. One such splash dam was located at the mouth of Spruce Flats along Middle Prong, just above Walker Valley. While English's lumbering venture turned a small profit, a flood along Little River apparently wiped out his splash dams in the late 1890s, and his venture had folded by 1900.

=== The Little River Lumber Company ===
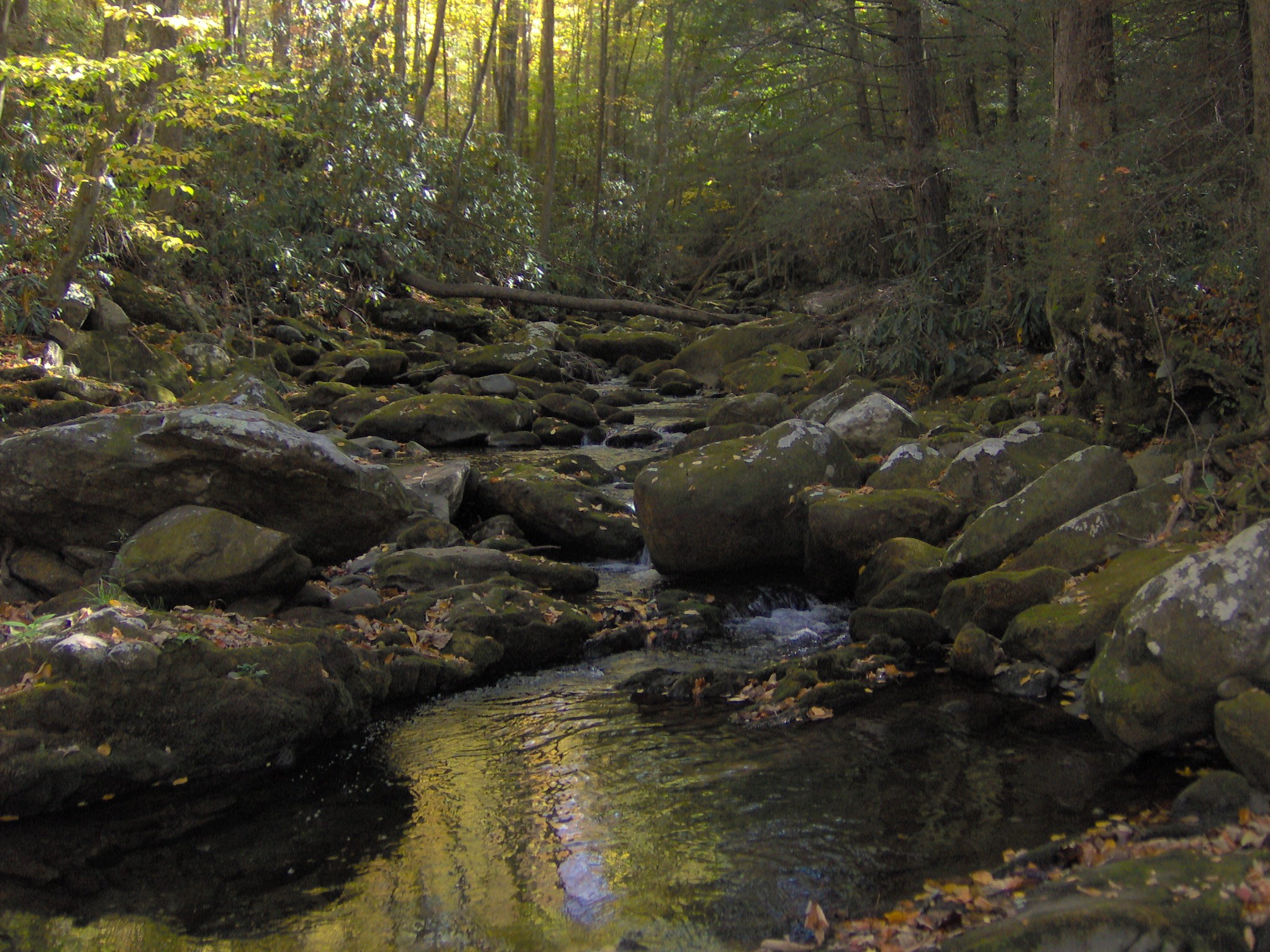
Thunderhead Prong

While Will Walker allowed English to build a splash dam and do minor logging in the Middle Prong watershed, he disliked the thought of large-scale logging operations mowing down his valley's virgin forests. In 1901, Colonel Wilson B. Townsend and several associates formed the Little River Lumber Company and bought up 86,000 acres (350 km^{2}) of land along Little River between Tuckaleechee and the river's source on the slopes of Kuwohi (formerly Clingmans Dome). Walker, however, refused to sell Middle Prong, forcing Townsend's operations eastward to what is now Elkmont.

Townsend set up a band saw mill in Tuckaleechee, and the town that bears his name grew up in the vicinity. He formed the Little River Railroad to connect the mill with the Southern Railroad terminal at nearby Walland, and with able engineers managed to lay railroad tracts all the way to the upper reaches of Little River and Jakes Creek.

In 1918, Walker suffered a stroke that left him largely incapacitated. On December 26 of that year, he finally agreed to sell Middle Prong to Little River Lumber after Townsend gave him his word that he wouldn't harvest trees along Thunderhead Prong. Six months later, Walker died after suffering a second stroke. On Townsend's orders, a small train carried Walker's coffin ceremoniously to the Bethel Baptist Cemetery in Tuckaleechee, where it rests today.

=== Tremont ===
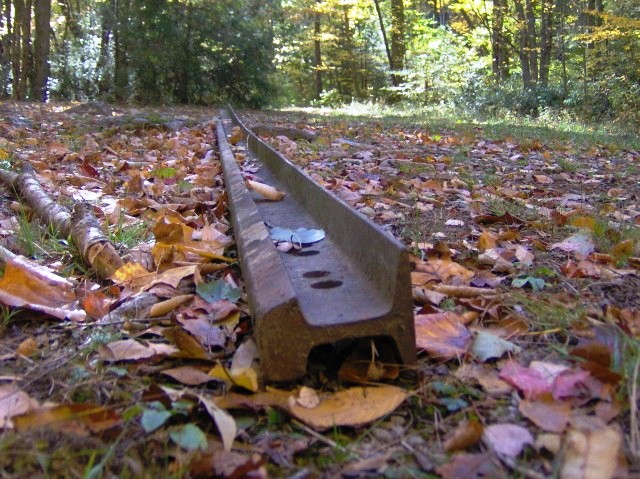
A stray railroad beam on the Middle Prong Trail

Although Townsend sold his Little River tract to the Great Smoky Mountains National Park Commission in 1926, he did so with the agreement that he could continue logging in the area for 15 years. After logging operations had ceased at Elkmont in 1925, Townsend ordered the tracks to be pulled up and moved to Middle Prong. A base for the Middle Prong operation was set up at the junction of Lynn Camp Prong and Thunderhead Prong. This base quickly grew into a small town, which was given the name Tremont, a combination of "tree" and "mountain."

While Tremont remained a base of operations, the logging camps moved further and further up Lynn Camp Prong as the operation progressed. These camps consisted of small shanty houses that could be loaded onto flatcars and moved from camp to camp. The base camp at Tremont consisted of a post office, hotel, maintenance sheds, a general store, and a community center that served as a church, school, and movie theater.

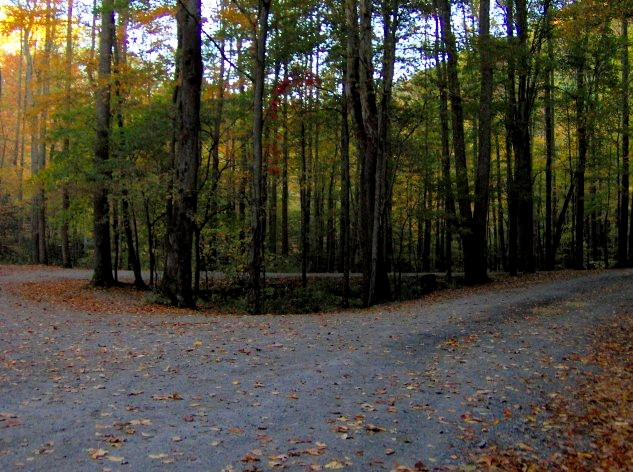
The former town of Tremont is now a parking lot for the Middle Prong Trail

Dora Cope, who lived at Tremont in the late 1920s and 1930s, later recalled various aspects of life in the logging camps. Cope remembered the camps being infested with rats and vulnerable to fires and the unpredictable weather of the Smokies. Cope spoke of Middle Prong as a "crystal playground" that was serene and calm on a typical day, but could change quickly with heavy rainfall:

...sometimes without warning, a heavy thunderstorm high on the mountain changed it into a roaring, tearing monster. At night, after a storm, we could hear the giant rocks being pushed and crushed together by its force. Trees, loosened by the flood, crashed into the water to be swept downstream.

As with Elkmont to the east, Townsend sought to promote the Tremont area as a summer resort. The Tremont Hotel opened in 1926 to provide housing for loggers and transients, but as the camps moved further up the valley, the hotel was opened up to tourists. The hotels at both Elkmont and Tremont developed a reputation as licentious places among the mountain people, as Cope recalled:

The rumors and stories of what went on in the hotels kept the natives entertained. Some thought of them as the Sodom and Gomorrah of the mountains. A few local girls were employed as maids at both hotels. Pretty, young daughters were warned to stay away from the places.

Townsend had promised Will Walker that Thunderhead Prong would not be cut, a promise he kept until his death in 1935. With Townsend out of the way, however, the Little River Lumber Company proceeded to harvest Thunderhead Prong. In December 1938, the last trees were cut in the Tremont area.

=== The National Park ===
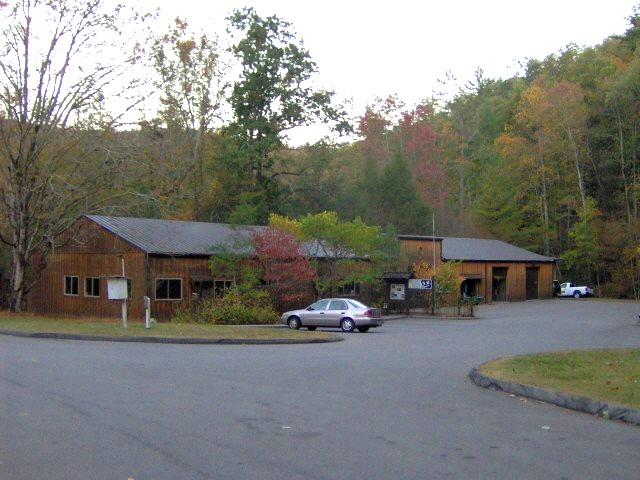
The visitor center of the Great Smoky Mountains Institute at Tremont

While the logging operations provided an economic boost to the northwestern Smokies, the rapid deforestation of Little River's watershed proved devastating for the river's ecosystem. With the formation of the Great Smoky Mountains National Park in 1934 and the end of logging operations in 1938, however, the forest quickly regrew. The Civilian Conservation Corps converted Little River Railroad's railroad beds into roads and trails. Today, other than the occasional stray skidder cable or railroad tie, there is little immediate evidence that logging ever took place in the area.

In 1969, Maryville College, with the help of the National Park Service, established the Tremont Environmental Education Center at the site of a former Job Corps center in Walker Valley. The purpose of the center was to provide a first-hand approach to understanding the environment and ecology of the mountains. In the early 1970s, the center hosted the Youth Conservation Corps during the summer. In 1980, the Great Smoky Mountains Natural History Association assumed control of the education center, and in 1985 the name was changed to the Great Smoky Mountains Institute at Tremont to further acknowledge its ties to the park. In 2014, Great Smoky Mountains Institute at Tremont renewed its partnership with Maryville College.

== See also ==
- Townsend, Tennessee
- Elkmont, Tennessee
