= Rob Carter =

American academic (born 1949)

Rob Carter (born 1949) is an American professor of typography and graphic design at Virginia Commonwealth University.

== Personal information ==
Rob Carter was born in 1949 in Salt Lake City, Utah, USA. He lives and works in Richmond, Virginia, USA.

== Residencies and awards ==
Carter has received numerous awards for his work from organizations such as the American Institute of Graphic Arts, New York Type Directors Club, Society of Typographic Arts, Creativity, and Print regional annual.

== Bibliography ==
- American Typography Today, Rob Carter (1989)
- Working with Type five-volume series
- Typographic Specimens: The Great Typefaces, Philip B. Meggs, Rob Carter (1993)
- Meggs: making graphic design history, Philip B. Meggs, Rob Carter, Libby Phillips Meggs, Sandy Wheeler (2007)
- Digital Colour and Type, Typographic Design: Form And Communication, Rob Carter, Philip B. Meggs, Ben Day, Sandra Maxa, Mark Sanders (2014). ISBN 0-471-38341-4
