= Meigs, Ohio =

Unincorporated community in Ohio, U.S.

Coordinates: 39°41′26″N 81°46′31″W

Meigs is an unincorporated community in Morgan County, in the U.S. state of Ohio.

== History ==
A post office called Meigs Center was established in 1830, the name was changed to Meigs in 1894, and the post office closed in 1914. The community has the name of Return J. Meigs Jr., 4th Governor of Ohio.
