= Return Meigs =

Return Meigs may refer to:

- Return J. Meigs Sr. (1740–1823), American Revolutionary War officer, federal Indian agent
- Return J. Meigs Jr., (1764–1825), Governor of Ohio, U.S. Postmaster General
