= William Joel Meggs =

American physician

William Joel Meggs (born 1942) is a board-certified internal medicine and emergency medicine physician, allergist and immunologist, and medical toxicologist with "interests in envenomations, antidotes, and environmental toxicology. Meggs currently practices in Greenville, NC, where he is a professor of Emergency Medicine and Director of the Division of Toxicology and at the Brody School of Medicine at East Carolina University. His contributions to research have been recognized by his receiving the American College of Medical Toxicology 2010 award for outstanding contributions to toxicology research. He has been awarded fellowship status by the American College of Emergency Medicine and American College of Medical Toxicology for his contributions to advancing knowledge in these fields.

== Biography ==
Meggs was born on May 30, 1942, in Newberry, South Carolina, to Wallace Nat Meggs and Elizabeth Pruitt Meggs. He had a twin brother, Philip B. Meggs as well as a sister, Elizabeth "Beth" Lever (nee Elizabeth Pruitt Meggs).

After being raised in Newberry, South Carolina, he then attended Clemson University where he obtained a BS in Physics and subsequently completed a PhD in physics at Syracuse University. He was a research physicist at the University of Rochester from 1969–1971 and at McGill University in Montreal, Canada from 1971-1977.

Meggs departed from academic physics to pursue medicine afterward, and achieved a Doctorate of Medicine from the University of Miami in 1979. He then completed an Internal Medicine residency at Rochester General Hospital in 1982. Meggs then served as a Medical Staff Fellow at the National Institute of Allergy and Infectious Disease at the National Institutes of Health from 1982-1985. He obtained board certification in Emergency Medicine in 1988. While his career path has been varied, Meggs' main contributions to medicine have been in the arenas of Emergency Medicine and Medical Toxicology. Since 1991, Meggs has been affiliated with the Emergency Department at Vidant Medical Center, in Greenville, North Carolina, which is the flagship teaching hospital for the Brody School of Medicine at East Carolina University. During his first few years with the PCMH Emergency Department, Meggs successfully completed a fellowship in Medical Toxicology at the New York City Poison Center and Department of Emergency Medicine, Bellevue Hospital Center, affiliated with New York University. He currently serves as professor and chief of the Toxicology Department of the ECU Emergency Medicine Residency program.

Meggs has published more than 60 articles in referred journals of toxicology and Emergency Medicine. His main research interests include antidotes to poisonings, poisonous snakebites, toxicity of pharmaceutical overdoses, effects of chronic low level exposures to pesticides, environmental factors in obesity, and the role of inflammation in overall health.

His expertise has led to the total or partial authorships of three books: Gulf War illness and the Health of Gulf War Veterans: Scientific Findings and Recommendations, The Inflammation Cure, and Biomarkers of Immunotoxicity. Meggs' book, The Inflammation Cure, which was released around the same time as Jack Challem's, The Inflammation Syndrome, won critical acclaim from the prestigious Library Journal who stated:

"While Jack Challem's The Inflammation Syndrome covers similar ground [to the Inflammation Cure], his approach leans toward the faddish and sensationalist, while Meggs takes a more levelheaded approach, weaving the latest research on various diseases into a broad picture."

In 2010, Meggs was presented with American College of Medical Toxicology Award for Outstanding Contribution to Medical Toxicology Research for "contributions to medicine and science that have showed innovation and creativity in medical toxicology and related areas of study. His broad range of research has included investigating intracellular molecular polarity modeling; discovering and defining RUDS and inflammatory syndromes; establishing a link between organophosphate exposures and obesity; evaluating the anecdotal effect of heparin to teat anaphylactoid shock; and the best way to delay onset toxicity from potentially fatal snakebites."

His twin brother, Philip B. Meggs, is a graphic design historian and author who wrote A History of Graphic Design, which is a commonly used textbook for the profession.

His theory of biological homing demonstrates a mechanism for a long range quantum mechanical force between complimentary biological molecules that provides a motive force for biological processes. (reference Meggs WJ. Biological homing: Hypothesis for a quantum effect that leads to the existence of life. Medical Hypotheses 1998;51:503.506.).
