= Meiggs =

Meiggs may refer to:

- Henry Meiggs (1811-1877), American promoter/entrepreneur and railroad builder
- Russell Meiggs (1902-1989), British ancient historian
- Meiggs Wharf, former wooden pier in San Francisco, California, United States

== See also ==
- Meigs (disambiguation)
- Meggs (disambiguation)
