= Meigs School =

Meigs Magnet Middle Prep

Location
- 713 Ramsey St. Nashville, Tennessee 37206; United States
- Coordinates: 36.1763°N 86.7607°W

Information
- Type: Public
- Established: 1867
- Locale: East Nashville
- Principal: Dr. Neal
- Teaching staff: 33.75 (FTE)
- Grades: 6-8
- Enrollment: 693 (2022-2023)
- Student to teacher ratio: 20.53

Meigs School (or currently Meigs Academic Magnet Middle Prep) is a public magnet school located in Nashville, Tennessee.

== History ==
The school is named in honor of James L. Meigs, Nashville's second superintendent of public schools. In a report by Superintendent Caldwell in 1880-1881 he shared that, "at least 150 Black students had been refused permission to enter a school because there was no room for them. In 1881, the Nashville Board of Education appropriated funds for two new public schools for Black Students: Pearl and Meigs Schools, both built in the same two-story brick plan". Kizziah J. Bills, a Black suffragist, worked at Meigs School in the 1891-1892 school year.

Meigs School opened as a grammar school in the fall of 1883 on Georgia Street and could accommodate 600 students. Robert S. White, a Black man with three years teaching experience, served as Meigs' first principal. Enrollment at Meigs in the 1883-1884 school year totaled 397 primary and intermediate pupils. Four teachers assisted the principal.

By 1884, many African Americans were elected to reconstruction legislatures in the south and "must be credited with making public education available to both poor whites and blacks." Even with Meigs (still a grammar school), students had no place to obtain an education beyond eighth grade. Because of this J.C. Napier (a Black lawyer), brought a resolution to the City Council on September 25, 1884, to obtain a high school by the 1886 school term; however, by the fall of 1886, no high school was established.

Not having a high school for the Black children became an issue when "Mrs. Sandy Porter in an effort to further the education of her son James Rice Porter who had finished 8th grade and was ready for high school. When the 1886 school term started, she sent her son to the Fogg High School. His arrival there started quite a sensation and he was instructed to return home, as the school was not for him". His mother sent him back for the next few days, and he was refused. Other black students were encouraged by Porter's efforts to try the same and were also refused. On the consequence of their refusal, a meeting was held September 14, 1886, drawing attention to the scholars who had been excluded. A resolution was created and read:

"At the present session of the City public schools, many colored youths who applied for admission to the 9th grade were rejected, being told that the Board of Education and City Council were unable to make the necessary arrangements. There were no temporary or permanent high school facilities in Nashville for these rejected students, as the law directed... It would be high and noble compliance on the part of the city to as speedily as possible consummate permanent high school facilities for the present and rapidly growing class of colored youth who are passing beyond the present school grades and who for the lack of which are forced to close their school lives much earlier than at first contemplated... A petition be circulated among all colored people and their friends for signatures asking the City Council for the necessary approbation for the above purpose"

The notice of the follow-up was inserted in the daily papers on September 16, 1886, and asked for inter-racial effort, saying: "All citizens, both white and colored, who are interested in promoting the educational interests of the youth of the city are earnestly and cordially requested to meet at the Spruce Street Baptist Church on Friday evening September 17th to take further steps by endorsing the object and action of the meeting held at the Clark Chapel Tuesday night, toward securing the high-grades in the colored public schools which they are now deprived of". In September 1886, Superintendent S.Y. Caldwell reported that by shifting some classes the "excluded 9th and 10th grades, colored, can accommodated in Meigs School" which "was not taxed to its full capacity and would consequently accommodate some more pupils," and could be given since D.N. Crosthwait, a principal at Meigs School, since he was a college graduate and capable of handling those grades.

Students began school September 20, 1886, at 8 am. Students demanded to use the same subjects and textbooks that white students at Fogg High School used as they desire an equivalent education of their white counterparts.

In 1898, high school classes were moved from Meigs to Pearl, creating one centrally located high school for Black Students. Upon completion of 8th grade at Meigs School, students were transferred to Cameron Junior High School for 9th grade, and then on to Pearl Senior High for the 10th, 11th, and 12th grades. March 15, 1933, Meigs was destroyed by a tornado. Students had no school for several days due to the storm because it was the only Black school in East Nashville. They attended school in the sanctuary of First Baptist Church of East Nashville until their new building was complete in 1934.

From 1934–1959 it remained a grammar school. In 1959–1969, the school once again became a high school, but was closed in order to follow desegregation orders. In 1969, the school graduated its last senior class and phased out the elementary school as well. In 1970, Meigs became a junior high school. 1983 it became a magnet school- one of three magnet schools in the Metropolitan Nashville Public Schools system in order to continue Nashville desegregation efforts.

== Distinctions ==
Meigs Magnet Middle Prep was recognized by the Department of Education as a Blue Ribbon School in 2013.
