= Philip B. Meggs =

American graphic designer and author

Philip Baxter Meggs (30 May 1942 – 24 November 2002) was an American graphic designer, professor, historian and author of books on graphic design. His book History of Graphic Design is a definitive, standard read for the study of graphic design.

He has been called the most important historian of design since Nikolaus Pevsner (1902-1983). In contrast to Pevsner, he published a history of graphic design that went beyond the nineteenth and twentieth centuries. One of the first educators to create an overview of the history of graphic design that did not depend exclusively on the traditional structure of the history of the art, Meggs believed that graphic design would need to acquire an adequate understanding of the past and its relation with art.

== Life and early career ==
Meggs was born on May 30, 1942, in Newberry, South Carolina, to Wallace Nat Meggs and Elizabeth Pruitt Meggs. He had a twin brother, William Joel Meggs as well as a sister, Elizabeth "Beth" Lever (nee Elizabeth Pruitt Meggs).

At 16 years of age he practiced typesetting metal type in the afternoons after school and enjoyed drawing and painting.

He received a Bachelor of Fine Arts degree in 1964 and a Master of Fine Arts degree in 1971, both from Virginia Commonwealth University (VCU). He also received an honorary doctorate from Massachusetts College of Art.

In 1964 he married his college girlfriend, Libby Phillips, an art director and illustrator. They had two children, Andrew and Elizabeth.

== Career ==
Post-college, Meggs worked as a senior designer at Reynolds Metals and then art director at A.H. Robins Pharmaceuticals.

In 1968, he began teaching in the Communication Arts and Design Department at Virginia Commonwealth University, chairing the department from 1974 to 1987, during which time enrollment doubled and the program rose to national prominence. In the late 1970s, Meggs used a grant from the National Endowment for the Arts to travel to other institutions and teach the history of visual communication in an effort to promote the subject. In addition to his teaching at VCU, he served as visiting faculty at Syracuse University and the National College of Art and Design, Dublin.

Inspired by a lack of research and instructive materials on design history, theory and creative methods, Meggs started teaching a history of graphic design course in 1974. His efforts to record and understand the history of this profession lead him to publish his first book, A History of Graphic Design, in 1983. The core subject matter of the book drew on the histories of two intellectual traditions, graphic arts and visual communication.

While a professor at VCU he authored more than a dozen books and 150 articles and papers on design and typography, including a section on graphic design in the Encyclopædia Britannica. Meggs attended many conferences and was said by Steven Heller to have "built a monument to graphic design's legacy." He was inducted into the Art Directors Club Hall of Fame and received its Educator's Award for lifetime achievement and significantly shaping the future of the fields of graphic design education and writing.

He died after a long battle with leukemia on November 24, 2002, at the age of 60 and was buried at Dale Memorial Cemetery in Richmond, Virginia.

== Awards ==
- 1983 — Association of American Publishers: excellence in publishing
- 1995 — VCU: Award for Excellence in Teaching, Research, and Service
- 2004 — AIGA: Medalist

== Selected bibliography ==
- 1983 A History of Graphic Design. (1st edition) Van Nostrand Reinhold
- 1991 A History of Graphic Design. (2nd edition) Van Nostrand Reinhold
- 1992 Type and Image: The Language of Graphic Design. Van Nostrand Reinhold
- 1993 Typographic Design: Form and Communication. for Philip B. Meggs and Rob Carter ISBN 0-442-00758-2
- 1998 A History of Graphic Design. (3rd edition) John Wiley & Sons ISBN 978-0-471-29198-5
- 2005 Meggs' History of Graphic Design. (4th edition) Ed. Wiley. Revised by Alston W. Purvis
- 2011 Meggs' History of Graphic Design (5th edition) John Wiley & Sons Revised by Alston W. Purvis, ISBN 9780470168738
- 2016 Meggs' History of Graphic Design (6th edition) Revised by Alston W. Purvis, ISBN 9781118772058

== See also ==
- List of AIGA medalists
