= MEGG =

American singer-songwriter (born 1991)

MEGG (Meghan Mahowald)
- Born: Meghan Elisse Mahowald; February 7, 1991 (age 34); Redondo Beach, California, U.S.
- Genres: Pop rock, pop
- Occupation(s): Singer, songwriter, musician
- Instrument(s): Vocals, guitar, piano
- Years active: 2006–present

Meghan Elisse Mahowald (born February 7, 1991), known professionally as MEGG, is an American singer, songwriter, and musician based in Los Angeles, California. She is best known as the pop rock act MEGG, which is also the name of her band. She was a former member of the all-girl pop group Runway MMC.

== Early life and education ==
Born and raised in Redondo Beach, California, Mahowald has been singing and writing music since she was eight years old. She attended the Los Angeles County High School for the Arts (LACHSA), where she starred in musical performances such as Les Misérables and Annie.

Upon graduating from high school, Mahowald was accepted to the Popular Music Program at the USC Thornton School of Music. While attending USC, MEGG has performed at many school concerts and events.

== Career ==
=== Runway MMC ===
From 2006 to 2008, Mahowald was a member of the all-girl pop act Runway MMC. The group, which also featured Chelsea Tavares and Melody Hernandez, released their EP Forever Yours on iTunes in October 2008, as well as a corresponding clothing line which was sold by Wet Seal.

== Discography ==
=== Extended plays ===
- Forever Yours (2008)
- The EP (2010)
- Low Life Club (2025)
