= Meigs Mountain Trail =

Hiking trail in Tennessee, United States

Coordinates: 35.6478°N 83.6101°W

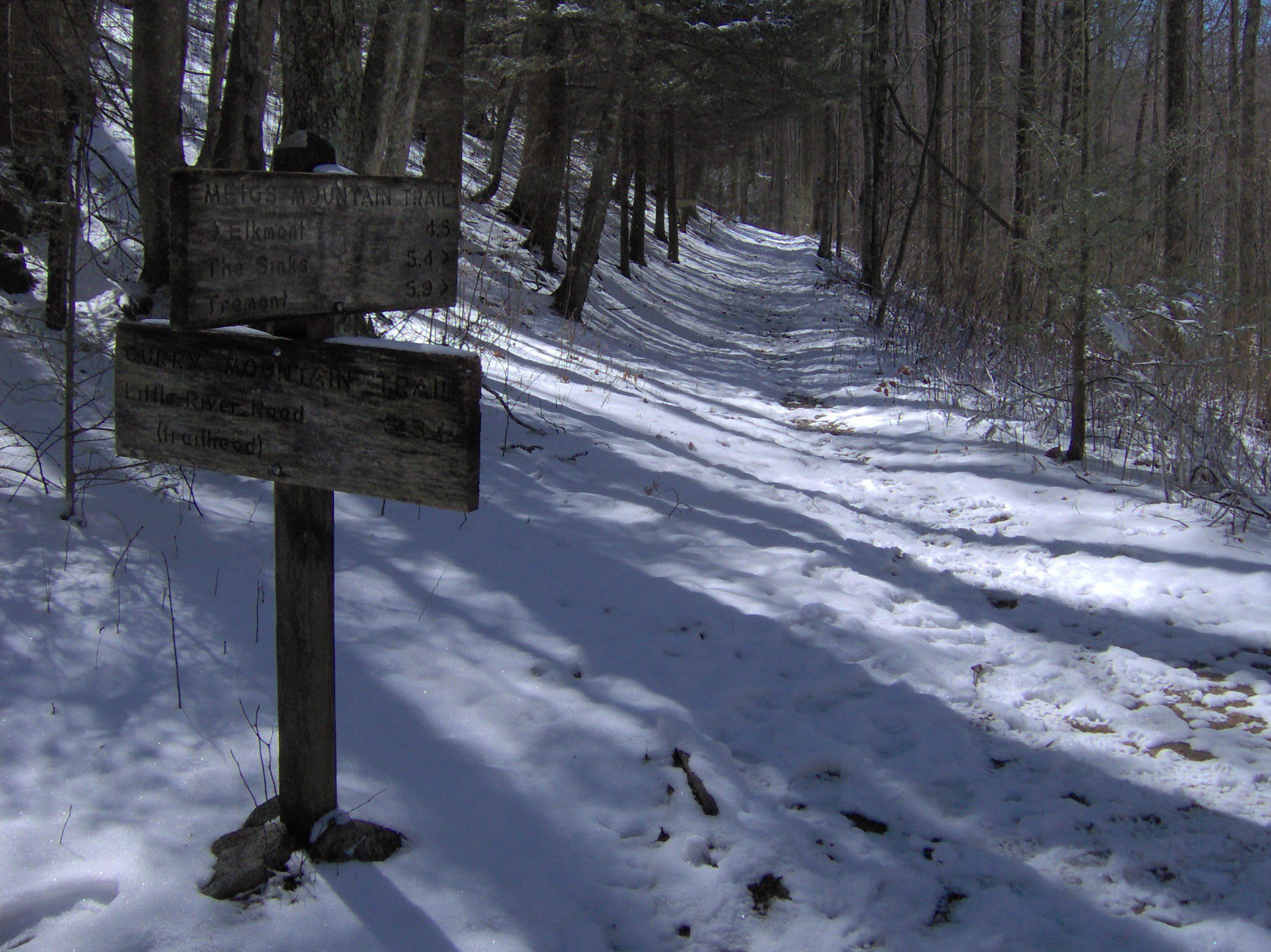
- The Meigs Mountain Trail at the Curry Mountain Trail junction
- Length: 6 mi (9.7 km)
- Location: Great Smoky Mountains National Park, Tennessee, United States
- Trailheads: Junction with the Jakes Creek Trail just south of Elkmont; Junction with the Lumber Ridge Trail and Meigs Creek Trail at Buckhorn Gap. Meigs Creek Trail trailhead starts at the Sinks.
- Use: Hiking
- Highest point: Near Campsite 19, 2,880 ft (880 m)
- Lowest point: Buckhorn Gap, 2,400 ft (730 m)
- Difficulty: Moderate
- Season: Open year-round
- Hazards: Multiple stream crossings

The Meigs Mountain Trail is an American hiking trail in the Great Smoky Mountains National Park of Sevier County, Tennessee. The trail traverses the northern slopes of Meigs Mountain in the northwest section of the park, connecting Jakes Creek in the Elkmont area with Lumber Ridge in the Tremont area. The Meigs Mountain Trail, when joined with the 4.1-mile (6.6 km) Lumber Ridge Trail and the first 0.4 miles (0.64 km) of the Jakes Creek Trail, is part of a 10.5-mile (16.9 km) continuous path connecting the Appalachian Club section of Elkmont with the Great Smoky Mountains Institute at Tremont. In the early 20th century, the logging communities that formed at Elkmont and Tremont branched out across the relatively broad northern slopes of Meigs Mountain. Other than a crude mountain cemetery, the occasional detritus, and a few rock walls, however, very little remains of the mountain's former inhabitants.

The nearest parking lot for the Meigs Mountain Trail is the Jakes Creek Trailhead parking lot, located at the end of Elkmont Road. The Curry Mountain Trail and the Meigs Creek Trail both connect the Meigs Mountain Trail to Little River Road.

== Vital information ==
- The parking lot at the Jakes Creek Trailhead is very small and fills up quickly in the warmer months.
- Backcountry Campsite 20 is approximately 1.9 miles (3.1 km) from the Meigs Mountain Trailhead (2.3 miles from the nearest parking lot); Backcountry Campsite 19 is approximately 4.5 miles (7.2 km) from the trailhead.
- The Meigs Mountain Trail crosses nearly a dozen small mountain streams, the most substantial being Jakes Creek and Blanket Creek. While there is a footbridge at Jakes Creek, the other streams must be forded. These streams are normally minor trickles less than a foot deep at the trail crossing, but can quickly swell beyond their normal volume after heavy rain or snow.

== Landmarks/overlooks ==
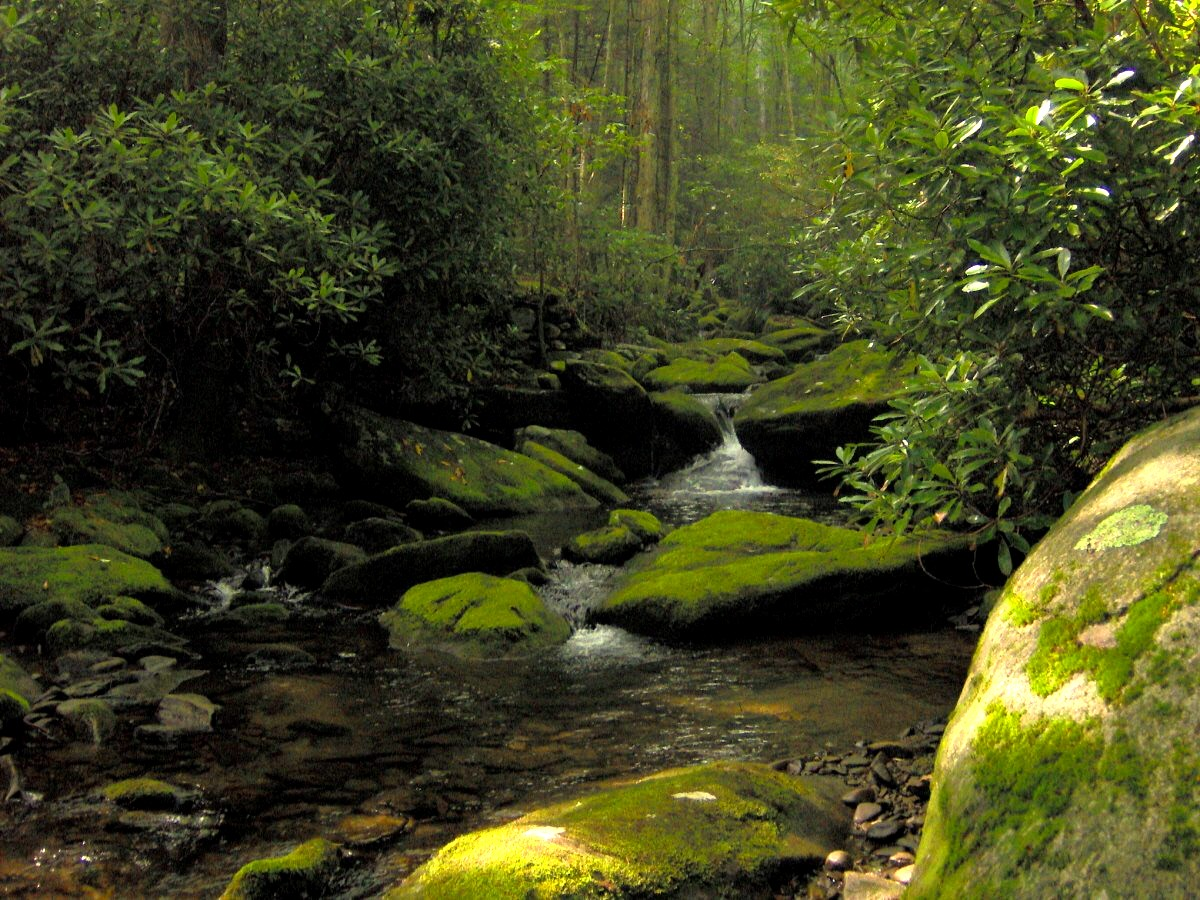
Jakes Creek

- Jakes Creek Trail/Meigs Creek Trail junction (0.0 miles)
- NPS corral at the old Lem Ownby homesite (0.2 miles)
- Deteriorating rock walls, detritus (0.5 miles)
- Deteriorating rock walls (1–2 miles)
- Backcountry Campsite 20 (1.9 miles)
- Blanket Creek and mill rubbish (2 miles)
- Mannis Branch headwater streams (between miles 3 and 4)
- Meigs Mountain Trail/Curry Mountain Trail junction (4.1 miles)
- Henderson homesite ruins (4.2 miles)
- Meigs Mountain Cemetery (4.3 miles)
- Backcountry Campsite 19 (4.5 miles)
- Trailfork with Lumber Ridge Trail and Meigs Creek Trail (6.0 miles)

== Geographical and natural information ==
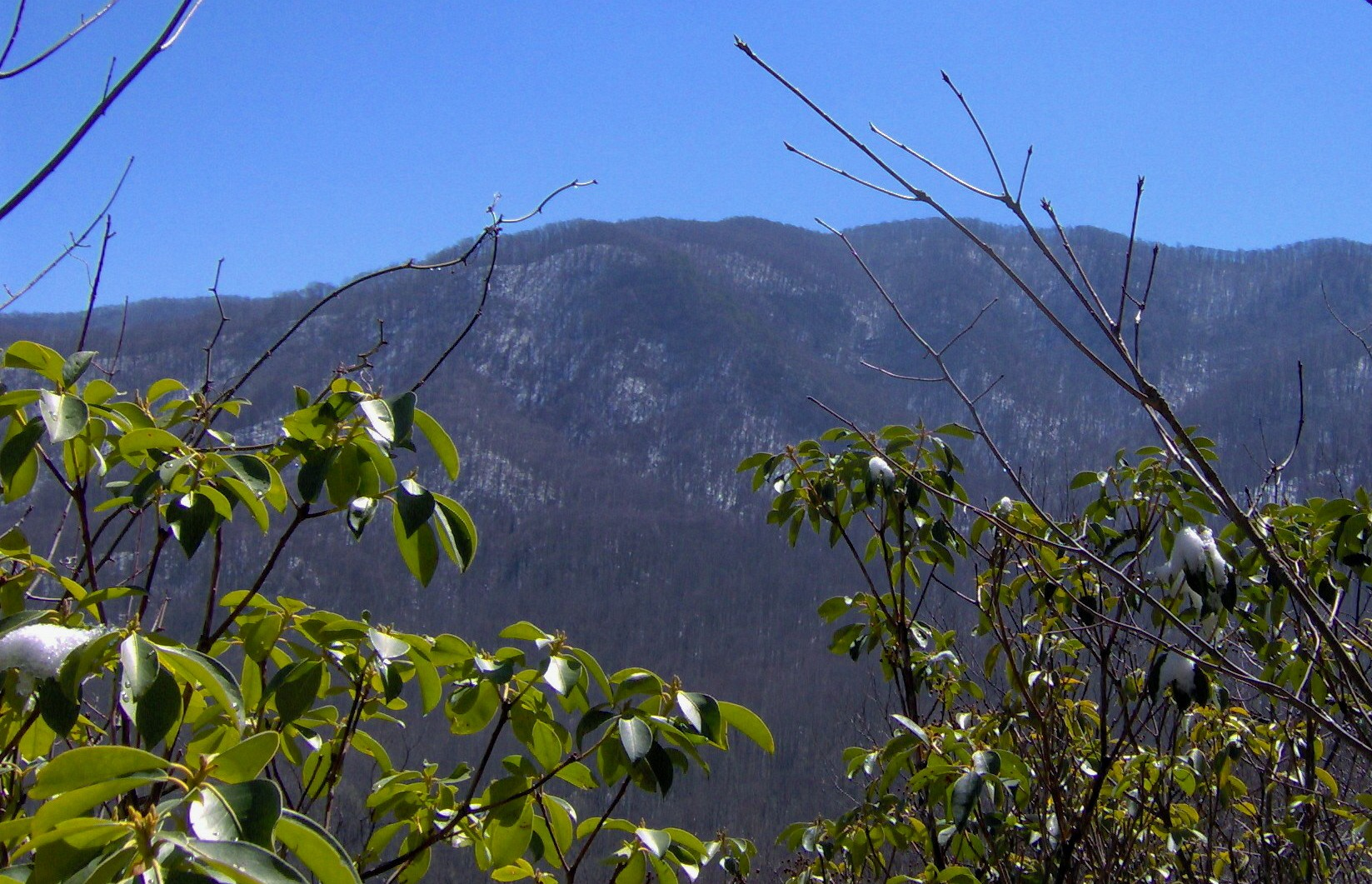
Meigs Mountain, looking south from the Curry Mountain Trail

Meigs Mountain is a ridge stretching for roughly 5 miles (8.0 km) between Blanket Creek to the east and the Middle Prong of Little River to the west. To the southeast, Meigs Mountain is flanked by Blanket Mountain, which culminates in a prominent 4,607-foot (1,404 m) summit. To the north, three low mountains are "wedged" between Meigs Mountain and the Little River Gorge— Curry She Mountain to the northeast, Curry He Mountain to the north, and Lumber Ridge to the northwest. The 3,982-foot (1,214 m) summit of Meigs Mountain is located on the mountain's eastern end, with the elevation decreasing gradually to the west and sharply to the north and south.

Geologically, Meigs Mountain is composed of Precambrian rocks (primarily sandstone) of the Ocoee Supergroup, formed from ancient ocean sediments nearly a billion years ago. Rock exposures are not very common along the Meigs Mountain Trail, although the trail crosses multiple steambeds littered with rocks and small boulders. The streams that drain Meigs Mountain are part of the Little River watershed.

Meigs Mountain is covered by a mature second-growth deciduous forest. Most of the mountain's commercial timber was removed by the various logging operations that occurred on the mountain in the late 19th and early 20th centuries. Hemlock, magnolia, sourwood, tulip trees, and silverbell trees are among the most common tree types encountered along the Meigs Mountain Trail.

== Historical information ==
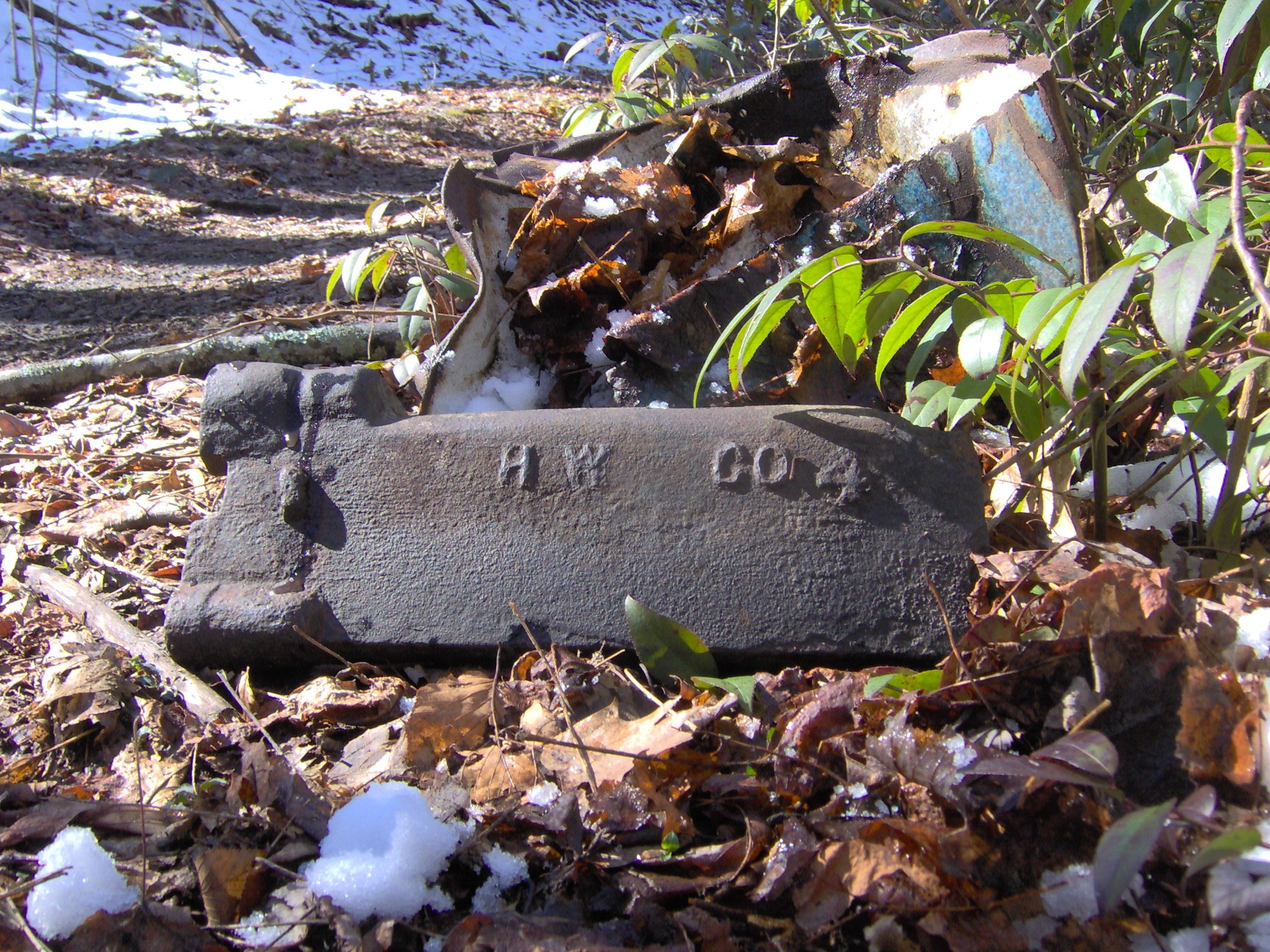
Rusted machine parts and other detritus from the early 20th century are occasionally encountered along the Meigs Mountain Trail

Meigs Mountain is named after Colonel Return Jonathan Meigs (1740–1823), a Revolutionary War veteran who began a re-survey of the last nine miles of the Hawkins Line (the crude early border between Tennessee and North Carolina) from atop this mountain in 1802. Meigs supposedly hung a brightly colored blanket atop the adjacent mountain (which was subsequently known as "Blanket Mountain") for use as a compass reference point.

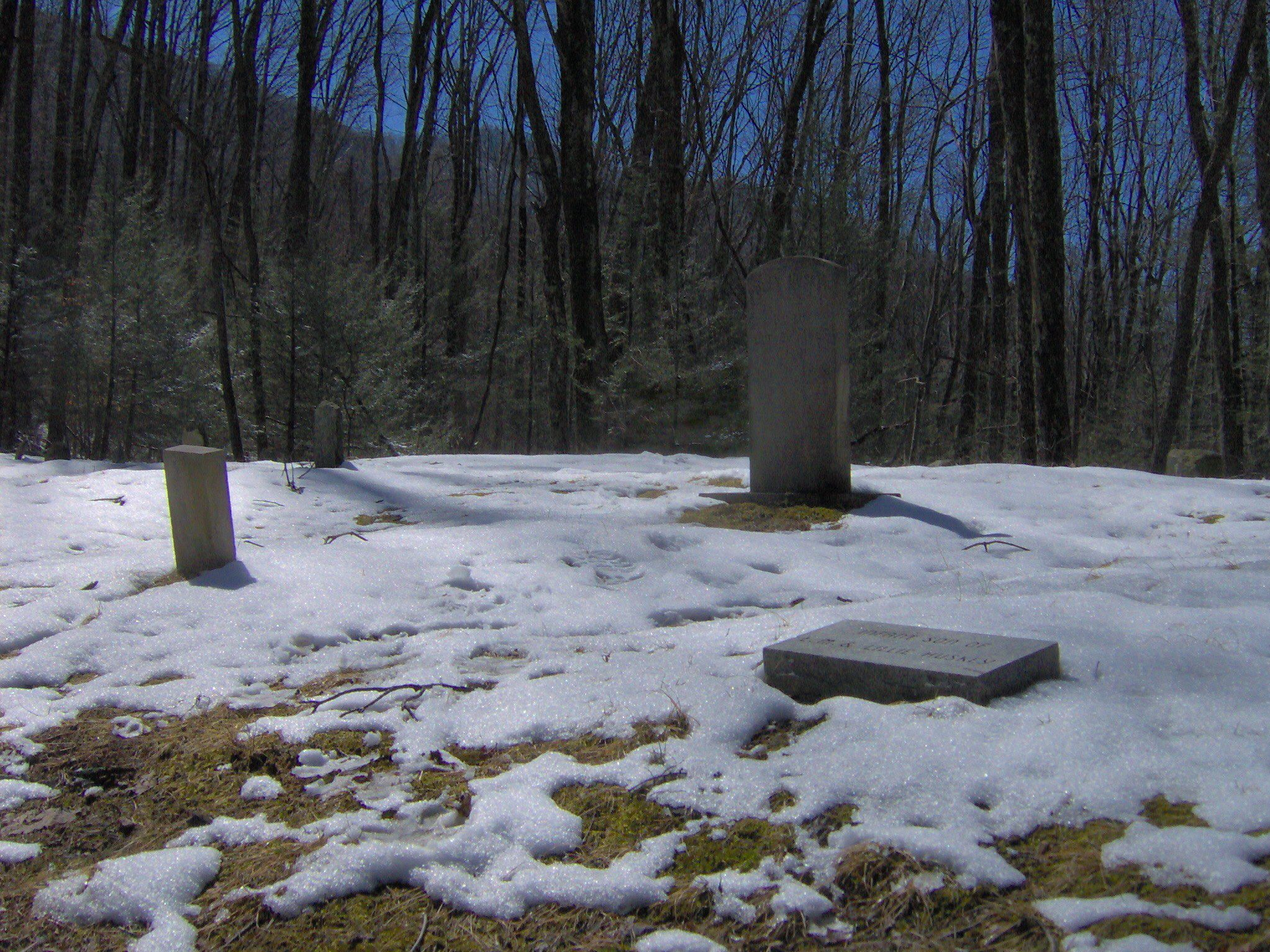
Meigs Mountain Cemetery

Extensive logging operations on Meigs Mountain began in the 1880s with Knoxville-based entrepreneur John L. English. English selectively logged Blanket Creek for cherry and basswood and moved the logs downstream to a mill in Blount County using a series of splash dams. Although English's operations ceased in the late 1890s after a flood washed away his splash dams, small-scale selective logging continued until the arrival of the Little River Lumber Company around 1908.

Between 1908 and 1939, the Little River Lumber Company removed most of Meigs Mountain's commercial timber. The company built two large band saw mills in Townsend and connected the mills to the Elkmont area via the Little River Railroad. Incline railways were used to reach the trees on steeper slopes, including those along Blanket Creek.

In the early 20th century, the various logging operations led to the development of a small community along what is now the Meigs Mountain Trail. Members of the Huskey and Henderson families lived in the vicinity of the Meigs Mountain Trail/Curry Mountain Trail junction, some of whom are buried in a crude cemetery just southwest of this junction. The Meigs Mountain schoolhouse was also located at this trail junction, although no part of it remains. What is now Backcountry Campsite 19 was once the homesite of Andy Brackin (1888–1924), whose sister and brother-in-law ran a boarding house for loggers at Elkmont. Legendary mountaineer Lem Ownby (1889–1984) lived along Jakes Creek at the Meigs Mountain Trail/Jakes Creek Trail junction until his death in 1984. He was the last of the park's permanent residents outside of Cades Cove.

== Trail synopsis ==
=== Jakes Creek to Curry Mountain Trail Junction — 4.1 miles ===
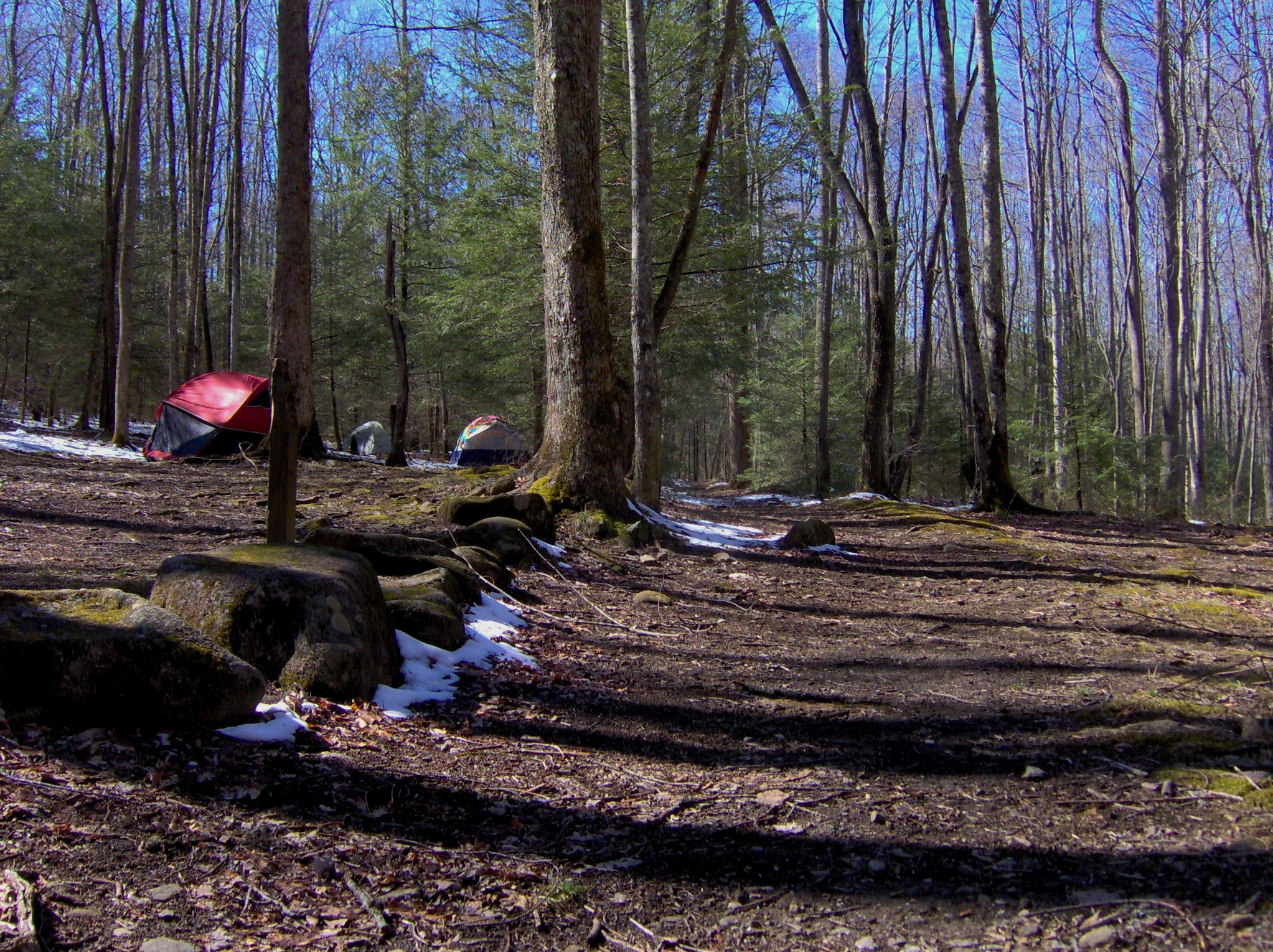
The Meigs Mountain Trail passing through Campsite 20

After leaving the Jakes Creek Trail, the Meigs Mountain Trail descends immediately to Jakes Creek, where it crosses a log footbridge to what was once the Lem Ownby homesite. Little remains of Ownby's home, although a National Park Service corral stands in what was once Ownby's pasture nearby. From Jakes Creek, the trail ascends the lower northern slopes of Blanket Mountain, passing the occasional rock pile before descending to the relatively broad upper Blanket Creek Valley and Backcountry Campsite 20.

Campsite 20 is flanked by two small streams to the east and Kiver Branch and Blanket Creek to the west. The campsite, which occupies a broad, flat slope at the northern base of Blanket Mountain, is relatively large compared to other backcountry campsites in the park. Mechanical detritus from the early 20th century is scattered around Blanket Creek, and the remnants of a stone wall is visible immediately downstream from the trail.

After crossing Blanket Creek, the Meigs Mountain Trail begins to ascend Meigs Mountain. Just beyond the creek, the trail traverses another broad section of former homesites. As the trail enters the headwaters of Sugar Maple Branch, however, the mountain gradually grows steeper. After winding its way through the various streams that comprise the headwaters of Mannis Branch, the trail arrives at the Curry Mountain Trail junction. The Curry Mountain Trail connects the Meigs Mountain Trail to the Metcalf Bottoms area of Little River Road.

=== Curry Mountain Trail junction to Buckhorn Gap — 1.9 miles ===
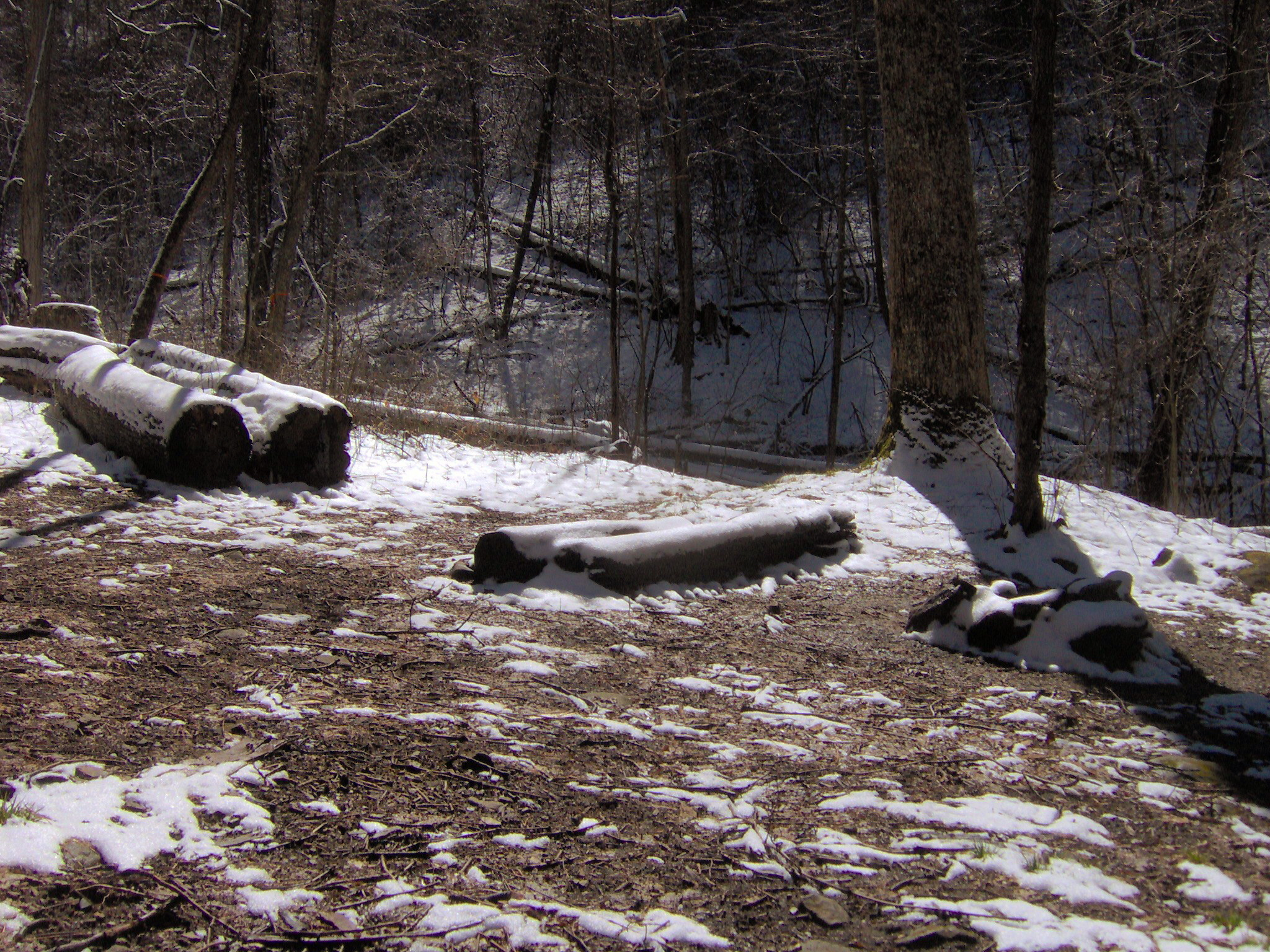
Backcountry Campsite 19

Southwest of the Meigs Mountain Trail/Curry Mountain Trail junction, a pile of logs and stones comprise the remains of the Henderson homesite. The Meigs Mountain Cemetery is situated atop a hill immediately west of the homesite. Like many mountain cemeteries, most of the graves are marked only by upright stones. Polished markers mark the graves of Polly Huskey (1866–1909) and an infant Huskey. The name "Noah Ownby" is scratched into one of the crude markers.

Beyond the cemetery, the trail continues to gradually ascend to Backcountry Campsite 19. A headwater stream of Henderson Prong has sliced a deep gully in the western half of the campsite, providing its water source. The campsite is littered with sawed logs and stones blackened from campfires.

Just past Campsite 19, the Meigs Mountain Trail gradually descends to Upper Buckhorn Gap, where an unmaintained spur branches off from the Meigs Mountain Trail and winds its way southward along the mountain's remote eastern slope. The Meigs Mountain Trail, however, veers northwest and descends to Buckhorn Gap, where it terminates at a trailfork. From the trailfork, the Lumber Ridge Trail continues westward for another 4.1 miles (6.6 km) to the Great Smokies Institute at Tremont, and the Meigs Creek Trail continues northward for 3.5 miles (5.6 km) to the "Sinks" area of the Little River Gorge.
