= Great Smoky Mountains Parkway =

Highway in Tennessee, United States

Route information
- Maintained by TDOT and NPS
- Length: 23.04 mi (37.08 km)
- Component highways: US 441 / SR 71 Gatlinburg–Sevierville; SR 73 Scenic Gatlinburg; US 321 / SR 73 Gatlinburg–Pigeon Forge; SR 448 Sevierville; SR 338 Sevierville; SR 66 Sevierville–Kodak

Major junctions
- South end: US 441 / SR 73 Scenic in Gatlinburg
- US 321 in Gatlinburg; Gatlinburg Bypass in Gatlinburg; US 321 in Pigeon Forge; US 411 in Sevierville; SR 66 in Sevierville; SR 139 near Kodak
- North end: I-40 in Kodak

Location
- Country: United States
- State: Tennessee

Highway system
- United States Numbered Highway System; List; Special; Divided; Tennessee State Routes; Interstate; US; State

The Great Smoky Mountains Parkway is a highway that travels 23.04 miles (37.08 km) between the Great Smoky Mountains National Park and Interstate 40 (I-40) in Kodak, Tennessee, United States. It serves as the main thoroughfare for Gatlinburg, Pigeon Forge, and Sevierville, and includes a 4.3-mile (6.9 km) spur of the Foothills Parkway. It is composed of sections of several numbered highways, including U.S. Route 441 (US 441), US 321, State Route 66 (SR 66), SR 73 Scenic, and SR 448, along with unsigned segments of SR 71 and SR 73 that are companion designations for the US routes. Most of the route is a six-lane divided highway, with the southern segment containing four lanes. The road roughly follows the Little Pigeon River for most of its length.

The parkway serves as the primary means of access to the Great Smoky Mountains National Park, the most visited national park in the United States, and the numerous tourist attractions located within the cities of Sevierville, Pigeon Forge, and Gatlinburg. Most of the route follows an old Native American trail that existed for many centuries prior to the arrival of European American settlers. After the establishment of the national park in 1934, an effort began to improve the network of roads serving the park. Much of the modern route was constructed and expanded in the 1950s and 1960s, and the northern portion of the route was constructed on a new alignment to connect Sevierville to I-40 in the 1970s. Due to the rapid rise in tourism, the parkway is now one of the most congested non-freeway roads in the state, carrying more than 50,000 vehicles per day in some locations. Between the mid-1980s and mid-2010s, the parkway was further expanded and improved to handle increasing traffic volumes.

== Route description ==
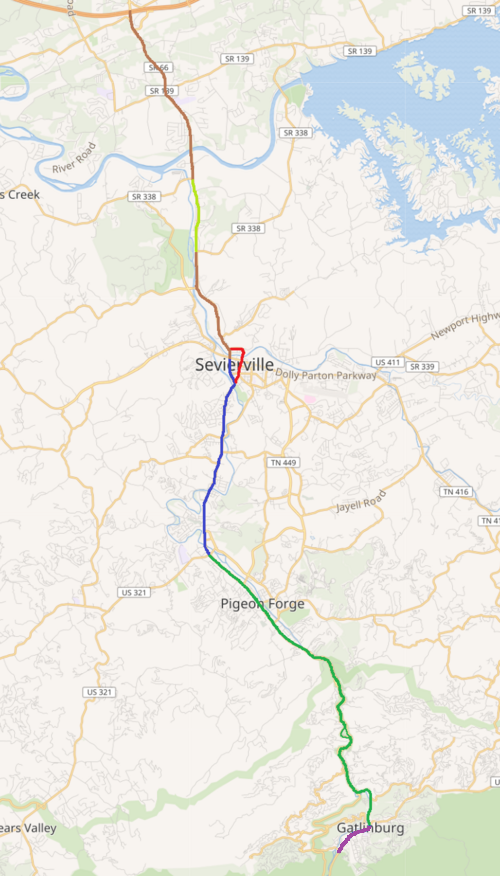
Signed component highways of the Great Smoky Mountains Parkway: US 441 / SR 73 Scenic US 321 / US 441 US 441 SR 448 SR 66 SR 66 / SR 338

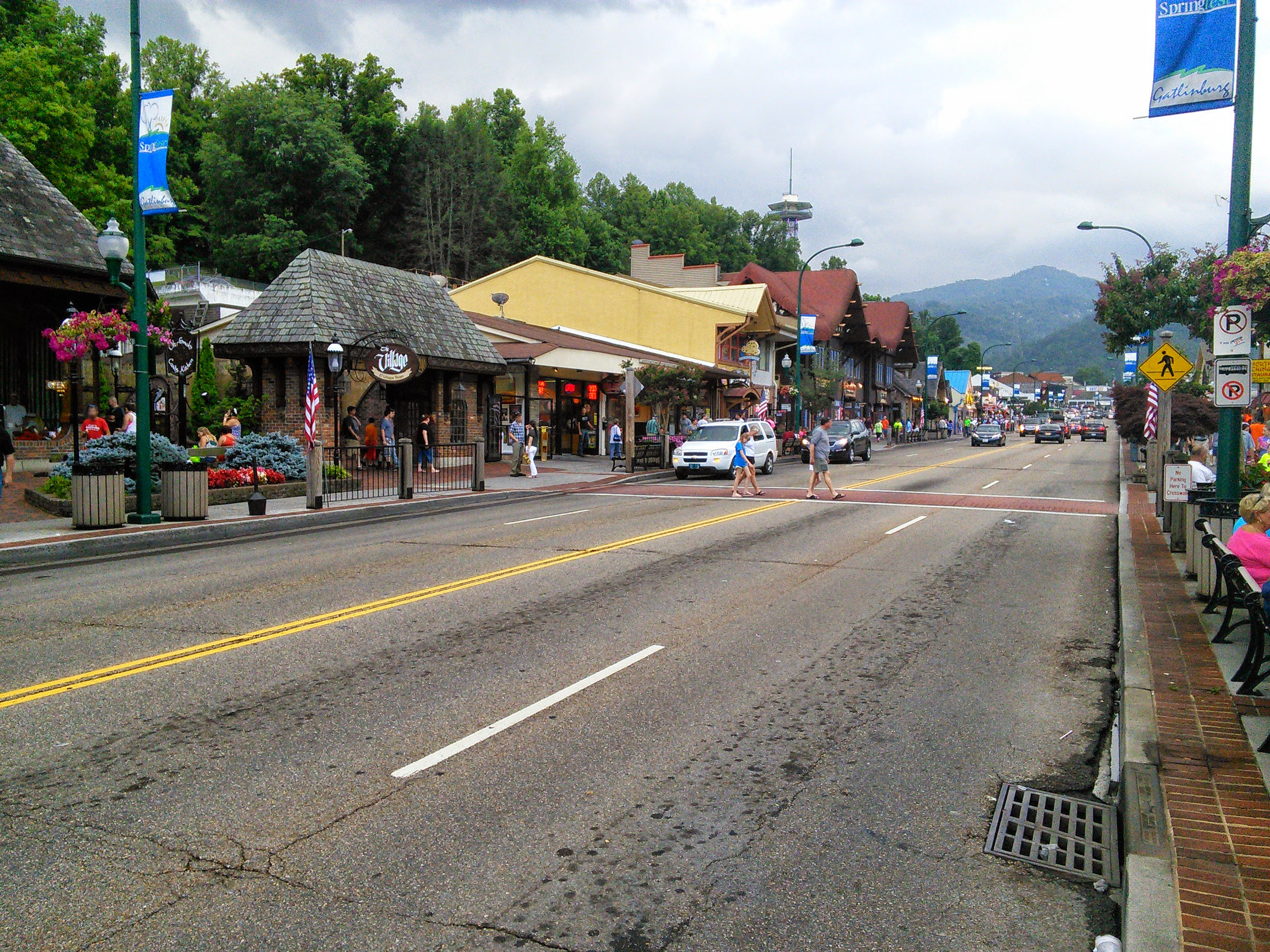
The Great Smoky Mountains Parkway in downtown Gatlinburg is a four-lane undivided highway

Most of the Great Smoky Mountains Parkway is maintained by the Tennessee Department of Transportation (TDOT), with the exception of the section between Gatlinburg and Pigeon Forge, which is maintained by the National Park Service (NPS). The parkway is part of the National Highway System, a national network of roads identified as important to the country's economy, defense, and mobility. All of the Great Smoky Mountains Parkway is a divided highway, except for the segment in Gatlinburg which is an undivided four-lane highway. Most of the parkway has been widened to six lanes, and is one of the most congested arterial routes in the state. In 2024, annual average daily traffic volumes ranged from 57,867 vehicles per day north of downtown Sevierville, to 25,729 vehicles per day in northern Gatlinburg at Dudley Creek. Gatlinburg and Pigeon Forge have numbered each traffic light sequentially (with the exception of lights 2A and 2B in Pigeon Forge) to make it easier for non-locals to find their hotels and other tourist attractions. Sevierville has its traffic lights numbered in miles and tenths, according to the mileage from an intersection approximately 1.7 miles (2.7 km) inside the national park boundary.

The Great Smoky Mountains Parkway begins as US 441 and SR 73 Scenic at the boundary between the national park and the city limits of Gatlinburg, where it continues into the park as two-lane Newfound Gap Road. The route immediately widens to four lanes as an undivided arterial route. In downtown Gatlinburg, the route has several intersections with surface streets, and signalized pedestrian crosswalks are provided across the road in frequent intervals. The route turns north at an intersection with US 321, where SR 73 Scenic ends, and beginning a wrong-way concurrency with the former route.

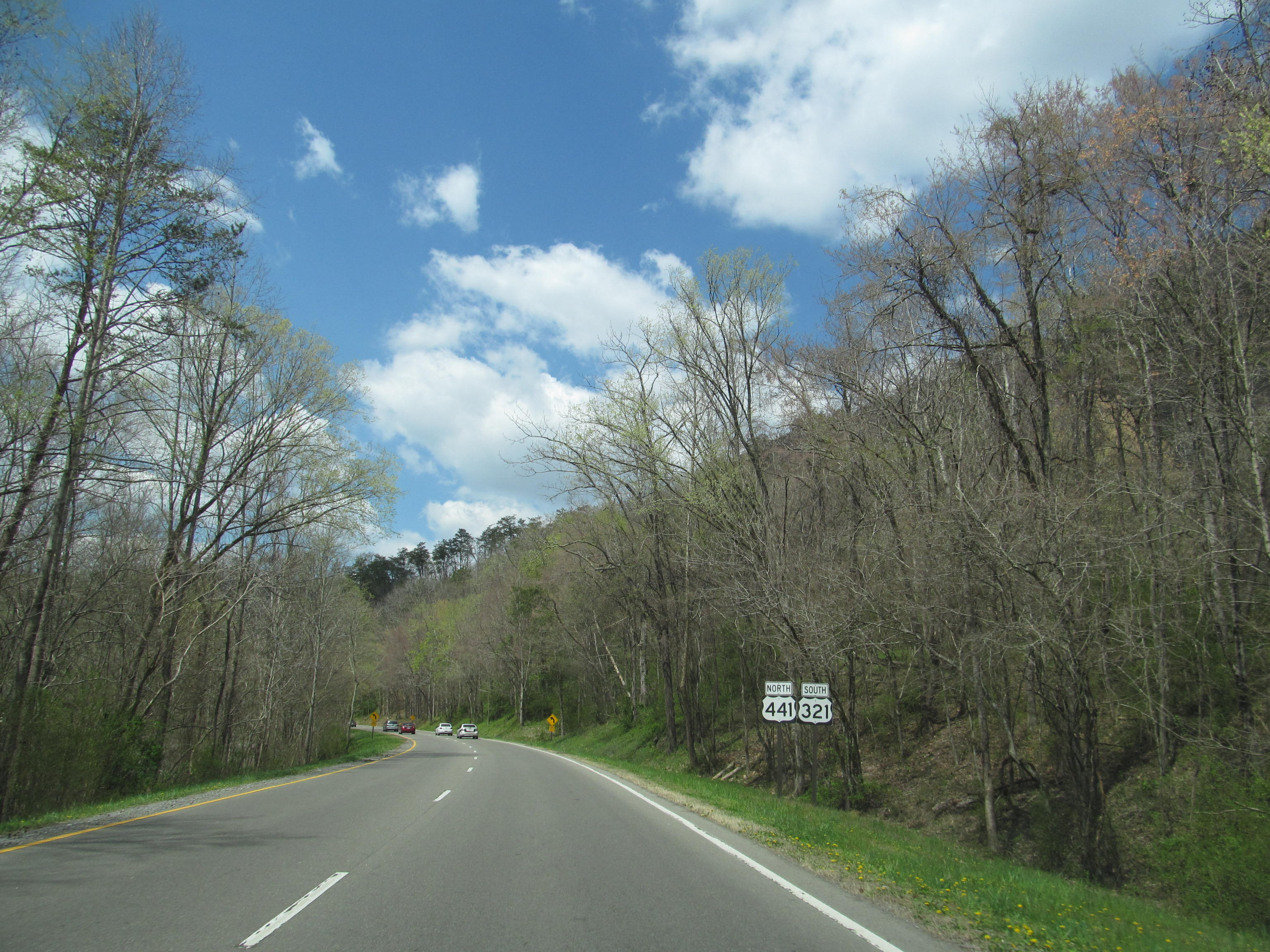
The northbound lanes of the Gatlinburg Spur section of the parkway

Leaving Gatlinburg, the parkway passes through the Little Pigeon River gorge and becomes part of the Foothills Parkway as its spur route, although that roadway has yet to be built in the area (the right of way for it already includes land for a small interchange adjacent to the southern end of the Pigeon Forge city limit). This 4.3-mile (6.9 km) segment, on a narrow strip of NPS land, is a four-lane divided highway which runs along both banks of the northward-flowing West Prong of the Little Pigeon River. Where the river briefly diverts to the west and back east again, the southbound lanes on the west bank also curve around, while the northbound lanes pass through a tunnel. The Gatlinburg visitor center is located just before entering the town from the north. The northern terminus of the Gatlinburg Bypass, which is also maintained by the NPS, connects with the parkway at an interchange to provide a direct access to the national park just beyond the city limits of Gatlinburg. All of these parkways are operated as part of the Great Smoky Mountains National Park, unlike other separate National Parkways, with support for design and road construction, including repaving, from the Federal Highway Administration (FHWA) through the Public Lands Transportation Program (PLTP) as in other national parks.

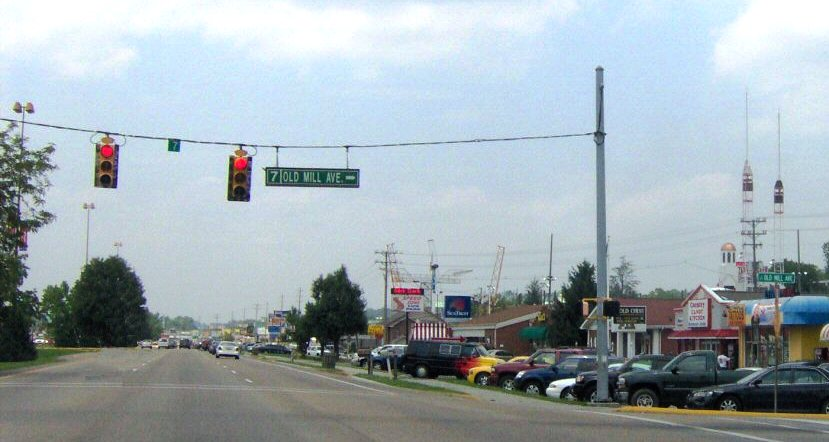
The "Strip" section of the parkway in Pigeon Forge in 2007

Entering Pigeon Forge, the NPS corridor ends, the river passes under the northbound lanes, and the route widens to six lanes. A short distance later is an intersection with SR 449 (Dollywood Lane), which serves as an important means of access to Dollywood and Dollywood's Splash Country, and is also an alternate route to the parkway between Pigeon Forge and Sevierville. The parkway then enters a section through the principal commercial area of Pigeon Forge sometimes known as "The Strip". This section is flanked by numerous tourist attractions on both sides. It also features an unusually wide median, and is lit by high-mast lighting. A short distance beyond this point, US 321 splits off to the west, heading through Wears Valley and towards Maryville.

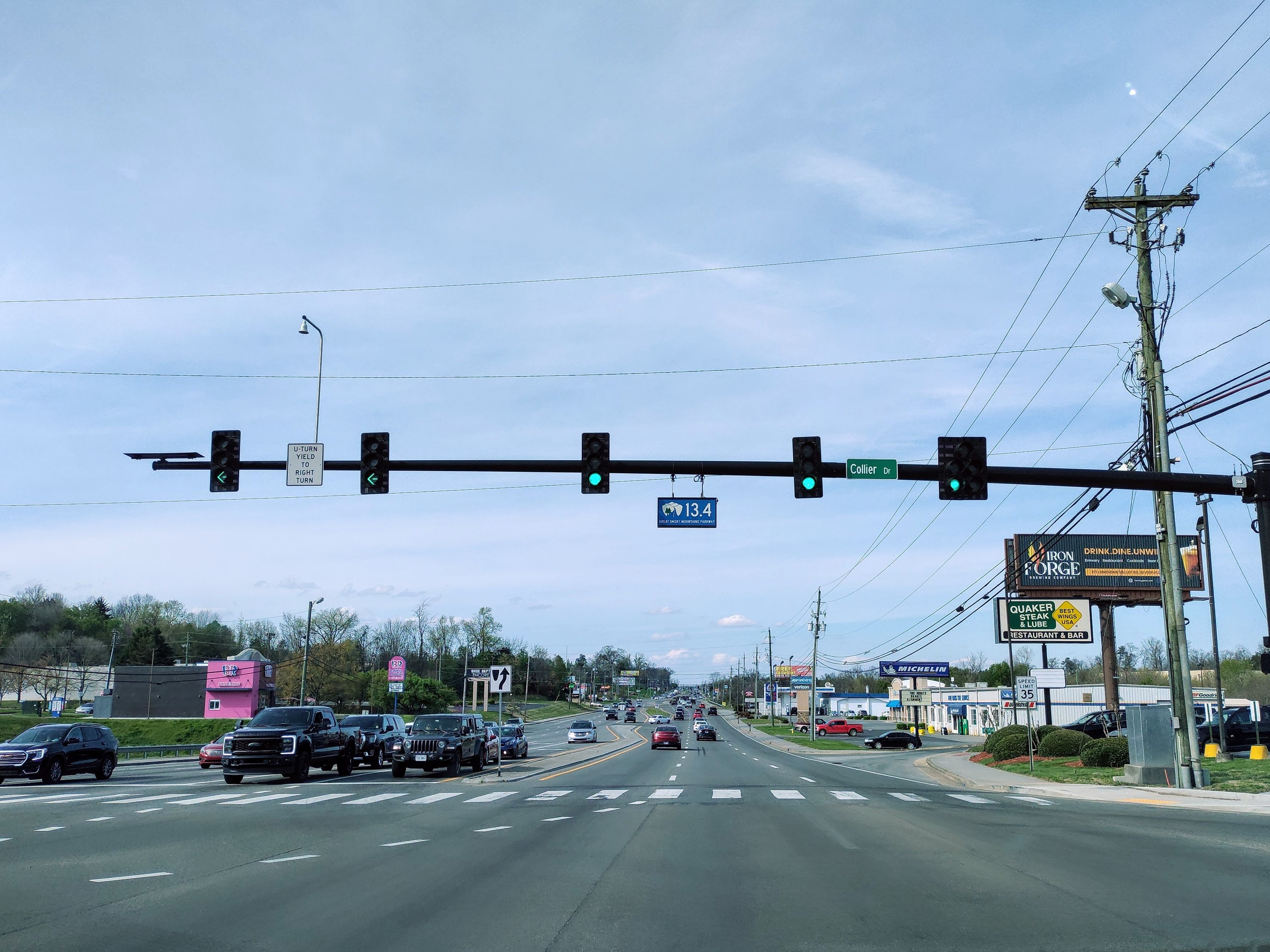
The intersection with Collier Drive. Mileposts for the parkway are posted overhead at signalized intersections in Sevierville

The parkway then continues through further tourist attractions, and crosses the West Prong of the Little Pigeon River twice in short succession. The second river crossing is also the boundary between Pigeon Forge and Sevierville. Here, the parkway remains surrounded by tourist attractions. A few miles later, in downtown Sevierville, the parkway crosses the West Prong for a final time and splits into an east and west branch, which together encircle the business district of Sevierville. Northbound traffic is directed along the east branch, which contains three northbound lanes and one southbound lane; southbound traffic is diverted onto the west branch, which contains three southbound lanes and one to two northbound lanes. The eastbound branch is designated as SR 448. In this split section, both north and southbound lanes intersect with US 411, where US 441 splits off into a concurrency with this road to the west, heading towards Knoxville. Here, the parkway becomes part of SR 66. Both branches also cross the Little Pigeon River immediately north of US 411.

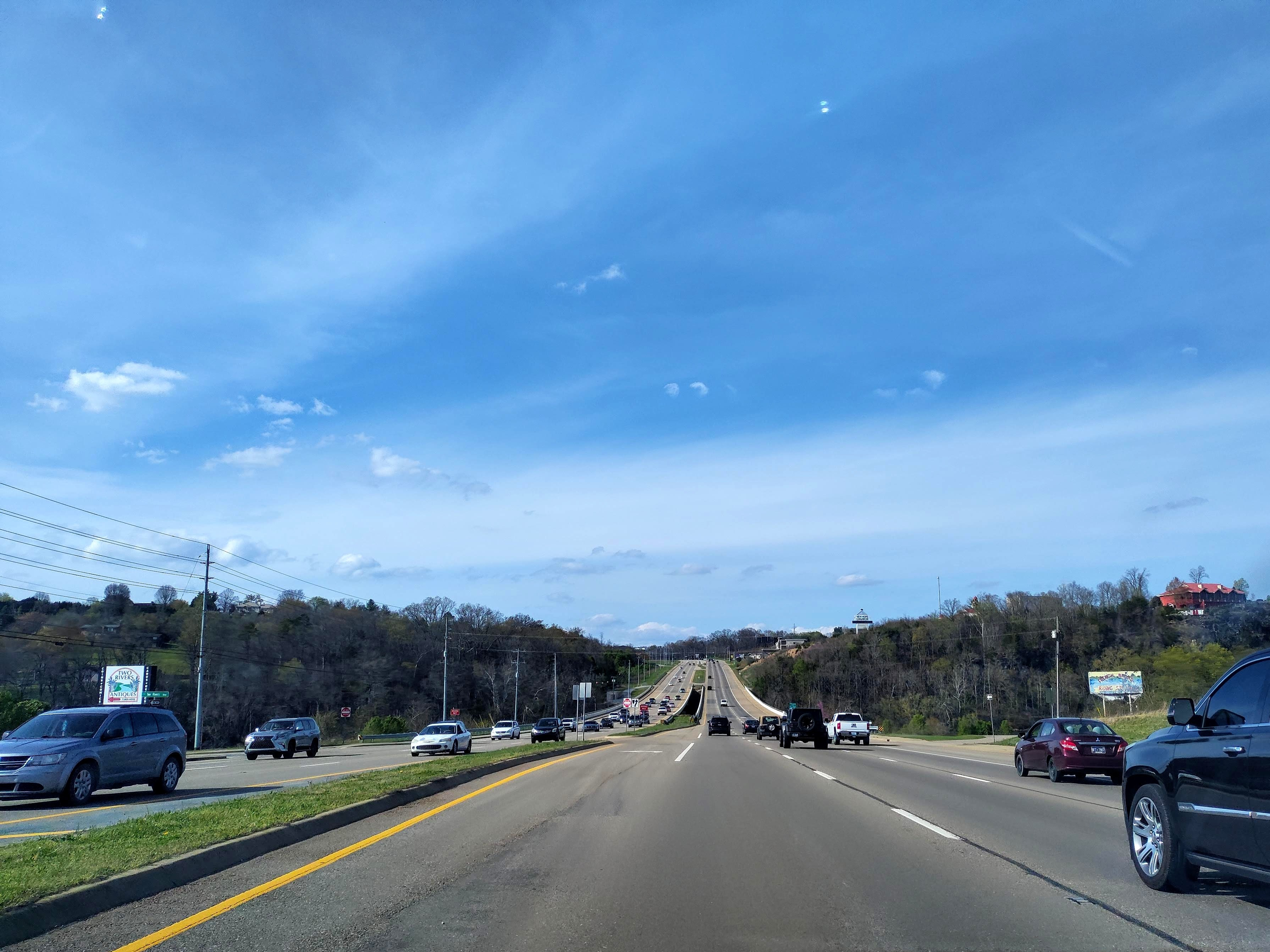
The SR 66 section of the parkway north of Sevierville, approaching the French Broad River crossing

Leaving downtown, the parkway continues north for several more miles as a six-lane divided highway through a less-developed area, following the east bank of the Little Pigeon River. The parkway begins a concurrency with SR 338 in the Catlettsburg community a short distance beyond. A few miles later, this route splits off to the west, and the parkway crosses the French Broad River a short distance later. Crossing several ridges, the parkway intersects with SR 139 before reaching its northern terminus a few miles later at exit 407, a diverging diamond interchange with I-40 in the community of Kodak. Due to its status as the primary means of access to the national park and related attractions, this interchange is one of the busiest Interstate interchanges in the state that is not with another Interstate Highway. The route continues to the north as a county-maintained surface street that eventually connects to US 25W/70, and SR 66 splits off onto an unsigned concurrency with I-40 to the east.

=== Christmas displays ===
Within the cities, the parkway is decorated with Christmas lights during the winter season. In Pigeon Forge, the high-mast street lights in the median are decorated with white LED snowflakes that fall down the poles. This section of the parkway is included in a driving tour that is part of a series of events called Winterfest, which was established in 1989 to attract more tourists during the holiday season. In Gatlinburg, white LED deciduous trees sprout from the lampposts, in addition to other displays, such as a large one that stretches across the road at the town's northern entrance. In Sevierville, the traditional and much brighter snowflake light sculptures are used.

=== Names and honorary designations ===
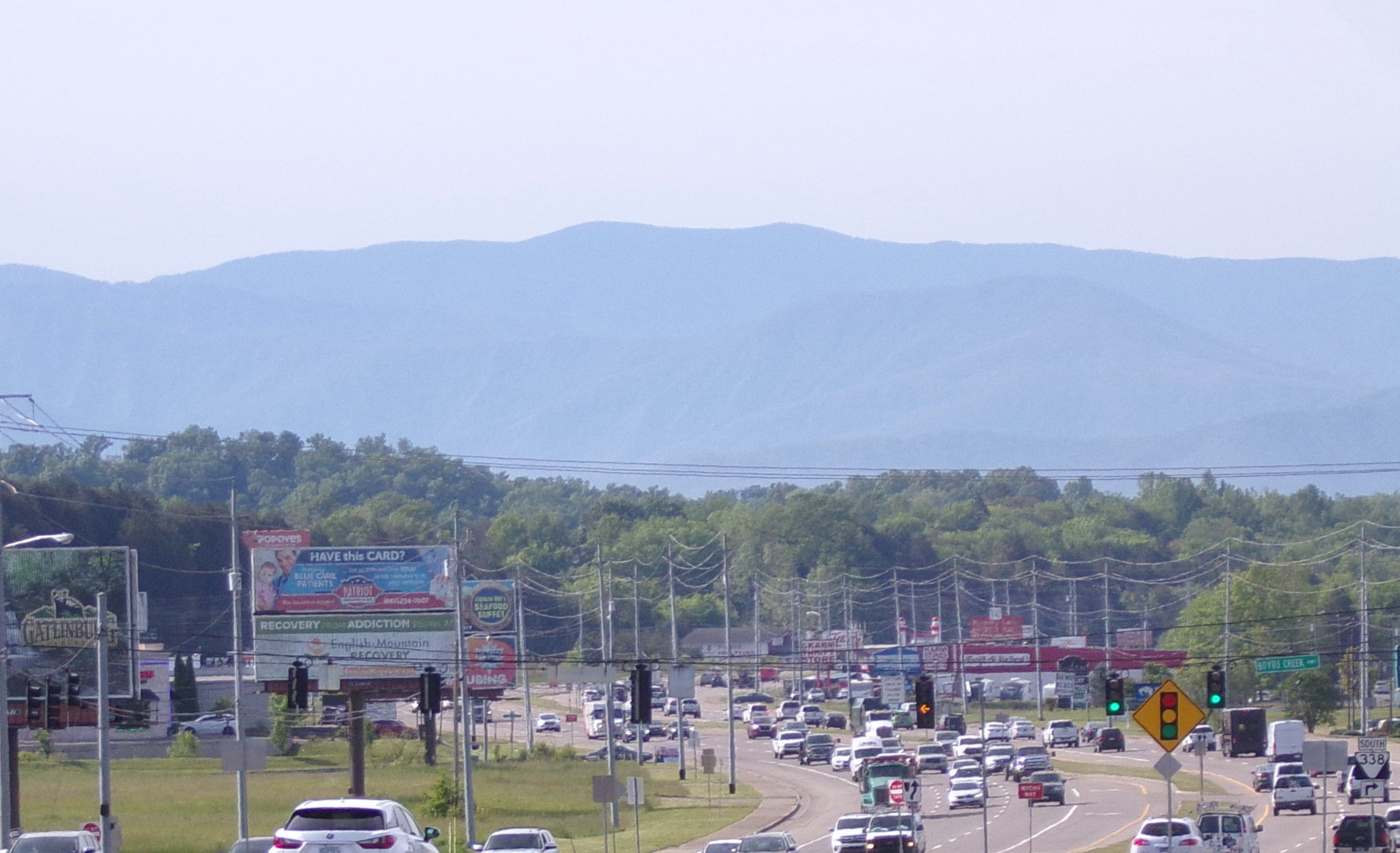
The parkway in Sevierville with Kuwohi, the highest mountain in the Great Smoky Mountains, visible in the background

The section of the parkway from the national park boundary in Gatlinburg and the fork with SR 448 in Sevierville is called "Parkway", and is often referred to as "the Parkway", along with the rest of the route. In addition, the section between Gatlinburg and Pigeon Forge that is maintained by the NPS is also called the "Gatlinburg Spur". The eastern branch of the parkway in Sevierville made of up SR 448 is called "North Parkway", and the western branch that consists of US 441 between the split and US 411 is called "Forks of the River Parkway", after the confluence in the Little Pigeon River in downtown Sevierville.

The SR 66 portion of the parkway between US 411 in Sevierville and I-40 in Kodak is named "Winfield Dunn Parkway" after Winfield Dunn, the 43rd Governor of Tennessee who served from 1971 to 1975. The name was adopted by the Tennessee General Assembly in 1973 while the segment was under construction. During Dunn's tenure, his administration allocated funds for the construction of the parkway between Sevierville and I-40 to provide a more direct route between the Interstate and the national park. The bridge across the Little Pigeon River on the SR 66 portion of the parkway in Sevierville is designated the "Fred C. Atchley Memorial Bridge" after a state representative from the area who worked to secure the funds for the replacement of the previous bridge. It was first named for him in March 1963. The bridges spanning the French Broad River are named the "Ray L. Reagan Memorial Bridge" after a Sevier County executive who served in that position from 1958 until his death in 1978.

== History ==
=== Early history ===
For many centuries before the arrival of European settlers, Cherokee hunters, as well as other Native American peoples before them, used a footpath known as the Indian Gap Trail to access the abundant game in the forests and coves of the Great Smoky Mountains. This trail connected the Great Indian Warpath with Rutherford Indian Trace, following the West Fork of the Little Pigeon River from modern-day Sevierville through modern-day Pigeon Forge, Gatlinburg, and the Sugarlands, crossing the crest of the Smokies along the slopes of Mount Collins, and descending into North Carolina along the banks of the Oconaluftee River. In the 1830s, the road was expanded to a width of five feet (1.5 m), and became a toll road, with charges for pedestrians, riders, vehicles, and livestock. The road was steep, rocky, rutted, and regularly blocked by fallen trees, and travelers often opted for longer, less treacherous routes around the mountains. During the American Civil War, Colonel William Holland Thomas and a party of 600 Cherokees further improved the trail into a road that was used by both Union and Confederate forces. In 1895 and 1896, a five-span steel truss bridge was constructed across the Little Pigeon River in Sevierville by Schultz Bridge and Iron Company. In the early 20th century a bridge across the little Pigeon River called Banner Bridge also existed in the gorge between Gatlinburg and Pigeon Forge.

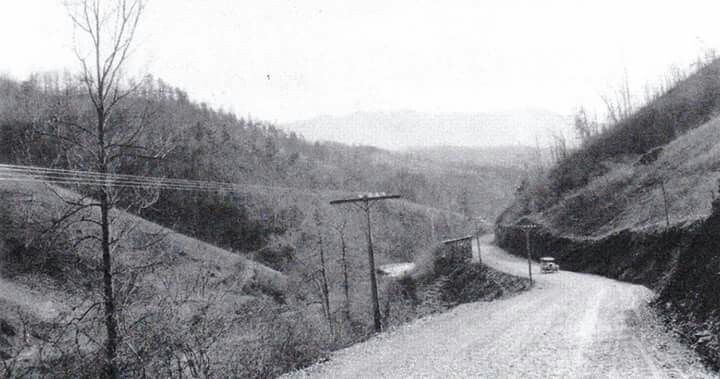
The old road along the Little Pigeon River gorge between Gatlinburg and Pigeon Forge, c. 1920s

On October 1, 1923, SR 71 was established along the Indian Gap Trail between Indian Gap at the North Carolina state line and the present intersection of US 411 with US 441 (then SR 65) in Sevierville. This was one of the first 78 numbered state routes designated in Tennessee. On July 8, 1927, a contract was awarded to grade and drain the section of SR 71 through Gatlinburg, and this was completed on July 12, 1930. A contract to surface treat the section between Pigeon Forge and Sevierville was awarded on June 15, 1928, and was completed on September 30, 1930. In 1932, the National Park Service completed construction of Newfound Gap Road in preparation for the park. This same year, SR 71 was rerouted onto the section of Newfound Gap Road between the North Carolina state line and Gatlinburg. The old road followed the approximate location of the Road Prong Trail between Indian Gap and the Chimney Tops trailhead.

=== National park establishment, proposals, and early construction ===
After the establishment of the Great Smoky Mountains National Park in 1934, the state and NPS began preparing to improve the network of roads serving the area, which included upgrading SR 71 between Gatlinburg and Sevierville, and from there along the Chapman Highway to Knoxville. Paving of the last section of this route, located on US 411 west of Sevierville, was completed in December of that year. In October 1939, the Sevier County Court voted to begin clearing right-of-way for the proposed route between Gatlinburg and Banner Bridge. That same year, the road in Gatlinburg was expanded to four lanes. Around the same time, a proposal to route the road east of Sevierville to tie into Chapman Highway was shot down after residents of Sevierville expressed opposition. The state also began pushing for a U.S. Route designation through the park.

A 1940 state proposal for a two-lane road between Gatlinburg and Pigeon Forge, which would have straightened out the curves on the old road, was rejected by the Bureau of Public Roads (BPR), predecessor to the Federal Highway Administration (FHWA), which wanted a four-lane highway with carriageways on each side of the river. In August 1940, the Tennessee Department of Highways and Public Works (predecessor agency to TDOT) announced that they had completed another survey for a road on the west bank of the Pigeon River and a new bridge near Banner Bridge. This proposal was rejected several weeks later by the Public Roads Administration district engineer in Montgomery, Alabama, who stated the 100-foot-wide (30 m) right-of-way was inadequate. On December 4, 1940, a public meeting was held at the Andrew Johnson Hotel in Knoxville to discuss road improvements to the national park. Here, federal highway officials stated that they were requiring a 400-foot (120 m) right-of-way in the gorge and a 120-foot (37 m) right-of-way extending north to Sevierville. In response, the state began studying this alignment later that month. In July 1941, the Sevier County Court agreed to furnish right-of-way for the segment between the gorge and US 411 in Sevierville, and three months later, the survey for the road was completed.

In February 1944, Congress authorized the Foothills Parkway, which included the section of the parkway between Gatlinburg and Sevierville. This portion of the road became known as the Gatlinburg Spur. On September 14, 1945, a $9 million (equivalent to $127 million in 2025) plan to improve roads within and around the park was announced by the BPR, which included construction of the four-lane highway between Gatlinburg and Sevierville, and from there along Chapman Highway to Knoxville. That year, the bridge over the Pigeon River immediately south of downtown Sevierville was reconstructed. On June 13, 1947, a contract was awarded to construct a new 7.3-mile (11.7 km) alignment between the gorge and US 411 in Sevierville, which was four lanes from Caney Creek to near the present-day US 321 (Wears Valley Road) and two lanes elsewhere. This new road opened to traffic in March 1950 with a temporary oil surfacing, although it was not yet paved. In 1949 and 1950, the 0.4-mile (0.64 km) segment of the road in Gatlinburg extending to Dudley Creek on the north end was expanded to four lanes. Around 1950, SR 73 was extended onto a concurrency with SR 71 through Gatlinburg as part of an eastward extension of this route to Cosby. On October 21, 1951, the American Association of State Highway Officials (AASHO) approved redesignating the section between Newfound Gap and Sevierville as part of US 441, and SR 71 and SR 73 became hidden companion designations.

=== Gatlinburg Spur construction and Interstate Highway era ===
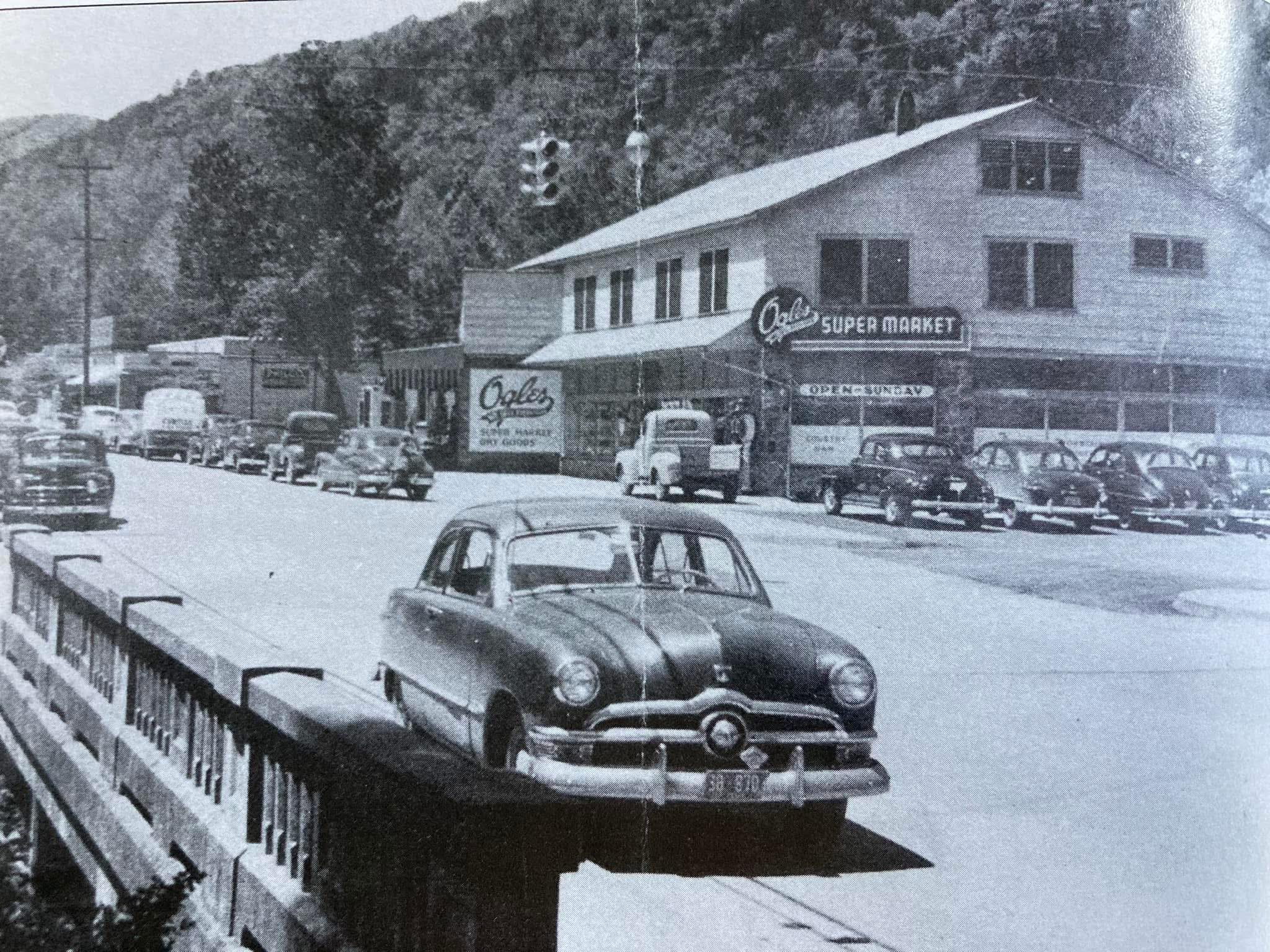
The parkway in downtown Gatlinburg in the 1950s.

Construction on the first section of the Gatlinburg Spur was planned to start in the fall of 1948, but quickly ran into delays caused by difficulties appraising and acquiring rights-of-way. In July 1949, the NPS announced that they were delaying funding appropriations for the road until the state acquired the right-of-way. This was announced to have been completed in March 1950, but experienced further delays when the state failed to turn the deeds over to the NPS until May 1951. As tourism to the park increased as part of the post-World War II boom, the parkway and other roads leading to the park became overwhelmed with traffic, leading to congestion and deadly crashes on curvy segments and outdated bridges. This led to criticisms of the delays and accusations that the state and federal governments were not making strong enough efforts to improve these roads.

In preparation for construction of the Gatlinburg Spur, work to construct a new four-lane bridge over Dudley Creek in Gatlinburg began on September 26, 1951, and was completed on September 19, 1952. The southbound bridge over the West Prong of the Little Pigeon River was constructed between September 27, 1951, and November 3, 1952. Work on the southern segment of the Gatlinburg Spur began on September 16, 1952, and a temporary alignment opened to traffic on July 14, 1953. Final completion of the project occurred on May 27, 1954. A contract to pave the 7.3-mile (11.7 km) stretch of the parkway through Pigeon Forge from Caney Creek to US 411 in Sevierville was awarded on December 3, 1954, and construction was completed on November 21, 1955. Construction on the section of the spur between Banner Bridge and Caney Creek south of Pigeon Forge began on April 25, 1957, and was completed on October 29, 1958, with the exception of the northbound tunnel, which opened on March 3, 1959, and initially carried only one lane. These improvements coincided with widening US 441 (Chapman Highway) between Knoxville and Sevierville, which, combined with the parkway, was the primary means of access to the national park at the time.

Once the northbound lanes of the spur were complete, reconstruction of the southbound lanes began on September 17, 1959. The project was slated for completion in June 1961, but was delayed by rockslides that spring. After the slides continued to worsen, construction was suspended on August 25, 1961. The reconstruction was completed on December 22, 1961, with the exception of the slide area. One of the slide areas was reopened on May 18, 1962, after the debris was removed. The other slide debris proved more difficult to clear, a process that was not completed until June 1, 1962. As originally planned, maintenance of the Gatlinburg Spur was to be turned over to the state highway department once construction was complete. In January 1969, the NPS sent letters to Tennessee's congressional delegation asking them to introduce legislation to initiate this transfer, although some NPS personnel were concerned that the state would allow commercialization and billboards along the route. President Richard Nixon signed a resolution authorizing this transfer on August 9, 1969. However, the highway department refused to accept the road unless the NPS made certain improvements, which they subsequently refused. As a result, the spur has remained under the jurisdiction of the NPS.

Around 1948, the Tennessee Department of Highways assumed control of the bridge across the Little Pigeon River north of downtown Sevierville, designating it as part of an extension of SR 66. The department began preparing to replace the bridge in the late 1950s. On October 18, 1961, the wooden roadbed of one of the five spans on this bridge collapsed after a concrete truck drove over it. A second roadbed span collapsed about 30 minutes later. The bridge was repaired by the following month to allow for temporary use until it could be completely replaced. A replacement bridge was constructed east of the old one in 1962. A contract to widen the 4.3-mile (6.9 km) section between northern Pigeon Forge and downtown Sevierville to four lanes was awarded on June 24, 1966, with completion slated for July 1967. This was the last section of US 441 between the national park and Knoxville to be expanded to four lanes. The construction of I-40 resulted in the need for a more direct access between the Interstate and the park. To accomplish this, the section of the parkway from near the present-day southern intersection with SR 338 in Catlettsburg and I-40 in Kodak was constructed in conjunction with the Interstate, and the portion extending to downtown Sevierville was straightened. This section of I-40, which was the last planned section of this Interstate in Tennessee to be built, partially opened to traffic on December 20, 1974, and fully opened on September 12, 1975. SR 66 was rerouted onto the new alignment upon its completion; this highway originally followed what is now SR 338 and SR 139 between Catlettsburg and Dandridge. This section of the parkway between Sevierville and I-40 was initially four lanes through the I-40 interchange, and two lanes elsewhere, with provisions made for expansion to four lanes. Sidewalks were installed along the parkway in Pigeon Forge in 1978.

=== Later history ===
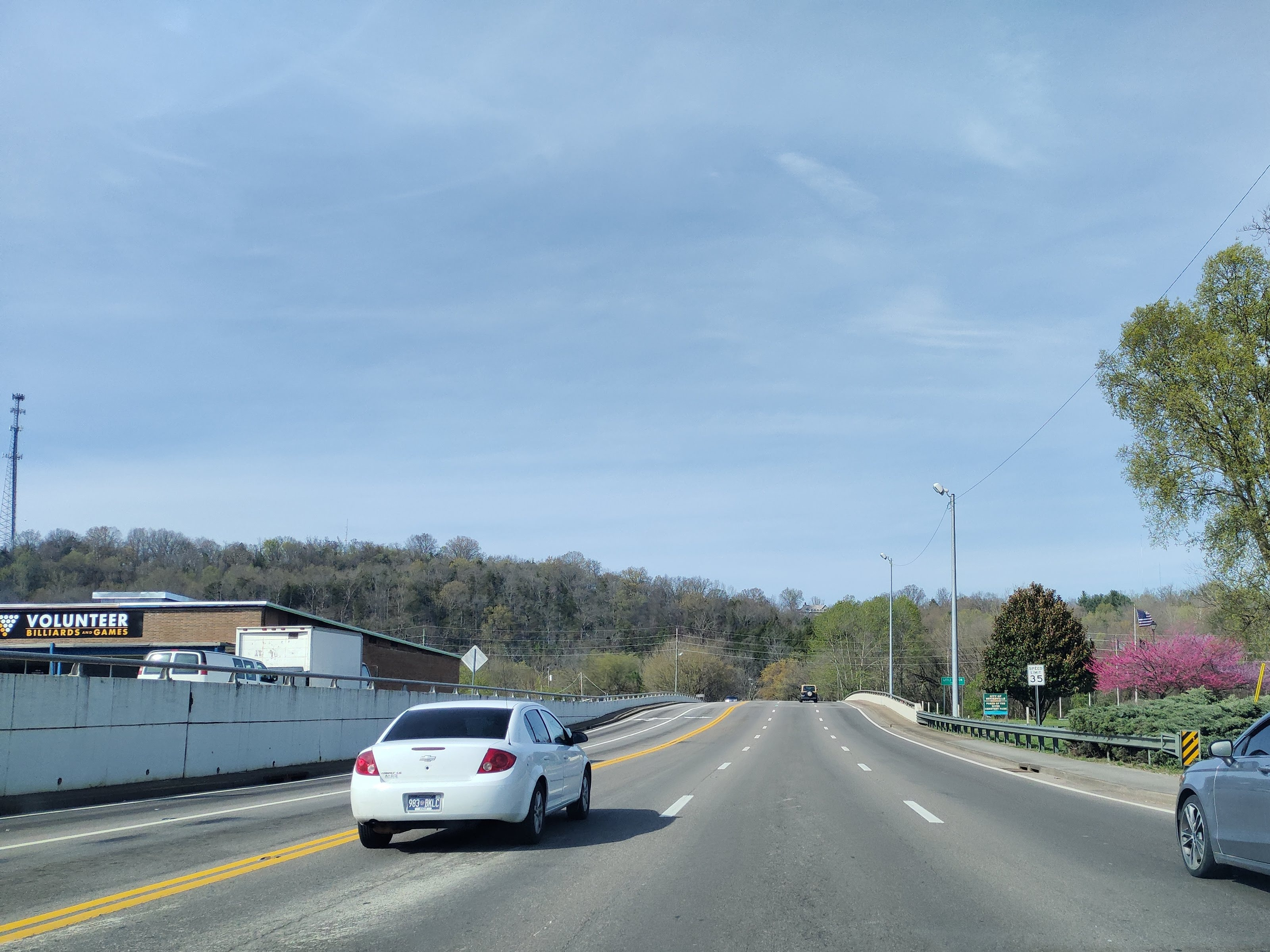
SR 448 (North Parkway), which carries the northbound lanes of the parkway around downtown Sevierville

On October 3, 1981, AASHTO approved an extension of US 321 in Tennessee, which included the segment that is part of the parkway. This was created to provide a continuous highway numbering designation for motorists who choose to use the scenic routes to access the park instead of I-40. As part of this renumbering, SR 73 was rerouted to become a companion route of US 321 along the parkway, and the original segment through Gatlinburg was redesignated SR 73 Scenic. SR 338 was established as part of a statewide takeover of local roads on July 1, 1983. By that year, the SR 66 portion of the parkway had been widened between US 411 and the southern intersection with SR 338. The four-lane section was extended to the French Broad River by June 1986, and the second span across the river was complete by June 1987. The last section, between the river and I-40, was let in May 1987, after a five-month delay due to a freeze in federal highway funding.

As tourism to the area increased and new attractions sprung up along the parkway in Gatlinburg and Pigeon Forge, traffic congestion continued to worsen. A boom in tourism was attributed to the success of the 1982 World's Fair in Knoxville, and the congestion problem was particularly exacerbated with the opening of Dollywood in 1986. That year the Strip section of the parkway through Pigeon Forge between the Gatlinburg Spur and US 321 was expanded by restriping right turn lanes and shoulders to add a third lane in each direction and cutting additional turn lanes into the median. Also that year, Pigeon Forge began running a trolley system along the parkway to serve Dollywood and other tourist hotspots. The 1.5-mile (2.4 km) section of the parkway between US 321 (Wears Valley Road) in Pigeon Forge and the Little Pigeon River was widened to six lanes between late 1989 and May 1991.

On November 5, 1990, construction began to lower the roadway in the northbound tunnel on the Gatlinburg Spur to allow for two lanes, eliminating the traffic bottleneck here. During this time, the tunnel was completely closed, and northbound traffic was routed onto the southbound lanes of the spur. The tunnel was reopened during the tourist season in 1991, but closed by November 2 of that year to allow the next phase to proceed. The project was completed in May 1992. Northbound traffic on the spur was originally reduced from two lanes to one at the Gatlinburg Bypass interchange, creating another bottleneck; the northbound bypass ramp then merged to become a second lane once again. In August 1993, work began on a project to remove this chokepoint, which consisted of widening the northbound parkway to two continuous lanes through the interchange, and constructing a merge lane for traffic transitioning from the bypass to the northbound parkway. Initially slated for completion on March 31, 1994, the project was repeatedly delayed by geological issues, weather conditions, and equipment problems. Construction was suspended two months later to make way for summer traffic, and resumed in November, with completion slated by the end of the year.

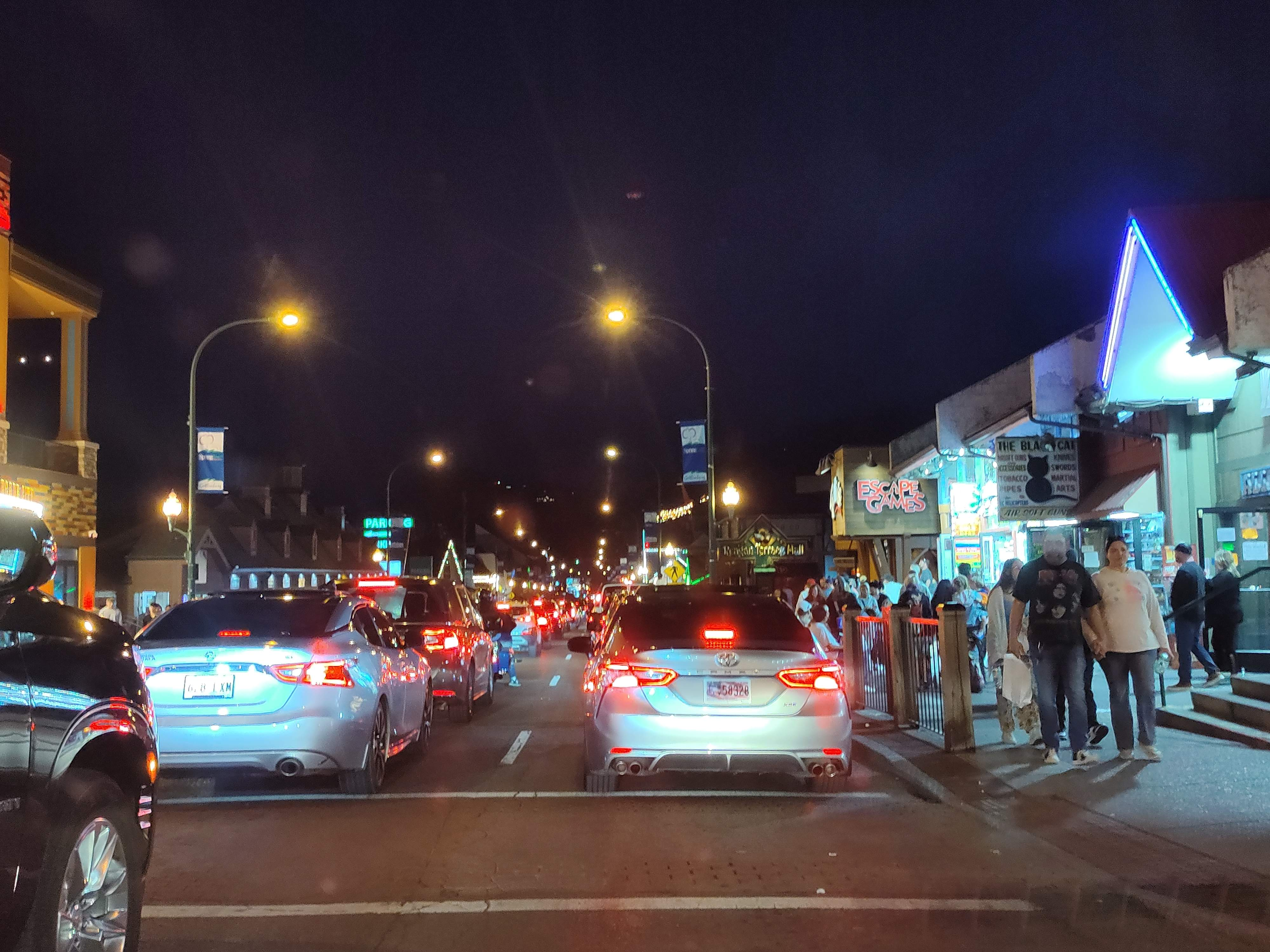
Heavy traffic on the parkway in Gatlinburg at night

In 1996, Sevierville officials, in partnership with TDOT, began work on a transportation plan to address traffic congestion, which was expected to cost $70 million (equivalent to $130 million in 2025) and take ten years at the time. This plan included widening the parkway to six lanes between Sevierville and I-40, construction of SR 448 (North Parkway), and a new bypass around Pigeon Forge, which would eventually become SR 449 (Veterans Parkway). In March 1997, Native American artifacts from the Early Woodland period were discovered when construction began to widen the section between the Pigeon River in northern Pigeon Forge and US 411 in Sevierville to six lanes. The project was planned for completion by November 1998, but ran into a roughly year-long delay caused by late utility adjustments. On April 18, 1997, construction was completed on a project that added a loop ramp at the I-40 interchange from the northbound lanes of the parkway onto I-40 westbound and widened the eastbound offramp. Several graves of settlers in the adjacent Forks of the River Cemetery were relocated to another part of the cemetery in 2002 to make way for North Parkway. This project also required removing several residences in the Love Addition mobile home park. Construction began on North Parkway in early 2003, which was incorporated into a larger city project called Ultraflow. The project ran into multiple delays, and TDOT was required to gain permits for wetlands relocation and bridge construction after construction began, repeatedly pushing completion past the projected date of fall 2004. On July 8, 2006, the North Parkway section of the parkway opened to traffic.

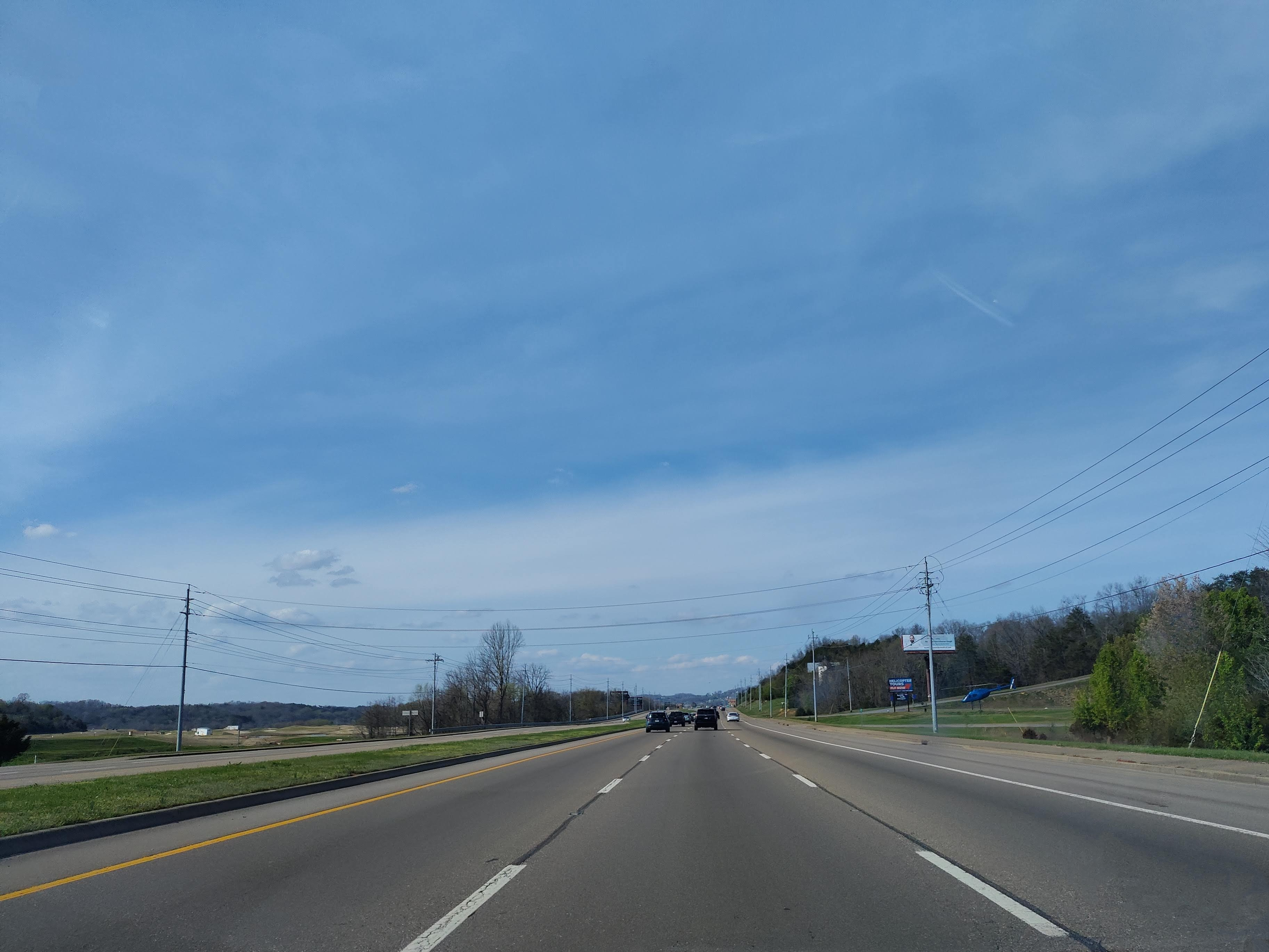
A less-developed stretch of the parkway north of downtown Sevierville

The northernmost segment of the parkway between Sevierville and I-40 was widened to six lanes and received sidewalks in three phases with funding from the American Recovery and Reinvestment Act. Phase 1, between Nichols Street and SR 338, began on July 15, 2009, and was completed on November 18, 2011. Phase 2, between SR 139 and I-40, began in September 2010 and was completed in November 2012. Phase 3, between SR 338 and SR 139 began in March 2012, and was expected to be completed by October 31, 2014, but experienced multiple delays caused by issues with stormwater drainage pipes and the foundation of the French Broad River bridge piers, and wasn't completed until the middle of 2016. The interchange with I-40 was reconstructed into a diverging diamond interchange between March 12, 2014, and June 30, 2015, which also included widening and lengthening the ramps. The NPS completed a study that analyzed traffic issues on the Gatlinburg Spur and potential improvements in June 2019, and an environmental assessment was completed in May 2022. The first phase, which consists of paving shoulders, replacing outdated or damaged guardrails, and safety improvements at gravel pull-offs, began on January 5, 2026, and was expected to be completed on April 14, 2026. Future projects will include bridge replacements and rehabilitations, minor roadway realignments, and rockfall mitigation.

== Junction list ==
The entire route is in Sevier County.

Location	mi	km	Destinations	Notes
Great Smoky Mountains National Park–Gatlinburg line	0.00	0.00	US 441 south (SR 71 / Newfound Gap Road to US 19) / SR 73 Scenic – Cherokee, Bryson City, Maggie Valley	Continuation into Great Smoky Mountains National Park as Newfound Gap Road
Gatlinburg	0.01	0.016	Ski Mountain Road	Access to Ober Gatlinburg
Gatlinburg	0.76– 0.82	1.22– 1.32	Cherokee Orchard Road, River Road, Greystone Heights Road	Triple intersection complex; alternate access to Great Smoky Mountains National Park via Cherokee Orchard Road; access to Ripley's Aquarium of the Smokies via Greystone Heights Road
Gatlinburg	0.96	1.54	US 321 north (SR 73) / SR 73 Scenic ends – Cosby, Newport	Northern end of US 321 concurrency; end of SR 73 Scenic; US 321 continuation as East Parkway to I-40
Gatlinburg	2.10	3.38	Gatlinburg Bypass south – Great Smoky Mountains National Park	Partial directional T interchange; no access between Parkway/Gatlinburg Spur northbound and Gatlinburg Bypass southbound
Gatlinburg–Pigeon Forge line	7.60	12.23	Caney Creek Road	Southbound access only; transition from Gatlinburg to Pigeon Forge
Gatlinburg–Pigeon Forge line	7.60	12.23	Foothills Parkway	Future interchange
Pigeon Forge	7.14	11.49	SR 449 north (Dollywood Lane) – Dollywood	To Dollywood and Dollywood's Splash Country; serves as eastern outer bypass of Pigeon Forge
Pigeon Forge	7.67	12.34	Old Mill Avenue	Access to Pigeon Forge Mill and Teaster Lane
Pigeon Forge	8.27	13.31	Jake Thomas Road	Access to Teaster Lane, Dollywood's DreamMore Resort, HeartSong Lodge, and SR 449 (Veterans Boulevard); road extended in 2024.
Pigeon Forge	9.00	14.48	The Island Drive	Access to The Island at Pigeon Forge and Margaritaville Island Hotel
Pigeon Forge	9.30	14.97	US 321 south (SR 73 / Wears Valley Road) – Townsend, Maryville	Southern end of US 321 concurrency
Pigeon Forge	9.85	15.85	Teaster Lane south	Serves as central Pigeon Forge bypass; access to The Mountain Mile shopping center
Pigeon Forge	9.98	16.06	Henderson Chapel Road	Access to Music Road Resort and Convention Center, Sunliner Diner, and other tourist attractions
Pigeon Forge	10.56	16.99	Music Road	Access to Titanic Museum and Hatfield & McCoy Dinner Feud
Pigeon Forge–Sevierville line	10.87	17.49	Bridge over West Prong Little Pigeon River	
Sevierville	11.29	18.17	Five Oaks Drive	Unsigned; Access to Five Oaks shopping center
Sevierville	11.73	18.88	Collier Drive	Governor's Crossing to SR 449 (Veterans Boulevard); road extended in 2006.
Sevierville	13.34	21.47	US 441 north (SR 71 / Forks of the River Parkway) / SR 448 begins (North Parkway)	Northern end of US 441 concurrency and southern end of SR 448 concurrency; parkway splits into eastern (SR 448) and western (US 441) branches
Sevierville	13.78	22.18	Bruce Street – Downtown Sevierville	
Sevierville	13.89	22.35	US 411 (SR 35 / Main Street) – Newport, Knoxville	Access to Gatlinburg–Pigeon Forge Airport; US 411 north known as Dolly Parton Parkway east of this intersection
Sevierville	14.00	22.53	Bridge over Little Pigeon River	
Sevierville	14.51	23.35	SR 66 (Winfield Dunn Parkway) / SR 448 ends	Northern terminus of SR 448; southern end of SR 66 concurrency; western (SR 66) and eastern (SR 448) branches of the parkway rejoin
Sevierville	16.14	25.97	Gists Creek Road	Access to Wilderness at the Smokies and Soaky Mountain Waterpark
Sevierville	16.98	27.33	SR 338 north (Douglas Dam Road) – Douglas Dam	Northern end of SR 338 concurrency
Sevierville	18.66	30.03	SR 338 south (Boyds Creek Highway) – Boyds Creek	Southern end of SR 338 concurrency
French Broad River	19.23– 19.38	30.95– 31.19	Ray L. Reagan Memorial Bridge	
Kodak	20.86	33.57	SR 139 (Douglas Dam Road) – Dandridge, Kodak	
Kodak	22.45	36.13	Gateway Boulevard	Access to The 407 Gateway to Adventure and Buc-ee's
Kodak	22.71– 23.04	36.55– 37.08	I-40 – Knoxville, Asheville, Bristol	I-40 exit 407; diverging diamond interchange; northern end of SR 66 concurrency; SR 66 continues along I-40 east unsigned; road continues north as Winfield Dunn Parkway and Snyder Road
1.000 mi = 1.609 km; 1.000 km = 0.621 mi: Concurrency terminus; Incomplete access
