= Dupont, Tennessee =

- Location within the U.S. state of Tennessee
- Coordinates: 35°49′30″N 83°42′17″W
- Country: United States
- State: Tennessee
- County: Sevier County

Dupont is a rural community within the larger unincorporated community of Seymour, in Sevier County, Tennessee, United States.

The name "Dupont" is said to come from the term "dew point". A resort that operated between 1901 and 1916 on Bluff Mountain (the local name for the eastern end of Chilhowee Mountain) was initially called “Dew Point” because dew seldom formed at its mountainside location. Over time, the name changed to "Dupont".

Early settlers within the Dupont community had surnames of Gibson, Graves, Latham, Reagan, Rogers and Thomas. Ray Reagan, long-time county judge of Sevier County, was a lifelong resident of Dupont.

Dupont Baptist Church, which began in the old Pickens School House, was founded in 1907 and still exists today. The old Pickens School House was later renamed Dupont School and was used for grades 1-8 until 1970. The schoolhouse was renamed and refurbished as the Dupont Community Center. Firehall Number Three of the Seymour Volunteer Fire Department is located next door to the Dupont Community Center.
