= Ray L. Reagan =

American judge

Ray Lawrence Reagan (August 23, 1921 – March 24, 1978) was the Sevier County, Tennessee, county judge from 1958 until his death in 1978.

Reagan was the first of 10 children born to Lawrence Clifford Reagan and Neva Householder Reagan. He was born, raised, and lived his entire life in the Sevier County community of Dupont. He attended Harrison-Chilhowee Baptist Academy and became the first member of his family to graduate from high school. During World War II, he served in the United States Army Air Forces, working as a mechanic and pilot.

Following the war, Ray Reagan returned to live in Dupont with his wife, the former Louise Ogle, and he commuted to a factory job in Knoxville. His first public office was justice of the peace, beginning in 1956. He was elected county judge in 1958, and was subsequently re-elected for 8-year terms in 1966 and 1974.

As county judge, he spearheaded efforts to attract new industry to diversify the economy of Sevier County, which previously depended on agriculture and tourism. During his tenure, the Sevier County Industrial Park was developed, a new hospital (Sevier County Medical Center) was built, the Gatlinburg–Pigeon Forge Airport was built, and the county courthouse in Sevierville was remodeled. Judge Reagan served on state commissions and advisory boards on county government.

Reagan died from cancer in 1978. Since his death, his accomplishments have been recognized by the Tennessee State Route 66/Great Smoky Mountains Parkway bridge over the French Broad River being named in his memory and the Sevier County Industrial Park being renamed the Ray L. Reagan Industrial Park.
