= Wilderness at the Smokies =

Resort in Tennessee, United States

- Location within Tennessee

General information
- Location: Sevierville, Tennessee, United States, 1424 Old Knoxville Hwy Gurnee, Tennessee 37876
- Coordinates: 35.894272°N 83.585231°W
- Opening: 2008
- Owner: Wilderness Resort and Waterparks

Technical details
- Floor count: 4

Other information
- Number of rooms: 414
- Number of restaurants: 7

Website
- https://www.wildernessatthesmokies.com

Wilderness at the Smokies is a resort located on Wilderness Territories property in Sevierville, Tennessee. It opened in 2008 as part of the new Bridgemont development, which, along with the resort itself, now includes shopping, dining, and conference facilities.

== Resort development ==
Development of the site included a hotel and outdoor waterpark, which opened on June 26, 2008. The second area opened in December 2008 and offers a condominium resort and indoor waterpark (titled the 'Wild WaterDome', which is one of the largest indoor waterparks in Tennessee). The third area added was the 'Lake Wilderness' outdoor waterpark and became available in May 2009.

In May, 2010, Wilderness Rafting and Catalooche Creek Adventure Golf, at Lake Wilderness, were added.

In December 2023, the addition of a 'water coaster' (developed by WhiteWater West) and lazy river was made within the indoor waterpark. In March 2024, the resort added a rooftop lounge featuring a pool outlooking the general vicinity as well as a bar and cafeteria.

=== Soaky Mountain Waterpark ===
==== Opening ====
On June 27, 2020, Soaky Mountain Waterpark "softly opened" across from the Wilderness resort. Soaky Mountain Waterpark and Wilderness at the Smokies are both owned by the same parent company, Wisconsin-based Wilderness Resorts and Waterparks. Guests staying at the resort receive free admission or can purchase heavily discounted tickets to Soaky Mountain depending on the visit date and the current promotion.

==== History ====
On June 4, 2021, Soaky Mountain Waterpark hosted its official grand opening a year late due to COVID-19.

On July 31, 2021, a shooting occurred in the parking lot of Soaky Mountain Waterpark. The Sevierville Police Department stated that they believed a fight broke out in the waterpark parking lot which then escalated into a shooting. Police were called around 8 p.m. upon arrival, officials said officers found two victims, Kelsy Cook and Angie Russell, with gunshot wounds. Cook was airlifted to UT Medical Center and pronounced dead later that evening, officials said, while Russell’s injury was not life-threatening. Another woman, Angie Lynn Russell, was shot in the leg while attempting to get the gun away from the shooter. The Sevierville Police Department said she was taken to LeConte Medical Center and that her wounds did not appear to be life-threatening. The shooter was identified as Sarah Elizabeth Romine who was arrested on charges of second-degree murder, multiple counts of aggravated assault and possession of a firearm while intoxicated after the incident. Romine later plead guilty to second-degree murder and aggravated assault in Sevier County Circuit Criminal Court. Romine was sentenced to 16 years in prison with no parole for second-degree murder and four years in prison with 30% parole eligibility for aggravated assault.

On June 22, 2022, Soaky Mountain Waterpark opened "The Edge" which was described as a watercoaster that "features a mega drop, kaleidoscope color tunnels, uphill blasts, a zero-G hump and 'Boomerango' walls."

On May 10, 2025, Soaky Mountain Waterpark officially opened "Rafter's Rage", produced by WhiteWater West. It is a six-person raft ride that starts roughly eight stories in the air and spans 825 feet. The ride is capable of reaching speeds of up to 19 miles per hour.

== Local impact ==
Wilderness at the Smokies stands as the largest tax contributor in the city of Sevierville. The resort also reinvests capital back into itself, typically creating new jobs for the community. The resort is also the second largest tourism industry investor in Sevier County, placed right behind Dollywood.

== Waterparks ==
=== Wild WaterDome ===
- 66,000 square feet (6,100 m^{2})
- tan-through roof
- "The Great Wave" - 10,000 square foot wave pool
- "Storm Chaser"(ProSlide Tornado with lighting and sound effects)
- ”Ridge Runner”(WhiteWater West Master Blaster water coaster)
- ”Kaleidoscope Kavern”
- "Smokies Surf Rider" (Flowrider)
- "Washout Mountain" interactive multi-level water play structure with 500 U.S. gallons (1,900 liters) tipping bucket
- "Snapping Turtle Activity Pool" indoor/outdoor activity pool.
- "Magnollia Grove" indoor/outdoor hot tub
- "Trail Twisters Tube Slides" (two enclosed Proslide tube slides)
- "Runaway canyon" Proslide dark Mammoth style enclosed family raft ride with water curtains, more than 450 ft long (140 m), five stories high, featuring a total drop of almost 60 ft (18 m), uses 800 U.S. gallons (3,000 liters) of water per minute.
- "Flying Squirrel Play Area" Toddler area with zero-depth entry, two small side-by-side slides, swing and bounce tree, teeter-totter, tree house that dumps water with a spray feature
- "Grizzly's Grill" Snack Bar
- "Dippin Dots" Stand

=== Salamander Springs ===
- 65,000 square feet (6,000 m^{2}).
- "The Timber Rattler," a 207 ft (63 m) tube slide.
- "The River Otter," a 180 ft (55 m) body slide.
- "Lunker's Landing," an interactive water play structure with 3 slides, tipping bucket, and play-and-spray features.
- "Catfish Corral" activity pool with three basketball hoops.
- "Minnow Marsh," a kiddie zero-depth entry pool.
- "Wildflower Lagoon" hot tub.
- "Cyote Cove" snack bar.
- Back Country arcade and game room.

=== Lake Wilderness ===
- 5 acres (20,000 m^{2}) in size.
- "Washout Wilderness Rapids" wave pool.
- "Catalooche Creek Adventure River" (752 ft (229 m) lazy river).
- "Smoky Mountain Crossing Cabanas" (private poolside cabanas).
- "Catalooche Creek Adventure Golf".
- "The Wall" waterslide.
- Treehouse Springs- A Kids Water Play Area
- Cyclone Racers- 4 Lane Racing Mat Slides
- Wild Vortex- Drop Pod Looping Waterslide

=== Soaky Mountain ===
- American Racer's Rush; A tube slide colored to those of the American Flag.
- Avalaunch; Water coaster with four RocketBlast uphill sections, four saucers, and a final half pipe.
- Black Bear Rapids; Adventure river.
- Blue Mountain Mayhem; A 5-person raft slide with two giant wall elements.
- Boomer's Bay; Collection of children's slides, in many cases miniatures of other attractions.
- Copperhead Clash; A pair of tube slides that race each other through side-by-side sections.
- Cottonmouth Coils; A tube slide with three tight helixes.
- Coyote Springs; Relaxed pool area.
- Hang 10essee; Flowrider.
- Rafter's Rage; A 6-person raft slide featuring WhiteWater West's first-ever Wall Runner zero-gravity curves.
- Rainbow Revenge; A 5-person raft slide featuring multicolored interiors and three saucers.
- Slippery Slamanders; Inflatable obstacle course.
- Soaky Surge; 35,000 square foot wave pool.
- Splash & Furious; A four-lane mat racer.
- The Edge; Duelling master blaster water coasters with transparent half pipe finales.
- The Hive; A water play structure with several slides and features.
- Timber Rattler's Rage; A tube slide with a trio of funnels.
- Whoop & Holler; A pair of thrilling body slides, one of which utilizes a trapdoor capsule and two helixes and the other a steep drop.

== Wilderness Rafting ==
- In May 2010 Wilderness Rafting was added.

== Hotels ==
River Lodge A condominium resort with multi-room suites, the hotel is connected to the Lake Wilderness outdoor waterpark and Wild WaterDome indoor water park.

Stone Hill Lodge The hotel is connected to the Salamander Springs outdoor waterpark and the Sevierville events center. The Stone Hill Lodge has meeting spaces and four-person standard rooms.

== See also ==
- Wilderness Territory
