= East Tennessee Crossing Byway =

National Scenic Byway in East Tennessee

East Tennessee Crossing Byway
- East Tennessee Crossing National Scenic Byway
- The East Tennessee Crossing Byway highlighted in red

Route information
- Maintained by TDOT
- Length: 83 mi (134 km)
- Existed: 2009–present
- Component highways: US 25 / US 70 from the North Carolina state line to Newport; US 25E from Newport to the Kentucky state line

Major junctions
- South end: US 25 / US 70 at the North Carolina state line in Cocke County
- US 321 in Newport; US 25W / US 25E / US 70 in Newport; I-81 in Morristown; US 11E in Morristown; US 11W in Bean Station; US 58 at Cumberland Gap
- North end: US 25E at the Kentucky state line in Cumberland Gap Tunnel near Cumberland Gap

Location
- Country: United States
- State: Tennessee
- Counties: Cocke, Jefferson, Hamblen, Grainger, Claiborne

Highway system
- Scenic Byways; National; National Forest; BLM; NPS; Tennessee State Routes; Interstate; US; State

The East Tennessee Crossing Byway is a 83-mile (134 km) National Scenic Byway in the U.S. state of Tennessee. Established in 2009, it is one of the newest byways in the National Scenic Byway system. The scenic byway traverses mostly along an unsigned concurrency of U.S. Route 25E/State Route 32 (US 25E/SR 32) in East Tennessee.

== Route description ==
The byway begins Cocke County at the Tennessee–North Carolina state line along US 25 in Cherokee National Forest. Northbound, the byway crosses the French Broad River twice before reaching the unincorporated community of Del Rio. Departing Del Rio, the byway crosses the Pigeon River and enters the city of Newport. The byway ends its unsigned concurrency (road) with US 25 and begins its concurrency with US 25E/SR 32. It exits Cocke County and enters Jefferson County after crossing Douglas Lake near the unincorporated community of Leadvale.

The byway then goes through White Pine, until reaching the Interstate 81 (I-81) overpass at exit 8. It then enters Morristown in Hamblen County. In Morristown, the byway connects travelers to the city's central business district, College Square Mall, and Walters State Community College via SR 160 and US 11E (Morris Boulevard, Andrew Johnson Highway). The byway then exits the Morristown–Hamblen area after crossing Cherokee Lake on the Olen R. Marshall Bridge, entering Bean Station in Grainger County.

In Bean Station, the byway gives scenic views of the Mooresburg Valley and Cherokee Lake. Near the town's central business district, the byway is joined with US 11W/SR 1 via trumpet interchange. The concurrency to US 11W continues until reaching Briar Fork Creek at the base of Clinch Mountain, where US 11W splits off and heads west along the Richland Valley towards Knoxville, and the byway northbound into Poor Valley ascending the southern slope of Clinch Mountain.

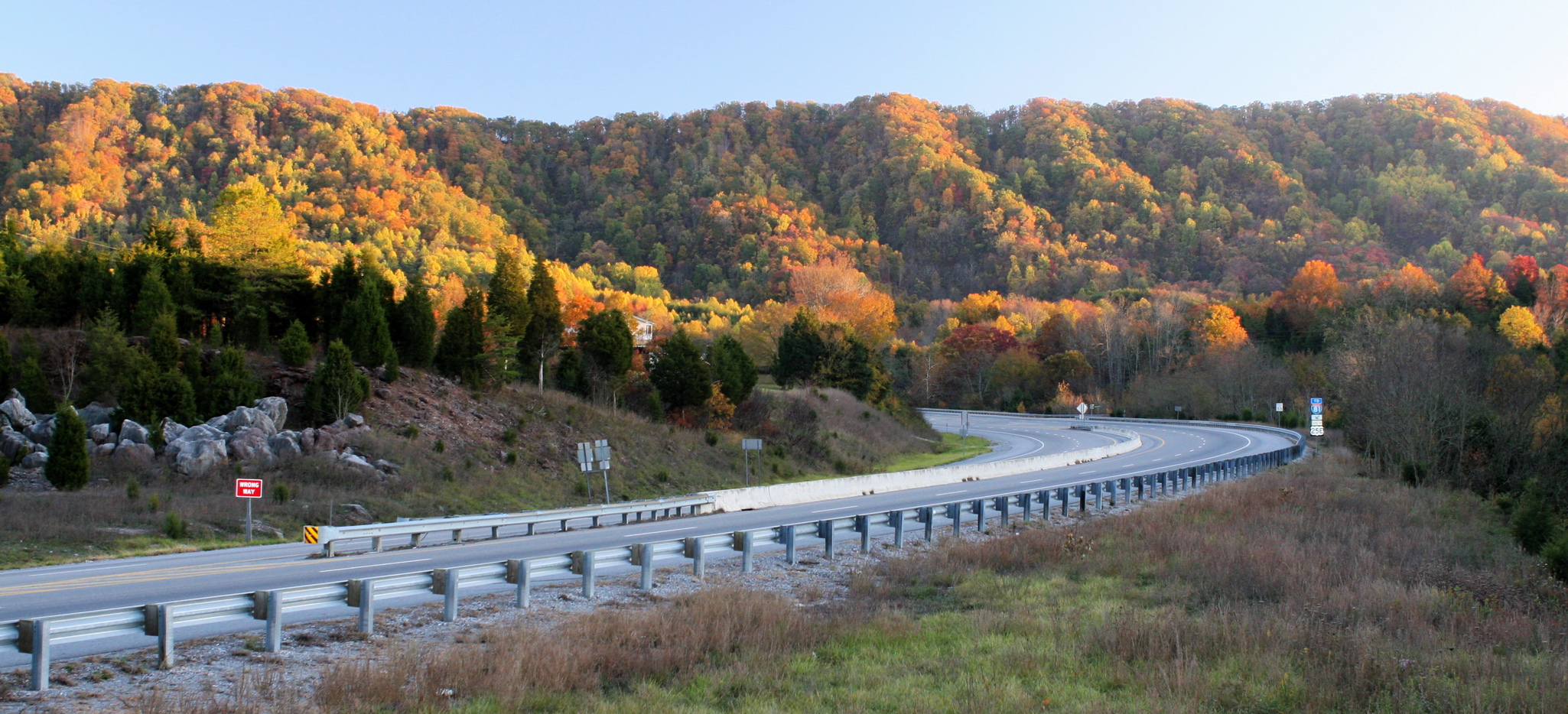
The byway descending down the southern slope Clinch Mountain near Thorn Hill

The byway traverses by a scenic overlook and through Bean Gap before descending down Clinch Mountain's northern slope towards the unincorporated community of Thorn Hill at the intersection of SR 131. After leaving Thorn Hill, the byway crosses over the Clinch River and enters Claiborne County.

In Claiborne County, the byway first enters the unincorporated community of Springdale, winding through the rolling hills of rural Claiborne County before entering Tazewell. In Tazewell, the byway bypasses the town's central business district and heads north. It crosses over the Powell River and enters Harrogate. The byway offers views of the Cumberland Gap, and access to Lincoln Memorial University before exiting Harrogate. It then bypasses the downtown area of Cumberland Gap, and enters the Cumberland Gap Tunnel, where the East Tennessee Crossing Byway ends.

== History ==
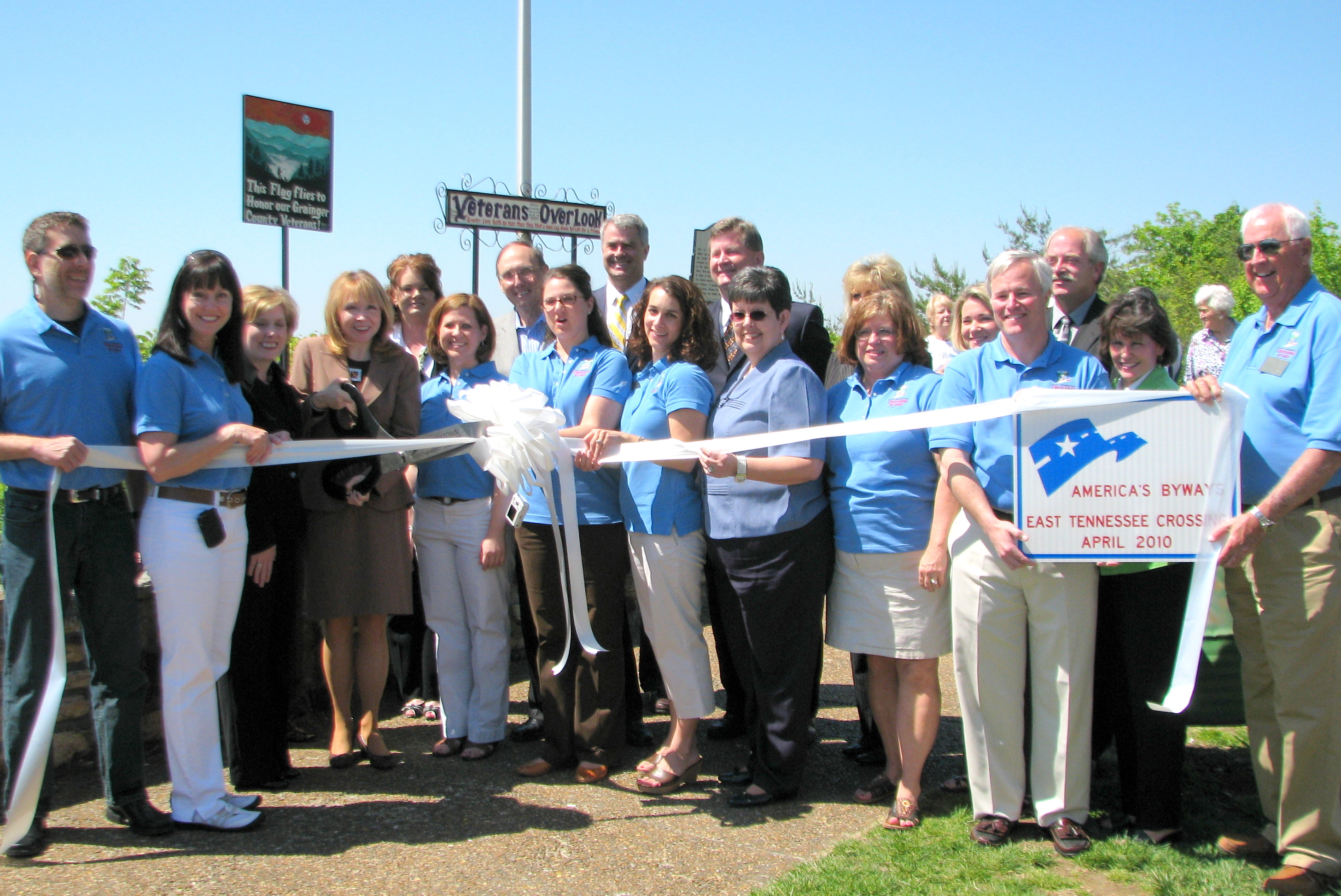
Ribbon cutting of the byway on-top of Clinch Mountain in 2010

What is now the East Tennessee Crossing Byway was supposedly first traversed by Native Americans, long before the area was settled by European pioneers. During this period, the route was considered a part of the Cherokee Warriors' Path. Most notably, the Cumberland Gap to Bean Station section of the route was used as a pathway to Kentucky on famous pioneer and settler, Daniel Boone's Wilderness Road.

In 1915, the Cumberland Gap to Morristown section was designated a part of the Dixie Highway, one of the routes in the National Auto Trail system, which was one of the earliest highway systems developed in the United States.

Throughout the early to mid-20th century, the route from the Cumberland Gap to Tazewell, along with SR 33 from Tazewell to Knoxville, was part of the infamous Thunder Road, which was used by bootleggers to illegally transport and trade moonshine. The story was later fictionally adapted into a 1958 crime-drama film and song of the same name.

Based on the overall historical significance and proximity to historic sites such as the tavern once lived in by Davy Crockett in Morristown, the Battle of Bean's Station site in Grainger County, and the Appalachian Trail in the Cherokee National Forest, many local historians called for US 25E and US 25 to the North Carolina state line to become a scenic byway. After a lengthy nomination and funding process, the efforts proved successful, as the East Tennessee Crossing National Scenic Byway was officially established in late 2009.

== Major intersections ==
| County | Location | mi | km | Destinations | Notes |
|---|---|---|---|---|---|
| Cocke | Cherokee National Forest | 0.0 | 0.0 | US 25 south / US 70 east (NW Hwy 25-70) – Hot Springs | Continuation into North Carolina; southern end of unsigned SR 9 concurrency |
| Cocke | Cherokee National Forest | | | Wolf Creek Bridge over the French Broad River | |
| Cocke | Del Rio | | | SR 107 east – Greeneville | Southern end of SR 107 concurrency |
| Cocke | Del Rio | | | SR 107 west | Northern end of SR 107 concurrency |
| Cocke | Del Rio | | | SR 340 north (Baltimore Road) – Parrottsville | Southern terminus of SR 340 |
| Cocke | Bridgeport | | | Major J.T. Huff Bridge over the French Broad River | |
| Cocke | Newport | | | SR 73 south (Wilton Springs Road) – Cosby | Northern terminus of SR 73 |
| Cocke | Newport | | | John W. Fisher Bridge over the Pigeon River | |
| Cocke | Newport | | | US 321 north (North Street/SR 35) – Greeneville | Southern end of US 321/SR 35 concurrency |
| Cocke | Newport | | | US 321 south / SR 32 south (Cosby Highway) – Cosby, Gatlinburg | Southern end of SR 32 concurrency; northern end of US 321 concurrency |
| Cocke | Newport | | | US 25E north (Dixie Highway/SR 32) / US 25W north / US 70 west (W Broadway Street/SR 9/SR 35) – White Pine, Morristown, Dandridge | Northern end of SR 32 concurrency; US 25 splits into US 25W and US 25E |
| Douglas Lake/French Broad River | | | | J. W. Walters Bridge | |
| Jefferson | Leadvale | | | Nina Road – Baneberry | Access road into Baneberry |
| Jefferson | White Pine | | | SR 341 west (Old Airport Road) – Talbott | Eastern terminus of SR 341 |
| Jefferson | White Pine | | | SR 113 south (Main Street) – Dandridge | Southern end of SR 113 concurrency |
| Hamblen | Morristown | | | I-81 – Knoxville, Bristol | I-81 Exit 8 |
| Hamblen | Morristown | | | SR 343 north (Newport Highway) – Downtown | Southern terminus of SR 343 |
| Hamblen | Morristown | | | SR 113 north – Whitesburg | Northern end of SR 113 concurrency |
| Hamblen | Morristown | | | SR 160 (Enka Highway) | Southern end of freeway; interchange |
| Hamblen | Morristown | | | College Square Drive/College Park Drive | Interchange |
| Hamblen | Morristown | | | US 11E south (Morris Boulevard/SR 34 west) – Morristown, Jefferson City | Southern end of US 11E/SR 34 concurrency; interchange |
| Hamblen | Morristown | | | US 11E north (East A.J. Highway/SR 34 east/SR 66) – Greeneville, Morristown | Northern end of US 11E/SR 34 concurrency; northern end of freeway; interchange |
| Hamblen | Morristown | | | SR 343 south (Buffalo Trail) – Morristown Central Business District | interchange; northern terminus of SR 343; southbound exit and northbound entrance; missing movements signed on Cherokee Park Road |
| Cherokee Lake/Holston River | | | | Olen R. Marshall Memorial Bridge | |
| Grainger | Bean Station | | | SR 375 south (Lakeshore Drive) – German Creek, Cherokee | Northern terminus of SR 375 |
| Grainger | Bean Station | | | US 11W north (New Lee Highway/SR 1 east) – Rogersville, Kingsport | Southern end of US 11W/SR 1 concurrency; interchange |
| Grainger | Bean Station | | | US 11W south (Lee Highway/SR 1 west) – Rutledge, Knoxville | Northern end of US 11W/SR 1 concurrency; interchange |
| Grainger | Thorn Hill | | | SR 131 (Mountain Valley Highway 131) – Washburn, Treadway | |
| Claiborne | Springdale | | | SR 33 north – Sneedville | Southern end of SR 33 concurrency |
| Claiborne | Tazewell | | | SR 33 south (N Broad Street) – New Tazewell, Maynardville | Northern end of SR 33 concurrency |
| Claiborne | Tazewell | | | SR 345 north (Cedar Fork Road) | Southern terminus of SR 345 |
| Claiborne | Powell River | | | Powell River Bridge | |
| Claiborne | Harrogate | | | SR 63 east (Forge Ridge Road) – Hopewell, Sneedville | Southern end of SR 63 concurrency |
| Claiborne | Harrogate | | | SR 63 west (Appalachian Development Corridor F) – Arthur, Speedwell, Fincastle, LaFollette | Northern end of SR 63 concurrency |
| Claiborne | Cumberland Gap | | | US 58 east (Wilderness Road/SR 383 east) – Cumberland Gap, TN, Jonesville, VA | Interchange; eastern terminus of US 58/SR 383. Continuation into Kentucky; Northern end of unsigned US 25E/SR 32 concurrency |
| Claiborne | Cumberland Gap National Historical Park | | | Cumberland Gap Tunnel | |
1.000 mi = 1.609 km; 1.000 km = 0.621 mi: Concurrency terminus; Incomplete access; Route transition
