= Tennessee State Route 66 =

State highway in Tennessee, United States

State Route 66
- SR 66; primary in red, secondary in blue, unsigned in green

Route information
- Maintained by TDOT
- Length: 86.25 mi (138.81 km)
- Existed: October 1, 1923–present

Major junctions
- South end: US 441 / US 411 at Sevierville
- I-40 near Kodak; US 25W / US 70 at Dandridge; SR 160 near Morristown; US 11E at Morristown; US 11W at Rogersville
- North end: SR 31 / SR 33 at Sneedville

Location
- Country: United States
- State: Tennessee
- Counties: Sevier, Jefferson, Hamblen, Hawkins, Hancock

Highway system
- Tennessee State Routes; Interstate; US; State
| ← SR 65 | → SR 67 |

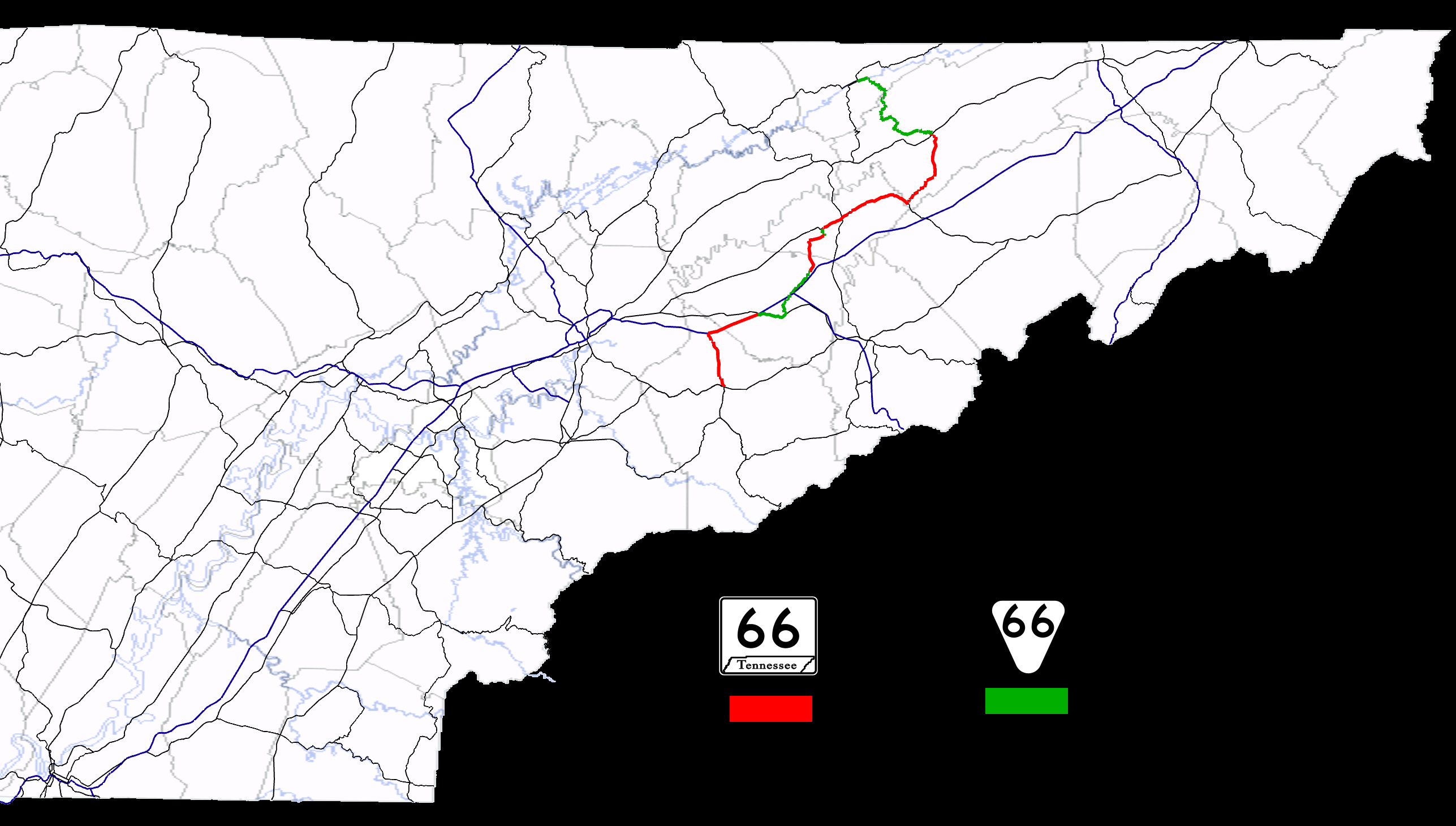
State Route 66 highlighted

State Route 66 (SR 66) is a state-maintained highway in eastern Tennessee, including a six-lane divided highway known as Winfield Dunn Parkway in Sevier County that is part of the Great Smoky Mountains Parkway, a four-lane expressway in Hamblen and Jefferson counties and a two-lane rural collector through mountainous terrain continuing to the northeast terminus in Hancock County.

== Route description ==
=== Sevier County ===
SR 66 begins as a primary highway in Sevier County in Sevierville at an intersection with US 441/US 411/SR 35/SR 71 (Chapman Highway/Forks of the River Parkway/Main Street) in downtown as part of the longer Great Smoky Mountains Parkway. The highway goes north as a 6-lane parkway designated as Winfield Dunn Parkway, named for Governor Winfield Dunn, to leave downtown and cross a bridge over the Little Pigeon River to have an intersection with SR 448 (North Parkway). This road effectively serves as the eastern branch of the parkway around downtown. The highway then becomes divided at the intersection with Allensville Road and continues north through a long major business district and has a concurrency with SR 338 (Douglas Dam Road/Boyds Creek Highway) in the Cattlettsburg community before crossing a bridge over the French Broad River to leave Sevierville and enter the Kodak community. It continues past some more businesses before having an intersection with SR 139 (Douglas Dam Road) before passing some more businesses and coming to a diverging diamond interchange with I-40 (Exit 407). Here, SR 66 becomes unsigned and turns east to become concurrent with I-40 while the road continues north as Snyder Road to US 25W/US 70/SR 9.

This entire 6-lane section of SR 66 between US 441/411 and I-40 is a popular route for tourists traveling to the Great Smoky Mountains National Park as it is also part of the main road that connects to the park. As a result, it is one of the heaviest-traveled non-Interstate Highways in Tennessee.

I-40/SR 66 go east as a 6-lane freeway and cross into Jefferson County shortly afterwards.

=== Jefferson County ===
I-40/SR 66 go east through farmland and have an interchange with Deep Springs Road (Exit 412) before coming to an interchange with US 25W/US 70/SR 9 (Exit 415). Here, while SR 66 still remains unsigned, it turns secondary and leaves I-40 to go east, concurrent with US 25W/US 70/SR 9, and enters Dandridge. The highway passes through farmland as a 2-lane highway before becoming concurrent with SR 92 as they enter downtown. The highway then passes several businesses before SR 92 splits off in the center of town. After passing through some neighborhoods, SR 66 becomes signed as it splits off from US 25W/US 70/SR 9 to the northeast and leaves Dandridge as Valley Home Road. The highway continues through farmland as it parallels and crosses under I-40 without an interchange, eventually passing just north of the I-40/I-81 interchange and begins paralleling I-81. SR 66 then passes through White Pine, where it has an intersection with SR 341 (Roy Messer Highway), turns primary again, and becomes a four-lane expressway towards the Hamblen County line.

=== Hamblen County ===
SR 66 continues through rural unincorporated Hamblen County as a four-lane expressway with median crossings restricted to U-turns, and has an intersection with SR 342 before entering Morristown providing access to West View Middle School and a diamond interchange with SR 160. SR 66 then becomes a five-lane urban connector route known as Merchants Greene Boulevard (formerly part of SR 474) where it continues through a commercial-oriented area of West Morristown until reaching the intersection of US 11E/SR 34 (Andrew Johnson Highway), turning secondary once more. The highway then travels east along an unsigned concurrency with Andrew Johnson Highway, turning secondary again, where it continues until the intersection of US 11E/SR 34 and Morris Boulevard, where SR 66 maintains its concurrency along Andrew Johnson Highway and becomes First North Street while US 11E/SR 34 follows Morris Boulevard. It then passes by several more businesses before having an intersection with SR 343 (Cumberland Street) in the center of the city, where SR 66 becomes E 1st North Street. SR 66 then leaves downtown and continues east as a 4-lane undivided highway (Andrew Johnson Highway) as it passes through neighborhoods before having an interchange with Liberty Hill Road, just before having an interchange with US 25E/US 11E/SR 32/SR 34. Here, SR 66 again becomes concurrent with US 11E/SR 34 (US 25E/SR 32 Exit 2B). The highway then leaves Morristown as a 4-lane divided highway and passes through Russellville as it narrows to 2-lanes and has an intersection with SR 344. US 11E/SR 34/SR 66 then continue northeast through farmland to pass through Whitesburg and have an extremely short concurrency with SR 113 before crossing into Hawkins County.

=== Hawkins County ===
US 11E/SR 34/SR 66 continue northeast through farmland to Bulls Gap, where SR 66 separates from US 11E/SR 34 for the final time as it turns north as a primary highway to leave Bulls Gap and continues through farmland. SR 66 then passes through some hilly terrain before having another intersection with SR 113 and entering Persia. It then becomes concurrent with SR 70 (Trail of the Lonesome Pine) before leaving Persia and continuing north through farmland. They then have an intersection with Old Highway 70 before crossing the Hugh B Day Bridge over Cherokee Lake/Holston River and entering Rogersville. They pass by several businesses before curving to the west and have a partial interchange with West Main Street. They then come to an interchange with US 11W/SR 1, where SR 70 splits off and turns northeast on US 11W/SR 1 while SR 66 turns secondary, becoming extremely narrow and curvy as it leaves Rogersville and enters mountainous terrain. SR 66 then passes through farmland again for a short distance before reentering the mountains to have an intersection with SR 94 before crossing into Hancock County.

=== Hancock County ===
SR 66 curves and winds its way through several miles of mountainous terrain before coming to an intersection with SR 31 just south of Sneedville. It then turns right and crosses a bridge over the Clinch River before coming to an end at an intersection with SR 33 just south of downtown.

== History ==
SR 66 originally followed SR 338 and SR 139 between Catlettsburg and Dandridge. It was relocated onto the unsigned concurrency with I-40 and the parkway between Catlettsburg and I-40 after I-40 was completed in 1975.

In 1987, a widening project began to convert then two-laned SR 66 to a four lane road beginning at I-40 exit 407 and ending at Sevierville at the junction of US 441 and US 411. This project was finished by 1988.

A widening project was recently completed on SR 66 from I-40 to Chapman Highway/Main Street/Forks of the River Parkway (US 441/US 411). It was divided into three separate sections, each of which was expanded at different times. It expanded the four-lane divided highway to a six-lane divided highway. The section closest to Sevierville was expanded first. This section stretched from Boyds Creek Highway (SR 338) to Nichols Street and began on July 15, 2009, and was completed on November 18, 2011. The second section from I-40 to Douglas Dam Road (SR 139) began in September 2010, and was completed in November 2012. The middle section from Douglas Dam Road to Boyds Creek Highway began in March 2012 and was completed in the summer of 2016, after multiple delays.

In 2013, construction work began on a relocated SR 66 from the intersection of SR 474 and SR 160 in West Morristown, connecting the city to Interstate 81 exit 4 in White Pine. The project was completed in November 2020.

== Junction list ==
| County | Location | mi | km | Destinations | Notes |
|---|---|---|---|---|---|
| Sevier | Sevierville | 0.0 | 0.0 | US 411 / US 441 (West Main Street / Forks of the River Parkway / Chapman Highway / SR 35 / SR 71) – Pigeon Forge, Gatlinburg, Newport, Seymour, Cherokee | Southern terminus; SR 66 begins as a primary highway |
| Sevier | Sevierville | | | Bridge over the Little Pigeon River | |
| Sevier | Sevierville | | | SR 448 south (North Parkway) – Downtown Sevierville | Northern terminus of SR 448 |
| Sevier | Sevierville | | | SR 338 north (Douglas Dam Road) – Douglas Dam | Southern end of concurrency with SR 338 |
| Sevier | Sevierville | | | SR 338 south (Boyds Creek Highway) – Boyds Creek, Seymour | Northern end of concurrency with SR 338 |
| Sevier | Sevierville–Kodak line | | | Bridge over the French Broad River | |
| Sevier | Kodak | | | SR 139 (Douglas Dam Road) – Dandridge, Kodak | |
| Sevier | Kodak | | | I-40 west – Knoxville | Begin unsigned concurrency with I-40; Road continues northward as Winfield Dunn Parkway; Diverging diamond interchange; I-40 Exit 407 |
| Jefferson | | | | Deep Springs Road – Douglas Dam | I-40 exit 412 |
| Jefferson | | | | I-40 east – Asheville US 25W north / US 70 west (SR 9) – Dandridge, Strawberry Plains | End unsigned concurrency with I-40, Begin unsigned concurrency with US 25W/US 70/SR 9; SR 66 turns secondary; I-40 Exit 415 |
| Jefferson | Dandridge | | | SR 92 north – Jefferson City | Begin concurrency with SR 92, from here on the concurrency is signed |
| Jefferson | Dandridge | | | SR 92 south (Gay Street) to SR 139 (West Main Street) – Chestnut Hill | End concurrency with SR 92 |
| Jefferson | Dandridge | | | US 25W south / US 70 east (SR 9) – Newport | End concurrency with US 25W/US 70/SR 9 |
| Jefferson | White Pine | | | SR 341 east (Roy Messer Highway) to I-81 – White Pine | Begin short concurrency with SR 341 |
| Jefferson | White Pine | | | SR 341 west (White Pine Road) – Talbott | End short concurrency with SR 341, SR 66 turns primary |
| Hamblen | | | | SR 342 west (Alpha-Valley Home Road) | Eastern terminus of SR 342 |
| Hamblen | Morristown | | | SR 160 (Air Park Boulevard) – Jefferson City, Lowland | Interchange, northern end of expressway |
| Hamblen | Morristown | | | US 11E south (West Andrew Johnson Highway/SR 34) | Begin concurrency with US 11E/SR 34; SR 66 turns secondary |
| Hamblen | Morristown | | | US 11E north (West Morris Blvd/SR 34) | End concurrency with US 11E/SR 34; US 11E/SR 34 turn right and SR 66 continues straight. |
| Hamblen | Morristown | | | SR 343 (Cumberland Street) | |
| Hamblen | Morristown | | | Liberty Hill Road | Interchange |
| Hamblen | Morristown | | | US 11E south (SR 34) / US 25E (SR 32) – Newport, Bean Station | Interchange; Begin concurrency with US 11E/SR 34 |
| Hamblen | Russellville | | | SR 344 north (Old Russellville Pike) – Saint Clair | Southern terminus of SR 344 |
| Hamblen | Whitesburg | | | SR 113 (Simpson Road / Silver City Road) – White Pine, Saint Clair | Very short 46 ft concurrency with SR 113 |
| Hawkins | Bulls Gap | | | US 11E north (SR 34) – Mosheim, Greeneville | End concurrency with US 11E/SR 34; SR 66 becomes primary |
| Hawkins | Persia | | | SR 113 south – Saint Clair | Northern terminus of SR 113 |
| Hawkins | Persia | | | SR 70 south (Trail of the Lonesome Pine) – Greeneville | Begin concurrency with SR 70 |
| Hawkins | | | | Hugh B Day Bridge over Cherokee Lake/Holston River | |
| Hawkins | Rogersville | | | West Main Street – Downtown Rogersville | Interchange; no southbound access |
| Hawkins | Rogersville | | | US 11W / SR 70 north (SR 1) – Bean Station, Church Hill | interchange; End concurrency with SR 70; SR 66 turns secondary |
| Hawkins | | | | SR 94 east – Pressmen's Home | Western terminus of SR 94 |
| Hancock | Sneedville | | | SR 31 south – Mooresburg | Southern end SR 31 concurrenc |
| Hancock | Sneedville | | | Hancock County Veterans Memorial Bridge over Clinch River | |
| Hancock | Sneedville | 86.25 | 138.81 | SR 33 – Tazewell, Sneedville | Northern terminus of both SR 31 and SR 66; SR 66 ends as a secondary highway |
1.000 mi = 1.609 km; 1.000 km = 0.621 mi: Concurrency terminus; Incomplete access
