= Tennessee State Route 32 =

State unsigned highway in Tennessee

State Route 32
- SR 32; primary in red, secondary in blue, unsigned in green

Route information
- Maintained by TDOT
- Length: 89.4 mi (143.9 km)
- Existed: October 1, 1923–present

Major junctions
- South end: Mount Sterling Road at the North Carolina state line in Cocke County
- US 321 at Cosby; Foothills Parkway at Cosby; US 25 / US 70 at Newport; US 25W / US 25E at Newport; I-81 at White Pine; US 11E / SR 66 at Morristown; US 11W at Bean Station; US 58 at Cumberland Gap
- North end: US 25E at the Kentucky state line in the Cumberland Gap Tunnel at Cumberland Gap

Location
- Country: United States
- State: Tennessee
- Counties: Cocke, Jefferson, Hamblen, Grainger, Claiborne

Highway system
- Tennessee State Routes; Interstate; US; State
← SR 31	→ SR 33

State Route 32 (SR 32) is a state highway in East Tennessee. For most of its route, it is an unsigned companion route concurrent with U.S. Route 25E (US 25E). The highway stretches 89 miles (143 km) from the North Carolina state line to the Tennessee-Kentucky state line near the town of Cumberland Gap.

From the junction with US 25W/US 70 in Newport to the Kentucky-Tennessee state line at the Cumberland Gap, SR 32 is designated as the East Tennessee Crossing Byway, a National Scenic Byway. SR 32 is also designated as Appalachian Development Highway System (ADHS) Corridor S. The corridor follows SR 32 between Interstate 81 (I-81) in Morristown and SR 63 (ADHS Corridor F) in Harrogate.

== Route description ==
=== Cocke County ===
SR 32 begins as a paved continuation of a North Carolina secondary highway (Mt. Sterling Road, a narrow gravel road), in the Cherokee National Forest in Cocke County, at the Tennessee-North Carolina state line, just north of Great Smoky Mountains National Park. SR 32 winds its way west through the Appalachian Mountains, along the southern border of the forest, for 11 miles (18 km), where it crosses the Appalachian Trail, before leaving the mountains and entering town of Cosby. Here it comes to an intersection and becomes concurrent with US 321/SR 73. Many compare this stretch of SR 32 to the Tail of the Dragon due to its many curves and switchbacks.

The highway turns north as it passes by several homes and businesses, while having intersections with the Foothills Parkway and with SR 339, just a few hundred feet from each other. Leaving Cosby, the three routes head north through farmland to an intersection with Wilton Springs Road, where SR 73 splits off to the east toward I-40. SR 32/US 321 continues through farmland as a newly improved 2-lane highway before entering Newport and widening to a 4-lane divided highway, just before turning east and having an interchange with I-40 (Exit 435).

SR 32/US 321 then runs through a heavily congested retail area and becomes undivided. Upon entering downtown, it junctions with US 70/US 25/SR 9 (W Broadway Street), where US 321 splits off and goes east into downtown while SR 32 becomes unsigned and concurrent with US 25/US 70/SR 9 west. They then pass by several businesses before coming to the US 25 split for US 25W/US 25E, where SR 32 splits off to follow US 25E north and they leave Newport as a 2-lane highway. This concurrency continues through countryside before crossing the J. W. Walters Bridge over Douglas Lake/French Broad River and enter Jefferson County.

=== Jefferson County ===
US 25E/SR 32 continues north through countryside and farmland to enter White Pine along State Street, and has an intersection with SR 341. These concurrent highways then pass by several homes and businesses before becoming concurrent with SR 113, which provides access to downtown. US 25E, SR 32, and SR 113 then leave White Pine and continue north through farmland and crosses into Hamblen County.

=== Hamblen County ===
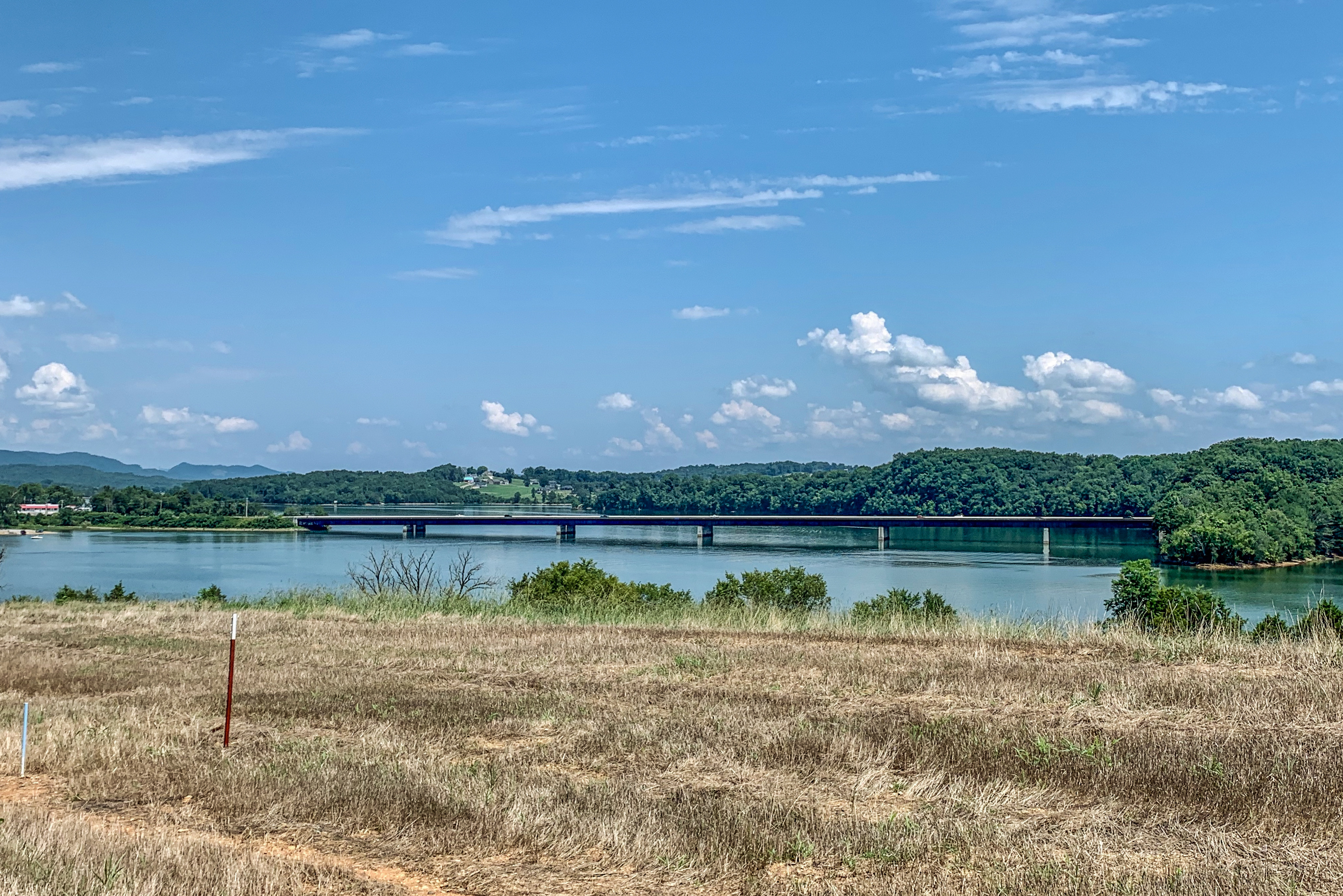
Olen R. Marshall Bridge connecting SR 32 to Bean Station and Morristown

The highway then widens to a 4-lane divided highway shortly before having an interchange with I-81 (Exit 8). The highway then enters Morristown and passes through an industrial area and has an intersection with SR 343, shortly before SR 113 splits off to the northeast. US 25E/SR 32 then bypass downtown to the east through wooded areas as it becomes a freeway and has its first interchange with SR 160 (Exit 1). The freeway then continues to an interchange with Crockett Square Drive/Walter State CC Drive (Exit 1A; provides access to Walters State Community College and a large retail area). Shortly afterwards they become concurrent with US 11E/SR 34 (Morris Boulevard) at Exit 2A, which quickly ends at Exit 2B with SR 66 (Andrew Johnson Highway). US 25E/SR 32 then downgrade to a divided highway as it passes through several neighborhoods before having an interchange with SR 343, just before crossing the Olen R. Marshall Memorial Bridge over Cherokee Lake/Holston River, where they leave Morristown and cross into Grainger County.

=== Grainger County ===
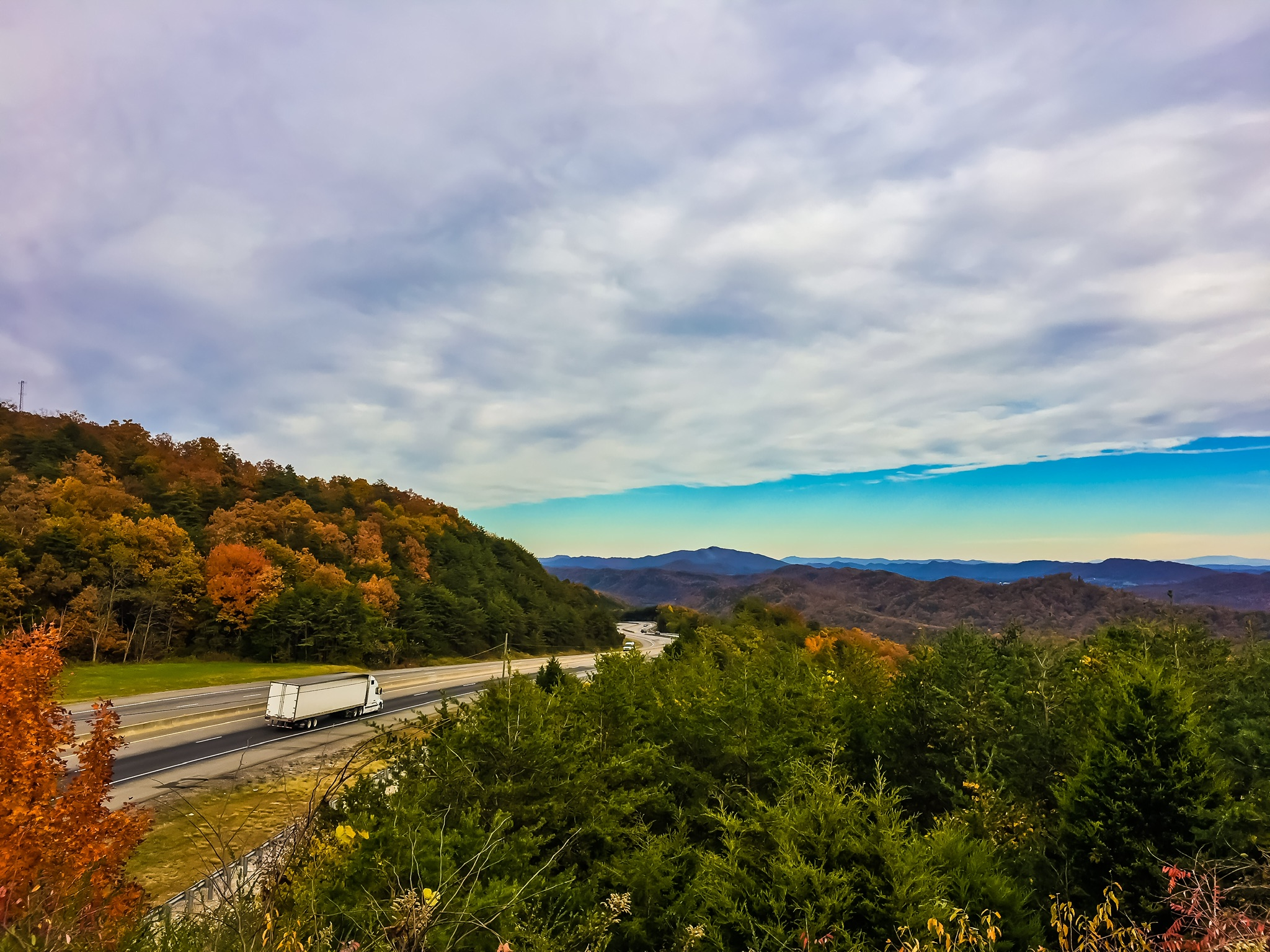
Tennessee State Route 32 descending the southern slope of Clinch Mountain in Grainger County towards Bean Station.

US 25E/SR 32 continues north past several lakefront homes and businesses before entering Bean Station and having a junction with SR 375 (Lakeshore Road). It then bypasses downtown, to the west, and has an interchange and becomes concurrent with US 11W/SR 1. It then curves to the west and passes by several homes and businesses before coming to another interchange, where US 11W/SR 1 splits off to the west while US 25E/SR 32 curves back to the north and leaves Bean Station. The highway then curves through, and climbs to, the crest of the Clinch Mountain range, just before entering Thorn Hill, where it intersects with SR 131. The highway then continues north to cross a bridge over the Clinch River and crosses into Claiborne County.

=== Claiborne County ===
US 25E/SR 32 then becomes undivided and gains a center turn as they turn northwest, where they join and begin an unsigned wrong-way concurrency with SR 33, just after crossing an arm of Norris Lake (Big Sycamore Creek). The highway then continues through countryside and farmland to the community of Springdale before curving around through a gap between two ridges and entering Tazewell. They bypass downtown to the east side before coming to an intersection with N Broad Street just on the north side, where SR 33 and goes south towards downtown and New Tazewell while US 25E/SR 32 turn north again. They have an intersection with SR 345 shortly afterwards before passing by several businesses before leaving Tazewell not too long afterwards.

Traveling northwest out of Tazewell, US 25E/SR 32 passes through countryside and farmland to cross the Powell River before becoming divided, shortly before entering Harrogate and have a junction, and brief concurrency with SR 63, shortly before passing by Lincoln Memorial University and going through downtown. The highway then leaves Harrogate and crosses a ridge before entering the town of Cumberland Gap, where they bypass downtown to the southwest and have an interchange with US 58/SR 383. The highway then continues north to the Cumberland Gap Tunnel at the Tennessee-Kentucky state line, where SR 32 ends and US 25E continues north into Kentucky.

== Major intersections ==
County	Location	mi	km	Exit	Destinations	Notes
Cocke	Cherokee National Forest	0.0	0.0		Mount Sterling Road	North Carolina state line; southern terminus; continues south as a gravel road; SR 32 begins as a secondary highway
Cocke	Cosby	11.25	18.11		US 321 south (Hooper Highway/SR 73 west) – Gatlinburg, Great Smoky Mountains National Park	Southern end of US 321/SR 73 concurrency; SR 32 becomes a primary highway
Cocke	Cosby	12.75	20.52		Foothills Parkway east to I-40	Current western end of section 8A of the Foothills Parkway
Cocke	Cosby	13.2	21.2		SR 339 west (Jones Cove Road) – Cherokee Hills	Eastern terminus of SR 339
Cocke		18	29		SR 73 north (Wilton Springs Road) to I-40	Northern end of SR 73 concurrency
Cocke	Newport	23.75	38.22		I-40 – Knoxville, Asheville	I-40 exit 435
Cocke	Newport				US 25 south / US 70 east / US 321 north (E Broadway Street/SR 9 east/SR 35 north) – Downtown, Greeneville, Hot Springs, NC	Northern end of US 321 concurrency; southern end of US 25/US 70/SR 9/SR 35 concurrency; SR 32 becomes unsigned
Cocke	Newport				US 25E begins / US 25W north / US 70 west (W Broadway Street/SR 9 west/SR 35 south) – Dandridge, Sevierville	US 25 splits into US 25W/US 25E; northern end of US 70/SR 9/SR 35 concurrency; southern end of US 25E concurrency
Douglas Lake/French Broad River				J. W. Walters Bridge over Douglas Lake/French Broad River		
Jefferson					Nina Road - Baneberry	Access road into Baneberry
Jefferson	White Pine				SR 341 west (Old Airport Road) – Talbott	Eastern terminus of SR 341
Jefferson	White Pine				SR 113 south (Main Street) – Dandridge	Southern end of SR 113 concurrency
Hamblen					I-81 – Knoxville, Bristol	I-81 exit 8
Hamblen	Morristown				SR 343 north (Newport Highway) – Downtown	Southern terminus of SR 343; former route of US 25E/SR 32
Hamblen	Morristown				SR 113 north – Whitesburg	Northern end of SR 113 concurrency
Hamblen	Morristown			1	SR 160 (Enka Highway)	south end of freeway; southern beltway around downtown and connector to I-81
Hamblen	Morristown			1A	College Square Drive/College Park Drive	
Hamblen	Morristown			2A	US 11E south (Morris Boulevard/SR 34 west) – Downtown	Southern end of US 11E/SR 34 concurrency
Hamblen	Morristown			2B	US 11E north (Andrew Johnson Highway/SR 34 east/SR 66) – Downtown, Greeneville	Northern end of US 11E/SR 34 concurrency; north end of freeway
Hamblen	Morristown				SR 343 south (Buffalo Trail) – Downtown	Northern terminus of SR 343; interchange; southbound exit and northbound entrance; missing movements signed on Cherokee Park Road
Cherokee Lake/Holston River				Olen R. Marshall Memorial Bridge over Cherokee Lake/Holston River		
Grainger	Bean Station				SR 375 south (Lakeshore Drive) – Cherokee	Northern terminus of SR 375
Grainger	Bean Station				US 11W north (New Lee Highway/SR 1 east) – Rogersville	Interchange; southern end of wrong-way US 11W/SR 1 concurrency
Grainger	Bean Station				US 11W south (Lee Highway/SR 1 west) – Rutledge	Interchange; northern end of wrong-way US 11W/SR 1 concurrency
Grainger	Thorn Hill				SR 131 (Mountain Valley Highway 131) – Washburn, Treadway	
Clinch River				Bridge over the Clinch River		
Claiborne				Bridge over arm of Norris Lake		
Claiborne					SR 33 north – Sneedville	Southern end of wrong-way SR 33 concurrency
Claiborne	Tazewell				SR 33 south (N Broad Street) – New Tazewell, Maynardville	Northern end of SR 33 wrong-way concurrency
Claiborne	Tazewell				SR 345 north (Cedar Fork Road)	Southern terminus of SR 345
Claiborne				Bridge over the Powell River		
Claiborne	Harrogate				SR 63 east (Forge Ridge Road) – Sneedville	Southern end of SR 63 concurrency
Claiborne	Harrogate				SR 63 west (Appalachian Highway) – Arthur, Speedwell, Fincastle, LaFollette	Northern end of SR 63 concurrency
Claiborne	Cumberland Gap				US 58 east (Wilderness Road/SR 383 east) – Jonesville, VA	Western terminus of US 58/SR 383
Claiborne	Cumberland Gap National Historical Park	89.4	143.9		US 25E north – Middlesboro	Cumberland Gap Tunnel; Kentucky state line; northern terminus of SR 32; US 25E continues north into Kentucky; SR 32 ends as an unsigned primary highway
1.000 mi = 1.609 km; 1.000 km = 0.621 mi: Concurrency terminus; Incomplete access; Route transition
