= Tennessee State Route 113 =

State highway in Tennessee, United States

State Route 113
- SR 113 highlighted in red

Route information
- Maintained by TDOT
- Length: 32.3 mi (52.0 km)

Major junctions
- South end: US 25W / US 70 near Dandridge
- I-40 near Dandridge; US 25E in White Pine; I-81 in White Pine; US 11E in Whitesburg
- North end: SR 66 in Persia

Location
- Country: United States
- State: Tennessee
- Counties: Jefferson, Hamblen, Hawkins

Highway system
- Tennessee State Routes; Interstate; US; State
← SR 112	→ SR 114

State Route 113 (SR 113) is a north–south state highway in East Tennessee.

== Route description ==
=== Jefferson County ===
SR 113 begins as a 2-lane highway in Jefferson County east of Dandridge at an intersection with US 25W/US 70/SR 9. It then heads north and immediately has an interchange with I-40 (Exit 424). It then parallels Douglas Lake for a couple of miles before curving to the north, where it has an intersection with Nina Road, a major county road providing access to Baneberry. The highway then continues north through farmland to White Pine, where it has an intersection with SR 341. SR 113 then continues through the center of town to intersect and become concurrent with US 25E/SR 32, shortly before they cross into Hamblen County.

=== Hamblen County ===
US 25E/SR 32/SR 113 continue north to leave White Pine and go through farmland to come to an interchange with I-81 (Exit 8), where it widens to a 4-lane divided highway and enters Morristown. They continue through some industrial and rural areas to an intersection with SR 343, just shortly before SR 113 breaks off from US 25E/SR 32 as a 2-lane highway to leave Morristown and continue northeast. SR 113 continues through farmland for a few miles before having an intersection with SR 160. It continues through rolling hills and farmland to have an intersection with SR 340. The highway then turns north and winds its way into Whitesburg, where it has a very short concurrency with US 11E/SR 34/SR 66. SR 113 then continues north and crosses into Hawkins County.

=== Hawkins County ===
SR 113 winds its way through farmland and has a long concurrency with SR 344 to Saint Clair, where they split and SR 113 turns east. SR 113 then wind and curves its way east through farmland to come to an end at a y-intersection with SR 66 in Persia, just south of its intersection with SR 70.

== History ==
The current route of SR 113 is the second state route in Tennessee to bear this designation. The first SR 113 was established around 1931 or 1932 in Sequatchie County between SR 27 in Glendale and SR 28 south of Dunlap. This route later became part of US 127. In 1939 or 1940, this SR 113 was replaced as part of SR 8.

The present-day SR 113 was established in May 1966 as a renumbering of two separate routes that were designated SR 66A. The numbering change was requested by area residents due to confusion with SR 66. This route was established as an alternate route of SR 66 between 1931 and 1932, and ran between US 11E in Whitesburg and SR 66 in Persia. In around 1953 or 1954, SR 66 was renumbered SR 66A between US 25W/70 in Dandridge and US 25E in White Pine.

Around 1967, SR 113 was truncated to its current northern terminus at SR 66. On July 1, 1983, as part of a statewide highway renumbering that year, SR 113 was rerouted between south of Morristown and Whitesburg; portions of the old route became SR 343 and SR 344.

== Junction list ==
County	Location	mi	km	Destinations	Notes
Jefferson		0.0	0.0	US 25W / US 70 (SR 9) – Dandridge, Newport	Southern terminus
Jefferson				I-40 – Knoxville, Asheville	I-40 exit 424
Jefferson				Nina Road – Baneberry	
Jefferson				SR 341 (Roy Messer Highway, Old Airport Road) to I-81 – Talbott	Access to I-81 via SR 341 west
Jefferson				US 25E south (State Street/SR 32 south) – Morristown, Newport	Southern end of concurrency with US 25E/SR 32
Hamblen				I-81 – Bristol, Knoxville	I-81 exit 8
Hamblen			SR 343 north (South Cumberland Street) – Downtown Morristown	Old US Hwy. 25E; southern terminus of SR 343	
Hamblen				US 25E north (SR 32 north) – Bean Station, Tazewell	Northern end of concurrency with US 25E/SR 32
Hamblen				SR 160 to I-81 – Morristown, Newport	Access to I-81 via SR 160 south
Hamblen				SR 340 south (Fish Hatchery Road) – Warrensburg, Parrottsville	Northern terminus of SR 340
Hamblen				US 11E (E Andrew Johnson Highway/SR 34/SR 66) – Morristown, Russellville, Bulls Gap, Mosheim, Greeneville	Very brief 46 ft concurrency
Hawkins				SR 344 south (Saint Clair Road) – Russellville	Southern end of concurrency with SR 344
Hawkins				SR 344 north (Melinda Ferry Road)	Northern end of concurrency with SR 344
Hawkins		32.3	52.0	SR 66 to SR 70 – Rogersville, Bulls Gap	Northern terminus
1.000 mi = 1.609 km; 1.000 km = 0.621 mi: Concurrency terminus
