= Tennessee State Route 92 =

State highway in Tennessee, United States

State Route 92
- SR 92 highlighted in red

Route information
- Maintained by TDOT
- Length: 34.88 mi (56.13 km)

Major junctions
- South end: US 411 in Chestnut Hill
- US 25W / US 70 / SR 66 in Dandridge; I-40 in Dandridge; US 11E in Jefferson City
- North end: US 11W in Rutledge

Location
- Country: United States
- State: Tennessee
- Counties: Jefferson, Grainger

Highway system
- Tennessee State Routes; Interstate; US; State
← SR 91	→ SR 93

State Route 92 (SR 92) is a state highway in East Tennessee with both four-lane and two-lane sections.

== Route description ==
SR 92 begins at US 411/SR 35 in Chestnut Hill. It heads north toward Dandridge and crosses over the French Broad River/Douglas Lake just inside Dandridge city limits, just after crossing the river/lake it junctions with SR 139 in downtown. It the junctions with US 25W, US 70, and SR 66 in downtown Dandridge. SR 92 begins a 0.6-mile (0.97 km) concurrency with US 25W, US 70, and SR 66, the four routes head west then northwest to where US 25W, US 70, and SR 66 head west and SR 92 heads northward and becomes a four-lane divided highway. Next it junctions with I-40 at exit 417. SR 92 then leaves Dandridge city limits 2.1 miles (3.4 km) north of I-40, and the route enters Jefferson City city limits and heads north to US 11E where it begins a 1.3-mile-long (2.1 km) concurrency with US 11E. The two routes head west to where US 11E heads west and SR 92 turns northeast on the edge of Jefferson City. SR 92 then leaves Jefferson City and turns northwest. It then crosses the Holston River just west of Cherokee Dam on the Jefferson–Grainger county line heads north to end at US 11W in downtown Rutledge.

Since 1971, plans were proposed for SR 92 to be extended north of Rutledge to cross the Clinch Mountain ridgeline connecting to the unincorporated town of Washburn, but no action has been taken to move forward with these plans.

== Junction list ==
County	Location	mi	km	Destinations	Notes
Jefferson	Chestnut Hill	0.0	0.0	US 411 (Newport Highway/SR 35) – Sevierville, Newport	Southern terminus
Jefferson	Chestnut Hill			SR 363 east (Indian Creek Road)	Western terminus of SR 363
Jefferson	Dandridge			Dr. James B. Hoskins–J.B. Jarnigan Bridge over the French Broad River/Douglas Lake	
Jefferson	Dandridge			SR 139 west (West Main Street) – Kodak	Eastern terminus of SR 139
Jefferson	Dandridge			US 25W south / US 70 east / SR 66 north (East Meeting Street/SR 9) – Newport	begin US 25W/US 70/SR 66/SR 9 overlap
Jefferson	Dandridge			US 25W north / US 70 west / SR 66 south (SR 9) – Knoxville	end US 25/US 70/SR 66/SR 9 overlap
Jefferson	Dandridge			I-40 – Knoxville, Asheville	I-40 exit 417
Jefferson	Jefferson City			US 11E north (West Broadway Boulevard/SR 34) – Morristown	begin US 11E/SR 34 overlap
Jefferson	Jefferson City			US 11E south (Andrew Johnson Highway/SR 34) – New Market, Strawberry Plains, Knoxville	end US 11E/SR 34 overlap
Jefferson	Jefferson City			West Old Andrew Johnson Highway – Downtown Jefferson City, Carson-Newman University	
Holston River				John K. Shields Bridge	
Grainger	Cherokee			SR 375 north (Lakeshore Drive) – Bean Station	Southern terminus of SR 375
Grainger	Rutledge	34.88	56.13	US 11W (Rutledge Pike/SR 1) – Bean Station, Blaine	Northern terminus
1.000 mi = 1.609 km; 1.000 km = 0.621 mi: Concurrency terminus
