= Catlettsburg =

Catlettsburg may refer to:

- Catlettsburg, Kentucky
- Catlettsburg, Tennessee
