= Tennessee State Route 9 =

Highway in Tennessee

State Route 9

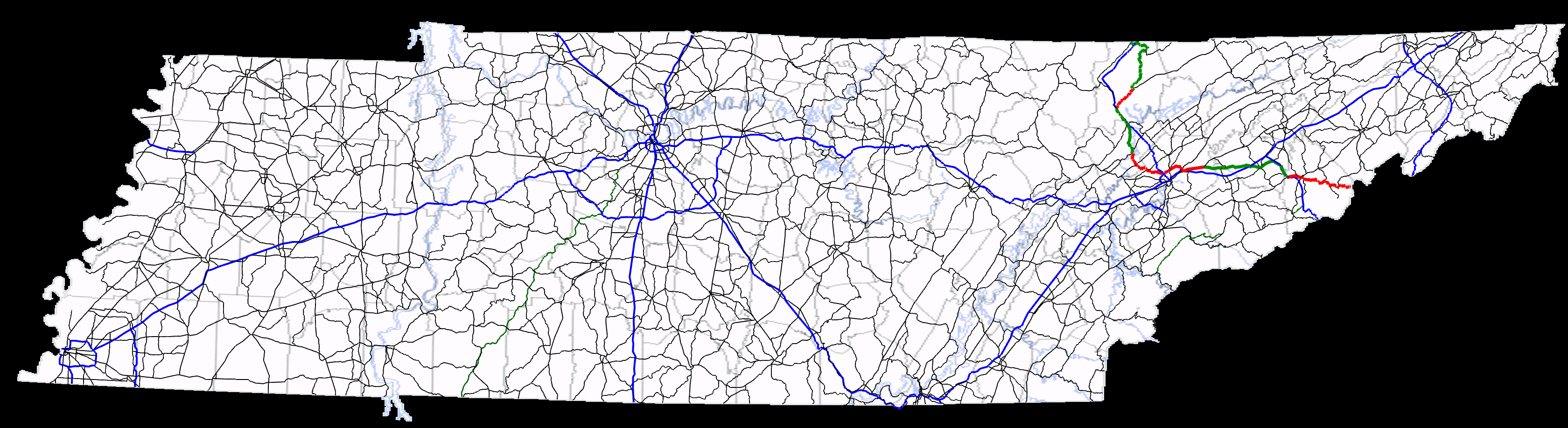
- State Route 9 highlighted. Primary Designation in Red; Secondary Designation in Dark Green.

Route information
- Maintained by TDOT
- Length: 131.33 mi (211.36 km)
- Existed: October 1, 1923–present

Major junctions
- West end: US 25W at the Kentucky state line in Jellico
- I-75 in Jellico; US 441 / SR 33 / SR 331 in Fountain City; I-75 / I-275 / I-640 in Knoxville; I-40 in Knoxville; US 11E / US 70 near Strawberry Plains; I-40 / SR 66 near Dandridge; US 411 in Newport; I-40 in Newport; US 25E in Newport; US 321 / SR 32 in Newport
- East end: US 25 / US 70 at North Carolina state line near Hot Springs

Location
- Country: United States
- State: Tennessee
- Counties: Campbell, Anderson, Knox, Sevier, Jefferson, Cocke

Highway system
- Tennessee State Routes; Interstate; US; State
← SR 8	→ SR 10

State Route 9 (SR 9) is a west-to-east state highway in the U.S. state of Tennessee that is 131.33 miles (211.36 km) long. It begins in Campbell County and ends in Cocke County. SR 9 is little-known by the general public by this designation as it is an unsigned companion designation overlain by U.S. Route 25W and U.S. Route 25 east of Newport; the "9" designation is seen on mileposts. The entire route is located in East Tennessee. Despite running concurrent with a North-South US Route, SR 9 is signed as east-west.

== Route description ==
=== Cocke County ===
SR 9 begins as a primary highway in Cocke County at the North Carolina–Tennessee state line near Del Rio, concurrent with US 25/US 70. US 25/US 70/SR 9 then goes through some curves and cross French Broad River via the Wolf Creek Bridge. They then begin running along the north bank of the French Broad and intersect and become concurrent with SR 107 and then enter Del Rio, where SR 107 separates. US 25/US 70/SR 9 continue northwest to intersect SR 340 before leaving Del Rio. They then cross the French Broad again and before entering Newport and leaving The French Broad and crossing the Pigeon River. In Newport, they intersect SR 73 before entering downtown. In downtown, they intersect and become concurrent with US 321 and SR 35. US 321 separates shortly afterwards at the intersection with SR 32, where US 321 goes south on SR 32 and SR 32 joins the concurrency. US 25/US 70/SR 9/SR 35 then leave downtown and come to where US 25 splits into US 25W and US 25E. Here, SR 32 goes north on US 25E and US 70/SR 9/SR 35 continue on US 25W. The concurrency then has a full interchange with I-40 (Exit 432 A/B) before US 411/SR 35 separate and turn south. When US 411 meets its northern terminus, SR 9 becomes secondary; US 25W/US 70/SR 9 then leave Newport and cross into Jefferson County.

=== Jefferson and Sevier Counties ===
Immediately after crossing the line, they intersect SR 363 in Reidtown. They then cross Douglas Lake, parallel to the I-40 bridge. Immediately after crossing the lake, they intersect SR 113. The highway now enters Dandridge and SR 66 joins the concurrency. US 25W/US 70/SR 9/SR 66 then intersect and become concurrent with SR 92, passing by downtown to the north and SR 66 becoming unsigned at this intersection. They then separate from SR 92 and have another interchange with I-40 (Exit 415), with SR 66 separating and having an unsigned concurrency with I-40 west before leaving Dandridge. US 25W/US 70/SR 9 continue west through rural Jefferson County before coming to an intersection with Snyder Road (which connects to SR 66 and Sevierville) and SR 139, becoming concurrent with SR 139 before crossing into Sevier County. Once across the line, SR 139 separates and turns south towards Kodak, and US 25W/US 70/SR 9 continue west to cross into Knox County.

=== Knox County ===
The highway then has an interchange with US 11E/SR 34 in Carter (also known as Trentville), with US 11E joining the concurrency as they enter Knoxville. SR 9 becomes primary once again at this intersection. US 11E/US 25W/US 70/SR 9 then intersect SR 168 (Governor John Sevier Highway) before crossing a bridge over the Holston River and having another interchange with I-40 (Exit 394), where SR 9 and US 25W run concurrent with the Interstate for a short ways before concurrent with I-640 (Exit 385). They then have interchanges with Mall Road/Washington Pike/Millertown Pike (Exit 8), US 441/SR 33/SR 331 (Broadway, which provides access to Fountain City, Exit 6), and I-75/I-275 (Exit 3A) before separating and US 25W/SR 9 turns north (Exit 3B). US 25W/SR 9 continue through the North Knoxville neighborhood, along Clinton Highway, and then leave Knoxville to enter Powell. In Powell, they intersect and have a short concurrency with SR 131 before leaving Powell and crossing into Anderson County.

=== Anderson County ===
The highway then enters Claxton and becomes a very curvy 4-lane undivided highway. In Claxton, US 25W/SR 9 intersects SR 170, then continues north and leaves Claxton and winds its way through rural areas for a few miles to enter Clinton. In Clinton, they intersect SR 61 before going straight through the historic downtown as Main Street and SR 9 once again becomes secondary. US 25W/SR 9 then leave Clinton and become curvy again before going through Medford to enter Rocky Top (Lake City). In Rocky Top, US 25W/SR 9 go through downtown and intersect and become concurrent with SR 116. The highway intersects US 441/SR 71 (which provides access to Norris Lake and Norris Dam) before coming to an interchange and US 25W/SR 9 becomes concurrent with I-75 (Exit 129), with SR 116 taking over the old route of US 25W/SR 9.

=== Campbell County ===
They then cross into Campbell County and enter Caryville, where they separate from I-75 (Exit 134) and become concurrent with SR 63; SR 9 becomes a primary highway. Immediately afterward, they intersect the northern end of SR 116 and pass by Cove Lake, Cove Lake State Park, and Caryville Dam before leaving Caryville and entering Jacksboro. In Jacksboro, US 25W/SR 9/SR 63 bypass downtown to the north and go through Jacksboro's main business area. The highway now crosses into La Follette, where they go straight through downtown and then US 25W/SR 9 separate from SR 63 and leave La Follette, where SR 9 becomes a secondary route for the rest of its duration and becomes very curvy again as the road enters mountainous terrain. It then passes through Duff and Habersham before passing through Morley and intersecting SR 90. US 25W/SR 9 finally enter Jellico and have another interchange with I-75 (Exit 160). They then enter downtown and intersect SR 297 before turning north and ending at the Kentucky state line, with US 25W continuing north alone into Whitley County, Kentucky.

== Counties traversed ==
State Route 9 traverses the counties shown in the table below.

Counties traversed by State Route 9
County	miles	kilometers
Campbell	32.4	52.1
Anderson	17.9	28.9
Knox	17.0	27.4
Sevier	2.9	4.7
Jefferson	22.2	35.8
Cocke	24.9	40.0

== Major intersections ==
County	Location	mi	km	Destinations	Notes
Cocke		0.0	0.0	US 25 south (NW Hwy 25-70) / US 70 east – Hot Springs	North Carolina state line; eastern terminus of SR 9; eastern end of US 25/US 70 concurrency; SR 9 begins as an unsigned primary highway
Cocke				Wolf Creek Bridge over the French Broad River	
Cocke				SR 107 east – Greeneville	Eastern end of SR 107 concurrency
Cocke	Del Rio			SR 107 west	Western end of SR 107 concurrency
Cocke				SR 340 north (Baltimore Road) – Parrottsville	Southern terminus of SR 340
Cocke				Major J.T. Huff Bridge over the French Broad River	
Cocke	Newport			SR 73 south (Wilton Springs Road) – Cosby	Northern terminus of SR 73
Cocke	Newport			John W. Fisher Bridge over the Pigeon River	
Cocke	Newport			US 321 north (North Street/SR 35 north) – Parrottsville, Greeneville	Eastern end of US 321/SR 35 concurrency
Cocke	Newport			US 321 south (Cosby Highway) to SR 32 south / I-40 – Cosby, Gatlinburg	Western end of US 321 concurrency; eastern end of SR 32 concurrency
Cocke	Newport			US 25E north (Dixie Highway/SR 32 north) / US 25W begins – White Pine, Morristown	US 25 splits into US 25E and US 25W; eastern end of US 25W concurrency; western end of SR 32 concurrency
Cocke	Newport			I-40 – Knoxville, Asheville	I-40 exit 432 A/B
Cocke	Newport			US 411 south (SR 35 south) – Sevierville	Northern terminus of US 411; western end of SR 35 concurrency; SR 9 becomes secondary
Jefferson				SR 363 west (Indian Creek Road)	Eastern terminus of SR 363
Jefferson				Bridge over Douglas Lake/French Broad River	
Jefferson				SR 113 north to I-40 – White Pine	Southern terminus of SR 113
Jefferson	Dandridge			SR 66 north (Valley Home Road) – White Pine, Morristown	Eastern end of SR 66 concurrency
Jefferson	Dandridge			SR 92 south (Gay Street) to SR 139 – Chestnut Hill	Eastern end of SR 92 concurrency
Jefferson	Dandridge			SR 92 north to I-40 – Jefferson City	Western end of SR 92 concurrency
Jefferson				I-40 / SR 66 north – Knoxville, Asheville	I-40 exit 415; western end of SR 66 concurrency; SR 66 continues unsigned, concurrent with I-40 west
Jefferson				SR 139 west (Old Dandridge Pike) – Strawberry Plains Snyder Road to SR 66 - Kodak, Sevierville	Eastern end of SR 139 concurrency
Sevier				SR 139 east (Douglas Dam Road) – Kodak	Western end of SR 139 concurrency
Knox	Carter			US 11E north (Andrew Johnson Highway/SR 34 east) – Strawberry Plains, New Market, Jefferson City	Interchange; eastern end of US 11E concurrency; western terminus of SR 34; SR 9 becomes Primary
Knox	Knoxville			SR 168 west (Governor John Sevier Highway) – South Knoxville	Eastern end of SR 168 concurrency
Knox	Knoxville			Bridge over the Holston River	
Knox	Knoxville			I-40 east / US 11E south / US 70 west (Asheville Highway/SR 168 east) – Asheville, Downtown	I-40 exit 394; eastern end of I-40 concurrency; western end of US 11E/US 70/SR 168 concurrency
Knox	Knoxville			I-40 west / I-640 begins – Downtown	I-40 exit 385; eastern terminus of I-640; western end of I-40 concurrency; eastern end of I-640 concurrency
Knox	Knoxville			Washington Pike/Mall Road/Millertown Pike	Exit 8
Knox	Knoxville			US 441 / SR 33 (Broadway/SR 71) / SR 331 (Old Broadway)	Exit 6; only US 441 is signed along I-640; provides access to Fountain City
Knox	Knoxville			I-75 north / I-275 south – Lexington, Downtown	Exit 3A; eastern end of I-75 concurrency; northern terminus of I-275
Knox	Knoxville			I-640 west / I-75 south – Nashville, Chattanooga	Exit 3B; western end of I-640/I-75 concurrency
Knox	Powell			SR 131 north (Powell Drive) – Halls Crossroads	Eastern end of SR 131 concurrency
Knox	Powell			SR 131 south (Emory Road) – Karns	Western end of SR 131 concurrency
Anderson	Claxton			SR 170 (Edgemoor Road/Raccoon Valley Road) – Oak Ridge, Heiskell	
Anderson	Clinton			Hon. William Everette Lewallen Memorial Bridge over the Clinch River	
Anderson	Clinton			SR 61 (S Charles G Seviers Boulevard) to I-75 – Oliver Springs, Oak Ridge, Norris	SR 9 turns secondary
Anderson	Rocky Top			SR 116 south (Creek Street) – Briceville	Western end of SR 116 concurrency
Anderson	Rocky Top			US 441 south (Norris Freeway/SR 71) to I-75 – Norris	Northern terminus of US 441/SR 71; provides access to Norris Dam, Norris Lake, and Norris Dam State Park
Anderson	Rocky Top			I-75 south / SR 116 north (N Main Street) – Knoxville, Caryville	I-75 exit 129; eastern end of SR 116 concurrency; western end of I-75 concurrency
Campbell	Caryville			I-75 north / SR 63 west – Lexington, Huntsville	I-75 exit 134; western end of I-75 concurrency; eastern end of SR 63 concurrency; SR 9 becomes Primary
Campbell	Caryville			SR 116 south (John McGhee Boulevard) – Vasper, Rocky Top	Northern terminus of SR 116
Campbell	Caryville			Cove Lake Lane - Cove Lake State Park	Access road into park
Campbell	La Follette			SR 63 east (E Central Avenue) – Harrogate, Cumberland Gap, Middlesboro, KY	Western end of SR 63 concurrency; provides access to Cumberland Gap National Historical Park; SR 9 becomes Secondary
Campbell	Morley			SR 90 east – White Oak, Eagan, Clairfield, Pruden, Middlesboro	Western terminus of SR 90
Campbell	Jellico			I-75 – Knoxville, Lexington	I-75 exit 160
Campbell	Jellico			SR 297 west (S Main Street) – Newcomb, Elk Valley, Pioneer, Huntsville	Eastern terminus of SR 297; provides access to Indian Mountain State Park
Campbell	Jellico	131.33	211.36	US 25W north – Williamsburg	Kentucky state line; western terminus of SR 9; US 25W continues north into Kentucky; SR 9 ends as an unsigned secondary highway
1.000 mi = 1.609 km; 1.000 km = 0.621 mi: Concurrency terminus

== See also ==
- List of Tennessee state highways

== Sources ==
- Tennessee Department of Transportation (24 January 2003). "State Highway and Interstate List 2003".
