= Tennessee State Route 344 =

Highway in Tennessee

State Route 344
- TN 344 highlighted in red

Route information
- Maintained by TDOT
- Length: 13.5 mi (21.7 km)
- Existed: July 1, 1983–present

Major junctions
- South end: US 11E / SR 66 in Russellville
- SR 113 near Whitesburg
- North end: US 11W west of Rogersville

Location
- Country: United States
- State: Tennessee
- Counties: Hamblen, Hawkins

Highway system
- Tennessee State Routes; Interstate; US; State
| ← SR 343 | → SR 345 |

State Route 344 (SR 344) is a state highway in Hamblen and Hawkins counties, within the U.S. state of Tennessee. It connects US 11E in Russellville to US 11W west of Rogersville, Tennessee via SR 113.

== Route description ==
SR 344 begins in Hamblen County in Russellville at a Y-Intersection with US 11E/SR 34/SR 66. The highway goes east along the original US 11E alignment through downtown (Old Russellville Pike) before leaving Russellville and turning northeastward through farmland before having an intersection and becoming concurrent with SR 113, where it crosses into Hawkins County. SR 113/SR 344 continue northeast to Saint Clair, where SR 344 splits off and goes north. It then passes through a couple of ridges before making a sharp right and crossing a bridge over Cherokee Lake/Holston River a short distance later. SR 344 then comes to an end at an intersection with US 11W/SR 1 just west of Rogersville.

== Major intersections ==
| County | Location | mi | km | Destinations | Notes |
|---|---|---|---|---|---|
| Hamblen | Russellville | 0.00 | 0.00 | US 11E / SR 66 (East Andrew Johnson Highway/SR 34) – Morristown, Bulls Gap | Southern terminus |
| Hawkins | | | | SR 113 south (Simpson Road) – Whitesburg | Southern end of SR 113 concurrency |
| Hawkins | Saint Clair | | | Saint Clair-Bulls Gap Road – Bulls Gap | |
| Hawkins | Saint Clair | | | SR 113 north – Rogersville | Northern end of SR 113 concurrency |
| Hawkins | | | | US 11W (Lee Highway/SR 1) – Rogersville, Mooresburg, Bean Station | Northern terminus |
1.000 mi = 1.609 km; 1.000 km = 0.621 mi: Concurrency terminus
