= Tennessee State Route 139 =

State highway in Tennessee, United States

State Route 139
- SR 139 highlighted in red

Route information
- Maintained by TDOT
- Length: 24.83 mi (39.96 km)

Major junctions
- West end: US 11E in Strawberry Plains
- US 25W / US 70 near Kodak; SR 66 in Kodak
- East end: SR 92 in Dandridge

Location
- Country: United States
- State: Tennessee
- Counties: Jefferson, Sevier

Highway system
- Tennessee State Routes; Interstate; US; State
← SR 138	→ I-140

State Route 139 (SR 139) is a 25-mile-long (40 km) state highway in Jefferson and Sevier counties in the eastern portion of the U.S. state of Tennessee. It connects Strawberry Plains to Dandridge.

== Route description ==
SR 139' begins in Jefferson County in Strawberry Plains at an intersection with US 11E/SR 34. The road heads southeast through farmland to an intersection and runs concurrently with US 25W/US 70/SR 9 at an intersection with Snyder Road, which serves as a connector to SR 66 and I-40. The highway travels west for a short distance before crossing into Sevier County. SR 139 then splits off and goes southeast again to pass under I-40 before entering Kodak. It passes through the downtown area before leaving Kodak and passing through Beech Springs before returning to Kodak and coming to an intersection with SR 66 and the Great Smoky Mountains Parkway. SR 139 then leaves Kodak for the final time and passes through farmland before having an intersection with SR 338 and crossing back into Jefferson County. SR 139 then runs alongside Douglas Lake and passes by its many marinas and lake homes before entering Dandridge and coming to and end at an intersection with SR 92 in downtown.

== History ==
SR 139 was established around 1950, running between US 25W/70 northwest of Kodak and SR 66 near Douglas Dam. After I-40 was completed in 1975, SR 66 was relocated onto a new route between Sevierville and I-40, and onto a concurrency with I-40 to US 25W/70 in Dandridge, and SR 139 was truncated to the new route of SR 66. On July 1, 1983, as part of a statewide takeover of local roads, SR 139 was re-extended onto its original route between the parkway and Douglas Dam, and extended along the old route of SR 66 to Dandridge. At this time, the old stretch of SR 66 between Sevierville and Douglas Dam became SR 338.

== Junction list ==
County	Location	mi	km	Destinations	Notes
Jefferson	Strawberry Plains	0.00	0.00	US 11E (Andrew Johnson Highway/SR 34) – Knoxville, New Market, Jefferson City	Western terminus
Jefferson	Strawberry Plains			US 25W south / US 70 east (Asheville Highway/SR 9 south) – Dandridge	Western end of US 25W/US 70/SR 9 concurrency
Sevier	Strawberry Plains			US 25W north / US 70 west (Asheville Highway/SR 9 north) – Knoxville	Eastern end of US 25W/US 70/SR 9 concurrency
Sevier	Sevierville–Kodak line			SR 66 (Winfield Dunn Parkway/Great Smoky Mountains Parkway) – Sevierville, Pigeon Forge, Gatlinburg	
Sevier				SR 338 south (Douglas Dam Road) – Douglas Dam	Northern terminus of SR 338
Jefferson				Deep Springs Road to I-40 / US 25W / US 70	
Jefferson	Dandridge	24.83	39.96	SR 92 (Gay Street / Chestnut Hill Road) to US 25W / US 70 – Jefferson City, Chestnut Hill	Eastern terminus
1.000 mi = 1.609 km; 1.000 km = 0.621 mi: Concurrency terminus
