= Catlettsburg, Tennessee =

Catlettsburg
- Unincorporated community
- Location within the state of Tennessee Catlettsburg (the United States)
- Coordinates: 35°54′16″N 83°34′52″W
- Country: United States
- State: Tennessee
- County: Sevier
- Elevation: 886 ft (270 m)
- Time zone: UTC-5 (Eastern (EST))
  - Summer (DST): UTC-4 (EDT)
- GNIS feature ID: 1305733

Catlettsburg is an unincorporated community in Sevier County, Tennessee, United States. It is accessible via Tennessee State Route 66 and Tennessee State Route 338, north of downtown Sevierville and some of the community has been annexed by the city.

== Geography ==
Catlettsburg has a mean elevation of 886 feet (270 metres).

== Schools ==
Catlettsburg Elementary serves the area, a part of the Sevier County, Tennessee, school system.
