= Tennessee State Route 375 =

State highway in Grainger County, Tennessee

State Route 375
- Lakeshore Road
- TN 375 highlighted in red

Route information
- Maintained by TDOT
- Length: 18.2 mi (29.3 km)
- Existed: July 1, 1983–present

Major junctions
- South end: SR 92 in Cherokee
- North end: US 25E in Bean Station

Location
- Country: United States
- State: Tennessee
- Counties: Grainger

Highway system
- Tennessee State Routes; Interstate; US; State
← SR 374	→ SR 376

State Route 375 (SR 375), also known as Lakeshore Road, is an 18.2-mile-long (29.3 km) state highway located in Grainger County, in the U.S. state of Tennessee.

It connects US 25E with SR 92, traveling along the north coast of Cherokee Lake.

== Route description ==
Lakeshore Road starts at SR 92 near the community of Cherokee and follows a northeasterly direction, closely bordering Cherokee Lake on its way to Bean Station. The highway meanders through rural unincorporated Grainger County, passing by farms, marinas, and lakefront housing developments. It follows the shoreline of an arm of Cherokee Lake, crosses the German Creek Bridge, and eventually leaves the lake's shore before terminating at the intersection of US 25E-SR 32 in Bean Station.

== Major intersections ==
The entire route is in Grainger County.

Location	mi	km	Destinations	Notes
Cherokee	0.0	0.0	SR 92 – Rutledge, Jefferson City, Cherokee Dam	Southern terminus
Hoppers Bluff			Helton Road	State connector road to US 11W
German Creek	15– 15.2	24– 24.5	German Creek Bridge over Cherokee Lake/German Creek	
German Creek			Rocky Springs Road	State connector road to US 25E-US 11W
Bean Station	18.2	29.3	US 25E (Dixie Highway/SR 32/East Tennessee Crossing Byway) – Tazewell, Morristown	Northern terminus
1.000 mi = 1.609 km; 1.000 km = 0.621 mi
