= Alder Branch, Tennessee =

Alder Branch
- Unincorporated community
- Location within the state of Tennessee Alder Branch (the United States)
- Coordinates: 35°55′18″N 83°33′18″W
- Country: United States
- State: Tennessee
- County: Sevier
- Elevation: 948 ft (289 m)
- Time zone: UTC-5 (Eastern (EST))
  - Summer (DST): UTC-4 (EDT)
- GNIS feature ID: 1314572

Alder Branch is an unincorporated community in Sevier County, Tennessee, United States. It is accessible via State Route 338, outside of the city of Sevierville. The area is named for the Alder Branch Baptist Church founded in 1836, which itself is named for the Alder Branch stream which flows through the area.

William Atchley, a locally famous Baptist preacher and member of the church, deeded a portion of his property to the Alder Branch Baptist Church and Cemetery where he now lies in state.

== Geography ==
Alder Branch is located at 35°55′18″N 83°33′19″W and has a mean elevation of 948 feet (289 metres)
