= Tennessee State Route 341 =

State highway in Tennessee, United States

State Route 341
- TN 341 highlighted in red

Route information
- Maintained by TDOT
- Length: 10.4 mi (16.7 km)
- Existed: July 1, 1983–present

Major junctions
- West end: US 11E in Talbott
- I-81 in White Pine
- East end: US 25E in White Pine

Location
- Country: United States
- State: Tennessee
- Counties: Hamblen, Jefferson

Highway system
- Tennessee State Routes; Interstate; US; State
← SR 340	→ SR 342

State Route 341 (SR 341) is a 10.4-mile-long (16.7 km) state highway that travels within portions of Hamblen and Jefferson counties in the eastern portion of the U.S. state of Tennessee. It connects Talbott with White Pine.

== Route description ==
SR 341 begins at an intersection with US 11E in Talbott (within the city limits of Morristown, Tennessee) in Hamblen County. It then enters Jefferson County and heads south as Talbott–Kansas Road to an intersection where Talbott–Kansas Road travels south and SR 341 turns east onto North White Pine Road and continues as White Pine Road until its intersection with SR 66. It enters White Pine just before the SR 66 intersection, where it becomes Roy Messer Highway and then has an interchange with I-81 and continues east to meet its eastern terminus, an intersection with US 25E.

== Junction list ==
County	Location	mi	km	Destinations	Notes
Hamblen	Talbott–Morristown line	0.0	0.0	US 11E (West Andrew Johnson Highway/SR 34) – Morristown, Jefferson City	Western terminus
Jefferson	White Pine			SR 66 (Valley Home Road) – Dandridge, Morristown	
Jefferson	White Pine			I-81 – Knoxville, Bristol	
Jefferson	White Pine			SR 113 (Main Street) – Dandridge	
Jefferson	White Pine			US 25E (State Street/SR 32) – Newport, Morristown	Eastern terminus
1.000 mi = 1.609 km; 1.000 km = 0.621 mi
