= Tennessee State Route 363 =

State Highway in Jefferson County, Tennessee, USA

State Route 363
- Indian Creek Road
- TN 363 highlighted in red

Route information
- Maintained by TDOT
- Length: 6.0 mi (9.7 km)
- Existed: July 1, 1983–present

Major junctions
- West end: SR 92 north of Chestnut Hill
- East end: US 25W / US 70 in Reidtown

Location
- Country: United States
- State: Tennessee
- Counties: Jefferson

Highway system
- Tennessee State Routes; Interstate; US; State
← SR 362	→ SR 364

State Route 363 (SR 363), also known as Indian Creek Road, is a 6.0-mile-long (9.7 km) east-west mile long state highway in Jefferson County, Tennessee. It provides access to lakeside homes and marinas along the south shore of Douglas Lake.

== Route description ==
SR 363 begins at an intersection north of Chestnut Hill at an intersection with SR 92. It goes northeast through farmland before winding its way east through wooded hilly terrain to cross a narrow bridge over Douglas Lake. It winds its way past lakeside homes and marinas before heading southeast through farmland to come to an end at an intersection with US 25W/US 70/SR 9 in Reidtown, just feet from the Cocke County line. The entire route of SR 363 is a narrow two-lane highway traveling along the south shore of Douglas Lake/French Broad River.

== Major intersections ==
The entire route is in Jefferson County.

Location	mi	km	Destinations	Notes
	0.0	0.0	SR 92 (Chestnut Hill Road) – Chestnut Hill, Dandridge	Western terminus
			Bridge over Douglas Lake	
Reidtown	6.0	9.7	US 25W / US 70 (SR 9) – Newport, Dandridge	Eastern terminus
1.000 mi = 1.609 km; 1.000 km = 0.621 mi
