= Beech Springs, Tennessee =

Beech Springs
- Unincorporated community
- Location within the state of Tennessee Beech Springs (the United States)
- Coordinates: 35°57′48″N 83°37′02″W
- Country: United States
- State: Tennessee
- County: Sevier
- Elevation: 988 ft (301 m)
- Time zone: UTC-5 (Eastern (EST))
  - Summer (DST): UTC-4 (EDT)
- GNIS feature ID: 1276858

Beech Springs is an unincorporated community in Sevier County, Tennessee, United States. Accessible by Tennessee Secondary Primary Route 139, it lies just south of Kodak.

== History ==
The community was named for a grove of beech standing at a nearby stream.

== Geography ==
The community is located at a mean elevation of 988 feet (301 metres) above sea level.
