= Tennessee State Route 338 =

State highway in Tennessee, United States

State Route 338
- SR 338 highlighted in red

Route information
- Maintained by TDOT
- Length: 20.2 mi (32.5 km)
- Existed: July 1, 1983–present

Major junctions
- South end: US 411 / US 441 in Seymour
- SR 66 in Sevierville
- North end: SR 139 northeast of Sevierville

Location
- Country: United States
- State: Tennessee
- Counties: Sevier

Highway system
- Tennessee State Routes; Interstate; US; State
← SR 337	→ SR 339

State Route 338 (SR 338) is a secondary highway located entirely within Sevier County in East Tennessee. The road runs generally south–north although like most roads in East Tennessee it has numerous winding turns.

== Route description ==
SR 338 begins at an intersection with US 441/US 411/SR 35/SR 71 in Seymour. It winds its way northeast as Boyds Creek Highway to pass through Boyds Creek before entering Sevierville and coming to an intersection with SR 66 and the Great Smoky Mountains Parkway. SR 338 turns south and runs concurrently with SR 66 to pass through a business district before leaving SR 66 and the parkway and turning northeast onto Douglas Dam Road and leaving Sevierville. It continues northeast through farmland to pass through Alder Branch, where it becomes Old State Highway 66, before turning north and crossing the French Broad River just west of the Douglas Dam. SR 338 then continues north to come to an end at an intersection with SR 139.

== History ==
Around 1948, SR 66 was extended as a new route between US 25W/70 in Dandridge and US 411/441 in downtown Sevierville. SR 139 was established around 1950 between US 25W/70 northwest of Kodak and SR 66 near Douglas Dam. After I-40 was completed in 1975, SR 66 was relocated onto a new route between Sevierville and I-40, and onto a concurrency with I-40 to US 25W/70 in Dandridge; and SR 139 was truncated to the new route of SR 66. On July 1, 1983, as part of a statewide takeover of local roads, SR 338 was established as a new road, replacing the old designation of SR 66 between the Great Smoky Mountains Parkway and Douglas Dam and running concurrently with the parkway portion of SR 66. The portion west of the parkway was established as a state takeover of a locally-maintained road. SR 139 was also re-extended onto its original route between the parkway and Douglas Dam, and extended along the old route of SR 66 to Dandridge.

== Major intersections ==
The entire route is in Sevier County.

Location	mi	km	Destinations	Notes
Seymour	0.0	0.0	US 411 north / US 441 (Chapman Highway/SR 35 north/SR 71) – Sevierville, Knoxville US 411 south (Maryville Highway/SR 35 south) – Maryville	Southern terminus
Sevierville			SR 66 north (Winfield Dunn Parkway) to I-40 – Kodak	Southern end of wrong-way SR 66 concurrency
Sevierville			SR 66 south (Winfield Dunn Parkway) – Downtown, Pigeon Forge, Gatlinburg	Northern end of wrong-way SR 66 concurrency
			Bridge over the French Broad River	
	20.2	32.5	SR 139 (Douglas Dam Road) – Kodak, Dandridge	Northern terminus
1.000 mi = 1.609 km; 1.000 km = 0.621 mi: Concurrency terminus
