= Tennessee State Route 345 =

Highway in Tennessee

State Route 345
- Cedar Fork Road
- TN 345 highlighted in red

Route information
- Maintained by TDOT
- Length: 8.5 mi (13.7 km)
- Existed: July 1, 1983–present

Major junctions
- South end: US 25E in Tazewell
- North end: SR 63 just south of Hopewell

Location
- Country: United States
- State: Tennessee
- Counties: Claiborne

Highway system
- Tennessee State Routes; Interstate; US; State
← SR 344	→ SR 346

State Route 345 (SR 345), also known as Cedar Fork Road, is an 8.5-mile-long (13.7 km) north–south state highway in Claiborne County, Tennessee. It serves as a connector between Tazewell to SR 63 and the Hopewell community.

== Route description ==
SR 345 begins in Tazewell at an intersection with US 25E/SR 32 just north of downtown. It goes northeast to pass through neighborhoods before passing by businesses and industrial areas. The highway then leaves Tazewell and continues northeast for several miles through a mix of farmland and wooded areas, running parallel to the Powell River. SR 345 then comes to an end at an intersection with SR 63, just across the river from Hopewell. The entire route SR 345 is a two-lane highway.

== Major intersections ==
The entire route is in Claiborne County.

Location	mi	km	Destinations	Notes
Tazewell	0.0	0.0	US 25E (Dixie Highway/SR 32) – Bean Station, Harrogate	Southern terminus
	8.5	13.7	SR 63 (Hopewell Road/Alanthus Hill Road) – Harrogate, Sneedville	Northern terminus
1.000 mi = 1.609 km; 1.000 km = 0.621 mi
