= Douglas Dam =

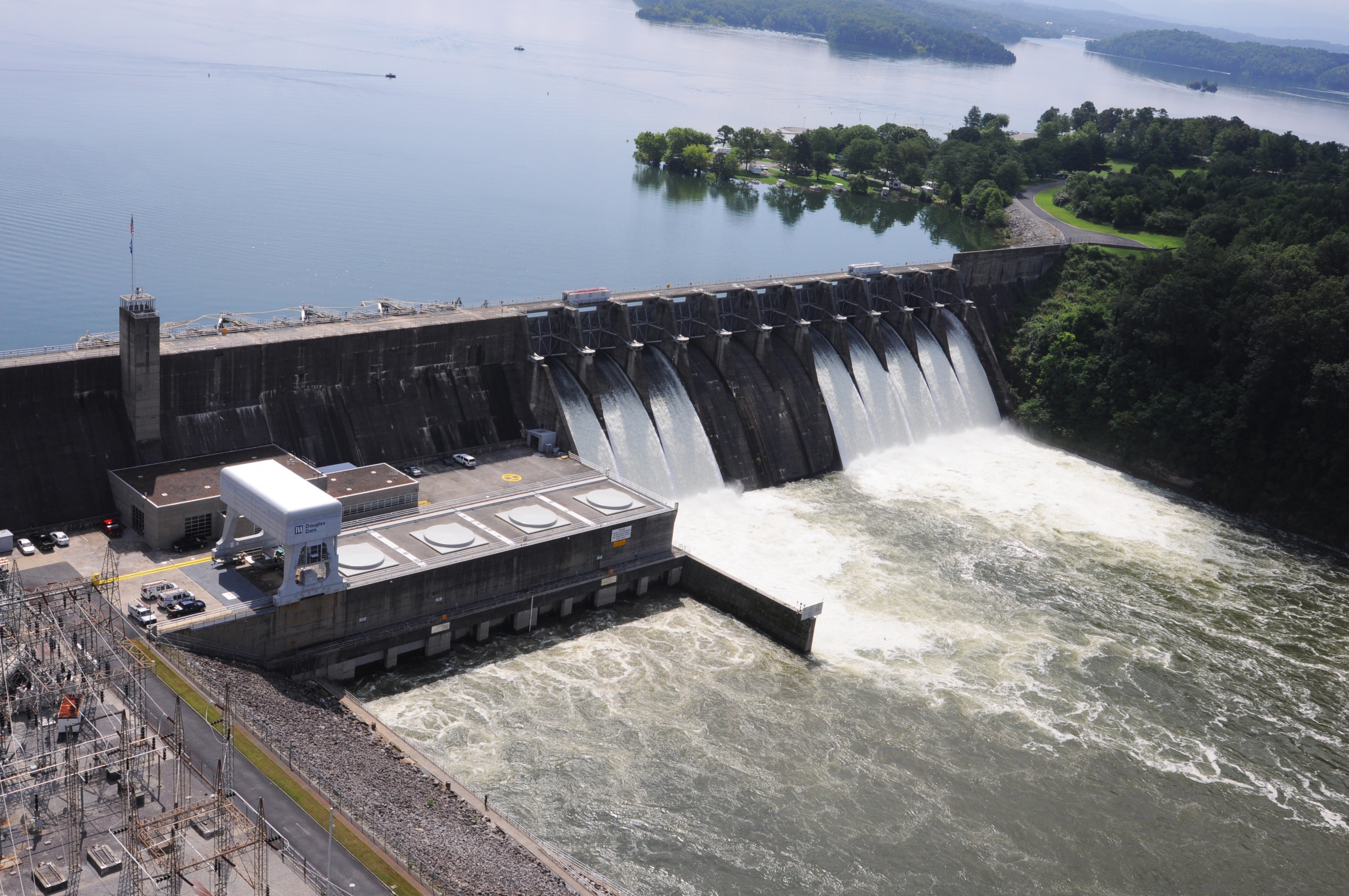
- Douglas Dam from downstream

- Location within Tennessee
- Official name: Douglas Dam
- Location: Sevier County, Tennessee, U.S.
- Coordinates: 35°57′40″N 83°32′20″W
- Purpose: Flood control, electricity
- Construction began: February 2, 1942
- Opening date: February 19, 1943
- Operator: Tennessee Valley Authority

Dam and spillways
- Impounds: French Broad River
- Height: 202 feet (62 m)
- Length: 1,705 feet (520 m)

Reservoir
- Creates: Douglas Lake
- Total capacity: 1,461,000 acre⋅ft (1,802,000 dam^{3})
- Catchment area: 4,541 mi^{2} (11,760 km^{2})

Power Station
- Commission date: 1942–1954
- Turbines: 2 × 41 MW, 2 × 32 MW Francis-type
- Installed capacity: 146 MW

Douglas Dam is a hydroelectric dam on the French Broad River in Sevier County, Tennessee, in the southeastern United States. The dam is operated by the Tennessee Valley Authority (TVA), which built the dam in record time in the early 1940s to meet emergency energy demands at the height of World War II. Douglas Dam is a straight reinforced concrete gravity-type dam 1705 feet (520 m) long and 202 feet (62 m) high, impounding the 28,420-acre (11,500 ha) Douglas Lake. The dam was named for Douglas Bluff, a cliff overlooking the dam site prior to construction.

== Location and access ==
The French Broad River winds its way westward from the Appalachian Mountains, gaining considerable strength after absorbing the Pigeon River and Nolichucky River near Newport before eventually joining with the Holston River at Knoxville to form the Tennessee River. Douglas Dam is located 32 miles (51 km) above the mouth of the French Broad. The area is a geological border between the Foothills of the Great Smoky Mountains (which rise to the south) and the Appalachian Ridge-and-Valley range. The reservoir includes parts of Sevier, Jefferson, Hamblen, and Cocke counties.

Road access is available by Tennessee State Route 338 which crosses the river just downstream of the dam. Interstate 40 (Exit 407) passes a few miles to the north. The dam is also accessed from I-40 exit 412 via Deep Springs Road and Tennessee State Route 139.

The dam does not have any navigational locks.

== Background and construction ==
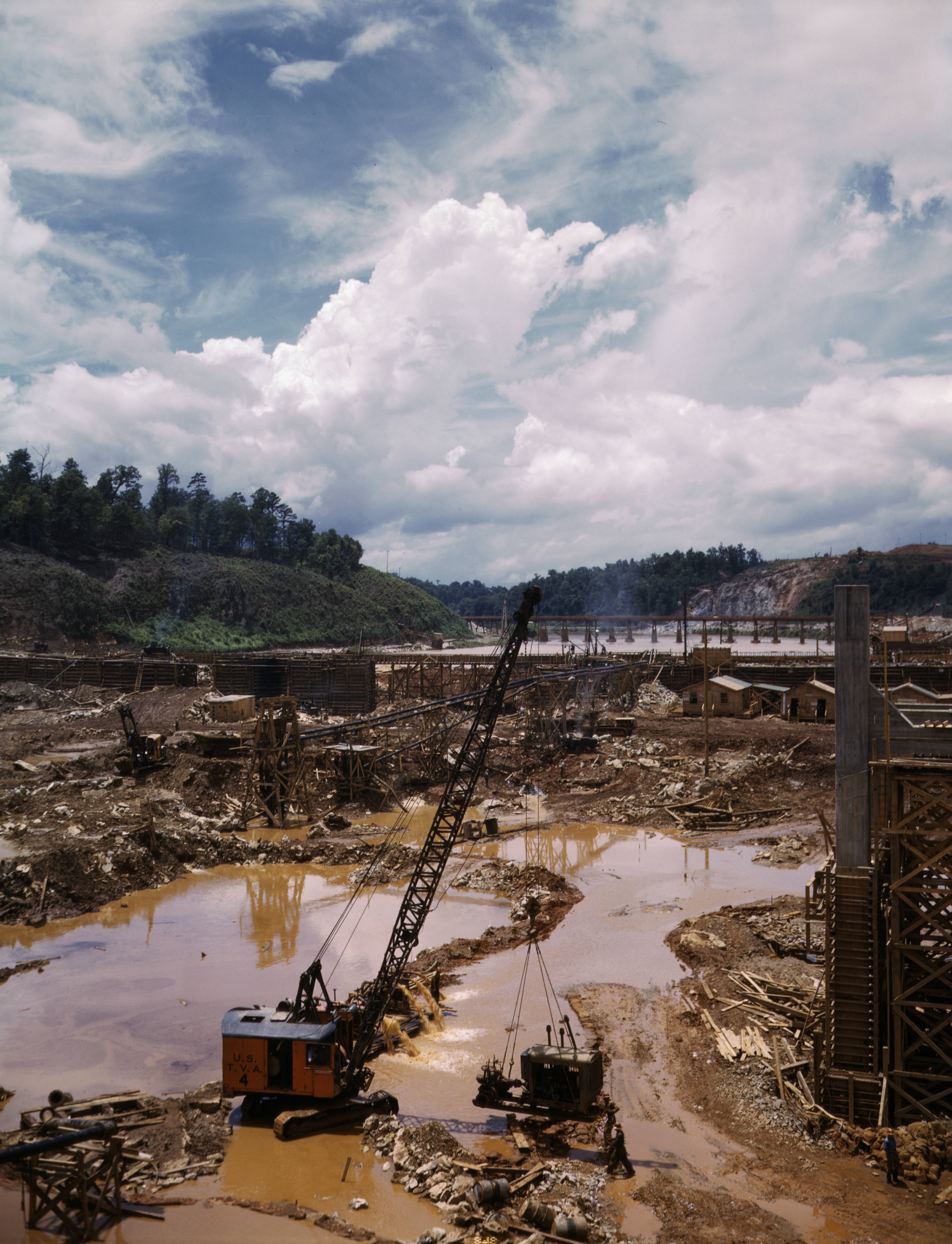
Douglas Dam during construction.

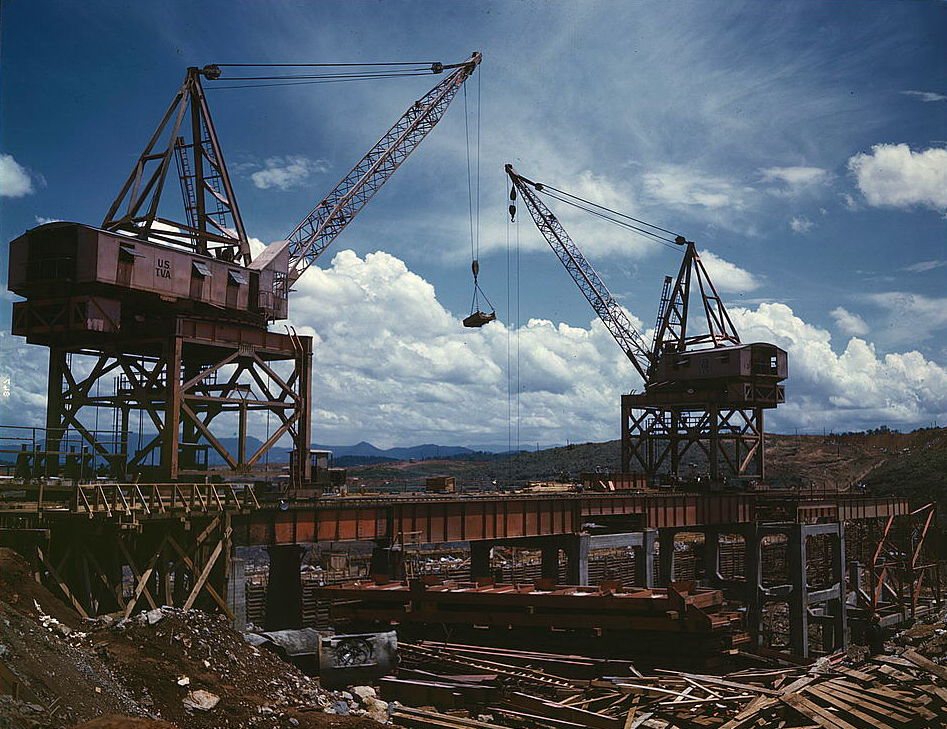
Construction work at Douglas Dam, 1942.

During 1941, President Franklin D. Roosevelt requested Congress to allocate funding for a dam on the French Broad River in East Tennessee. After the Japanese attack on Pearl Harbor resulted in the United States entering World War II, construction of this dam became a high priority in order to generate hydroelectric power for national defense purposes. Large amounts of electricity were needed to produce aluminum and magnesium – vital metals for wartime warplane-manufacturing.

When the TVA first asked Congress for the funds to construct Douglas Dam in late 1941, U.S. Senator Kenneth McKellar (D-Tennessee) opposed the project because it would flood some 40 square miles (100 km^{2}) of fertile farmland important to the local food canning industry. McKellar succeeded in blocking this project for two months, but his opposition was overridden because of national defense needs. The Office of Production Management predicted that wartime industrial production would peak in 1943, and that the generating capacity of existing and planned TVA projects would be short by 230,000 kilowatts of electric power.

Congress approved the project in January 1942 and President Roosevelt signed the bill into law on January 30, 1942. Construction began immediately on February 2 as a rush project, and it used blueprints, civil engineers, construction workers, and construction machinery from the nearby Cherokee Dam, which had been completed a few weeks earlier in late 1941.

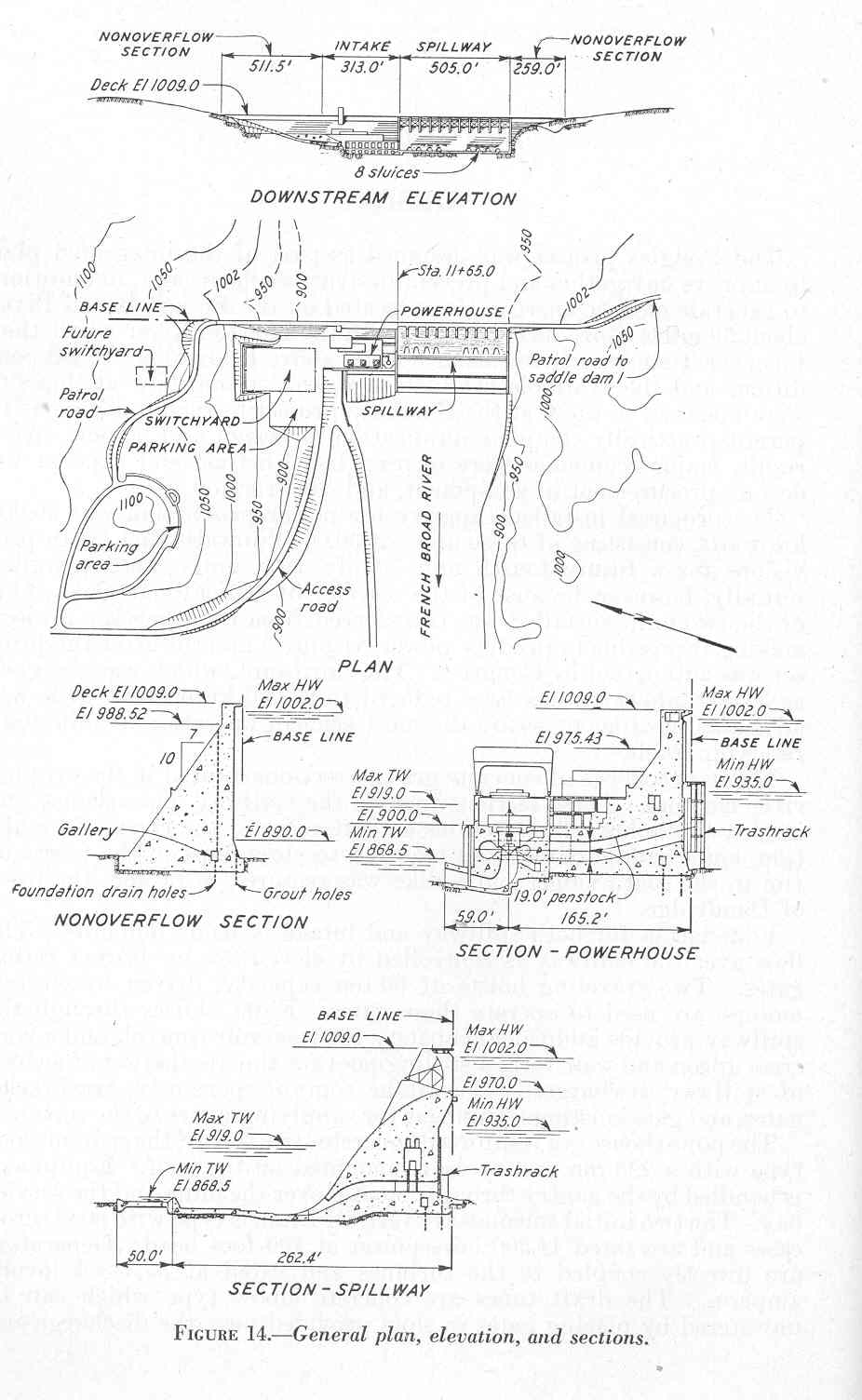
Plan of Douglas Dam, circa 1941–2

The construction of the Douglas Dam and its accompanying reservoir required the purchase of 33,160 acres (13,420 ha) of land, 5,182 acres (2,097 ha) of which were forested and had to be cleared. This project also required the relocation of 525 families and 32 cemeteries, and the rerouting of several miles of roads. Supplies for the construction of the dam were hauled to the site by the Smoky Mountain Railroad, which had constructed a spur line to the site from nearby Sevierville. Profits from supporting the dam construction saved this railroad from bankruptcy.

The Douglas Project required the construction of ten smaller, earthen saddle dams to fill in gaps along the adjacent ridgeline and permit a higher water elevation than would otherwise be possible. Most of these saddle dams are located in the hills southeast of the main dam. One protects downtown Dandridge, Tennessee, which along with the communities of Shady Grove, Oak Grove, and Rankin, was originally scheduled to be flooded by the reservoir behind the dam. However, the citizens of Dandridge appealed to the First Lady, Eleanor Roosevelt, noting that this town was the only place in the United States named for Martha Washington, the wife of the first president George Washington. Mrs. Roosevelt ensured that a saddle dam was built to protect Dandridge from flooding. The saddle dam was built of earthen fill, and reinforced on its lakeside by gravel and riprap.

In spite of a four-week work delay caused by flooding, the Douglas Dam was completed and its floodgates were closed on February 19, 1943, 382 days after the construction began; this set a world record for a project of its size. Its first electric generator went on-line on March 21, 1943, and its second one went on-line on January 1, 1944. Its powerhouse operated at maximum capacity for most of its first year of operation. After its completion, the Douglas Dam powerhouse furnished electric power for two critical war industries, aluminum production and the Manhattan Project's uranium enrichment operations at nearby Oak Ridge, Tennessee.

== Power generation, flood control, and other purposes ==
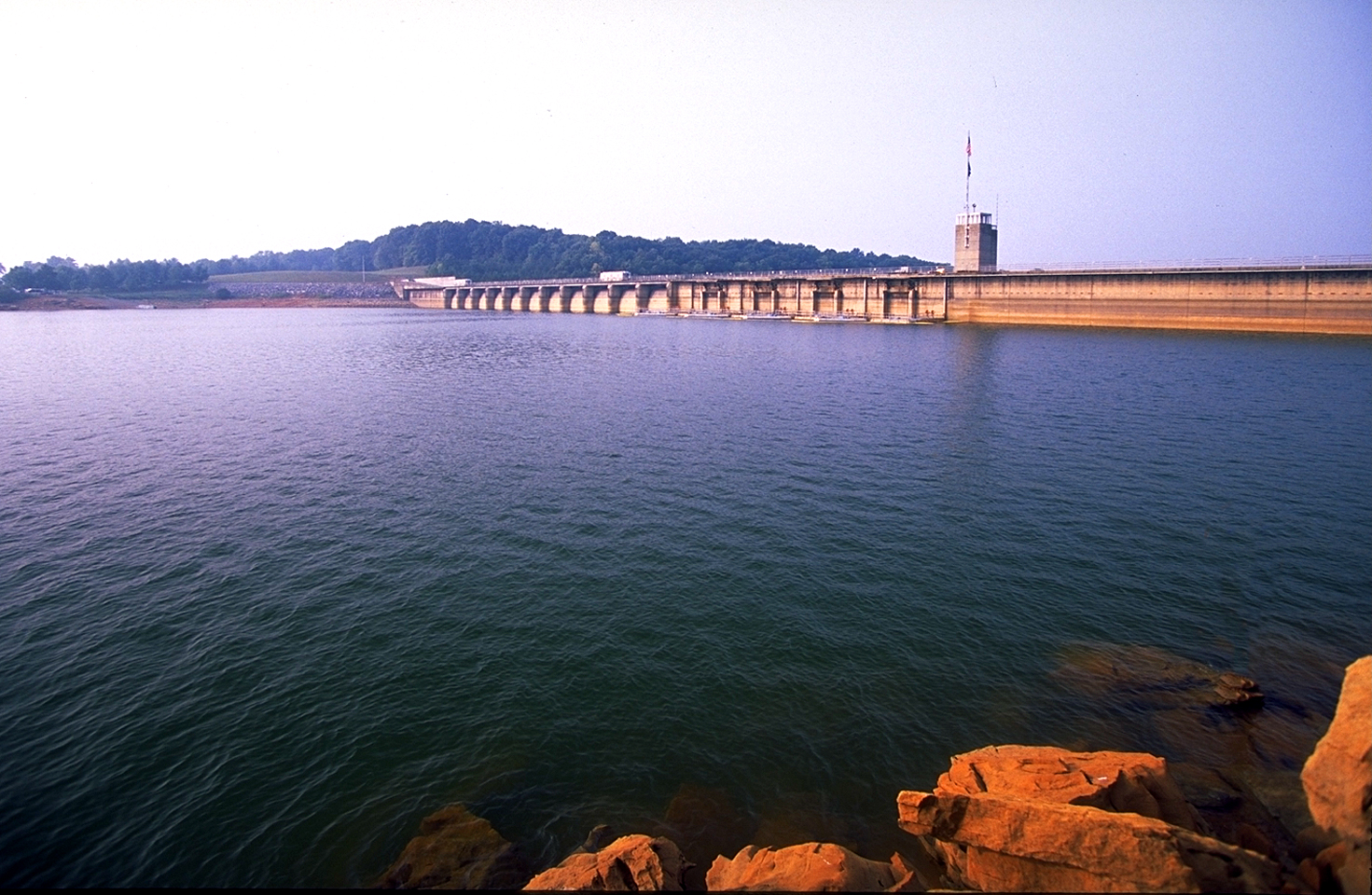
Douglas Dam from upstream

The Douglas Dam powerhouse is a hydroelectric power producer with four large water turbines that drive four large electric generators. Their combined peak electric power-production capacity is 146,000 kilowatts.

In addition to hydroelectric generation, there are several secondary purposes of the Douglas dam and reservoir. One of these is flood control for the French Broad River and also for the Tennessee River downstream. Douglas Lake has a total capacity of roughly 1,461,000 acre⋅ft (1,802,000 dam^{3}) of water, of which 1,081,880 acre-feet (1,334,480 dam^{3}) is reserved for flood control.

The water stored in Douglas Lake serves an important purpose during extended dry periods and droughts in East Tennessee and western North Carolina. Then, water is released from this and other dams on the upper tributaries of the Tennessee River in order to maintain an eight-foot-deep navigation channel for barges on the inland waterway of the river from Knoxville down to its mouth at the Ohio River. If it were not for these releases of water, parts of the Tennessee River would become unnavigable. Furthermore, the water that is released is then available for all the drinking-water supplies of cities and towns downstream, and in addition, it is available for watering farms during the droughts. Intentional drawdown during winter months is a common time for these releases, exposing the lake bottom up to several hundred feet from the shoreline and resulting in suspension of power generation when the lake reaches dead pool levels. This also helps to mitigate potential flood and overtopping conditions that could result from spring rains and meltwater from surrounding mountain streams.

Another secondary purpose of the Douglas Dam and Douglas Lake is for recreational boating, swimming, and fishing. Significant amounts of freshwater fish are caught in Douglas Lake by humans. Douglas Lake has an average of 500 miles (800 km) of shoreline, and it has an average surface area of nearly 30,000 acres (120 square kilometers), with both measurements varying according to the seasonally changing water level of Douglas Lake.

Douglas Lake is a recreational destination for up to two million visitors per year. Primary uses of the lake and its shores are fishing, boating, water skiing, swimming, camping, hiking, and wildlife observing. In addition to a number of private campgrounds in this area, TVA provides the Douglas Dam Headwater Campground and the Douglas Dam Tailwater Campground for public use. The Tennessee Wildlife Resources Agency stocks Douglas Lake with tens of thousands of sauger and crappie fish each year to thrive and then provide recreational and food fishing.

== Ecological effects ==
One of the problems of hydroelectric dams is the periodic reduction of dissolved oxygen in the tailwaters downstream of the dam. Three systems are used at Douglas Dam to improve oxygenation.

1. Turbine venting – injection of oxygen at the water turbines.
2. Surface water pumps – pumps that push surface water downward to the turbines.
3. Water pulsing – periodic release of water through the power turbines to maintain some water flow downstream at all times.
