= Persia, Tennessee =

Unincorporated community in Tennessee, US

Coordinates: 36°20′23″N 83°00′11″W

Persia is an unincorporated community in Hawkins County, Tennessee, south of Rogersville.

Persia is located on Tennessee State Routes 66 and 70.

== History ==
A post office was established as Persia in 1868, and remained in operation until it was discontinued in 1967. Persia was a station on the East Tennessee, Virginia and Georgia Railway, which was founded in 1869.

== Postal service ==
Persia once had a post office; the closest post office now is in Rogersville. Persia shares Rogersville's ZIP code, 37857.

== Education ==
Cherokee High School is located in Persia. It is a part of Hawkins County School District.
