= Cherokee, Tennessee =

- Unincorporated community
- Location within Tennessee Location within the United States
- Coordinates: 36°12′26″N 83°29′52″W
- Country: United States
- State: Tennessee
- County: Grainger
- Elevation: 1,230 ft (375 m)
- Time zone: UTC-5 (Eastern (EST))
  - Summer (DST): UTC-4 (EDT)
- ZIP code: 37861
- Area code: 865
- GNIS feature ID: 1314825

Cherokee (also known as Cherokee Village) is an unincorporated community in southern Grainger County, Tennessee.

It is located at the intersection of Tennessee State Routes 92 and 375 near TVA's Cherokee Dam.
