= Strawberry Plains, Tennessee =

Strawberry Plains
- CDP
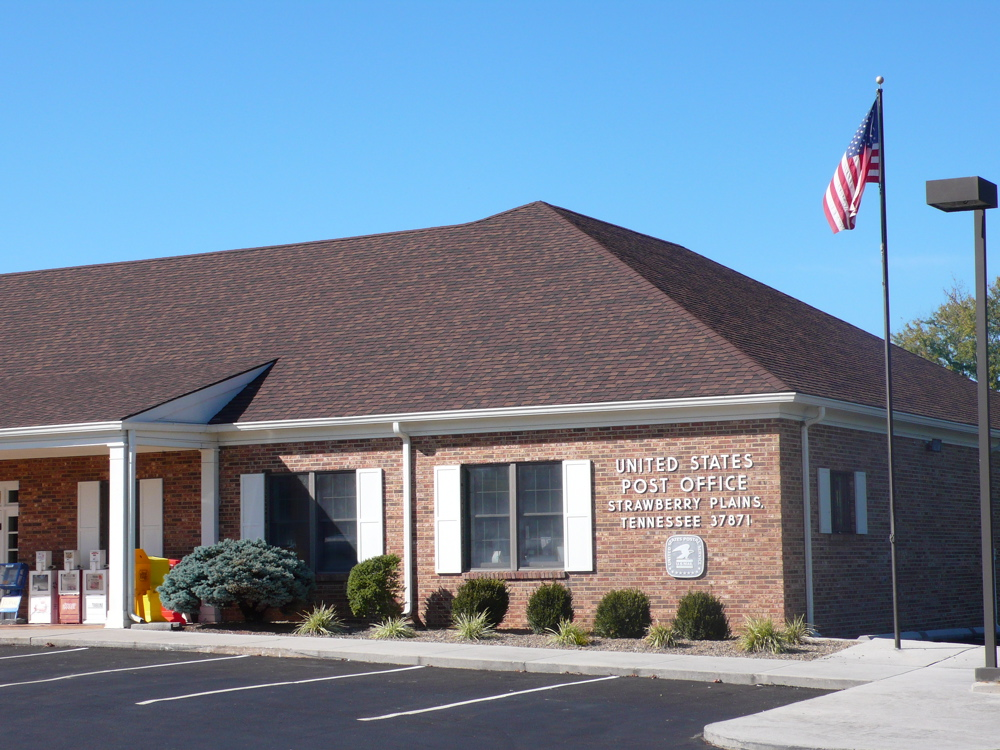
- Post office in Strawberry Plains
- Nickname: Straw Plains
- Location within Tennessee Location within the United States
- Coordinates: 36°3′47″N 83°41′10″W
- Country: United States
- State: Tennessee
- Counties: Jefferson, Knox, Sevier
- Settled: 1785

Area
  - Total: 4.24 sq mi (10.98 km^{2})
  - Land: 4.19 sq mi (10.85 km^{2})
  - Water: 0.054 sq mi (0.14 km^{2})
- Elevation: 928 ft (283 m)

Population (2020)
  - Total: 2,405
  - Density: 574.3/sq mi (221.75/km^{2})
- Time zone: UTC-5 (Eastern (EST))
  - Summer (DST): UTC-4 (EDT)
- ZIP codes: 37871, 37914, 37924
- Area code: 865
- FIPS code: 47093
- GNIS feature ID: 1303876, 2804643

Strawberry Plains is an unincorporated community and census-designated place (CDP) in Jefferson, Knox, and Sevier counties in the State of Tennessee, United States. Before 2010, it was treated by the United States Census Bureau as a census county division. It is included in both the Knoxville Metropolitan Statistical Area and the Morristown Metropolitan Statistical Area.

The population of the CDP, which only covers the Jefferson County portion of the community, was 2,405 at the 2020 census.

== History ==
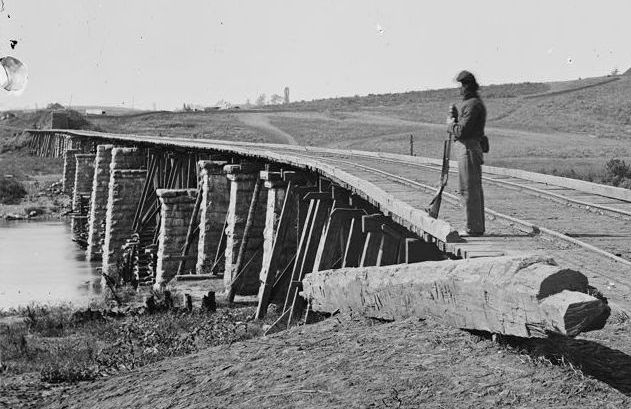
A Union sentry guards the railroad bridge over the Holston River at Strawberry Plains in 1863

The community that would become Strawberry Plains would be settled in 1785 by Adam Meek, a pioneer from North Carolina who would first settle in nearby Rocky Valley, and the first established settlement of newly founded Jefferson County. Meek would resettle near the banks of the Holston River in present-day Strawberry Plains following conflicts with inhabiting Native Americans.

Strawberry Plains is said to be named for the wild strawberries that grew there in abundance when white settlers from North Carolina first arrived in the area. William Williams, a North Carolina man, would acquire 1,200 acres in the community in 1808, and begin an agricultural industry on the wild strawberries grown in the land Williams had maintained. According to a history of the community written by local high school students circa 1935, the name Straw Plains was a shorthand name used by railroad porters and flagmen on trains that passed through Strawberry Plains, and that came to be used as the name of the local railroad depot and on some local post office postmarks.

Early in the Civil War, in 1861, the railroad bridge at Strawberry Plains was one target of Union sympathizers who aimed to burn several East Tennessee bridges to hinder Confederate military progress. The conspirators failed in their efforts to burn the Strawberry Plains bridge, but succeeded in their attacks of some of their other targets. In 1864, the bridge was destroyed in an artillery duel between Confederate and Union forces.

By the 1920s and 1930s, Strawberry Plains emerged as an unincorporated town, with an established downtown area consisting several general stores, a gristmill, auto repair shops, several restaurants, gas stations, a bank, a train depot, and a post office. Immediate access to Knoxville, Dandridge, and Mascot courtesy of U.S. Route 11E (Andrew Johnson Highway), and the Southern Railroad influenced the growth of the community. By 1930, Strawberry Plains had an estimated population of nearly 500 residents.

By the 1970s and into the 1990s, suburban sprawl entered the community, following the widening of US 11E to four lanes in the 1950s and the increasing job market in the neighboring cities of Morristown, Sevierville, Jefferson City, and Knoxville.

With the completion of Interstate 40 in the southwestern part of the community in 1975, the community faced confrontations with the Knoxville City Council in the 1990s, with their controversial "finger" annexation of the commercial and retail corridors of exits 398 and 402 on I-40 on behalf of Knoxville mayor Victor Ashe's efforts to increase sales tax revenue in Knoxville.

Through much of the 20th century, Strawberry Plains was the site of a Tennessee limestone quarry and an underground zinc mine. The zinc mine shut down in 2001, but reopened in 2006. In December 2008 it was announced that the mine would close again in February 2009.

== Geography ==
Strawberry Plains is located on the bank of the Holston River on the tri-county border of Jefferson, Knox, and Sevier counties. According to the United States Geological Survey, a variant name is Straw Plains. Strawberry Plains has been the site of a post office since 1806. The zip code is 37871, though parts of Strawberry Plains are located in the Knoxville zip codes 37914 and 37924.

== Demographics ==
Historical population
Census	Pop.	Note	%±
2020	2,405		—
U.S. Decennial Census

== Economy ==
In September 2007, the Tennessee Bureau of Investigation announced plans to build an office facility and crime lab in Strawberry Plains at Interstate 40 exit 398, having an estimated cost of more than $10 million. The 33,000-square-foot facility was completed in July 2009.

Exit 398 on I-40 at Strawberry Plains Pike has seen an increased amount of development since the 1990s. There are several hotels, restaurants and gas stations, with more under construction. With the increased growth around the interchange, the location has since been annexed into the City of Knoxville.

The Tennessee Department of Transportation administrative office for Region 1 is also located on Strawberry Plains Pike.

Plans for a mixed-use town centre in the Carter area of Strawberry Plains have been proposed by the Knoxville-Knox County Metropolitan Planning Commission to provide a community hub space for eastern Knox County as the area's population grows.

== Education ==
=== Public schools ===
- Jefferson County Schools:
  - Rush Strong School
- Knox County Schools:
  - Carter Elementary School
  - Carter Middle School
  - Carter High School
- Career Magnet Academy
- Sevier County Schools:
  - Northview Primary School – grades K–3
  - Northview Intermediate School – grades 4–6
  - Northview Academy – grades 7–12

=== Community college ===
Strawberry Plains is home to a satellite campus of Pellissippi State Community College located in the Knox County portion of the community.

== Infrastructure ==
=== Transportation ===
All U.S. routes, state routes in Strawberry Plains, along with I-40, are maintained by the Tennessee Department of Transportation (TDOT) in TDOT Region 1, which consists of 24 counties in East Tennessee. Streets, sidewalks, and greenways in the Strawberry Plains area are maintained by the Knox County Engineering & Public Works Department, the Jefferson County Highway Department, or the City of Knoxville Engineering Department for portions inside the Knoxville city limits.

==== Principal highways ====
- I-40
- US 11E (Andrew Johnson Highway, Asheville Highway)
- US 25W
- US 70
- SR 9 (concurrent to US 70-US 25W)
- SR 34 (concurrent to US 11E)

==== Major surface routes ====
- SR 139 (Old Dandridge Pike)
- Big Bend Road
- Brakebill Road
- Mascot Road
- North Ruggles Ferry Pike
- Strawberry Plains Pike

== Notable people ==
- Ed Bailey (1931–2007), six-time MLB All-Star catcher
- Louise McBee (1924–2021), educator and Georgia state legislator
- Lucille Thornburgh (1908 – 1998), editor and labor organizer
