= White Pine, Tennessee =

Town in Jefferson and Hamblen counties in Tennessee, United States

White Pine
- Town
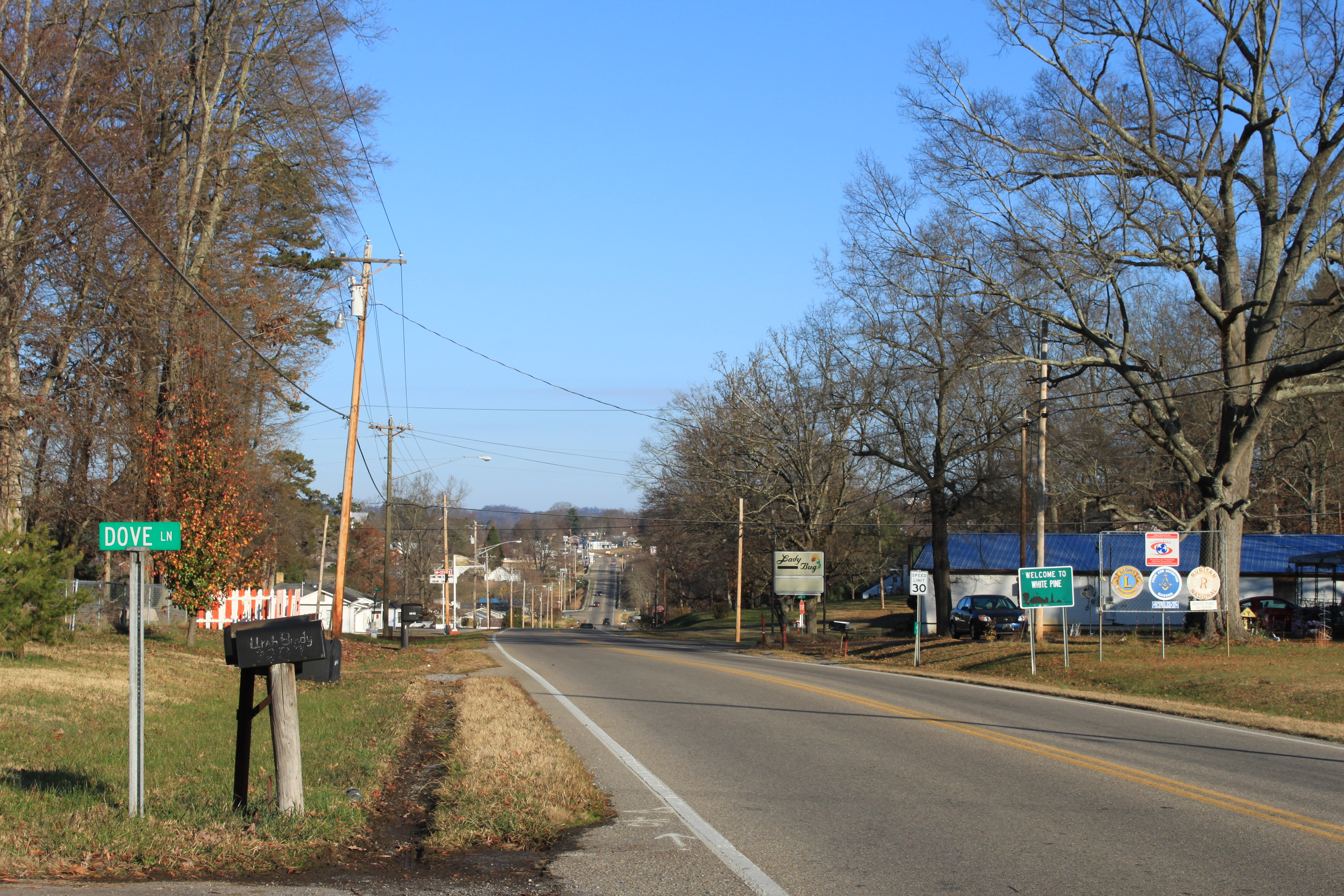
- S. State St./US 25E, facing north

- Seal
- Motto: "Deeply Rooted in Heritage & Proudly Growing Toward the Future"
- Location of White Pine in Jefferson and Hamblen counties in Tennessee
- Coordinates: 36°6′31″N 83°17′31″W
- Country: United States
- State: Tennessee
- Counties: Jefferson, Hamblen
- Settled: 1780s
- Founded: 1870
- Incorporated: 1915
- Named for: Eastern White Pine tree once prominently located in town's center

Government
  - Type: Mayor-aldermanic
  - Mayor: Glen Warren
  - Aldermen: List of Aldermen: Josh Sinard; Tyler Marshall; Lisa Arwood; Whitney Woods; Pam Walker

Area
  - Total: 2.87 sq mi (7.44 km^{2})
  - Land: 2.87 sq mi (7.44 km^{2})
  - Water: 0 sq mi (0.00 km^{2})
- Elevation: 1,150 ft (350 m)

Population (2020)
  - Total: 2,471
  - Density: 860.3/sq mi (332.16/km^{2})
- Time zone: UTC-5 (Eastern (EST))
  - Summer (DST): UTC-4 (EDT)
- ZIP code: 37890
- Area code: 865
- FIPS code: 47-80360
- GNIS feature ID: 2406879
- Website: whitepinetn.gov

White Pine is a town in Jefferson and Hamblen counties in Tennessee, United States. It is part of the Morristown metropolitan area. The population was 2,471 at the 2020 census.

== History ==
Before the settlement of the area by European settlers, the White Pine area was inhabited by an early group of Woodland Indians. The area was used by the group as a site for several large burial grounds and a trail used later by settlers of the community.

European settlers first arrived in present-day White Pine during the final years of the American Revolutionary War. The community was originally known as "Dandridge Crossing", based on its proximity to the Jefferson County seat, Dandridge. After the American Civil War, a railroad route was constructed in the area, crossing a prominent stagecoach path. The town was later founded in 1870 due to the growth of the area. The town was renamed to White Pine in 1873, after a large pine tree that once stood along Main Street. Twenty years later, White Pine was officially incorporated.

In 1905, a major portion of the town's downtown district was lost in a major fire, leading to the later dissolution of the town, In 1915, White Pine incorporated once again into a town after the completion of rebuilding efforts in the central business district. During the 19th and early 20th century, several businesses were established in the downtown area, including a medical clinic, a pharmacy, a hardware store, and a grocery store.

In 1926, White Pine High School was built in the town. It remained operational until 1976.

In 1963, construction began on Interstate 81 in White Pine. The later completion of I-81 prompted the relocation of businesses from White Pine's central business district to along the exits of I-81.

== Geography ==
White Pine is located in northeastern Jefferson County. The town limits extend north to the Hamblen County line, crossing into Hamblen County at Interstate 81 exit 8.

According to the United States Census Bureau, the town has a total area of 2.6 square miles (6.8 km^{2}), all land.

It is about 40 miles (64 km) east of Knoxville. The Southern and Southeastern border of White Pine runs along the Douglas Lake.

== Demographics ==
Historical population
Census	Pop.	Note	%±
1920	421		—
1930	516		22.6%
1940	497		−3.7%
1950	780		56.9%
1960	1,035		32.7%
1970	1,532		48.0%
1980	1,900		24.0%
1990	1,771		−6.8%
2000	1,997		12.8%
2010	2,196		10.0%
2020	2,471		12.5%
2024 (est.)	2,584	▲	4.6%

=== 2020 census ===
White Pine racial composition
Race	Number	Percentage
White (non-Hispanic)	1,998	80.86%
Black or African American (non-Hispanic)	31	1.25%
Native American	4	0.16%
Asian	21	0.85%
Pacific Islander	8	0.32%
Other/Mixed	97	3.93%
Hispanic or Latino	312	12.63%

As of the 2020 United States census, there were 2,471 people, 852 households, and 509 families residing in the town.

=== 2000 census ===
As of the census of 2000, there were 1,997 people, 828 households, and 579 families residing in the town. The population density was 786.7 inhabitants per square mile (303.7/km^{2}). There were 886 housing units at an average density of 349.0 units per square mile (134.7 units/km^{2}). The racial makeup of the town was 95.74% White, 0.90% African American, 0.20% Native American, 0.20% Asian, 2.20% from other races, and 0.75% from two or more races. Hispanic or Latino of any race were 2.50% of the population.

In the town, the population was spread out, with 24.2% under the age of 18, 8.7% from 18 to 24, 27.8% from 25 to 44, 23.8% from 45 to 64, and 15.5% who were 65 years of age or older. The median age was 37 years. For every 100 females, there were 89.5 males. For every 100 females age 18 and over, there were 83.8 males.

The median income for a household in the town was $25,078, and the median income for a family was $31,464. Males had a median income of $26,944 versus $22,989 for females. The per capita income for the town was $12,605. About 14.7% of families and 19.0% of the population were below the poverty line, including 22.4% of those under age 18 and 20.1% of those age 65 or over.

== Economy ==
Old Dominion Freight Line operates a regional logistics center in White Pine near exit 4 on I-81.

White Pine is also home to the Walters State Community College Great Smokies Mountain Expo Center. The Expo Center includes a 98,000 square-foot pavilion with a 300' x 150' show ring, seating for 3,900. Opened in 1996, the Expo Center hosts over 60 events each year, including horse and livestock shows, BMX racing, boat and RV shows, concerts, high school and college graduation ceremonies and rodeos.

== Arts and culture ==
From 2019 to 2022, the town hosted the annual Lakeside of the Smokies Balloonfest, a hot air balloon festival dedicated to promoting the sport of hot air ballooning and the area's significant agriculture and heritage. It is considered to be the largest hot air balloon festival in Tennessee. Beginning in 2023 it moved to Dandridge.

== Education ==
=== Public school ===
White Pine School (K-8) in White Pine is operated by the Jefferson County Schools District. White Pine high school students attend Jefferson County High School in neighboring Dandridge along with other students in the Jefferson County Schools District.

=== Private school ===
White Pine is also the location of Lakeway Christian Academy, a private Christian academy for students in grades 6–12. It opened in the summer of 2020.

== Transportation ==
White Pine has two exits on Interstate 81 (Exits 4 and 8). I-81 leads northeast 73 miles (117 km) to Bristol and southwest 6 miles (10 km) to its southern terminus at Interstate 40. Via I-81 and I-40, Knoxville is 41 miles (66 km) southwest of White Pine.

Tennessee State Route 113 is White Pine's Main Street, runs northeast to US 25E and southwest 10 miles (16 km) to Dandridge. Tennessee State Route 341 (also known as White Pine Road, Roy Messer Highway and Old Airport Road) runs west to east through the western and southern parts of the town, connecting I-81 at Exit 4 with US 25E.

U.S. Route 25E/Tennessee State Route 32 runs south to north through the town and is known as State Street. US 25E leads north 8 miles (13 km) to Morristown and south 12 miles (19 km) to Newport. Tennessee State Route 66 runs through a small portion of the western part of the town.

== Media ==
- Jefferson County Post – County paper published online daily
- The Standard Banner– County paper published bi-weekly
