= Saint Clair, Tennessee =

Unincorporated community in Tennessee, US

Coordinates: 36.3306503°N 83.0871099°W

Saint Clair (alternatively, St. Clair) is an unincorporated community in Hawkins County, Tennessee. Saint Clair is the location of Saint Clair Elementary School and a Volunteer Fire Department.
