= Kodak, Tennessee =

- Neighborhood of Sevierville
- Kodak
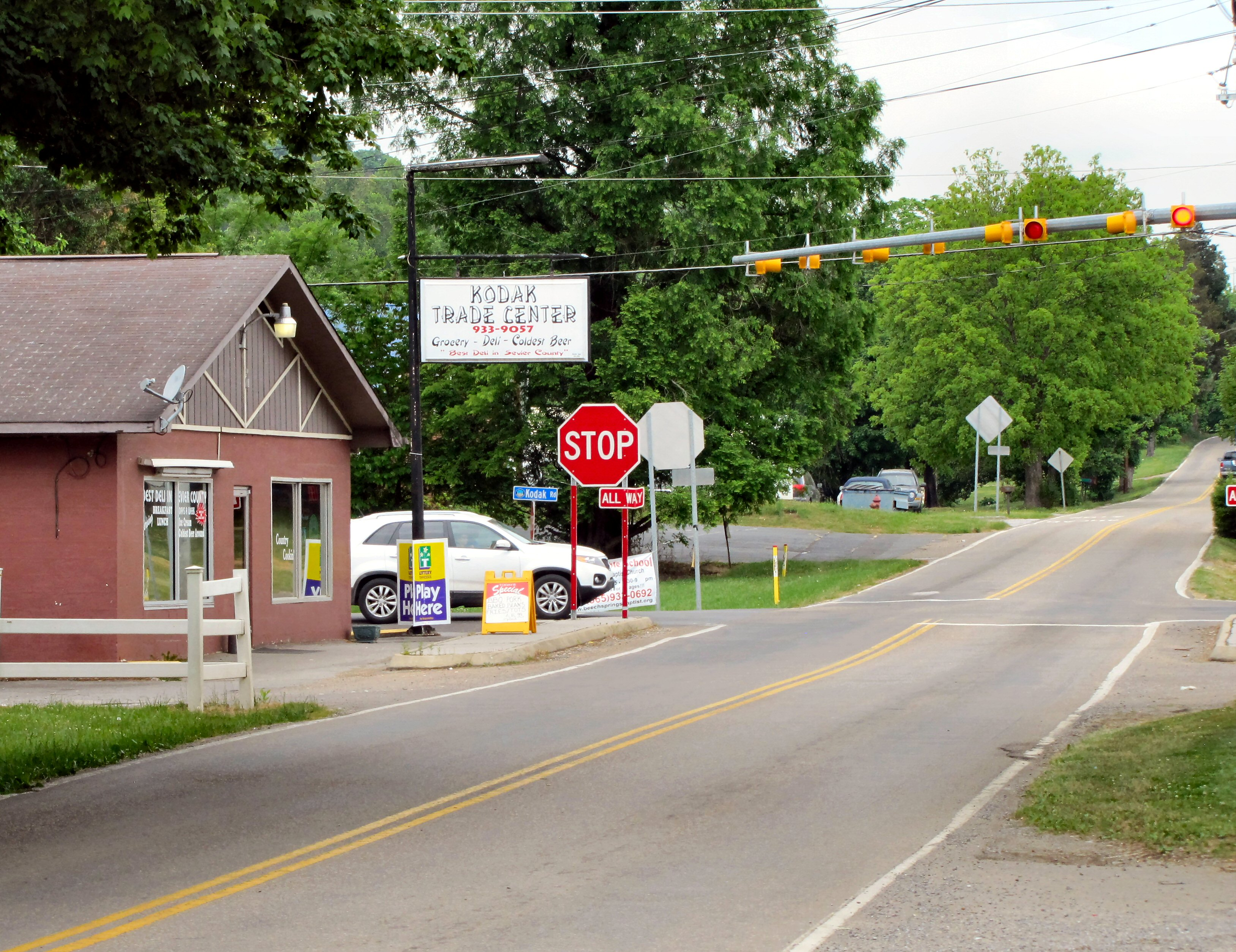
- Intersection of Douglas Dam Road (TN-139) and Kodak Road in Kodak

- Location within the State of Tennessee Kodak, Tennessee (the United States)
- Coordinates: 35°58′28″N 83°37′37″W
- Country: United States
- State: Tennessee
- County: Sevier
- City: Sevierville
- Elevation: 896 ft (273 m)
- Time zone: UTC-5 (Eastern Time Zone)
  - Summer (DST): UTC-4 (EDT)
- ZIP code: 37764
- Area code: 865
- GNIS feature ID: 1290403

Kodak is an unincorporated community and a neighborhood of Sevierville in Sevier County, Tennessee, United States. The community is located along State Route 139 and State Route 66, and just south of I-40 and east of Knoxville, Tennessee. The elevation of Kodak is about 896 feet (273 meters) above sea level.

The city of Kodak is included in Sevierville's urban growth boundary for future annexation.

== History ==
Kodak was named in 1892 when the local postmaster, Harvey N. Underwood, learned of the new "Kodak" brand of camera. Underwood decided that this was a name that was easy to remember and spell, hence he sought permission from the founder of Eastman Kodak, George Eastman, to use this name for his village and its post office. Eastman granted this permission. In 1989, a new post office building was constructed on Highway 66.

A large portion of Kodak along State Highway 66 and I-40 exit 407 has been annexed into the City of Sevierville since the 1990s.

=== The Treaty of Dumplin Creek ===
The Treaty of Dumplin Creek was signed at Maj. Hugh Henry's fort, in the area that would become Kodak, on June 10, 1785, between the proposed, never-recognized State of Franklin and the Cherokee tribe of Native Americans. The precise location of the treaty signing is not known and has been subject of archaeological investigation. According to a state historical marker placed at one site thought to be the location of the signing, commissioners involved in the treaty from the State of Franklin were John Sevier (namesake of the county in which Kodak sits), Alexander Outlaw, and Daniel Kennedy. The marker identifies the Cherokee signers as "the King of the Cherokee, Ancoo of Chota, Abraham of Chilhowee, The Sturgeon of Tallassee, the Bard of the Valley Towns and some thirty others." The treaty's effect was to open the East Tennessee counties of Blount, Hamblen, Jefferson, Knox and Sevier to white settlers and homesteaders without Native resistance. The historical marker incorrectly identifies this as the only treaty made by the State of Franklin, though there was at least one other (the Treaty of Coyatee, also with the Cherokee).

== Commerce ==
Exit 407 on Interstate 40, which is with SR 66 and the northern terminus of the Great Smoky Mountains Parkway, has many restaurants and several stores, including national and various local shops. A Buc-ee's opened in 2023 and it claims to be the world's largest convenience store. This interchange is the primary means of access to the Great Smoky Mountains National Park and the tourist attractions in Sevierville, Pigeon Forge, and Gatlinburg.

== Education ==
Schools in Kodak are a part of Sevier County Schools.

- Northview Primary School – grades K–3
- Northview Intermediate School – grades 4–6
- Northview Academy – grades 7–12

== Library ==
- Sevier County Public Library System - Kodak Branch Library | 319 W. Dumplin Valley Rd. | Kodak, TN 37764

== Points of interest ==
- Smokies Stadium
- Seven Islands State Birding Park
- Sevier County Public Library System - Kodak Branch Library
