= Talbott, Tennessee =

Talbott
- Unincorporated community
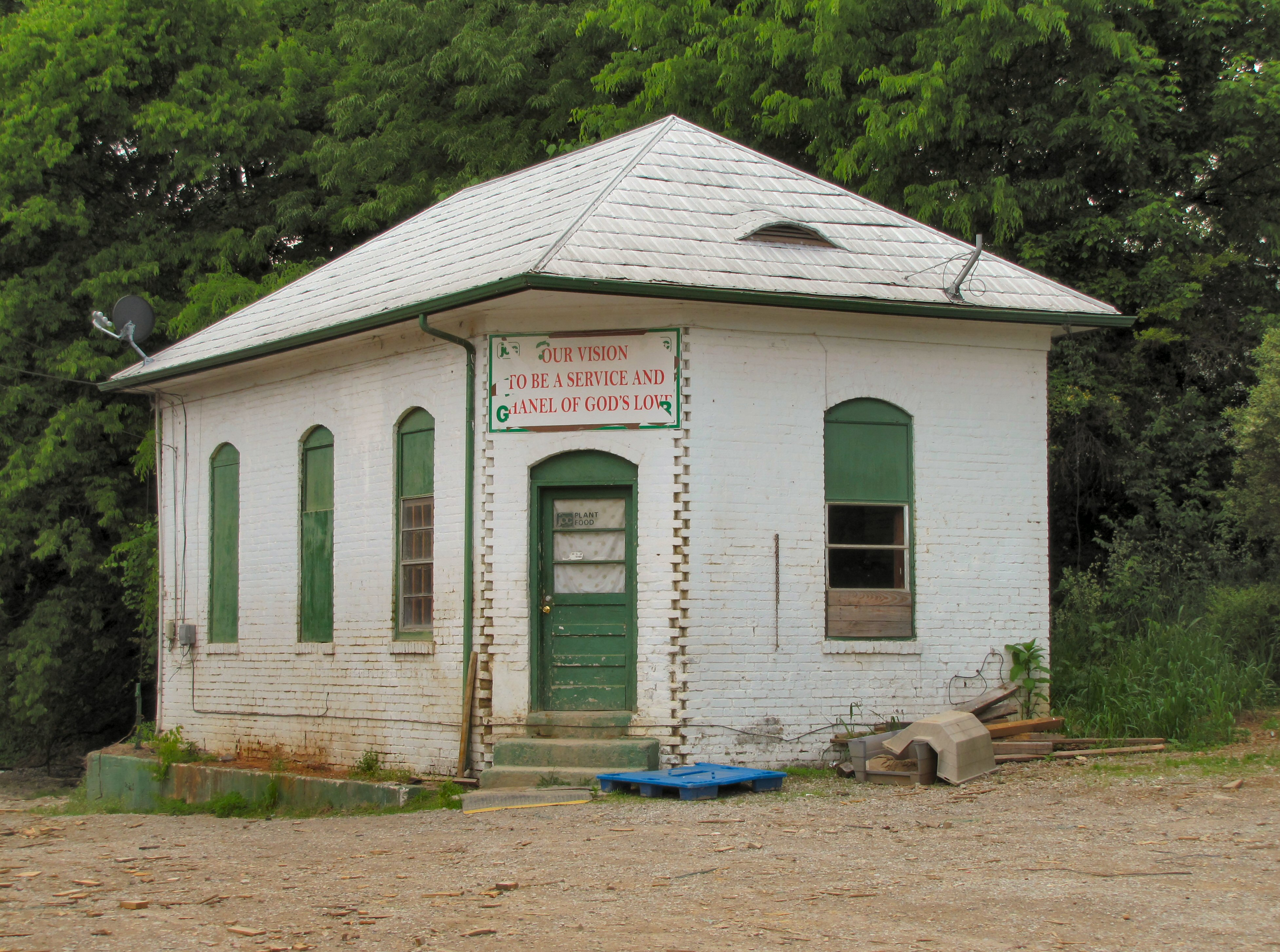

- Location within Tennessee Location within the United States
- Coordinates: 36°09′09″N 83°24′55″W
- Country: United States
- State: Tennessee
- Counties: Hamblen, Jefferson
- Elevation: 1,207 ft (368 m)
- Time zone: UTC-5 (Eastern (EST))
  - Summer (DST): UTC-4 (EDT)
- ZIP codes: 37877

Talbott is an unincorporated community in Hamblen and Jefferson counties in the U.S. state of Tennessee. The community is located on US Route 11E between Morristown and Jefferson City.

In 2020, the planning commission of the city of Morristown annexed a section of Talbott along U.S. Route 11E.
