= Tennessee State Route 35 =

Highway in Tennessee

State Route 35
- SR 35; primary in red, unsigned in green

Route information
- Maintained by TDOT
- Length: 81.35 mi (130.92 km)
- Existed: October 1, 1923–present

Major junctions
- South end: US 129 in Alcoa
- US 411 / SR 33 in Maryville; US 441 / SR 338 in Seymour; SR 66 in Sevierville; SR 448 in Sevierville; SR 449 in Sevierville; SR 92 in Chestnut Hill; I-40 in Newport; US 25 / US 70 / US 321 / SR 32 in Newport; SR 70 / SR 107 in Greeneville
- North end: US 11E / US 321 / SR 93 in Greenville

Location
- Country: United States
- State: Tennessee
- Counties: Blount, Sevier, Jefferson, Cocke, Greene

Highway system
- Tennessee State Routes; Interstate; US; State
← SR 34	→ SR 36

State Route 35 (SR 35) is a north–south state highway in East Tennessee. The 81.35-mile-long (130.92 km) state highway traverses Blount, Sevier, a small portion of Jefferson, Cocke, and Greene Counties. Most of the route is a secret, or hidden designation, as it runs concurrently with U.S. Highways in the area.

== Route description ==
=== Blount County ===
SR 35, alone, begins in Blount County at an interchange with US 129 (Alcoa Highway/SR 115) in Alcoa. SR 35 goes southeast as a 4-lane divided highway known as S Hall Road, where it passes through some residential areas before entering a major business district, where it downgrades to an undivided 4-lane, before crossing a bridge into downtown Maryville. It immediately becomes N Washington Street before coming to an intersection with US 411 and SR 33 (E/W Broadway Avenue), where SR 35 becomes unsigned as it becomes concurrent with US 411. They continue east through downtown before having an intersection with SR 447 and turning north onto High Street, where it downgrades to a 2-lane highway as it leaves downtown. US 411/SR 35 continue northeast through residential areas before leaving Maryville as Sevierville Road and passing through farmland and rural areas to cross the Brabson Ford Bridge over the Little River and pass through Wildwood before crossing into Sevier County.

=== Sevier County ===
US 411/SR 35 enter Seymour, where they pass through a couple of neighborhoods before coming to an intersection with US 441 (Chapman Highway/SR 71) and SR 338 (Boyds Creek Highway), where US 411/SR 35 turn right to begin a wrong-way concurrency with US 441/SR 71. Chapman Highway (US 411/US 441/SR 35/SR 71) goes east as a 4-lane undivided highway to pass through a major business district before leaving Seymour and entering mountains. The highway becomes narrow and curvy, but it does keep two travel lanes in each direction for several miles before widening to a divided highway. Chapman Highway continues east through rural areas before entering Sevierville, where it narrows to an undivided highway to pass through residential and commercial areas before crossing a bridge over the West Prong of the Little Pigeon River to enter downtown and come to an intersection with SR 66 (Great Smoky Mountains Parkway, Winfield Dunn Parkway), where US 441/SR 71 splits off and goes south along Forks of the River Parkway. US 411/SR 35 pass through downtown as Main Street, where they have an intersection with SR 448 (North Parkway) and Parkway, before continuing east through a business district as Dolly Parton Parkway. They then have an intersection with SR 449 (Veterans Boulevard) before leaving Sevierville and passing through Cherokee Hills, where they become Newport Highway and have intersections with SR 416 (Pittman Center Road) and SR 339 (Long Springs Road). US 411/SR 35 narrows to 2-lanes and passes through farmland and rural areas before crossing into Jefferson County.

=== Jefferson County ===
US 411/SR 35 becomes narrow and winding as it passes through rural areas before passing through Chestnut Hill, where it has an intersection with SR 92. The highway then turns northeast and winds its way through the mountains for several miles before widening to a 4-lane divided highway. They continue northeast through rural areas for several miles before crossing into Cocke County.

=== Cocke County ===
US 411/SR 35 pass through a rural area of Newport before coming to an intersection with US 25W/US 70 (Highway 25/SR 9), where US 411 ends and SR 35 becomes concurrent with that highway. They then have an interchange with I-40 (Exit 432 A/B) before passing through a residential and district as a 4-lane undivided highway. US 25W/US 70/SR 9/SR 35 then come to an intersection with US 25E/SR 32, where US 25W and US 25E merge to form US 25 and SR 32 joins the concurrency. The route becomes W Broadway Street as it passes more businesses before coming to an intersection with US 321 (Cosby Highway), where SR 32 turns south along US 321 while SR 35 turns north along US 321. US 321/SR 35 then narrow to two lanes as they piggyback through downtown along E Main Street, McMahan Avenue, a bridge over the Pigeon River, and North Street. They then pass through residential areas before leaving Newport and crossing a bridge over the French Broad River. US 321/SR 35 have an intersection with SR 160 before widening to a 4-lane divided highway to pass through Parrottsville, where it has an intersection with SR 340. They continue northeast through farmland and rural areas before crossing into Greene County.

=== Greene County ===
US 321/SR 35 narrow to 2-lanes and pass through rural areas to cross a bridge over the Nolichucky River. They continue northeast through the farmland of Greene County for several miles before having an intersection with SR 349 (Warrensburg Road) and entering Greeneville. They pass through a residential area before coming to an intersection with SR 70/SR 107 (Asheville Highway), where US 321/SR 35 become concurrent with SR 107 as they enter a business district as W Main Street. They then enter downtown as S Main Street, where they have concurrencies with SR 350 (E McKee Street/W Summer Street) and US 11E Business (W Summer Street/Tusculum Boulevard), with SR 107 turning east onto US 11E Business (Tusculum Boulevard). US 321/SR 35 leave downtown as N Main Street and continue north through residential areas to have an intersection with SR 172 (Baileyton Road) before SR 35 comes to an end at an intersection with US 11E (Andrew Johnson Highway/SR 34) and SR 93 (Kingsport Highway), with US 321 turning right to continue along US 11E/SR 34.

== Major intersections ==
County	Location	mi	km	Destinations	Notes
Blount	Alcoa	0.0	0.0	US 129 north (Alcoa Highway/SR 115 north) – Knoxville	Interchange; southern terminus; provides access to McGhee Tyson Airport; no access to southbound US 129/SR 115
Blount	Maryville	2.5	4.0	US 411 south (E Broadway Avenue) / SR 33 – Greenback, Vonore, Eagleton Village, Rockford	Southern end of US 411 concurrency; SR 35 becomes unsigned
Blount	Maryville			SR 447 south (S Washington Street) to US 321	Northern terminus of SR 447
Blount	Wildwood			Brabson Ford Bridge over the Little River	
Sevier	Seymour			US 441 north (Chapman Highway/SR 71 north) / SR 338 south (Boyds Creek Highway) – Knoxville, Sevierville	Southern end of wrong-way concurrency with US 441/SR 71 concurrency; southern terminus of SR 338
Sevier	Sevierville			Bridge over the West Prong of the Little Pigeon River	
Sevier	Sevierville			US 441 south (Forks of the River Parkway/SR 71 south) / SR 66 north (Winfield Dunn Parkway) to I-40 – Pigeon Forge, Kodak	Northern end of wrong-way US 441/SR 71 concurrency; southern terminus of SR 66
Sevier	Sevierville			SR 448 north (North Parkway) to SR 66 / I-40 Parkway south - Pigeon Forge	Southern terminus of SR 448
Sevier	Sevierville			SR 449 south (Veterans Boulevard) – Pigeon Forge	Northern terminus of SR 449; provides access to Dollywood
Sevier	Cherokee Hills			SR 416 south (Pittman Center Road) – Pittman Center	Northern terminus of SR 416
Sevier	Cherokee Hills			SR 339 east (Long Springs Road) – Cosby	Western terminus of SR 339
Jefferson	Chestnut Hill			SR 92 north (Chestnut Hill Road) – Dandridge	Southern terminus of SR 92
Cocke	Newport			US 25W north / US 70 west (SR 9 west) – Dandridge	Northern terminus of US 411; southern end of wrong-way US 25W/US 70/SR 9 concurrency
Cocke	Newport			I-40 – Knoxville, Asheville	I-40 exit 432 A/B
Cocke	Newport			US 25E north (Dixie Highway/SR 32 north) / US 25 begins – White Pine, Morristown	US 25W and US 25E merge to form US 25; southern end of US 25 and SR 32 wrong-way concurrency
Cocke	Newport			US 321 south / SR 32 south (Cosby Highway) to I-40 – Cosby	Southern end of US 321 concurrency; northern end of wrong-way SR 32 concurrency
Cocke	Newport			US 25 south / US 70 east (E Broadway Avenue/SR 9 east) – Del Rio, Hot Springs, NC	Northern end of wrong-way US 25/US 70/SR 9 concurrency
Cocke	Newport			Bridge over the Pigeon River	
Cocke				Bridge over the French Broad River	
Cocke				SR 160 north to I-81 – Lowland, Morristown	Southern terminus of SR 160
Cocke	Parrottsville			SR 340 – Del Rio, Warrensburg	
Greene				Bridge over the Nolichucky River	
Greene				SR 349 west (Warrensburg Road) – Warrensburg	Eastern terminus of SR 349
Greene	Greeneville			SR 70 / SR 107 west (Asheville Highway) – Persia, Rogersville, Del Rio, Asheville, NC	Southern end of SR 107 concurrency
Greene	Greeneville			SR 350 south (E McKee Street) – Camp Creek	southern end of wrong-way SR 350 concurrency
Greene	Greeneville			US 11E Bus. south (W Summer Street/SR 350 north)	Southern end of US 11E Business concurrency; northern end of wrong-way SR 350 concurrency
Greene	Greeneville			US 11E Bus. north / SR 107 east (Tusculum Boulevard) – Tusculum	Northern end of US 11E Business/SR 107 concurrency
Greene	Greeneville			SR 172 north (Baileyton Road) – Baileyton	Southern terminus of SR 172
Greene	Greeneville	81.35	130.92	US 11E / US 321 north (Andrew Johnson Highway/SR 34) / SR 93 north (Kingsport Highway) to I-81 – Mosheim, Tusculum, Fall Branch, Kingsport	Northern terminus; southern terminus of SR 93
1.000 mi = 1.609 km; 1.000 km = 0.621 mi: Concurrency terminus; Incomplete access; Route transition
