= Tennessee State Route 340 =

State highway in Tennessee, United States

State Route 340
- TN 340 highlighted in red

Route information
- Maintained by TDOT
- Length: 25.9 mi (41.7 km)
- Existed: July 1, 1983–present

Major junctions
- South end: US 25 / US 70 near Del Rio
- I-81 near Morristown
- North end: SR 113 near Morristown

Location
- Country: United States
- State: Tennessee
- Counties: Cocke, Greene, Hamblen

Highway system
- Tennessee State Routes; Interstate; US; State
← SR 339	→ SR 341

State Route 340 (SR 340) is a state highway in the eastern portion of the U.S. state of Tennessee. It travels south-to-north through portions of Cocke, Greene and Hamblen counties.

== Route description ==
=== Cocke County ===
SR 340 begins in the mountains of Cocke County at an intersection with US 25/US 70/SR 9 just west of Del Rio along the banks of the French Broad River. It winds its way northward through the mountains before entering farmland and passing through Parrottsville, where it has an intersection with US 321/SR 35. It then passes through some ridges and rolling countryside before crossing into Greene County.

=== Greene County ===
SR 340 then crosses a bridge over the Nolichucky River before turning northeast to run parallel to the river and have an intersection SR 349. It continues northeast through farmland to pass through Warrensburg before having an intersection with SR 348. Shortly afterwards, SR 340 crosses into Hamblen County.

=== Hamblen County ===
SR 340 then leaves the riverbanks and has an interchange with I-81 (Exit 15). The highway continues northeast through farmland before coming to an end at an intersection with SR 113.

== Road concurrencies and mileage ==
Road Name	To/From	Mileage
Highway 340 South	From US 25/US 70 near Del Rio to Old Parrottsville Highway in Parrottsville.	5.6
Old Parrottsville Highway / Old Highway 321	From Highway 340 South to Old Parrottsville Highway	0.3
Highway 340 North	From Old Parrottsville Highway to Greene/Cocke County line	6.5
Bewleys Chapel Road	From Greene/Cocke County line to SR 349	3.1
Warrensburg Road	From SR 349 to Warrensburg at Fish Hatchery Road, Mason Lodge Road and South Mohawk Road	1.4
Fish Hatchery Road	From Warrensburg to SR 113	9.0

== Major intersections ==
County	Location	mi	km	Destinations	Notes
Cocke		0	0.0	US 25 / US 70 (SR 9) – Newport, Hot Springs	Southern terminus
Cocke	Parrottsville			US 321 (SR 35) – Newport, Greeneville	
Greene				SR 349 east (Warrensburg Road) – Greeneville	Western terminus of SR 349
Greene				SR 348 east (McDonald Road) – McDonald, Midway, Mosheim	Western terminus of SR 348
Hamblen				I-81 – Knoxville, Bristol	I-81 exit 15
Hamblen		25.9	41.7	SR 113 (Silver City Road / Fish Hatchery Road) – White Pine, Whitesburg	Northern terminus
1.000 mi = 1.609 km; 1.000 km = 0.621 mi
