= Tennessee State Route 339 =

Highway in Tennessee

State Route 339
- TN 339 highlighted in red

Route information
- Maintained by TDOT
- Length: 23.1 mi (37.2 km)
- Existed: July 1, 1983–present

Major junctions
- West end: US 411 in Cherokee Hills
- East end: US 321 / SR 32 in Cosby

Location
- Country: United States
- State: Tennessee
- Counties: Sevier, Cocke

Highway system
- Tennessee State Routes; Interstate; US; State
| ← SR 338 | → SR 340 |

State Route 339 (SR 339) is a 23.1 miles (37.2 km) long east-west state highway in the mountains of East Tennessee, connecting Cherokee Hills with Cosby. For the majority of its length, SR 339 is known as Jones Cove Road, but other short sections are known as Long Springs Road and Old Newport Highway.

== Route description ==
SR 339 begins as Long Springs Road in Sevier County in Cherokee Hills at an intersection with US 411 (SR 35). It goes southeast through farmland to an intersection with Old Newport Highway, which it follows for approximately 1.3 miles. It then turns right onto Jones Cove Road and winds its way east through farmland and rural areas, paralleling the East Prong of the Little Pigeon River for most of the river's remaining length. The highway then passes through rugged mountainous terrain at the foot of English Mountain for several miles before crossing into Cocke County. SR 339 then enters Cosby and passes through farmland for a short distance before coming to an end at an intersection with US 321/SR 32 (SR 73). The entire route of SR 339 is a two-lane highway.

On some maps, and Google Earth, show SR 339 continuing east past US 321/SR 32 to I-40 near Hartford. However, this is the eastern segment of the Foothills Parkway (section 8A), not SR 339, nor does TDOT recognize this as SR 339. Google Maps has since removed this designation as early as 2022.

== Major intersections ==
| County | Location | mi | km | Destinations | Notes |
|---|---|---|---|---|---|
| Sevier | Cherokee Hills | 0 | 0.0 | US 411 (Newport Highway/SR 35) – Sevierville, Newport | Western terminus |
| Sevier | | | | Dixon Branch Road To SR 416 | |
| Cocke | Cosby | 23.1 | 37.2 | US 321 / SR 32 (Cosby Highway/SR 73) to I-40 – Gatlinburg, Newport | Eastern terminus; provides access to the Foothills Parkway and the Great Smoky Mountains National Park |
1.000 mi = 1.609 km; 1.000 km = 0.621 mi
