= Tennessee State Route 348 =

Highway in Tennessee

State Route 348
- TN 348 highlighted in red

Route information
- Maintained by TDOT
- Length: 12.1 mi (19.5 km)
- Existed: July 1, 1983–present

Major junctions
- West end: SR 340 near Warrensburg
- East end: US 11E in Mosheim

Location
- Country: United States
- State: Tennessee
- Counties: Greene

Highway system
- Tennessee State Routes; Interstate; US; State
← SR 347	→ SR 349

State Route 348 (SR 348) is a 12-mile-long (19 km) state highway in western Greene County, Tennessee. It serves the town of Mosheim and the communities of Midway, McDonald, Mohawk and Warrensburg.

== Route description ==
SR 348 begins at an intersection with SR 340 (Fish Hatchery Road) in extreme western Greene County. It begins as McDonald Road and goes east toward Midway and like most roads in eastern Tennessee it is rather curvy. Before the route reaches Midway it passes through a small community called McDonald, it has only a volunteer fire department and an elementary School and of course some houses. In Midway SR 348 comes to an intersection with Midway Railroad Street which goes east and SR 348 turns south for a very short time and comes to a three-way intersection at which McDonald Road ends, Little Chuckey Road goes south and SR 348 turns east onto Midway Road. In Midway the route passes through Midway's "downtown" area. SR 348 passes over a railroad line and enters Mosheim city limits and passes West Greene High School and comes to an end at an intersection with US 11E/SR 34.

== Major intersections ==
The entire route is in Greene County.

Location	mi	km	Destinations	Notes
Warrensburg	0.0	0.0	SR 340 (Fish Hatchery Road) – Parrottsville, Russellville	Western terminus
Mosheim	12.1	19.5	US 11E (West Andrew Johnson Highway/SR 34) – Greeneville, Bulls Gap	Eastern terminus
1.000 mi = 1.609 km; 1.000 km = 0.621 mi
