= Tennessee State Route 349 =

Highway in Tennessee

Coordinates: 36.118°N 82.978°W

State Route 349
- Warrensburg Road
- TN 349 highlighted in red

Route information
- Maintained by TDOT
- Length: 13.2 mi (21.2 km)
- Existed: July 1, 1983–present

Major junctions
- West end: SR 340 near Warrensburg
- East end: US 321 near Greeneville

Location
- Country: United States
- State: Tennessee
- Counties: Greene

Highway system
- Tennessee State Routes; Interstate; US; State
← SR 348	→ SR 350

State Route 349 (SR 349) is a state highway in Greene County within the U.S. state of Tennessee.

== Route description ==
SR 349 connects SR 340 just south of Warrensburg to US 321/SR 35 on the south side of Greeneville. It travels through farmland and rural areas for its entire length, not passing through any other communities or towns. SR 349 is known as Warrensburg Road for its entire duration.

== Major intersections ==
The entire route is in Greene County.

Location	mi	km	Destinations	Notes
	0.0	0.0	SR 340 (Warrensburg Road/Bewley's Chapel Road)	Western terminus
Greeneville	13.2	21.2	US 321 (Newport Highway/SR 35) – Newport, Greeneville	Eastern terminus
1.000 mi = 1.609 km; 1.000 km = 0.621 mi
