= U.S. Route 25 in Tennessee =

United States Numbered Highway in Tennessee

U.S. Route 25

Route information
- Maintained by TDOT
- Length: 20.2 mi (32.5 km)
- Existed: 1926–present
- Tourist routes: East Tennessee Crossing Byway

Major junctions
- South end: US 25 / US 70 at the North Carolina state line in Cocke County
- US 321 in Newport
- North end: US 25W / US 25E / US 70 in Newport

Location
- Country: United States
- State: Tennessee
- Counties: Cocke

Highway system
- United States Numbered Highway System; List; Special; Divided; Tennessee State Routes; Interstate; US; State
| ← SR 24 | → US 25E |

U.S. Route 25 (US 25) in the state of Tennessee runs northwest from North Carolina and runs concurrently with US 70 for its entire length until splitting into US 25W and US 25E in Newport. Despite being a north-south U.S. route, it is actually geographically east-west.

== Route description ==
The Tennessee section of US 25 begins at the North Carolina state line near Del Rio, concurrent with US 70 and unsigned State Route 9 (SR 9). US 25/US 70/SR 9 then goes through some curves and cross the French Broad River via the Wolf Creek Bridge. They then begin running along the north bank of the French Broad River, intersect and become concurrent with SR 107, and then enter Del Rio, where SR 107 separates. US 25/US 70/SR 9 continue northwest to intersect SR 340 before leaving Del Rio. They then cross the French Broad River again, before entering Newport, leaving the French Broad River, and crossing the Pigeon River. In Newport, they intersect SR 73 before entering downtown. In downtown, they intersect and become concurrent with US 321 and unsigned SR 35. US 321 separates shortly afterward at the intersection with SR 32, where US 321 goes south on SR 32 and SR 32 joins the concurrency. US 25/US 70/SR 9/SR 35 then leave downtown and come to where US 25 splits into US 25W and US 25E. Here, SR 32 goes north on US 25E and US 70/SR 9/SR 35 continue on US 25W.

== Major intersections ==
| County | Location | mi | km | Destinations | Notes |
|---|---|---|---|---|---|
| Madison | Cherokee National Forest | 0.0 | 0.0 | US 25 south / US 70 east (NW Hwy 25-70) – Hot Springs | Continuation into North Carolina; southern end of unsigned SR 9 concurrency |
| Cocke | Cherokee National Forest | 3.2– 3.3 | 5.1– 5.3 | Wolf Creek Bridge over the French Broad River | |
| Cocke | | 4.4 | 7.1 | SR 107 east – Greeneville | Southern end of SR 107 concurrency |
| Cocke | Del Rio | 7.6 | 12.2 | SR 107 west – Del Rio | Northern end of SR 107 concurrency |
| Cocke | | 10.2 | 16.4 | SR 340 north – Parrottsville | Southern terminus of SR 340 |
| Cocke | | 14.1– 14.3 | 22.7– 23.0 | Major J.T. Huff Bridge over the French Broad River | |
| Cocke | Newport | 17.8 | 28.6 | SR 73 south (Wilton Springs Road) – Cosby | Northern terminus of SR 73 |
| Cocke | Newport | 17.9– 18.0 | 28.8– 29.0 | John W. Fisher Bridge over the Pigeon River | |
| Cocke | Newport | 18.8 | 30.3 | US 321 north (McMahon Avenue/SR 35) – Greeneville | Southern end of US 321/SR 35 concurrency |
| Cocke | Newport | 19.1 | 30.7 | US 321 south / SR 32 south (Cosby Highway) – Cosby, Gatlinburg | Southern end of SR 32 concurrency; northern end of US 321 concurrency |
| Cocke | Newport | 20.2 | 32.5 | US 25E north (Dixie Highway/SR 32) / US 25W north / US 70 west (W Broadway Street/SR 9/SR 35) – White Pine, Morristown, Dandridge | Northern end of SR 32 concurrency; US 25 splits into US 25W and US 25E |
1.000 mi = 1.609 km; 1.000 km = 0.621 mi: Concurrency terminus

U.S. Route 25
| Previous state: North Carolina | Tennessee | Next state: Kentucky |
