= Del Rio, Tennessee =

- Unincorporated community
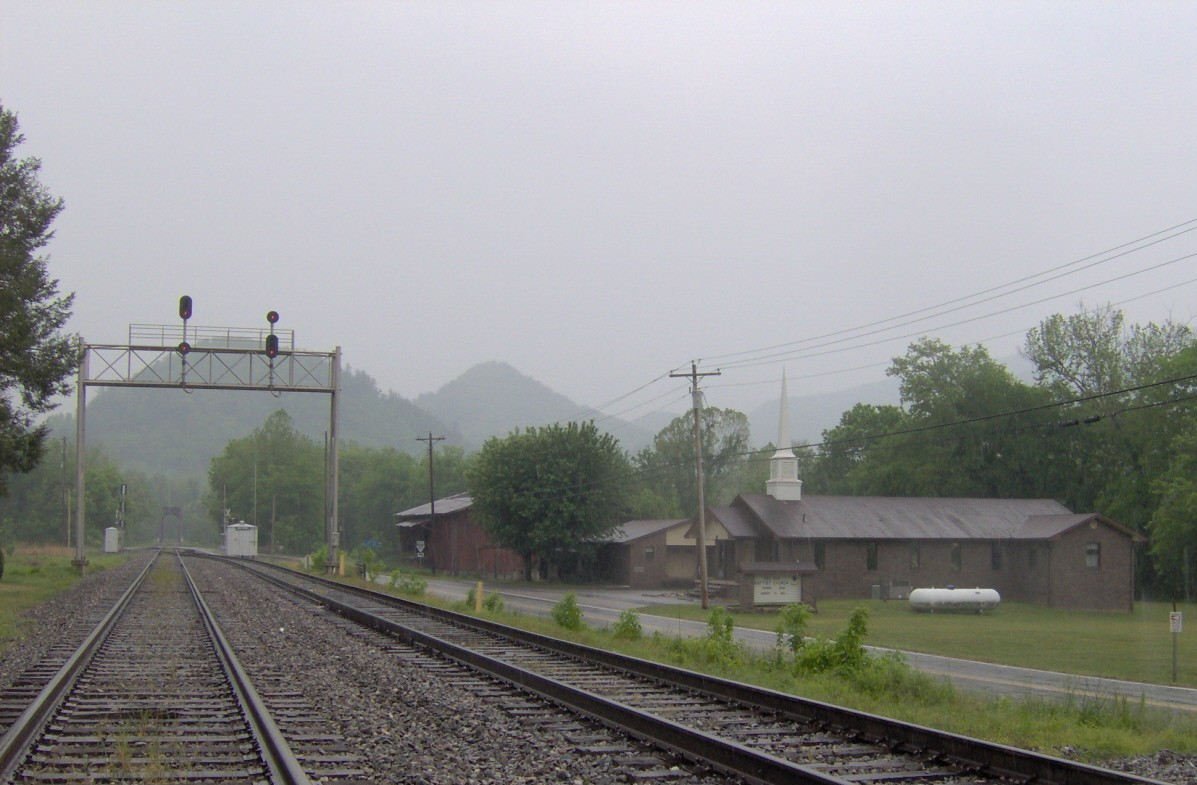
- Del Rio, Tennessee

- Location within the state of Tennessee Del Rio (the United States)
- Coordinates: 35°55′11″N 83°1′33″W
- Country: United States
- State: Tennessee
- County: Cocke
- Elevation: 1,132 ft (345 m)

Population (2000)
  - Total: 2,138
- Time zone: UTC-5 (Eastern (EST))
  - Summer (DST): UTC-4 (EDT)
- GNIS feature ID: 1328045

Del Rio is an unincorporated community in Cocke County, Tennessee, United States. Although it is not a census-designated place, the ZIP Code Tabulation Area for the ZIP Code (37727) that serves Del Rio had a population of 2,138, according to the 2000 census. El Pano is a fictionalized version of Del Rio which features in a blockbuster 20th-century Christian novel and the TV series and films based on it.

== Demographics ==
As of the census of 2000, there were 2,138 people, 1,119 households, and 611 families residing in the Zip Code Tabulation Area for the zip code (37727) that serves Del Rio. The racial makeup of this area was 98.2% White, 0.1% Native American and 0.1% African American. Hispanics and Latinos made up 0.7% of the population.

Of the 2,091 households, 21.2% had children under the age of 18 living with them, 55.6% were married couples living together, 9.9% had a female householder with no husband present, and 29.7% were non-families. 25.8% of all households were made up of individuals, and 10.8% had someone living alone who was 65 years of age or older. The average household size was 2.46 and the average family size was 2.95.

76.8% of the population was 18 years of age or older with 12.4% being 65 years of age or older. The median age was 39.7 years. The population was 50.5% male and 49.5% female.

The median income for a household in the area was $23,333, and the median income for a family was $28,504. The per capita income for the area was $11,656. About 18.2% of families and 22.0% of the population were below the poverty line.

== Geography ==
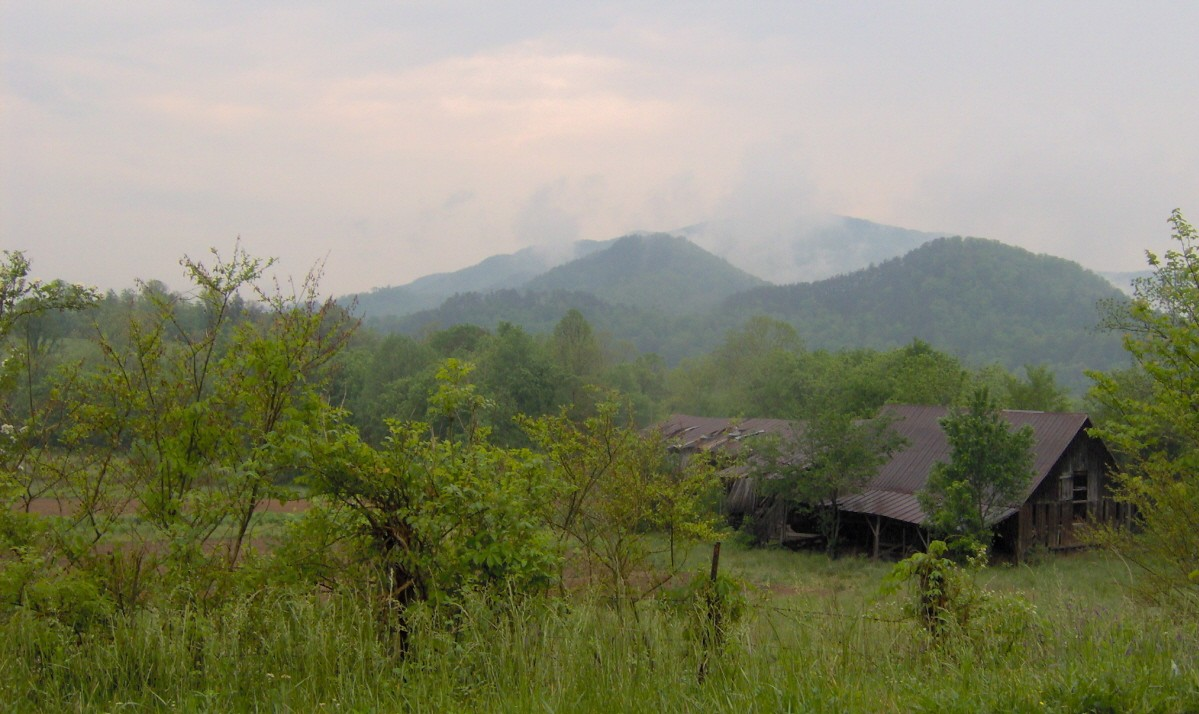
Stone Mountain rising prominently above Del Rio

Del Rio is located at 35°55′11″N 83°1′32″W. The community is situated around the confluence of the French Broad River and Big Creek, the latter of which has its source high in the mountains to the south. In recent years, the town's central area has shifted to the junction of U.S. Route 25/U.S. Route 70 (US 25/70) and State Route 107 (SR 107), along the north side of the French Broad.

The Appalachian Mountains surround Del Rio on all sides, and, along with the river, have been the key influence on the town's economic and cultural development. Stone Mountain rises some 2,000 feet (610 m) above Del Rio to the west. Snowbird Mountain and Max Patch Bald, both of which are traversed by the Appalachian Trail, rise over 3,000 feet (910 m) to the south. The Bald Mountains are to the east, and Neddy Mountain and Meadow Creek Mountain are to the north. The Cherokee National Forest borders much of Del Rio to the south and east.

Along US 25/70, Newport, Tennessee, is just over 10 miles (16 km) to the west, and Hot Springs, North Carolina, is nearly 15 miles (24 km) to the east. Del Rio is roughly halfway between Knoxville, Tennessee, and Asheville, North Carolina. SR 107 connects Del Rio to a remote valley known as Lemon Gap, at the base of Max Patch Bald.

Like most Appalachian communities, Del Rio has several "satellite" towns, formed as early settlers branched out over the limited bottomlands in the mountain gaps and narrow coves. Among these are Nough (sometimes called "Slabtown") along Big Creek to the south, Paint Rock, which is further up the French Broad to the east, and Harmony Grove, to the southeast.

Nough is the birthplace of opera singer and actress Grace Moore. The Catherine Marshall novel Christy takes place at Chapel Hollow (called "Cutter Gap" in the novel), a small valley just west of Del Rio.

== History ==
=== Early history ===
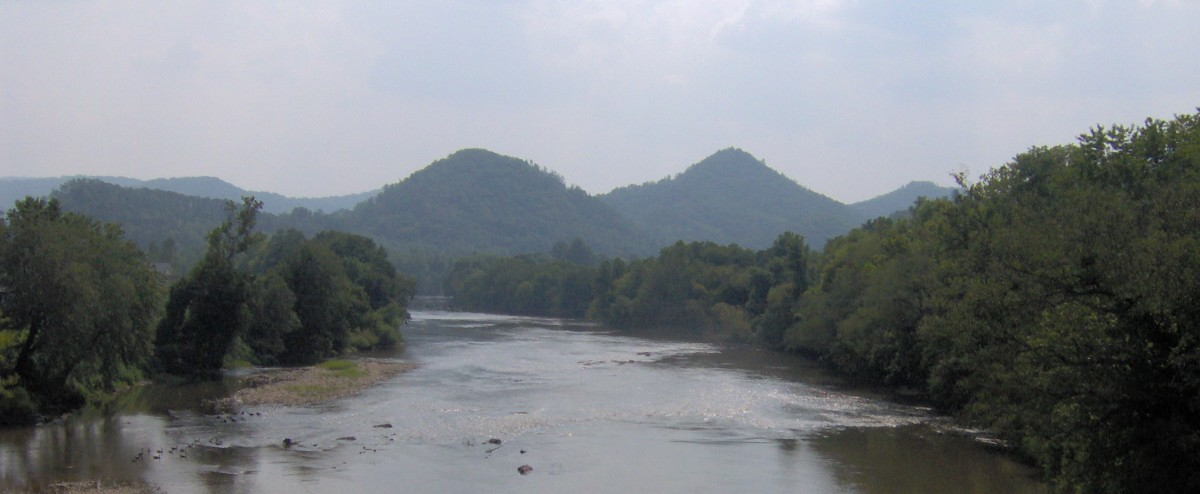
The French Broad River in Del Rio

A Native American village once occupied the site along the French Broad River where Del Rio is now situated. Frank Stokely, who lived in the area in the mid-20th century, collected a large number of artifacts left by the natives of this village and displayed them in a small museum. The Knoxville Chapter of the Tennessee Archaeological Society also conducted excavations in the area.

The first European settler in what is now Del Rio was John Huff (1758–1843), a veteran of the American Revolution, and his wife Mary Corder (1766–1842). Huff, a hunter and trapper, received a 400-acre (1.6 km^{2}) land grant at the confluence of Long Creek and the French Broad. Arriving around 1784, the Huffs erected a small blockhouse known as Huff's Fort, which would serve as a stopping post for stagecoaches traveling between Knoxville, Tennessee, and Warm Springs (now Hot Springs) in North Carolina. The community that arose in the vicinity became known as Big Creek.

Shortly after the Huffs arrived, another Revolutionary War veteran, Jehu Stokely (1747–1816), settled in the Big Creek area. According to family lore, Stokely was impressed into the British navy, but escaped and fought under American captain John Paul Jones. Stokely's tract was just over 3 miles (5 km) east of Huff's Fort. John Fugate (1764–1837), also a veteran of the Revolution, settled in the Paint Rock area. In 1986, the community held a ceremony marking Fugate's grave as a Revolutionary War hero.

In the decade following Huff's arrival, the constant stream of Euro-American settlers into East Tennessee agitated the Cherokee, who had lived and hunted in the region for centuries. Cattle were stolen, and some settlers were scalped and murdered, leading to massive reprisal attacks on Cherokee villages. Between 1783, a series of forts sprang in Cocke County along the Pigeon River and the French Broad, one being Wood's Fort near modern Edwina, just west of Del Rio. Historian J.G.M. Ramsey reports that by 1793, a series of blockhouses lined the French Broad, including the previously mentioned Huff's (which Ramsey spells "Hough's"), one at Paint Rock, one at Burnt Cane, and another at Warm Springs. Guards stationed at the blockhouses regularly patrolled the area. A treaty at the Tellico Blockhouse in 1794 eased much of the violence, although sporadic attacks occurred for years afterward.

=== 19th century ===
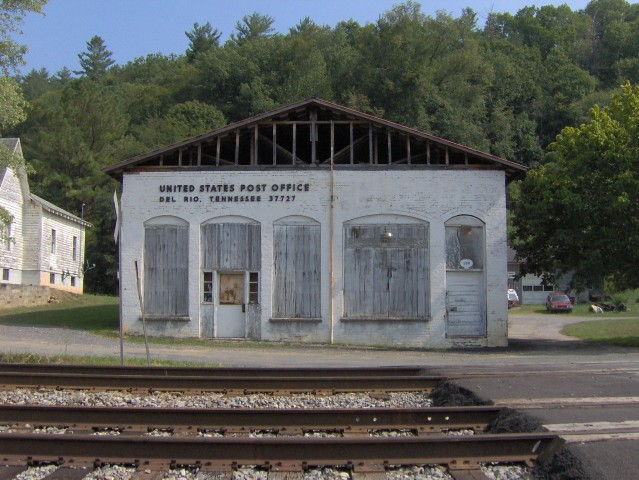
The old post office in Del Rio

As the threat of Cherokee attacks declined, Big Creek slowly transformed itself into a stopping point for pioneers crossing the mountains en route to Tennessee. The Huff family converted their fort to an inn, and Jehu's son, Royal, opened a frontier trading post. Throughout the 19th century, the Allen family operated a 13-room log inn at nearby Wolf Creek. Most early settlers raised cattle, which they would drive across the mountains to sell in North Carolina.

Big Creek received a major economic boost in 1868, when the Southern Railway established a railroad line between Morristown, Tennessee, and Wolf Creek. Big Creek Station was established in 1870 near what is now the old post office, just south of the river. While the railroad brought benefits, it also brought confusion in the postal system, since there was another town in Tennessee already using the name "Big Creek". The town decided to change its name, and after weighing several suggestions, chose the name "Del Rio", which is Spanish for "from the river."

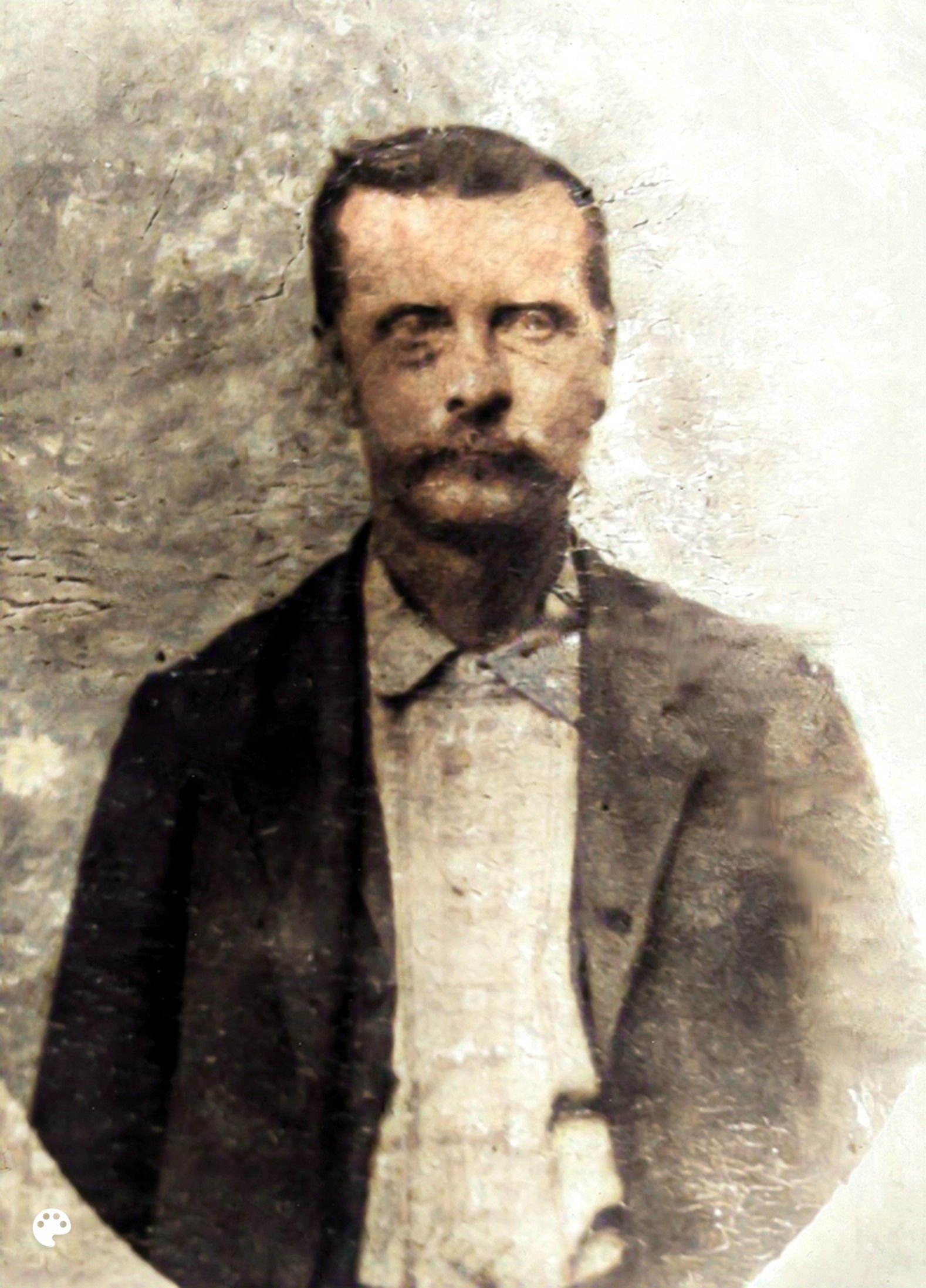
William Harmon Teaster

The newly named Del Rio quickly grew into a major shipping hub for lumber and shingles. Cocke County's first newspaper, The Excelsior, was established at Del Rio in 1875. In the 1880s and 1890s, high demand and innovations such as the band saw brought about a boom in the lumber industry. After lowland forests were wiped out, lumber companies turned to the ancient forests of Appalachia to satisfy the increasing demand. Del Rio, perfectly situated at the base of the mountains, had become the center of a large logging operation by 1900. Lumber camps crept deeper and deeper up the mountain slopes, with the high camp of Boomer operating at 3,000 feet (910 m), near the source of Big Creek, some 10 miles (16 km) south of Del Rio.

=== 1905 explosion of the T. J. Salts Lumber Company ===
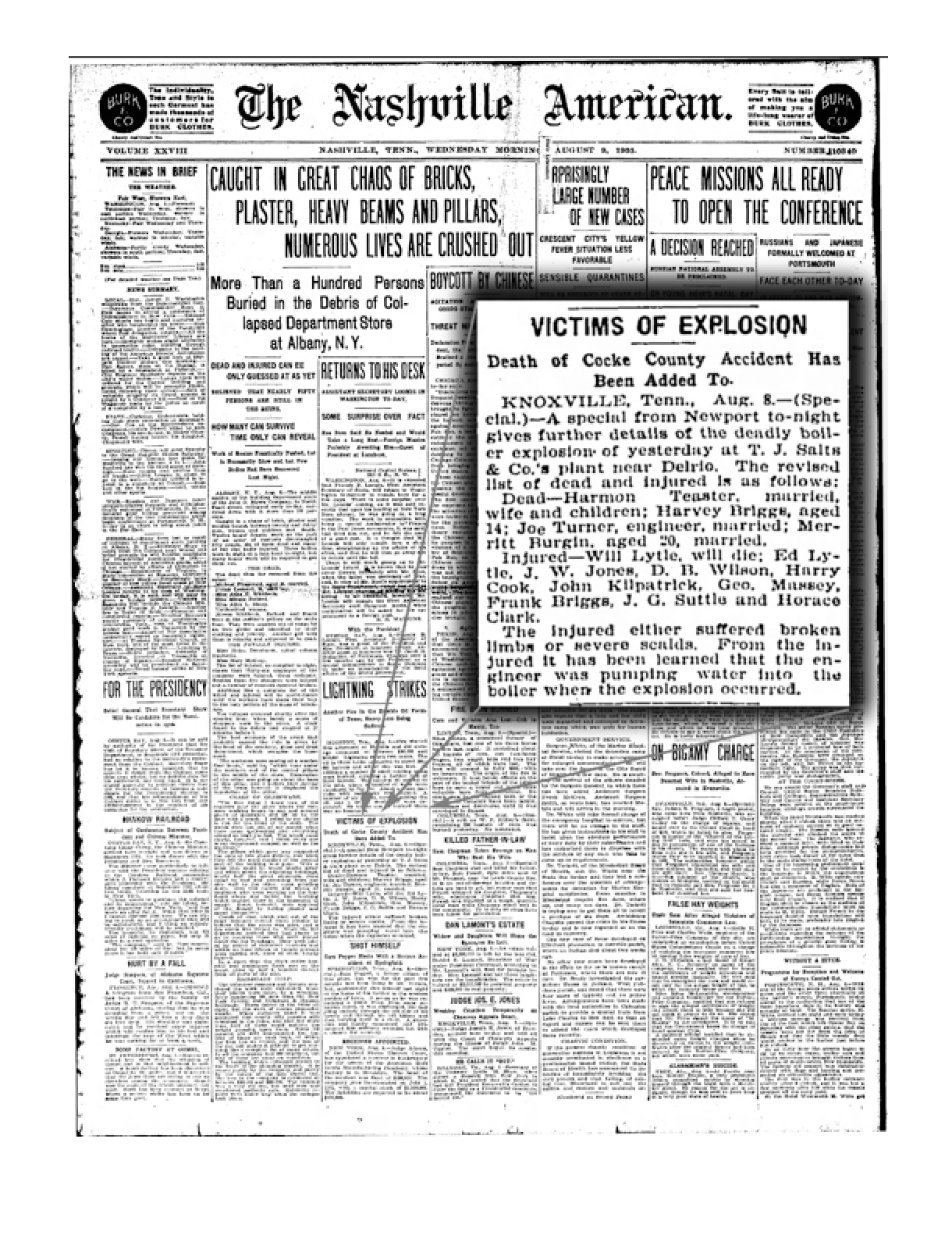
The Nashville American newspaper, August 9, 1905

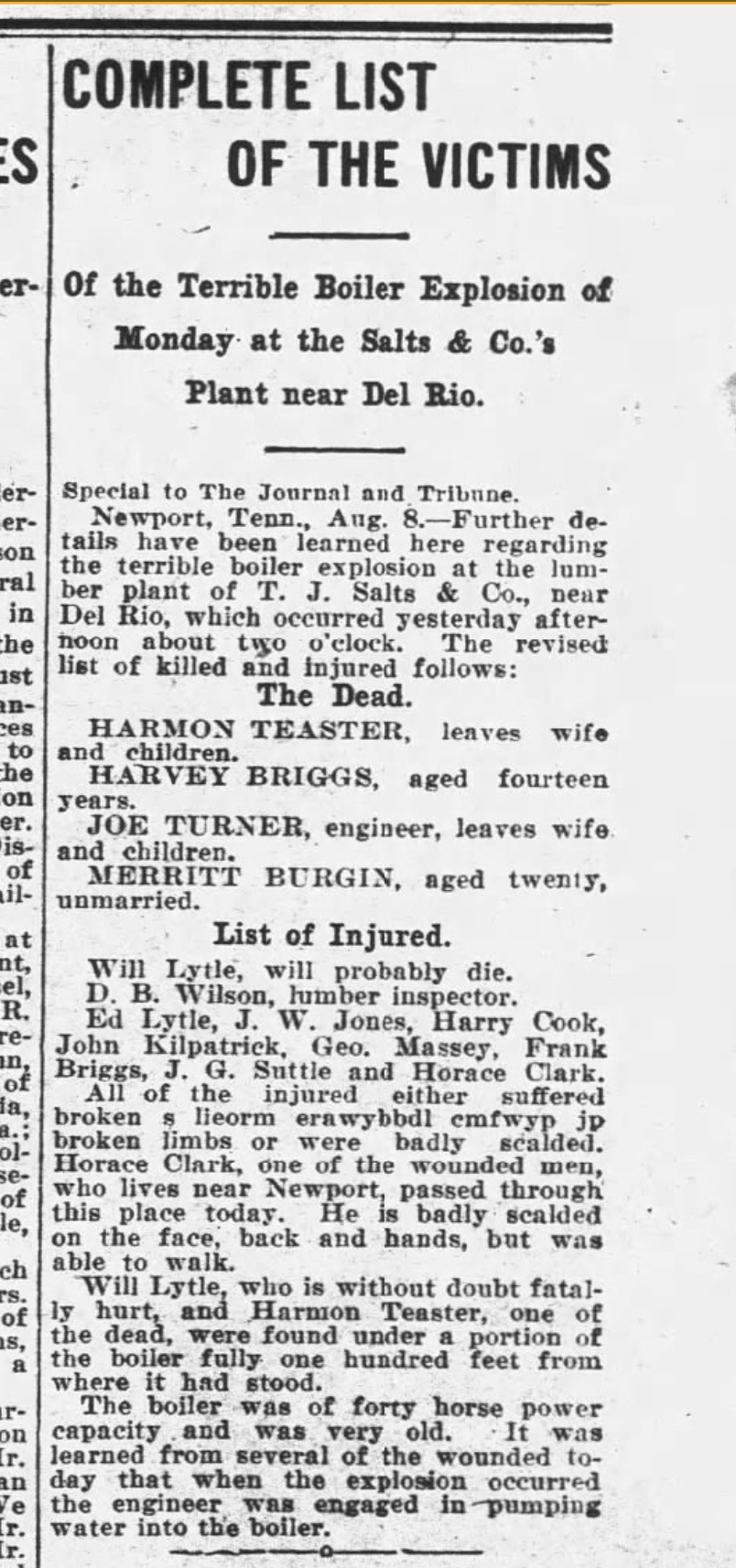
List of the dead and injured from the explosion

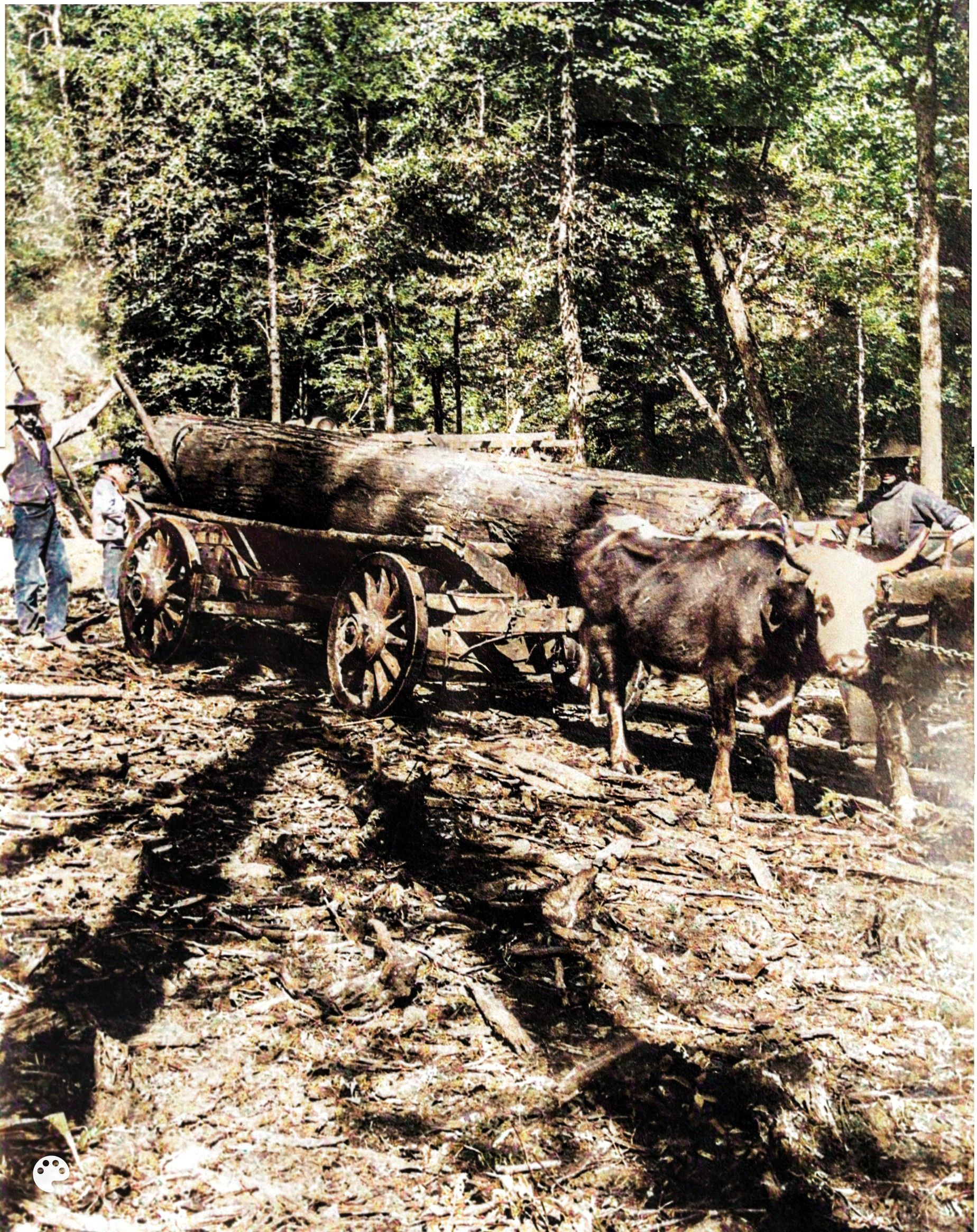
William Harmon Teaster and son Ransom McGuire standing with his oxen team

On August 7, 1905, just outside of the town of Del Rio in the remote area known as Dry Fork, a huge explosion occurred from an overheated boiler that ran a 40-horsepower lumber saw at the T.J. Salts Lumber Company. A fierce storm had occurred when the men sought shelter underneath the boiler shed. When the storm passed, the news states that the engineer Joe Turner had started pumping water into the boiler when an explosion occurred. Reports stated that bodies were blown 100 feet away. William Harmon Teaster's body was found 100 feet away underneath a portion of the boiler.

The deceased who were reported on that day were William Harmon Teaster who ran a team of oxen; Joe Turner, the engineer; Frank Plate; Merritt Burgin; and Harvey Briggs, 14 years old. The newspapers stated that some of the injured men would die soon. The injured were reported to be John W. Kilpatrick; Daniel Boone Wilson, the lumber inspector; Edmond Lytle; William Henry Lytle; James George Suttle; Frank Briggs; George Massey; Harry Cook; J. W. Jones; Horace E. Clark; and Murray Ford. Most news reports at that time were not all-inclusive in their reporting, nor did they spell the names of all of the victims correctly.

At the Big Hill Cemetery in Del Rio, some 20 feet from the body of William Harmon Teaster, are three remaining of what were originally four unmarked graves containing the remains of the men who died that day. They were buried immediately after the explosion, with no funerals. At some point long after the explosion, the family of one of the victims had his remains exhumed and moved to their family cemetery in another state. The name of that exhumed victim has not been discovered yet. Today, the information on these remaining unmarked graves only contain a blank stone marker. TJSalts.Squarespace.com. The men who were originally buried in the unmarked graves were Joe Turner, Merritt Burgin, Harvey "Harve" Briggs, and Frank Plate.

=== 20th century ===
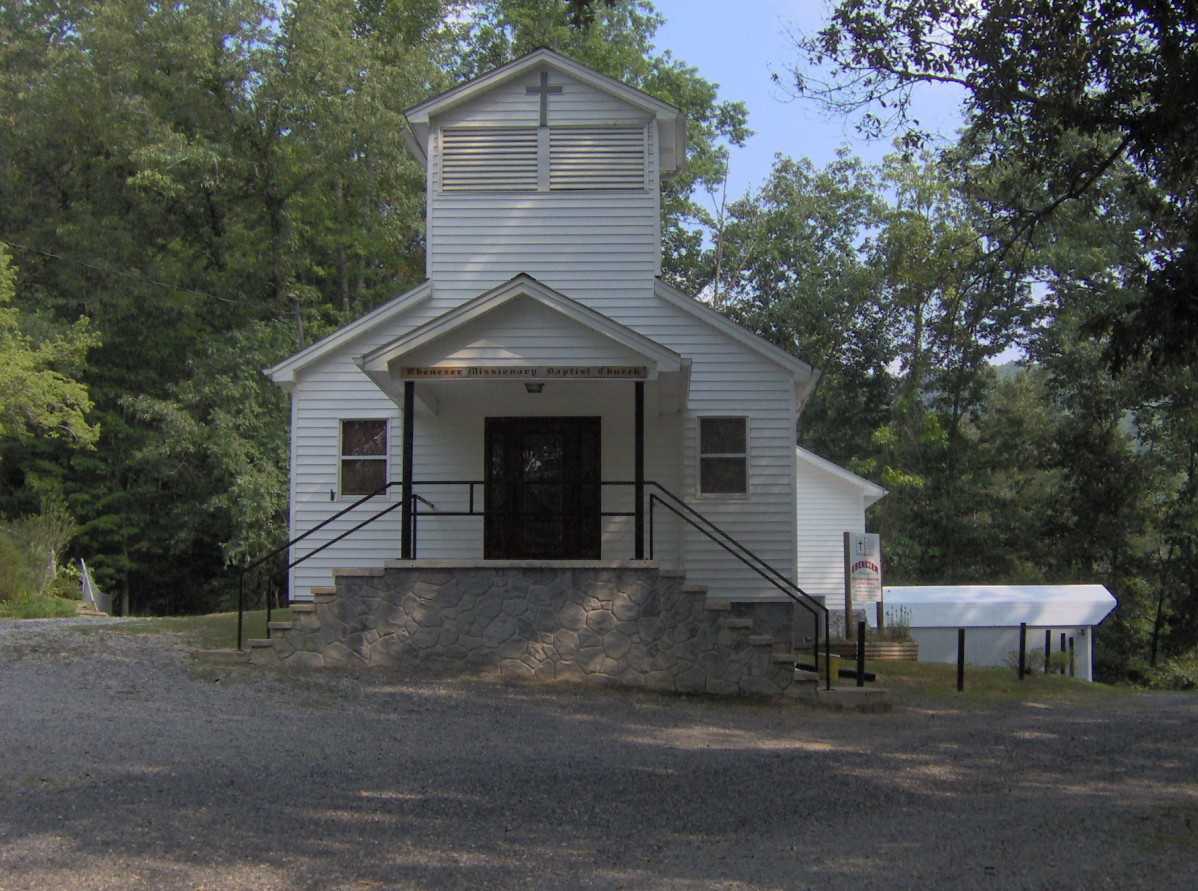
Ebenezer Missionary Baptist Church in Chapel Hollow, near Del Rio

Singer and actress Grace Moore, Del Rio's most famous resident, was born in Nough in 1898. Moore was the great-great-granddaughter of Jehu Stokely, one of Del Rio's original settlers. She was probably born in the home of her maternal grandparents, William and Emma Stokely, which sat on the west bank of Big Creek near the entrance to Nough. A Tennessee Historical Commission marker now recalls the site on SR 107, although the house no longer stands.

James R. Stokely and John Stokely— also great-great-grandchildren of Jehu— formed the Stokely Brothers Company, based in nearby Newport. The company would later be known nationally as Stokely-Van Camp's, and is now a subsidiary of ConAgra.

In 1911, the Weeks Act put an end to the massive logging operations in Southern Appalachia, and Del Rio began to decline. The Great Smoky Mountains National Park didn't extend to cover Snowbird or Max Patch, so Del Rio missed out on the tourism boom that made towns such as Gatlinburg wealthy. Mary Bell Smith, who taught at an elementary school near Nough in the 1930s, recalled elements of the poverty she witnessed during this period:

Many students in large families brought their lunches in tin pails which had been emptied of the pure pork lard which was originally bought in them. These lunch pails contained either blackberry pie or dried beans and cornbread. Sharing equally, sisters and brothers dipped harmoniously from the same lunch bucket.

Another economic blow for Del Rio came with the Interstate Highway Act. For decades, US 25/70 had been the main highway between Knoxville and Asheville, passing through Del Rio just before it ascended (or emerged from) the mountains. The new Interstate 40, however, ascended the mountains at Hartford, Tennessee to the south, rather than at Del Rio. Thus, the town's thru-traffic slowly died out.

=== Problems with moonshining and cockfighting ===
Like its neighbor Cosby, which is just over Stone Mountain to the west, Del Rio gained a reputation for moonshining during the first half of the 20th century. Moonshining wasn't uncommon in Appalachian communities, where poor soil and low corn prices drove farmers to illegally distill liquor to supplement their income. Long-time Del Rio resident Nathan Jones stated that while moonshining occurred it was typically low-scale and mostly for personal use.

While Del Rio's moonshining image may be exaggerated, Jones did acknowledge that cockfighting was common in the community as early as the 1950s. Twice in the 1980s, federal agents raided an operation just off Happy Hollow Road known as the Del Rio Cockfighting Pit. On June 11, 2005, the pit was again raided by federal agents, resulting 143 arrests and a seizure of more than $40,000 in cash. Federal officials described the pit as the "largest and oldest illegal cockfighting pit" in the United States.

== Education ==
Cocke County Schools's Del Rio Elementary School is located in Del Rio. It serves grades K–8.

High school students attend Cocke County High School in Newport.
