= Martha Sundquist State Forest =

State Forest in Cocke County, Tennessee

Coordinates: 35.80°N 83.02°W

Martha Sundquist State Forest is a Tennessee state forest located in Cocke County near Hartford. The forest was named in honor of former Tennessee governor Don Sundquist's wife, Martha. The forest consists primarily of mature mountain and cove hardwood stands, and is surrounded on three sides by the federally-managed Cherokee National Forest.

Martha Sundquist died on March 11, 2026, at the age of 88.

== History ==
The forest was created in 2001 when the state purchased 2,001 acres (810 ha) from the International Paper Company (formerly Champion International).

== Features ==
The forest features a hiking trail called "Tennessee Gulf Trail".

Tree types found in the forest include eastern hemlock, magnolia, maple, birch, and white pine.
