= West Greene High School (Tennessee) =

Location
- 275 West Greene Drive; Mosheim, Tennessee; United States; 36.18482°N 82.97316°W

Information
- Type: Public high school
- Motto: Achieving Excellence Together
- Established: 1966
- Principal: Dennis Wilds
- Teaching staff: 38.49 (FTE)
- Grades: 9-12
- Enrollment: 516 (2022-2023)
- Student to teacher ratio: 13.41
- Campus: Rural
- Color
- Team name: Buffaloes
- Website: wghs.greenek12.org

West Greene High School is a high school in Greene County located at 275 West Greene Drive in Mosheim, Tennessee. It is operated by the Greene County School system.

== History ==
It consolidates Mosheim, McDonald, Glenwood, and Warrensburg schools. Warrensburg is no longer open. Mosheim High School was closed when WGHS opened in 1966. Mosheim High School occupied a larger campus than WGHS but served grades 1-12 with an enrollment of around 1000 students. In 1966, Mosheim High became Mosheim Elementary and continues to serve grades K-8. In 1973, the large "Old Mosheim High School" building was demolished to make way for a smaller, open-classroom elementary school.

== Feeder schools ==
- Glenwood School (closed in 2019)
- Mosheim Elementary
- West Greene Middle (formerly Mosheim Middle)
- McDonald Elementary

== Athletics ==
Students may participate in a variety of athletic programs:

- Baseball
- Basketball - Boys and Girls
- Cross Country - Boys and Girls
- Football
- Golf - Boys and Girls
- Softball
- Tennis - Boys and Girls
- Volleyball
- Wrestling - Boys and Girls
- Band
- Track and Field
- Soccer - Boys and Girls
