= Midway, Greene County, Tennessee =

Midway
- Unincorporated community
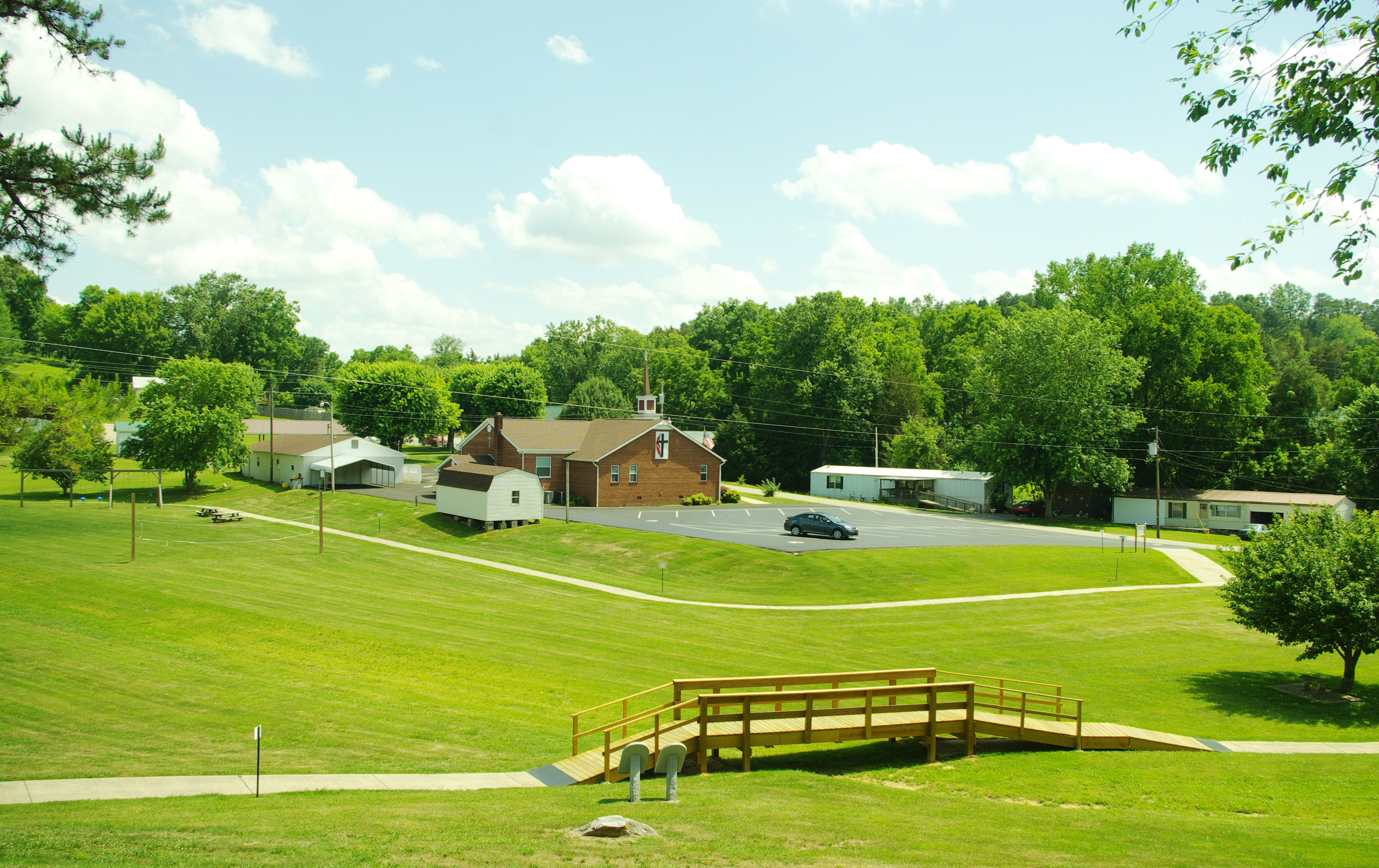

- Location within Tennessee Location within the United States
- Coordinates: 36°10′36″N 82°59′49″W
- Country: United States
- State: Tennessee
- County: Greene
- Elevation: 1,250 ft (380 m)
- Time zone: UTC-5 (Eastern (EST))
  - Summer (DST): UTC-4 (EDT)
- Zip code: 37809
- Area code: 423
- GNIS feature ID: 1293729

Midway is an unincorporated community in Greene County, Tennessee. Midway is located on Tennessee State Route 348 2.3 miles (3.7 km) west-southwest of Mosheim.

Minco Fused Silica Solutions for the World was headquartered in Midway until 3M purchased the plant in 2015.

The town of Mosheim has annexed some portions of Midway.

== Recreation ==
Midway United Methodist Church maintains a community park.

== Postal service ==
Midway currently has a shared post office with the town of Mosheim. The post office is located at 9280 West Andrew Johnson Highway, Mosheim, Tennessee, 37818. Midway has its own zip code (37809).
