= Cherokee Hills, Tennessee =

Cherokee Hills
- Unincorporated community
- Location within the state of Tennessee Cherokee Hills (the United States)
- Coordinates: 35°51′45″N 83°30′50″W
- Country: United States
- State: Tennessee
- County: Sevier
- Elevation: 994 ft (303 m)
- Time zone: UTC-5 (Eastern (EST))
  - Summer (DST): UTC-4 (EDT)
- GNIS feature ID: 1280321

Cherokee Hills is an unincorporated community in Sevier County, Tennessee, United States. It is accessible via U.S. Route 411, near extreme eastern Sevierville.

== Geography ==
Cherokee Hills has a mean elevation of 994 feet (303 metres).
