= Cocke County High School =

Public school in Tennessee, United States

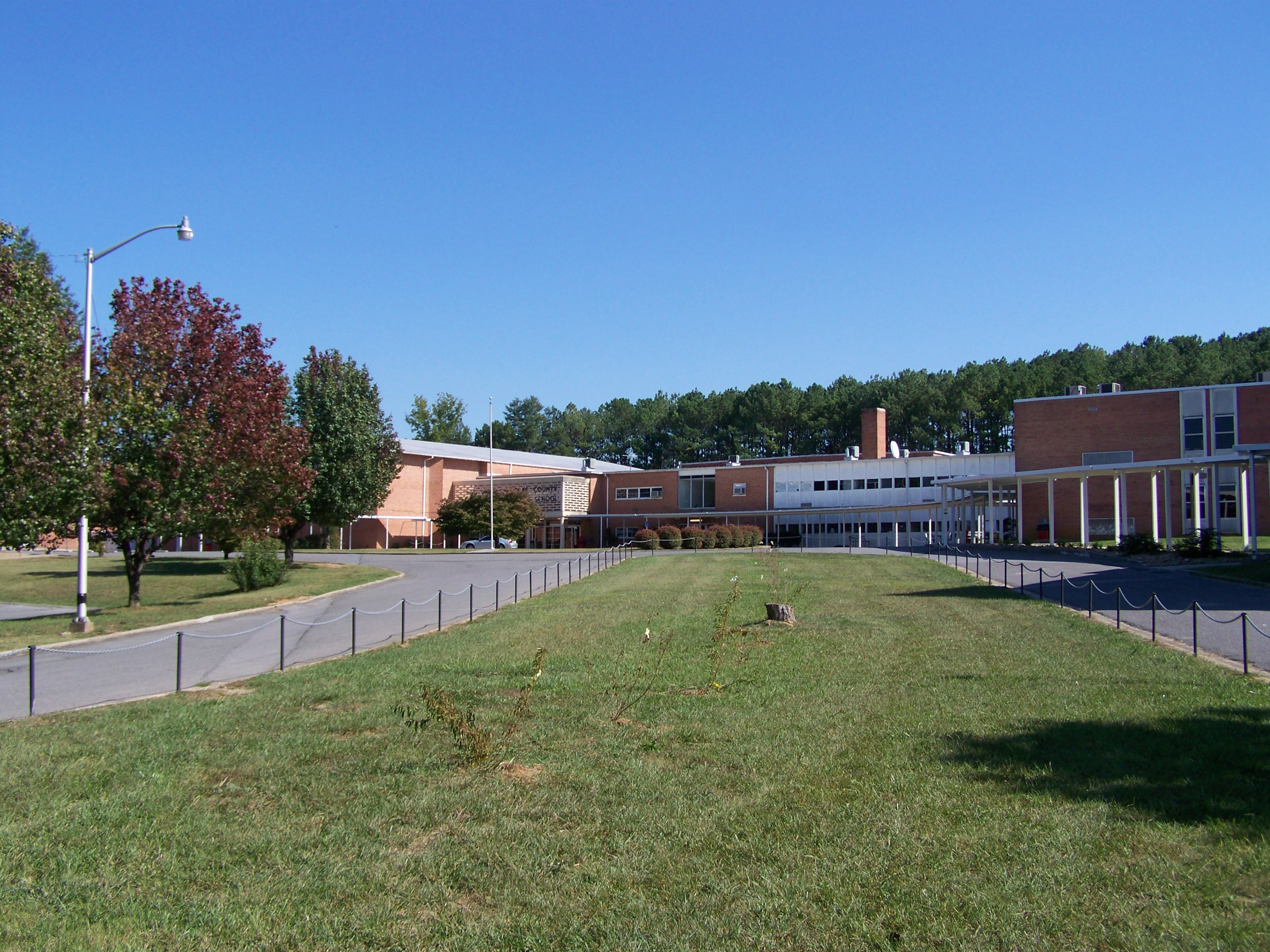

Location
- 216 Hedrick Drive; Newport, Tennessee; United States; 35°57′46″N 83°11′47″W

Information
- Type: Public
- Established: 1917
- School district: Cocke County School System
- Principal: A.C. Willis
- Teaching staff: 62.33 (on FTE basis)
- Grades: 9 to 12
- Enrollment: 1,140 (2023-2024)
- Student to teacher ratio: 18.29
- Color
- Sports: Football, Basketball, Baseball, Volleyball, Wrestling, Cross-Country, Track, Soccer, Marching Band, Cheerleading
- Team name: Fighting Cocks
- Website: CCHS website

Cocke County High School is a public high school located in Newport, Tennessee. The school serves around 1,100 students in a predominantly rural area of East Tennessee. It serves all of Cocke County except the southern portion, which is served by Cosby High School.

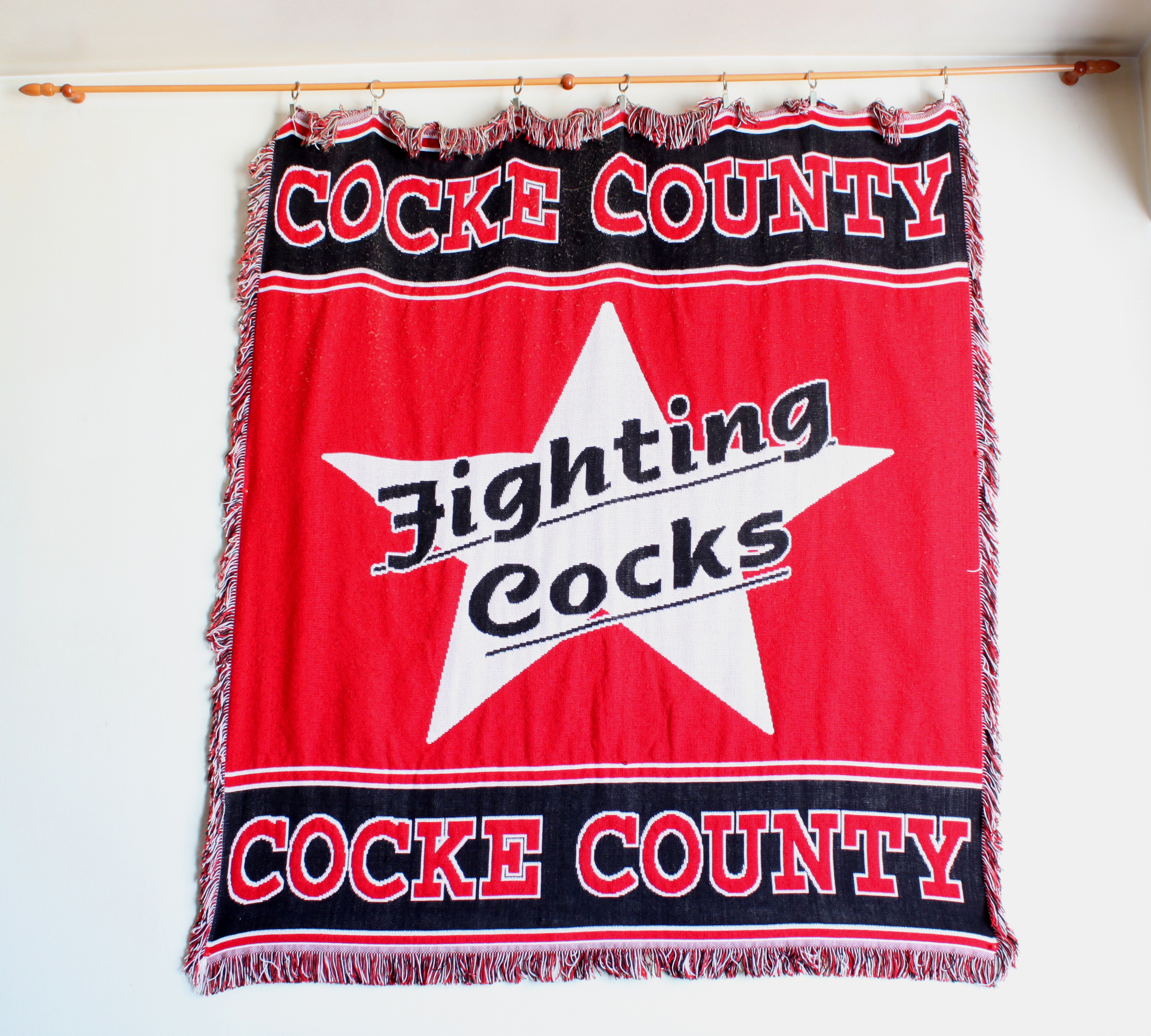
CCHS Fighting Cocks wall hanging

== Feeder Schools ==
- Newport Grammar
- Bridgeport Elementary
- Northwest Elementary
- Centerview Elementary
- Parrottsville Elementary
- Del Rio Elementary
- Edgemont Elementary
