= Mosheim, Tennessee =

Mosheim
- Town
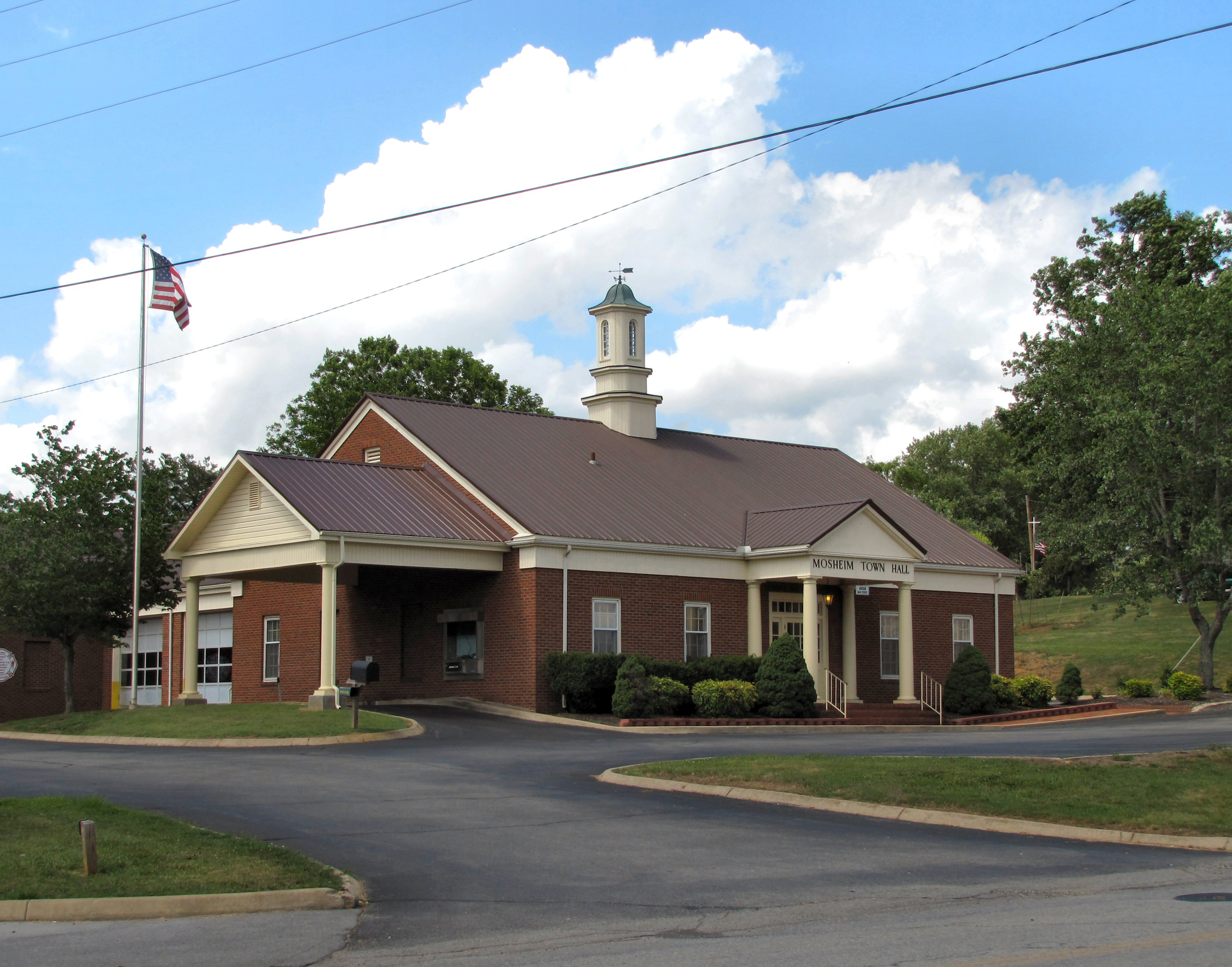
- Mosheim Town Hall

- Location of Mosheim in Greene County, Tennessee.
- Coordinates: 36°11′44″N 82°57′57″W
- Country: United States
- State: Tennessee
- County: Greene
- Settled: ca. 1800
- Incorporated: 1974
- Named after: Johann Lorenz von Mosheim

Government
  - Mayor: David Myers
  - Aldermen: List of Aldermen: Audrey Fincher; Dave Long; David Myers; Harold Smith (also vice mayor)

Area
  - Total: 6.27 sq mi (16.24 km^{2})
  - Land: 6.27 sq mi (16.24 km^{2})
  - Water: 0 sq mi (0.00 km^{2})
- Elevation: 1,378 ft (420 m)

Population (2020)
  - Total: 2,479
  - Density: 395.4/sq mi (152.65/km^{2})
- Time zone: UTC-5 (Eastern (EST))
  - Summer (DST): UTC-4 (EDT)
- ZIP code: 37711, 37743 and 37818
- Area code: 423
- FIPS code: 47-50320
- GNIS feature ID: 2406200
- Website: https://www.mosheim.net/

Mosheim (pronounced Moss-hime) is a town in Greene County, Tennessee, United States. The population was 2,479 at the 2020 census.

== History ==
Mosheim (also pronounced "MOSS-eyem" without the "h" sound) originally called "Blue Springs" after a spring that flows through the town, was settled circa 1800. Many of its initial settlers were German Lutherans. In 1872, the Lutherans established a local college at Blue Springs known as Mosheim Institute, after the German theologian, Johann Lorenz von Mosheim (1693–1755). That same year, the name of the town was officially changed to "Mosheim", after the college.

The Civil War Battle of Blue Springs was fought near Mosheim on October 10, 1863. The town of Mosheim held reenactments of this battle every year from 1991 until 2008, but ceased performing the reenactment due to financial obligations. Several participants of the East Tennessee bridge-burning conspiracy, including noted potter Alex Haun, hailed from a community known as "Pottertown," which was located just outside Mosheim.

The original Mosheim Volunteer Fire Department station 2700 is the oldest fire department in Greene County being chartered in 1961. In 1998, the Mosheim Volunteer Fire Department station 2700 split into two separate departments. With this major split happening the birth of the Town of Mosheim Fire Department station 1100 was on the rise. The new department has a total of five fire apparatuses which are used to serve and protect inside the city limits of the Town Of Mosheim.

== Geography ==
Mosheim is situated along the base and southern slopes of Big Ridge, an elongate ridge that runs roughly parallel to U.S. Route 11E. This area lies within the headwaters of Mosheim Branch, a tributary of Little Chucky Creek. U.S. Route 11E, known locally as Andrew Johnson Highway, connects Mosheim with Interstate 81 and Bulls Gap to the northwest, and Greeneville to the southeast. Tennessee State Route 348 connects Mosheim with Midway and the rural parts of western Greene County.

According to the United States Census Bureau, the town has a total area of 6.1 square miles (15.9 km^{2}), all land.

== Demographics ==
Historical population
Census	Pop.	Note	%±
1980	1,539		—
1990	1,451		−5.7%
2000	1,749		20.5%
2010	2,362		35.0%
2020	2,479		5.0%

=== 2020 census ===
Mosheim racial composition
Race	Number	Percentage
White (non-Hispanic)	2,252	90.84%
Black or African American (non-Hispanic)	28	1.13%
Native American	7	0.28%
Asian	7	0.28%
Pacific Islander	1	0.04%
Other/Mixed	108	4.36%
Hispanic or Latino	76	3.07%

As of the 2020 United States census, there were 2,479 people, 949 households, and 607 families residing in the town.

=== 2000 census ===
As of the census of 2000, there were 1,749 people, 742 households, and 532 families residing in the town. The population density was 413.0 inhabitants per square mile (159.5/km^{2}). There were 805 housing units at an average density of 190.1 per square mile (73.4/km^{2}). The racial makeup of the town was 98.80% White, 0.46% African American, 0.11% Asian, and 0.63% from two or more races. Hispanic or Latino of any race were 0.11% of the population.

There were 742 households, out of which 28.8% had children under the age of 18 living with them, 57.8% were married couples living together, 10.1% had a female householder with no husband present, and 28.3% were non-families. 25.1% of all households were made up of individuals, and 10.0% had someone living alone who was 65 years of age or older. The average household size was 2.36 and the average family size was 2.78.

In the town, the population was spread out, with 20.8% under the age of 18, 6.9% from 18 to 24, 28.8% from 25 to 44, 28.3% from 45 to 64, and 15.2% who were 65 years of age or older. The median age was 41 years. For every 100 females, there were 92.8 males. For every 100 females age 18 and over, there were 90.2 males.

The median income for a household in the town was $29,194, and the median income for a family was $36,118. Males had a median income of $26,211 versus $19,479 for females. The per capita income for the town was $16,243. About 5.7% of families and 8.8% of the population were below the poverty line, including 6.5% of those under age 18 and 19.0% of those age 65 or over.

== Postal service ==
Mosheim shares a post office with nearby community, Midway. The post office is located at 9280 West Andrew Johnson Highway in the Mosheim town limits at the corner of Main Street and US Route 11E.

Mosheim's zip code is 37818, although portions of the town limits are located in zip codes 37711 (areas around I-81, exit 23), 37743 (Eastern portions of the town), and Midway's zip code 37809.

== Utilities ==
Water and sewage in Mosheim is provided by the Town of Mosheim Water Department and Old Knoxville Highway Utility District. Electricity is provided by Greeneville Light and Power System (GLPS).

== Economy ==
Several factories are located in and near Mosheim, including a Walmart distribution center, Brenntag Mid-South. Minco Fused Silica Solutions of the World was located in nearby Midway, until 3M purchased the plant and now operates as 3M. Mosheim has one grocery store, Food Country USA. Several restaurants, gas stations and hotels are located at the Mosheim exit of Interstate 81, Exit 23.

Since 1986, Mosheim has hosted an annual festival in early June known as "Mosheim FunDays." The festival includes pageants, food and crafts booths, music, games, and a car show.

Volunteer Speedway is located in the western portion of the town at Interstate 81, exit 23.

== Education ==
There are three public schools in Mosheim, operated by Greene County Schools, which covers Mosheim:

- Mosheim Elementary - (grades PreK–5)
- Mosheim Middle - (formerly)
- West Greene Middle - (grades 6–8)
- West Greene High - (grades 9–12)

Western portions of Mosheim city limits are zoned to McDonald Elementary School in nearby Mohawk.

== Recreation ==
Public Parks in Mosheim:

- Mosheim Town Park
- Anna Sue Ward Park
