= Warrensburg, Tennessee =

Unincorporated community in Tennessee, US

Coordinates: 36°07′38″N 83°05′40″W

Warrensburg is an unincorporated community in western Greene County, Tennessee. Warrensburg is located on Tennessee State Route 340.

== Historic Bible Covered Bridge ==
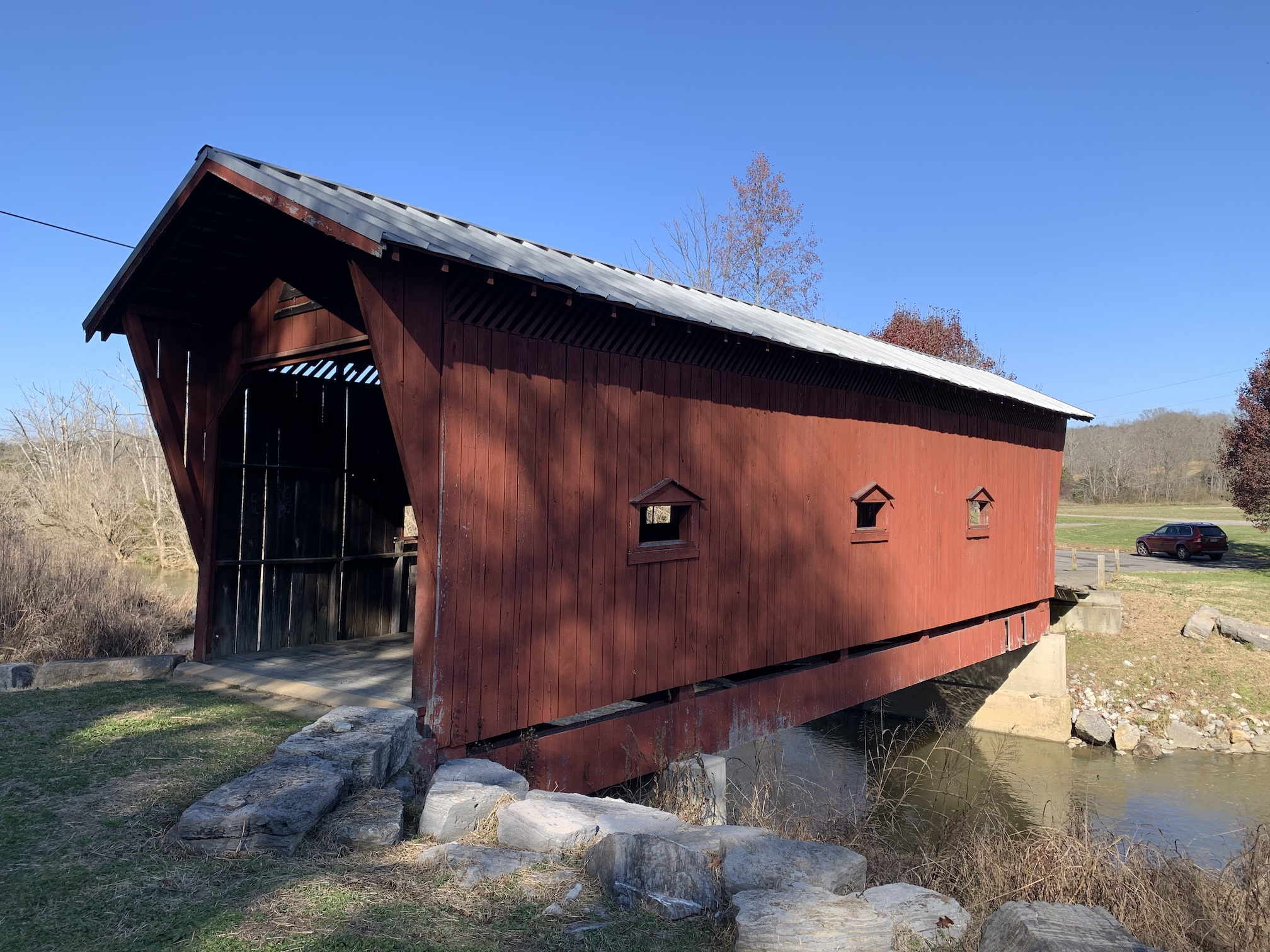

Bible Covered Bridge is located in Warrensburg. It was built in 1923 (102 years ago) as a private bridge for the Bible Family. The Greene County Heritage Trust took control of the bridge around 1972 and rehabilitated the Bridge, in 1987–1988 the Tennessee Department of Transportation, Greene County and The Federal Highway Administration built a new bridge adjacent to the covered bridge, The project also added rip-rat to the covered bridge and built a pull-off/parking area to provide access to the bridge. The state added offset railings to keep vehicular traffic away from the bridge and to further allow pedestrians to use the bridge. It is maintained as a State Historic Site.
