= Newport, Tennessee =

City and county seat of Cocke County, Tennessee, United States

- City
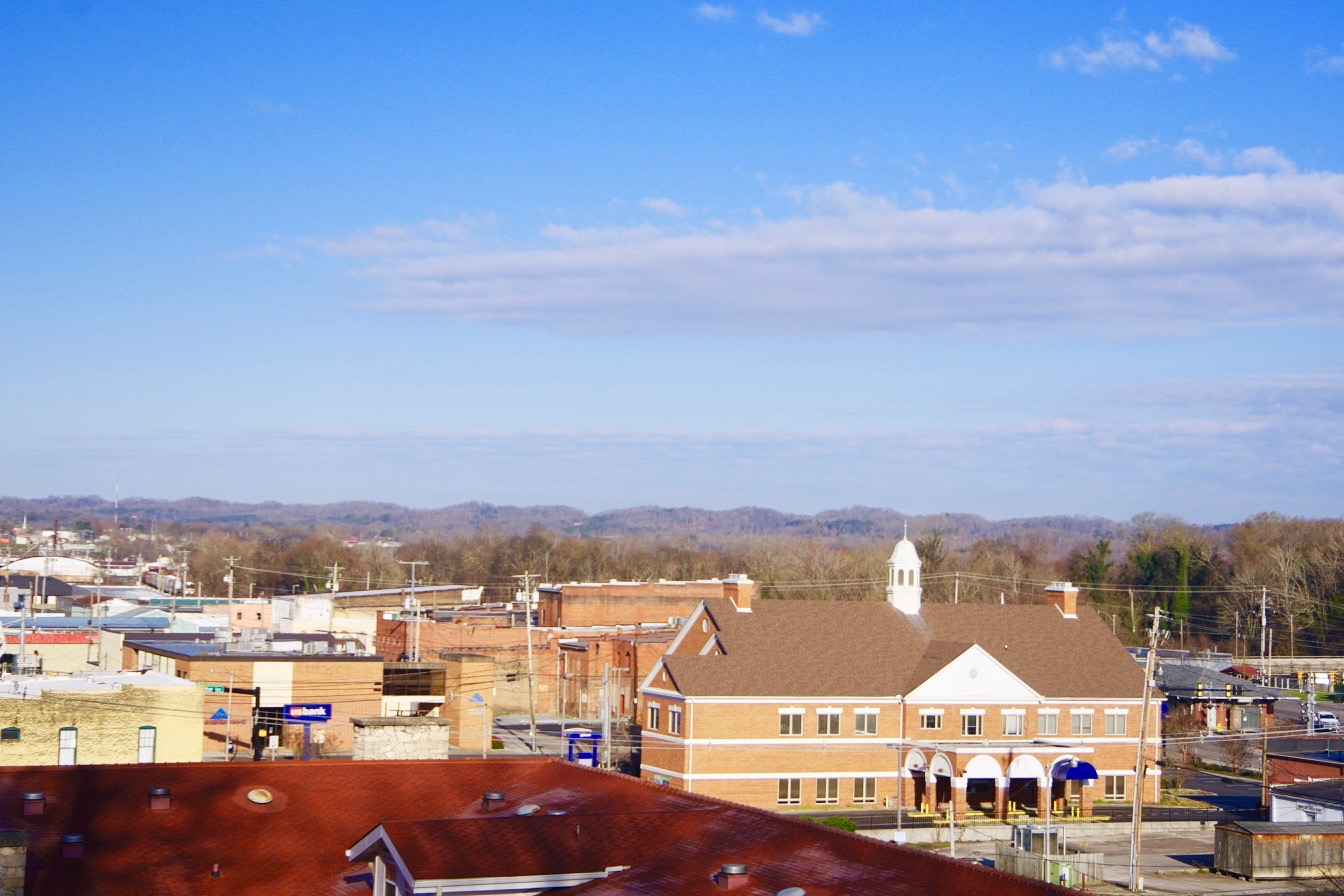
- Downtown Newport

- Seal

- Location of Newport in Cocke County, Tennessee.
- Coordinates: 35°57′42″N 83°11′51″W
- Country: United States
- State: Tennessee
- County: Cocke
- Founded: 1799
- Incorporated: 1867

Government v
  - Type: Mayor-council
  - Mayor: Roland Dykes III
  - Vice Mayor: Mike Proffitt
  - City Council: List of Councilmembers: Mike Proffitt (also Vice Mayor); Mike Hansel; Bobby Knight; Louanna Ottinger; Steve Smith

Area
  - City: 5.53 sq mi (14.33 km^{2})
  - Land: 5.53 sq mi (14.33 km^{2})
  - Water: 0 sq mi (0.00 km^{2})
- Elevation: 1,168 ft (356 m)

Population (2020)
  - City: 6,868
  - Density: 1,241.3/sq mi (479.25/km^{2})
  - Urban: 11,293
- Time zone: UTC-5 (Eastern (EST))
  - Summer (DST): UTC-4 (EDT)
- ZIP codes: 37821-37822
- Area code: 423
- FIPS code: 47-53000
- GNIS feature ID: 2404374
- Website: www.cityofnewport-tn.com

Newport is a city in and the county seat of Cocke County, Tennessee, United States. As of the 2020 census, Newport had a population of 6,868. Newport is located along the Pigeon River.

== History ==
=== Early settlement ===
The Great Indian Warpath passed through what is now Newport en route to the ancient Cherokee hunting grounds of northeastern Tennessee. The Warpath crossed the Pigeon River at a point approximately 0.2 miles (0.3 km) east of the McSween Memorial Bridge (US-321), in an area where the river is normally low enough to walk across. The first European traders to the area, arriving in the mid-18th century, called this point along the Pigeon River the "War Ford".

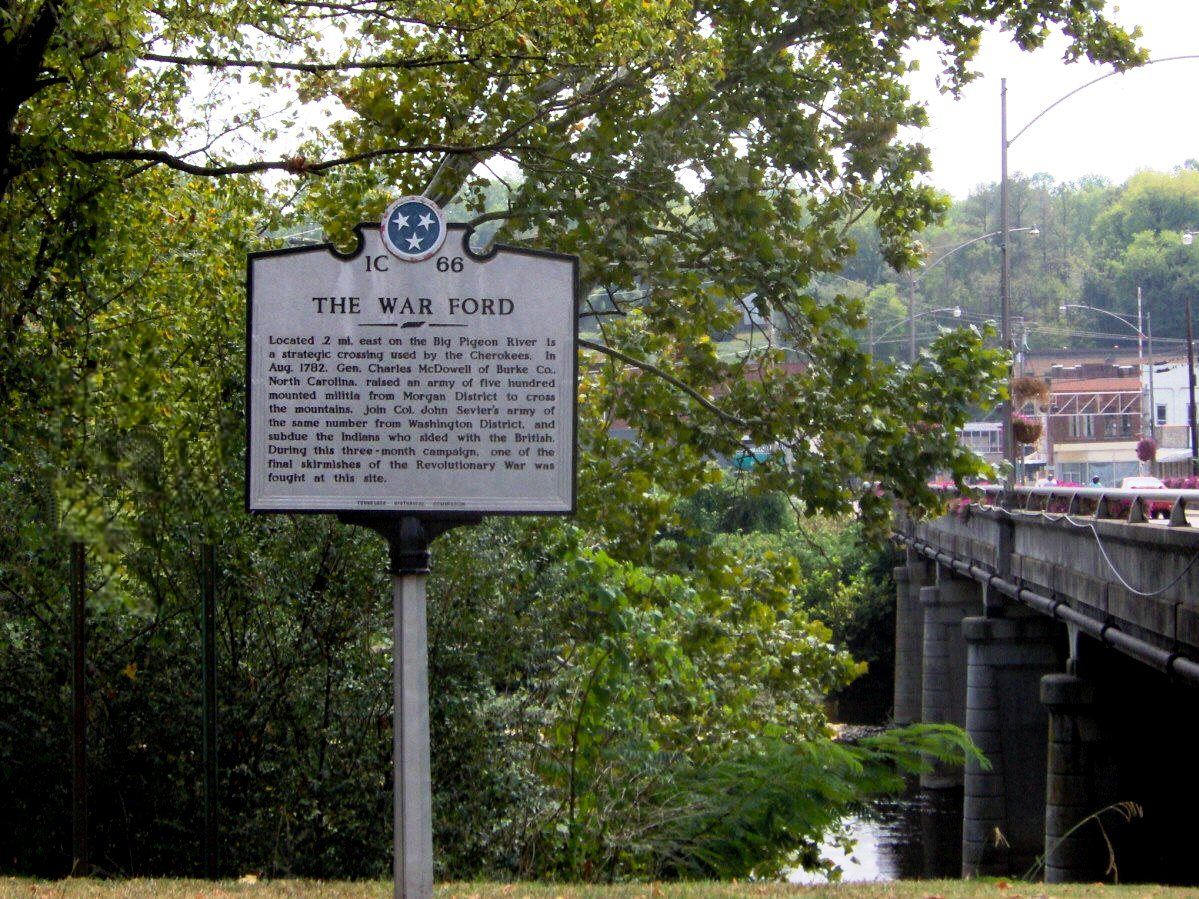
Historical marker along US-321 in Newport, recalling the site of War Ford

During the American Revolution, the Cherokee aligned themselves with the British, and launched sporadic attacks against early Euro-American settlers in the Holston valley. In the waning months of the conflict in 1782, a detachment led by Gen. Charles McDowell of North Carolina crossed the mountains into what is now Tennessee to join up with Col. John Sevier's local forces and initiate an aggressive campaign against the hostile Cherokee. In August of that year, Sevier crossed the Pigeon at War Ford, attacking and killing several Cherokee camped along the river's banks. This assault was one of the final engagements of the Revolution.

At the close of the Revolution, the first Euro-American settlers arrived in the Newport area, ensconcing themselves in the vicinity of the strategic river fords. Peter Fine established a ferry on the north bank of the French Broad in the early 1780s, and in 1783 John Gilliland settled opposite Fine's Ferry in what is now Oldtown. Shortly thereafter, Emanuel Sandusky, a Polish immigrant, established a farm on the land where the Cocke County Memorial Building now stands, and Samuel O'Dell settled at the junction of the Pigeon River and Cosby Creek. Sometime in the 1790s, the Gilliland family donated 50 acres (200,000 m^{2}) of land for a town square and courthouse to be situated opposite Fine's Ferry on the banks of the French Broad, and the town of New Port was born.

For nearly a quarter-century, the residents of the Newport area lived under constant threat of attack from Cherokee crossing the mountains from North Carolina. Shortly after the arrival of the first Euro-American settlers, Peter Fine sought to quell this threat by leading a punitive expedition against the Cherokee town of Cowee in North Carolina, which Fine captured and burned. The Cherokee responded by stealing Fine's livestock and attempting to herd them back to North Carolina. Fine gave chase and managed to retrieve the livestock, but on the return march he was ambushed and his brother, Vinet, was killed. The Cherokee were in pursuit, and Vinet's body was hidden in a hole in a frozen creek for later retrieval. The creek melted and the body was lost. The creek was named Fines Creek. Shortly thereafter, two O'Dells were killed, one of Sandusky's daughters was kidnapped, and several others settlers were killed or scalped.

To provide defense against these sporadic attacks, the early settlers erected a series of forts in the area. Wood's Fort guarded the Forks-of-the-River just downstream from Newport, and McCoy's Fort and Whitson's Fort defended the area to the south. Other installations included Huff's Fort at what is now Del Rio. With Sevier's victory at the Battle of Boyds Creek and the ensuing Treaty of Dumplin in 1785, Cherokee influence in the area began to wane. In the 1790s, the Cherokee signed a series of treaties which essentially ceded most of the land on the Tennessee side of the Great Smokies to the U.S. government. By 1800, Cherokee attacks in the Newport area had been drastically reduced.

=== Flatboat period ===
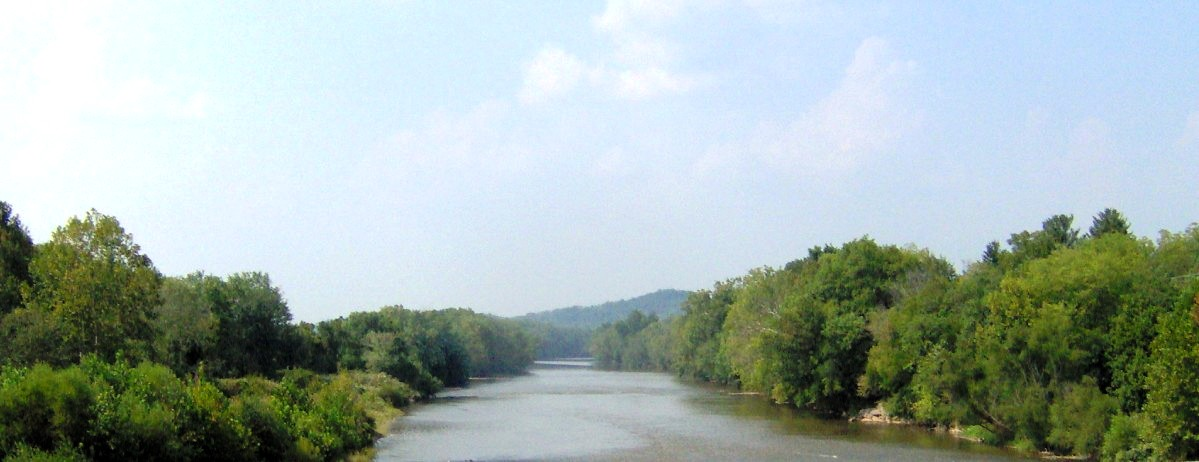
The French Broad River in the vicinity of Fine's Ferry at Newport's northern border

The French Broad River passes 1 mile (1.6 km) north of the current city limits. As the French Broad empties into the Tennessee River, towns along its banks are connected via waterway to New Orleans and the Gulf of Mexico. In the early 19th century, William Faubion, who lived just northeast of New Port, managed to reach New Orleans with a flatboat shipment and return safely. In early 19th-century East Tennessee, which was riddled with poor roads and hilly terrain, river travel was a relatively convenient mode of transportation. "New Port", situated on the French Broad near Forks-of-the-River, quickly developed into a flatboat trading hub.

William Garrett (1774–1853) arrived in New Port in the late 1790s and built a plantation, known as Beechwood Hall, just south of Fine's Ferry. Many early travelers, including several circuit riders and religious leaders, were entertained at Garrett's mansion. During the War of 1812, Garrett shipped eight large flatboats stocked with food and whiskey to the U.S. Navy in New Orleans.

Among those entertained at Beechwood Hall in the early 19th century was Bishop Francis Asbury, a circuit rider credited with spreading Methodism to the Southern Appalachian region. Asbury wrote in his journal:

We rode through New-Port, the capital of Cocke County, forded French Broad at Shine's Ferry, and came cold and without food for man or beast to John O'Haver's but oh, the kindness of our open-hearted friends.

In 1812, a large Methodist revival was held at New Port's crude log courthouse, and the Zion Methodist Church was established that same year. The Presbyterians erected a church on Graveyard Hill (above the modern junction of US-321 and US-70) in the 1820s. The residents of New Port established one of the first schools in the area, Anderson Academy, in 1820. New Port was officially incorporated on October 19, 1812.

While New Port had strong religious beginnings, its situation as a river trading hub on the edge of the Appalachian frontier inevitably led to a certain lawlessness. Saloons were a mainstay in the town throughout the 19th century. Henry Ker, a traveler who visited New Port in 1816, recalled:

I set out for Newport, a small town on the French Broad River. At sunset I arrived, having much difficulty in finding the town for it was hid in a deep valley. It is the most licentious place in the State of Tennessee, containing about twenty houses of sloth, indolence and dissipation.

New Port's residents countered this lawlessness with swift methods of justice. The town had a pillory, stocks, and a ducking chair. Hangings were not uncommon.

=== Civil War ===
By 1834, Newport had a population of 150. The town included two general stores, two doctors, three blacksmiths, two tailors, two hatters, a wagon maker, two churches, and two taverns. A new brick courthouse had been erected in 1828 to replace the crude log courthouse.

While slavery was not as common in East Tennessee as in other parts of the Southern United States, it did occur. Some buildings in early Cocke County were built with slave labor. Sometime before the Civil War, local records report the executions of at least two slaves. One was a grandmother whose grandson drowned while she fled across the Pigeon River in an attempt to keep him from being sold. The other, a slave by the name of "Tom", was tortured and burned alive for the murder of Mary Lotspeich. In the years leading up to the war, Newport's Methodists split into pro-slavery and anti-slavery denominations, reflecting a division common throughout the county.

When the Civil War broke out in the 1860s, New Port attempted to remain neutral. The town was a consistent target of raids from both Union and Confederate soldiers. The owners of Beechwood Hall buried their silver and kept their horses in the basement to prevent them from being stolen. The residents of Cocke County eventually recruited a home guard to protect them from raids, which they based at the mouth of Indian Camp Creek, a few miles south of New Port.

Several skirmishes occurred in the vicinity of New Port, namely along Lick Creek to the north and Cosby Creek to the south. At the latter, the brother of North Carolina Governor Zebulon Vance was captured in an ambush.

=== The railroad and the Clifton annexation controversy ===
In 1867, the Cincinnati, Cumberland Gap, and Charleston Railroad constructed a line through Clifton, which was located just south of New Port on the other side of the Pigeon River. As railroads were quickly replacing flatboats as the preferred mode of transportation and shipping in East Tennessee, the residents of New Port sought to build the new Cocke County Courthouse in Clifton. To bypass state law, which required an election to move a county seat, New Port decided to simply annex Clifton.

The residents of Clifton, however, made it clear that they didn't want to be annexed. When New Port ignored them and moved forward with the annexation anyway, the residents of Clifton sued. After a 17-year legal battle, the Tennessee State Supreme Court ruled that the annexation violated the state's constitution. The new courthouse was constructed in Clifton in 1884. Perhaps due to railroad interests at the time, Clifton was renamed "Newport". New Port became known as "Oldport" or "Oldtown". Thus the town of Newport "shifted" from its location on the flatboat-friendly French Broad to its current location along the railroad running parallel to the Pigeon.

=== Alexander Arthur and the logging boom ===
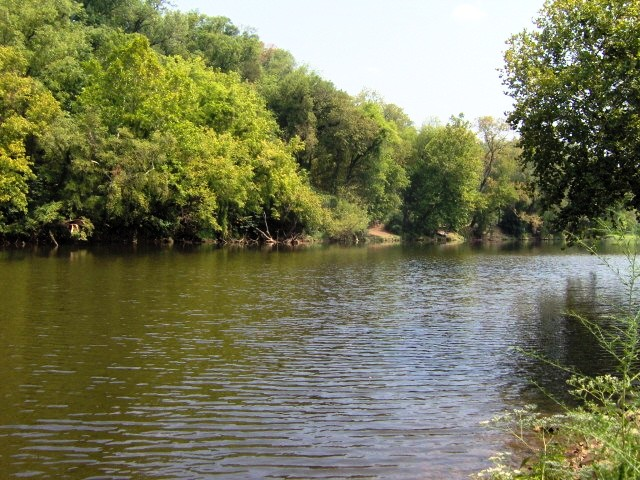
The Pigeon River in Newport

Innovations in the logging industry in the late 19th century led to a rapid deforestation of the Ohio Valley and Mississippi Delta. Logging companies eventually turned to the timber-rich forests of Southern Appalachia to keep up with the increasing demand for wood, and band saw mills began spring up in towns located along the base of the mountains.

In 1880, Canadian-born entrepreneur Alexander Arthur (1846–1912), representing the Scottish Carolina Timber and Land Company, arrived in Newport with ambitious plans to log the Pigeon valley. Arthur's plan called for the construction of a series of dams and booms which would be used to move logs from the higher elevations downstream using the river's current. The logs would eventually be floated all the way to Knoxville. The operation would be based in Newport, with a sawmill in the higher elevations at Pigeon Valley (now Hartford, Tennessee).

Over the next six years, Arthur and his team of engineers and lumberjacks—some from as far away as South Africa and Europe—cut and sawed thousands of logs which they stocked behind a large dam. Arthur built an extravagant house in Newport and even made proposals to modernize the town square.

The residents of Newport—who were nonplussed by the flashy and energetic Arthur—warned the entrepreneur about the Pigeon River's volatility. While the mountain streams of Southern Appalachia appear calm and serene on a typical day, torrential rains in the higher elevations can turn these streams into raging whitewater rapids. In the spring of 1886, the warnings of the locals became reality when a cloudburst hit the Balsam Mountains near the Pigeon's source and the river became a raging torrent. All day long, Arthur and his team fought ferociously to secure the dam holding back the company's precious stock of logs. That evening, one of Arthur's engineers returned to Newport briefly to rest. Before leaving again, he told the anxious wives of the company men and the curious Newportians that if they heard the whistle, all would be "gone to hell". Historian Wilma Dykeman described that night:

Just before daybreak at the depth of the dark and rain, the waiting women and all the rest of the wakefull town heard the great crash as the booms burst, and the cry of the whistle signaled the men's defeat. Logs from thousands of trees boiled over the broken dams, smashed together in a grinding roar and surged on down the current like giant toothpicks tossed by some elemental energy.

His venture now bankrupt, Alexander moved to Knoxville to start rebuilding his fortune. He would later be instrumental in the founding of Middlesboro, Kentucky. The residents of Newport converted Scottish Timber's now-abandoned commissary into a saloon.

=== 1900s ===
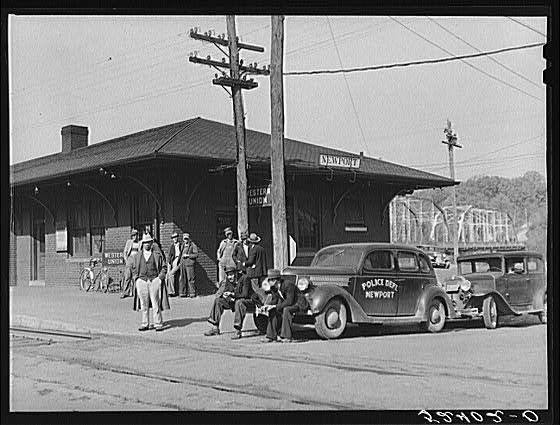
Newport Depot, photographed by Marion Post Wolcott in 1939

By the 1890s, the population of Newport had grown to 900. While Alexander Arthur's logging venture failed, industry continued to find its way to the town. In 1895, the A.C. Lawrence Leather Company established what eventually become one of the world's largest tanneries in Newport. Three years later, brothers James and John Stokely founded the Stokely Brothers Company (now Stokely-Van Camp's) to can vegetables they grew throughout the French Broad valley. Newport native Ben Hooper served as governor of Tennessee from 1911 to 1915.

Carson Springs, 6 miles (10 km) southwest of Newport, developed around William Wilson's tavern and stagecoach terminal in the early 19th century. Later in the century, C.P. Peterson and wife built and operated the Peterson Hotel. As the mineral-rich mountain springs of Appalachia were thought to have health-restoring qualities, Carson Springs developed into an early tourist resort. The establishment of the Great Smoky Mountains National Park in 1934 brought a still greater influx of tourists to Newport, but nothing like the tourism explosion that occurred in neighboring Sevier County.

Kiffin Yates Rockwell, who was born in Newport in 1892, joined the French Foreign Legion during World War I. After being wounded, Rockwell joined one of the Legion's aviation corps, known as the Lafayette Escadrille, and would become the first American pilot to shoot down an enemy plane in combat.

=== Moonshining and crime ===
Appalachia is characterized by winding narrow coves and hidden hollows separated by high ridges. Many of these hollows contained just enough bottomland to support an economy based on subsistence agriculture, but with each crop, the soil grew poorer and poorer. Thus, to make ends meet, farmers in communities such as Cosby and Del Rio began setting aside some of their corn crop for liquor production. These early distillers found an easy market in the taverns and saloons of Newport, itself located at a point where the Appalachian highlands meet the Tennessee Valley.

At the onset of Prohibition in 1920, the demand for illegally distilled liquor skyrocketed, and Cocke County was primed to meet it. Not only did the county have moonshiners with generations of experience, but the remote Appalachian hollows and thick forest provided perfect hiding places for illegal stills. And as young men left the farms of rural Tennessee to seek employment in the textile mills of Knoxville and the large manufacturing hubs of the Midwest in the early 20th century, networks for moving the liquor from the mountain hollows to the large urban areas were already in place.

From the 1920s through the 1960s, Cocke County became notorious throughout the Southeast as a moonshine hot spot. To complicate matters, large numbers of servicemen passing through Newport en route to Knoxville or Asheville during World War II drew large numbers of prostitutes to the area. In 1969, the Knoxville News Sentinel published a series of reports regarding organized crime in the county, and Governor Buford Ellington launched an investigation that led to the arrest of Constable D.C. Ramsey, Cocke County Sheriff Tom O'Dell, and several state troopers stationed in within the county on charges of extortion and bribery. In the following decade, a new district attorney, Al Schmutzer, launched a crackdown on the various moonshining, gambling, and cockfighting rings within the county, with some success.

In spite of Schmutzer's efforts, Cocke County continued to struggle with organized crime. In 1982, 40,000 marijuana plants were found growing just off Asheville Highway. The following year, Cocke County Sheriff Bobby Stinson was indicted along with 43 others on cocaine conspiracy charges. In 1987, 30 people from Cocke and Sevier County were arrested on charges relating to a car theft ring. Corruption probes and federal indictments relating to Cocke County law enforcement continued into the 21st century. In the 1990s, a series of economic initiatives by Newport and Cocke County, however, helped to curb the crime rate substantially.

In 2008, production for the CMT reality television program Outsiders Inn took place at the Christopher Place Resort in Newport.

In 2009, the FBI indicted and successfully prosecuted a 23-person car theft and drug ring. Six persons entered guilty pleas by 2010, including a retired Newport police captain and his family. Eddie Hawk was sentenced to nine years. The investigation was branched from the FBI Rose Thorn case, which focused upon Cocke County Sheriff officers' corruption, resulting in an earlier 170 arrests on federal and state charges.

== Geography ==
Newport is located in western Cocke County and is situated along the Pigeon River in an area where the foothills of the Great Smoky Mountains descend into the French Broad drainage basins. English Mountain rises prominently to the southwest and Hall Top Mountain rises to the southeast, with the Pigeon River cutting a valley between the two. The Great Smoky Mountains National Park boundary passes some 15 miles (24 km) to the south.

The confluence of the French Broad, Nolichucky, and Pigeon rivers occurs 10 miles (16 km) northwest of Newport in an area once known as Forks-of-the-River. This area now comprises the northeastern section of Douglas Lake, which was created by an impoundment of the French Broad by the Tennessee Valley Authority in the 1940s. The French Broad eventually merges with the Holston River in Knoxville to form the Tennessee River, some 40 miles (64 km) to the west of Newport.

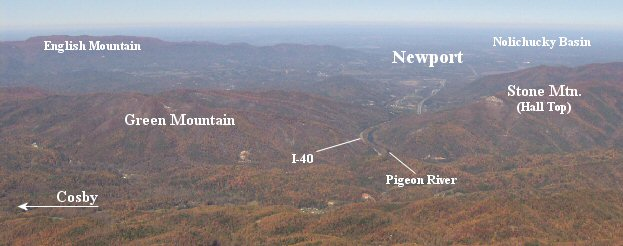
Cocke County, looking north from Mt. Cammerer

Several major federal highways intersect at Newport. Interstate 40 passes through the city's southern section about 18 miles (29 km) north of the North Carolina border. U.S. Route 321 runs perpendicular to I-40, approaching Newport from Cosby to the south. U.S. Route 411 merges with U.S. Route 70 in Carson Springs, and the merged road enters Newport from the west, intersecting US-321 in downtown Newport. US-70 continues east to Del Rio, Tennessee, and Hot Springs, North Carolina, while US-321 turns north and crosses the Pigeon and French Broad en route to Greeneville and northeastern Tennessee.

Newport consists of several sections relating to its historical development. The main section of town, centered around the courthouse, is situated along the south bank of the Pigeon amongst a series of relatively low but steep cliffs. North of the main section is "Oldtown", situated between the Pigeon and French Broad, which was the town's main area before the arrival of the railroad in the late 19th century. A more modern section of town has developed along US-321 between the courthouse area and I-40.

According to the United States Census Bureau, the city has a total area of 14.3 square kilometres (5.5 sq mi), all of it land.

=== Climate ===
Climate data for Newport 1 NW, Tennessee (1991–2020 normals, extremes 1893–present)
Month	Jan	Feb	Mar	Apr	May	Jun	Jul	Aug	Sep	Oct	Nov	Dec	Year
Record high °F (°C)	81 (27)	84 (29)	89 (32)	93 (34)	98 (37)	106 (41)	107 (42)	105 (41)	105 (41)	96 (36)	85 (29)	82 (28)	107 (42)
Mean daily maximum °F (°C)	49.2 (9.6)	53.7 (12.1)	62.0 (16.7)	71.8 (22.1)	79.0 (26.1)	85.2 (29.6)	88.1 (31.2)	87.6 (30.9)	82.7 (28.2)	72.5 (22.5)	61.1 (16.2)	52.1 (11.2)	70.4 (21.3)
Daily mean °F (°C)	38.6 (3.7)	42.4 (5.8)	49.5 (9.7)	58.5 (14.7)	66.9 (19.4)	74.2 (23.4)	77.6 (25.3)	76.7 (24.8)	70.9 (21.6)	59.6 (15.3)	48.3 (9.1)	41.4 (5.2)	58.7 (14.8)
Mean daily minimum °F (°C)	28.0 (−2.2)	31.1 (−0.5)	37.1 (2.8)	45.2 (7.3)	54.8 (12.7)	63.3 (17.4)	67.1 (19.5)	65.8 (18.8)	59.1 (15.1)	46.7 (8.2)	35.4 (1.9)	30.7 (−0.7)	47.0 (8.3)
Record low °F (°C)	−23 (−31)	−16 (−27)	−4 (−20)	14 (−10)	29 (−2)	36 (2)	47 (8)	46 (8)	32 (0)	20 (−7)	5 (−15)	−17 (−27)	−23 (−31)
Average precipitation inches (mm)	3.89 (99)	4.18 (106)	4.29 (109)	4.08 (104)	4.08 (104)	4.29 (109)	4.93 (125)	3.82 (97)	3.10 (79)	2.42 (61)	3.44 (87)	4.17 (106)	46.69 (1,186)
Average snowfall inches (cm)	1.8 (4.6)	0.8 (2.0)	0.2 (0.51)	0.0 (0.0)	0.0 (0.0)	0.0 (0.0)	0.0 (0.0)	0.0 (0.0)	0.0 (0.0)	0.0 (0.0)	0.0 (0.0)	0.5 (1.3)	3.3 (8.4)
Average precipitation days (≥ 0.01 in)	11.4	11.4	12.0	10.0	11.2	11.6	11.2	9.8	7.7	7.8	8.7	11.0	123.8
Average snowy days (≥ 0.1 in)	1.0	0.5	0.1	0.0	0.0	0.0	0.0	0.0	0.0	0.0	0.0	0.3	1.9
Source: NOAA

== Demographics ==
Historical population
Census	Pop.	Note	%±
1870	281		—
1880	347		23.5%
1890	658		89.6%
1900	1,630		147.7%
1910	2,003		22.9%
1920	2,753		37.4%
1930	2,989		8.6%
1940	3,575		19.6%
1950	3,892		8.9%
1960	6,448		65.7%
1970	7,328		13.6%
1980	7,580		3.4%
1990	7,123		−6.0%
2000	7,242		1.7%
2010	6,945		−4.1%
2020	6,868		−1.1%

=== 2020 census ===
Racial composition as of the 2020 census
Race	Number	Percent
White	6,068	88.4%
Black or African American	267	3.9%
American Indian and Alaska Native	30	0.4%
Asian	50	0.7%
Native Hawaiian and Other Pacific Islander	4	0.1%
Some other race	74	1.1%
Two or more races	375	5.5%
Hispanic or Latino (of any race)	221	3.2%

As of the 2020 census, Newport had a population of 6,868, 3,042 households, and 1,692 families, and a median age of 42.9 years; 22.0% of residents were under the age of 18 while 19.5% were 65 years of age or older. For every 100 females there were 85.7 males, and for every 100 females age 18 and over there were 80.9 males.

There were 3,042 households in Newport; 27.2% had children under the age of 18 living in them, 28.4% were married-couple households, 21.6% were households with a male householder and no spouse or partner present, and 41.7% were households with a female householder and no spouse or partner present. About 39.2% of all households were made up of individuals and 17.7% had someone living alone who was 65 years of age or older.

There were 3,437 housing units, of which 11.5% were vacant, with a homeowner vacancy rate of 2.8% and a rental vacancy rate of 6.5%.

96.4% of residents lived in urban areas, while 3.6% lived in rural areas.

=== 2000 census ===
As of the census of 2000, there was a population of 7,242, with 3,203 households and 1,941 families residing in the city. The population density was 1,337.8 inhabitants per square mile (516.5/km^{2}). There were 3,483 housing units at an average density of 643.4 per square mile (248.4/km^{2}). The racial makeup of the city was 92.07% White, 5.36% African American, 0.51% Native American, 0.23% Asian, 0.03% Pacific Islander, 0.46% from other races, and 1.34% from two or more races. Hispanic or Latino of any race were 1.31% of the population.

There were 3,203 households, out of which 27.1% had children under the age of 18 living with them, 37.7% were married couples living together, 18.8% had a female householder with no husband present, and 39.4% were non-families. 36.0% of all households were made up of individuals, and 15.6% had someone living alone who was 65 years of age or older. The average household size was 2.19 and the average family size was 2.82.

In the city, the population was spread out, with 22.7% under the age of 18, 9.0% from 18 to 24, 27.5% from 25 to 44, 23.8% from 45 to 64, and 17.1% who were 65 years of age or older. The median age was 38 years. For every 100 females, there were 84.8 males. For every 100 females age 18 and over, there were 80.6 males.

The median income for a household in the city was $20,539, and the median income for a family was $26,791. Males had a median income of $25,692 versus $20,165 for females. The per capita income for the city was $12,870. About 24.1% of families and 29.1% of the population were below the poverty line, including 40.8% of those under age 18 and 18.7% of those age 65 or over.

== Education ==
Schools located in Newport: The City of Newport manages Newport Grammar School.

Cocke County Board of Education manages Cocke County High School, Cosby High School, Cosby Elementary School, Northwest Elementary School, Smokey Mountain Elementary School, Parrottsville Elementary School, Del Rio Elementary School, Grassy Fork Elementary School, Bridgeport Elementary School and Edgemont Elementary School.

== Sports ==
Newport was home to the Newport Canners Minor League Baseball team that played in the Class D Appalachian League from 1937 to 1942 and the Mountain States League from 1948 to 1950.

== Historic structures in the Newport area ==
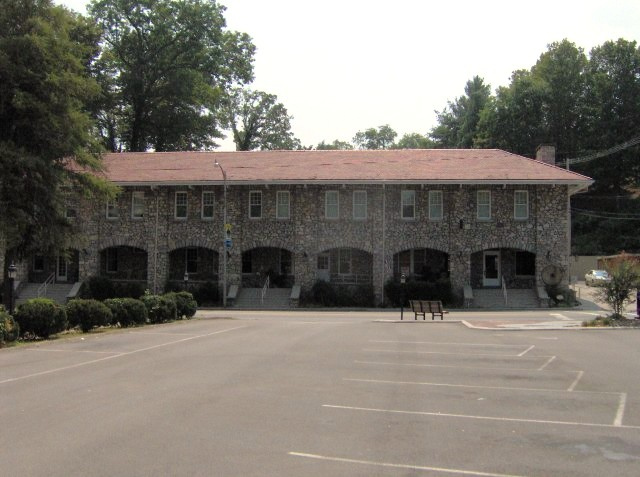
The Rhea-Mims Hotel

- Beechwood Hall, constructed in 1803 and placed on the National Register of Historic Places in 1975
- O'Dell House, constructed in 1814 and placed on the NRHP in 1975
- Cocke County Courthouse, constructed in 1930 and placed on the NRHP in 1995
- Elm Hill, constructed in the 1890s and placed on the NRHP in 1975
- Rhea-Mims Hotel, constructed in 1925 and placed on the NRHP in 1998. In 2000, the hotel was refurnished as a home for senior citizens by the firm Barge, Waggoner, Sumner, and Cannon, Inc.
- Cocke County Memorial Building, constructed in 1931 and placed on the NRHP in 1997
- Newport Lodge #234 F&AM Masonic Lodge constructed in 1875 by Charles Anthony Lovett of Greene County, Tennessee; served as town's first school, Newport Academy. Still stands on a hill overlooking the town on Mims Ave. and has been in continuous use as a Masonic Hall since 1898 until today.

== Notable people ==
- Jake Crum (born 1991), NASCAR driver
- DeWitt Sanford Dykes Sr. (1903–1991), architect, minister
- Wilma Dykeman (1920–2006), author and local historian
- Houston Fancher (born 1966), Charlotte 49ers men's basketball head coach
- Ben W. Hooper (1870–1957), governor of Tennessee, 1911–1915
- L. D. Ottinger (born 1938), NASCAR driver
- Jimmy Owens (born 1972), dirt late model driver
- James Henry Randolph (1825–1900), U.S. congressman
- Kiffin Yates Rockwell (1892–1916), World War I pilot
- Pop-Boy Smith (1892–1924), baseball pitcher
- Marshall Teague (born 1953), actor
