= McGaha =

McGaha is a surname shared by several people:

- Charles L. McGaha (1914–1984), United States Army soldier in World War II and recipient of the Medal of Honor
- Chris McGaha (born 1986), American footballer
- James E. McGaha, American astronomer, for whom the asteroid 10036 McGaha was named
- Kris McGaha (born 1966), American actress, comedian, and television program hostess
- Mel McGaha (1926–2002), American professional baseball coach
- Vernie McGaha (born 1947), American state politician
- Tracy McGaha (born 1972), American Scientist, Immunologist at the Princess Margaret Cancer Centre and University of Toronto
