= Jimmy Mann Evans Memorial Bridge =

Highway bridge in Tennessee, United States

- Coordinates: 35.86791°N 87.94320°W
- Carries: 4 lanes of I-40
- Crosses: Kentucky Lake, part of the Tennessee River
- Locale: Humphreys and Benton counties, Tennessee

Characteristics
- Design: Girder bridge
- Total length: 2,671.1 ft (814.2 m)
- Width: 89 ft (27 m)

History
- Construction start: November 29, 1962
- Construction end: July 21, 1965
- Opened: July 24, 1966

Statistics
- Daily traffic: 35,409 (2025)

Location
- Interactive map of Jimmy Mann Evans Memorial Bridge

The Jimmy Mann Evans Memorial Bridge is a 1/2-mile-long (0.80 km), steel stringer, multibeam bridge which carries Interstate 40 (I-40) across Kentucky Lake, part of the Tennessee River, in the western part of the U.S. state of Tennessee. The bridge also spans the boundaries between Benton and Humphreys counties and the western and middle parts of the state.

== Description ==
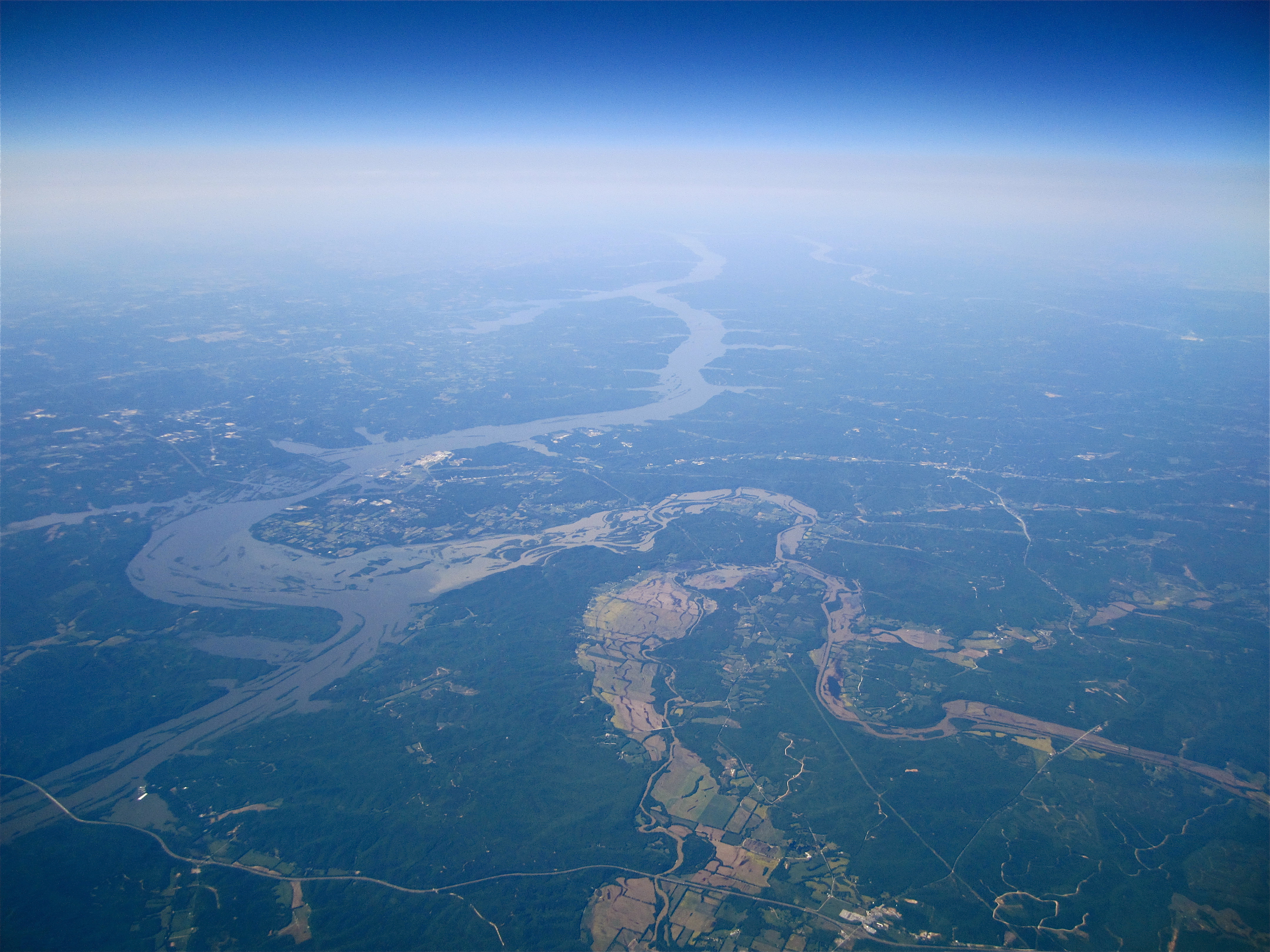
High-altitude view of the Tennessee River looking north, with the Jimmy Mann Evans Memorial Bridge in the bottom left

The Jimmy Mann Evans Memorial Bridge is maintained by the Tennessee Department of Transportation (TDOT). It carries four lanes of I-40 on a single structure across the Kentucky Lake impoundment of the Tennessee River. This is the historical boundary between Middle and West Tennessee, as defined in the Tennessee State Constitution. West of the bridge is a causeway above a floodplain created by Kentucky Dam. The bridge is 2,671.1 feet (814.2 m) long, with a main span that is 450.2 feet (137.2 m) long.

== History ==
Construction began on the bridge on November 29, 1962. The bridge was the largest project on I-40 between Memphis and Nashville. It was completed on July 21, 1965. The entire project cost $4.62 million (equivalent to $35 million in 2024). The segment of I-40 between Memphis and Nashville, the first section of Interstate Highway completed between two major cities in Tennessee, was dedicated on July 24, 1966, in a ceremony officiated by then-governor Frank G. Clement and U.S. Senator Albert Gore Sr. on the bridge. The bridge was renovated in 1992 and named after Jimmy Mann Evans, who served as president of the Tennessee Road Builders Association and as commissioner of the Tennessee Department of Transportation (TDOT) from 1987 until his death in 1992.

The murder of Holly Bobo reportedly took place underneath the bridge in April 2011.

== See also ==
- List of crossings of the Tennessee River
