= SmartFIX40 =

Road construction project on I-40 in Knoxville, Tennessee, U.S.

SmartFix40
- SmartFix 40
- 2008 informational poster issued by TDOT for SmartFIX40, with local art of the new Hall of Fame Drive overpass.
- Features: 5.2 miles of roadway; 6 bridges; 4 ramps; 33 retaining walls; 1 tunnel
- Design: Highway design and bridge design - Wilbur Smith Associates; surveying - Wilson and Associates, P.C.
- Builder: BB SmartFIX Constructors (Charles Blalock and Sons, Inc. and Bell and Associates)
- Constructed: 2005-2009
- Completed: 2009
- Cost: $190 million (313 million in 2025 dollars)
- Owner: Tennessee Department of Transportation (TDOT)
- Manager: TDOT
- Location: Knoxville, Tennessee, U.S.
- Website: http://www.tdot.state.tn.us/smartfix/

SmartFIX40 was a major transportation improvement project coordinated by the Tennessee Department of Transportation (TDOT) along Interstate 40 (I-40) in downtown Knoxville, Tennessee. The project, referred to as the most ambitious TDOT project at the time, consisted of two separate phases and contracts, started construction in 2005 and was completed in June 2009 at a cost of $190 million. The second phase of the project required the closure of 1.5 miles of I-40 in downtown for a 14-month period, rerouting traffic onto the Interstate 640 (I-640) northern bypass of downtown. At the time of its completion, SmartFIX40 was the largest awarded contract and construction project in Tennessee history, and in retrospective documentation has received acclaim for its methods of accelerated construction and project delivery, including nationwide awards from the American Association of State Highway and Transportation Officials (AASHTO).

== Background ==
The current freeway system in Knoxville originated from a 1945 plan commissioned by the city that recommended a series of controlled-access highways be constructed to relieve congestion on surface streets. Planners intended these routes to be integrated into the then-planned nationwide freeway network that became the Interstate Highway System. This plan included three major arteries out of the city; and east–west route known as the West Expressway and East Expressway, and a north–south route known as the North–South Expressway. These three routes would come together at a junction near downtown. A northern beltway known as the Dutch Valley Loop would bypass downtown to the north. The plan was expanded in 1951 to include a square-shaped freeway loop around downtown known as the Downtown Loop. The northern leg of this loop included the East–West Expressway, which became known as the Magnolia Avenue Expressway at this time, and was the first freeway in Tennessee.

With the passage of the Federal-Aid Highway Act of 1956 most of the freeway system in Knoxville became part of the Interstate Highway System. In 1957, the East Expressway became part of I-40, the North-South Expressway part of I-75, and the West Expressway a concurrency of both routes. The following year, the Dutch Valley Loop became I-640, and the Downtown Loop was designated SR 158. Part of the section of I-40 that was reconstructed in SmartFix40 was a long viaduct that was originally part of the eastern leg of the Magnolia Avenue Expressway, opened to traffic on December 10, 1955. The remainder of the section, including the interchanges with SR 158 and Hall of Fame Drive, opened on April 11, 1967. The controlled-access section of SR 158 directly south of this interchange opened on June 23, 1964, and the adjacent section to the south opened on September 15, 1973. This route was renamed James White Parkway in 1991. The completion of I-40/75 in West Knoxville resulted in the commercial center of the city shifting to the west, and as a result, the original plans for a complete beltway around downtown were never realized.

Within a few years of the completion of I-40 and I-75 in Knoxville, the city's highway network was already starting to suffer from congestion and a high accident rate. The interchange between I-40 and SR 158, which included left-hand entrance and exit ramps on I-40 westbound, became a particularly hazardous point. Reconstruction of this interchange was suggested as early as 1971. Improving the section of I-40 west of where SmartFIX40 would take place became a more urgent priority as the city began to expand to the west. By the mid-1970s, the cloverleaf interchange between I-40 and I-75 was suffering from severe congestion, and had earned the nickname "Malfunction Junction". Between May 1980 and March 1982, TDOT undertook a massive $250 million (equivalent to $686 million in 2024) project that reconstructed Malfunction Junction, widened sections of I-40 and I-75 approaching downtown, reconstructed and improved interchanges on these Interstates, and completed I-640. I-75 was also rerouted from downtown Knoxville onto the western leg of I-640 during this time, and the freeway section between I-40 and I-640 became I-275. This project was undertaken on an accelerated timescale in preparation for the 1982 World's Fair. The two-lane section of I-40 east of downtown was not included in this project, but nevertheless, TDOT began making preparations for improvements to this problematic spot.

== Preliminary planning and design ==
TDOT would embark on a constructability analysis of the reconstruction of I-40 through downtown in a meeting with federal, state, and local leaders in February 2003.

In April 2004, TDOT hosted a workshop meeting, dubbed the Accelerated Construction Technology Transfer (ACTT) workshop. The ACTT involved 82 transportation engineering professionals across 19 states discussing methods to satisfy TDOT's main goal of minimizing time during the construction phase of SmartFIX40. Several areas of concern were addressed such as structures such as retaining walls and bridges, materials, accelerated testing of materials, geotechnical issues, intelligent transportation systems, and constructability. The closure of I-40 through downtown Knoxville and utilizing the I-640 bypass as a detour route was recommended.

Transportation engineering firm Wilbur Smith Associates was selected by TDOT as the consultant tasked with the planning and design of the SmartFIX40 corridor. With initial projections of four years to complete SmartFIX40, Wilbur-Smith drafted a design and construction plan that reduced the project's schedule to just 14 months, saving more than $20 million in state funding. The outsourcing of the engineering work for SmartFIX40 also reduced the need for additional hiring of engineers at TDOT if the project was performed in-house.

== Construction ==
Due to its size, the SmartFIX40 project was broken into two phases, and awarded in separate contracts. Both phases would be awarded to BB SmartFIX Constructors, a joint venture of two heavy highway construction general contractors, Ray Bell & Associates of Brentwood, Tennessee, and Charles Blalock & Sons of Sevierville, Tennessee. The first contract was awarded at a price over $80 million, and the second at a price of $104.6 million.

For the first time in the history of TDOT, it would enforce a "no excuse" deadline, requiring both phases to be completed by BB SmartFIX Constructors at or before the contract's documented day of completion. If neither phase met its deadline, TDOT would issue fines of $25,000 per day as liquidated damages for late completion.
