= Charles L. McGaha =

US Army soldier and Medal of Honor recipient

- Born: February 26, 1914; Cosby, Tennessee
- Died: August 8, 1984 (aged 70); Columbus, Georgia
- Burial place: Union Cemetery, Newport, Tennessee
- Military career
- Allegiance: United States
- Branch: United States Army
- Rank: Major
- Unit: 35th Infantry Regiment
- Conflicts: World War II: Solomon Islands campaign; Philippines campaign (1944–45)
- Awards: Medal of Honor; Silver Star; Purple Heart (4)

Charles L. McGaha (February 26, 1914 – August 8, 1984) was a United States Army soldier and a recipient of the United States military's highest decoration—the Medal of Honor—for his actions in World War II.

== Biography ==
McGaha was born in the small town of Cosby in eastern Tennessee to Laura McGaha. His family had a long history of service in the United States military. In October 1937, at age 23, he traveled to Asheville, North Carolina, hoping to enlist in the United States Navy. The Navy recruiter, having filled his quota of enlistees, turned him away, so McGaha left for Knoxville to enlist in the United States Army instead.

In 1941, McGaha was stationed in Pearl Harbor, Hawaii, with Company G of the 35th Infantry Regiment, 25th Infantry Division. He was there when the Japanese attacked on December 7, 1941, precipitating the United States' entrance into World War II.

McGaha fought in the Guadalcanal Campaign and the northern Solomons before participating in the campaign to recapture the Philippines from Japanese control. On February 7, 1945, he was serving as a master sergeant during the Battle of Luzon. On that day, near Lupao, Luzon, he repeatedly exposed himself to enemy fire in order to aid wounded soldiers, led his platoon after the platoon leader was wounded, and deliberately drew Japanese fire onto himself so that others could escape to safety. For these actions, he was nominated for the Medal of Honor and given a battlefield commission to second lieutenant. McGaha was then discharged from the Army, but soon re-enlisted as a master sergeant and was stationed at Fort Benning, Georgia. His nomination for the Medal of Honor was approved a year after the battle, on April 2, 1946. During a ceremony at the White House on March 27, 1946, President Harry S. Truman formally presented McGaha and another man, Navy Commander Richard O'Kane, with Medals of Honor.

In December 1949, McGaha married Jeanette Large.

McGaha again became a commissioned officer and reached the rank of major before retiring from the Army.

McGaha died at age 70, after being stabbed forty times in an apparent robbery attempt, and was buried in Union Cemetery, Newport, Tennessee.

== Medal of Honor citation ==
=== Medal of Honor citation ===
McGaha's official Medal of Honor citation reads:

He displayed conspicuous gallantry and intrepidity. His platoon and 1 other from Company G were pinned down in a roadside ditch by heavy fire from 5 Japanese tanks supported by 10 machine guns and a platoon of riflemen. When 1 of his men fell wounded 40 yards (37 m) away, he unhesitatingly crossed the road under a hail of bullets and moved the man 75 yards (69 m) to safety. Although he had suffered a deep arm wound, he returned to his post. Finding the platoon leader seriously wounded, he assumed command and rallied his men. Once more he braved the enemy fire to go to the aid of a litter party removing another wounded soldier. A shell exploded in their midst, wounding him in the shoulder and killing 2 of the party. He picked up the remaining man, carried him to cover, and then moved out in front deliberately to draw the enemy fire while the American forces, thus protected, withdrew to safety. When the last man had gained the new position, he rejoined his command and there collapsed from loss of blood and exhaustion. M/Sgt. McGaha set an example of courage and leadership in keeping with the highest traditions of the service.

== Awards and decorations ==

Badge	Combat Infantryman Badge		
1st row	Medal of Honor		Silver Star
2nd row	Bronze Star Medal	Purple Heart with 3 Oak leaf clusters	Army Good Conduct Medal
3rd row	American Defense Service Medal with Foreign Service clasp	American Campaign Medal	Asiatic-Pacific Campaign Medal with 4 Campaign stars
4th row	World War II Victory Medal	Philippine Liberation Medal	National Defense Service with 1 Oak leaf cluster
Badge	Master Parachutists Badge		
Unit awards	Presidential Unit Citation		Philippine Presidential Unit Citation

== See also ==
- List of Medal of Honor recipients
- List of Medal of Honor recipients for World War II
