= U.S. Route 25W =

Highway in Tennessee and Kentucky, United States

U.S. Route 25W
- US 25W highlighted in red

Route information
- Auxiliary route of US 25
- Maintained by KYTC and TDOT
- Length: 145.7 mi (Note: The total mileage is only an estimate as TDOT does not have an official state highway mileage total report like KYTC does.) (234.5 km)
- Existed: November 26, 1926–present
- Tourist routes: Cumberland Historic Byway

Major junctions
- South end: US 25 / US 25E / US 70 at Newport, TN
- I-40 at Newport, TN; US 411 at Newport, TN; US 11E at Strawberry Plains, TN; I-40 in Knoxville, TN; I-75 / I-275 / I-640 in Knoxville, TN; US 441 in Rocky Top, TN; I-75 from Rocky Top to Caryville, TN; I-75 at Jellico, TN; I-75 at Corbin, KY
- North end: US 25 / US 25E at North Corbin, KY

Location
- Country: United States
- Counties: TN: Cocke, Jefferson, Sevier, Knox, Anderson, Campbell; KY: Whitley, Laurel

Highway system
- United States Numbered Highway System; List; Special; Divided
- Kentucky State Highway System; Interstate; US; State; Parkways
- Tennessee State Routes; Interstate; US; State
← US 25E	KY	→ KY 26
← US 25E	TN	→ SR 25

U.S. Route 25W (US 25W) is the western branch of US 25 from Newport, Tennessee, where US 25 splits into US 25E and US 25W, to North Corbin, Kentucky, where the two highways rejoin.

US 25W has been included in the United States Numbered Highway System since the system's inception in 1926.

== Route description ==
=== Tennessee ===
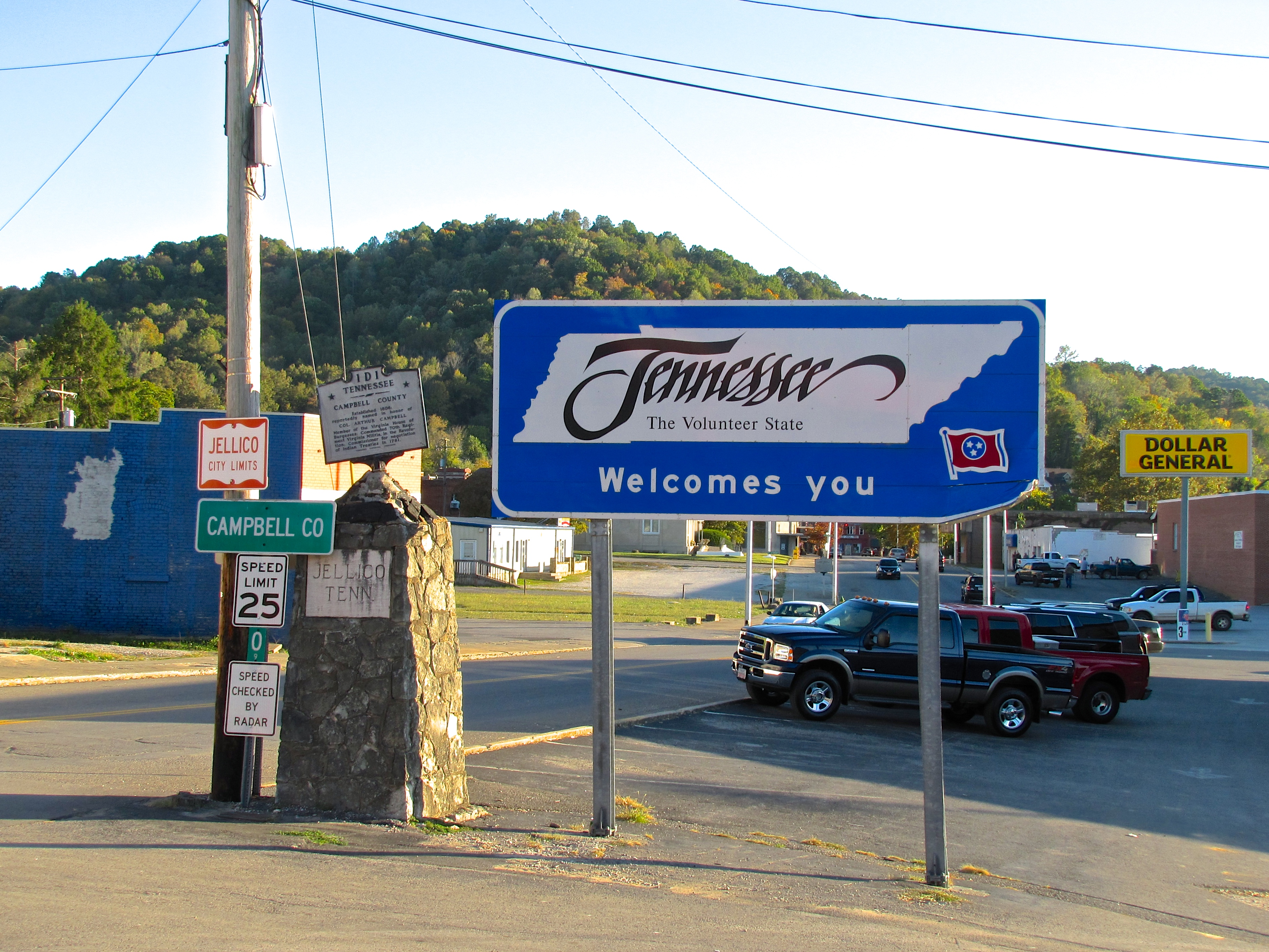
Tennessee welcome sign ("Tennessee welcomes you") at the Tennessee–Kentucky state line in Jellico, Tennessee

US 25W carries the unsigned designation of State Route 9 (SR 9) throughout the state.

US 25 splits into US 25W and US 25E on the west side of downtown Newport. Here, SR 32 goes north on US 25E and US 70/SR 9/SR 35 continue on US 25W. The concurrency then has a full interchange with Interstate 40 (I-40; exits 432A–B) before US 411/SR 35 separate and turn south while US 25W/US 70/SR 9 leave Newport and cross into Jefferson County.

Immediately after crossing the county line, they intersect SR 363 in Reidtown and then cross Douglas Lake parallel to the I-40 bridge. After crossing the lake, they intersect SR 113 and then proceed to Dandridge where SR 66 joins the concurrency. US 25W/US 70/SR 9/SR 66 next intersect and become concurrent with SR 92, passing by downtown to the north (SR 66 is unsigned at this intersection). SR 92 separates from the concurrency which proceeds to have another interchange with I-40 (exit 415); SR 66 separates thereafter and runs concurrent to I-40 before leaving Dandridge. US 25W/US 70/SR 9 continue west through rural Jefferson County before coming to an intersection with Snyder Road (which connects to SR 66 and Sevierville) and becoming concurrent with SR 139 before crossing into Sevier County.

Once across the county line, SR 139 separates and turns south toward Kodak while US 25W/US 70/SR 9 continue west to cross into Knox County.

The highway then has an interchange with US 11E/SR 34 in Carter (also known as Trentville) with US 11E joining the concurrency as they enter Knoxville. US 11E/US 25W/US 70/SR 9 then intersect SR 168 (Governor John Sevier Highway) before crossing a bridge over the Holston River. After this section, US 25W/SR 9 leaves the US 11E/US 70 concurrency to join I-40 at exit 394. It travels a short way before leaving I-40 to follow I-640 (exit 385). They then have interchanges with Mall Road (which provides access to Knoxville Center Mall at exit 8), US 441/SR 33/SR 331 (Broadway; which provides access to Fountain City at exit 6), and I-75/I-275 (exit 3A) before separating from I-640 to turn north at exit 3B. US 25W/SR 9 continues through the North Knoxville neighborhood as Clinton Highway and leaves Knoxville to enter Powell. In Powell, they intersect and have a short concurrency with SR 131 before leaving Powell and crossing into Anderson County.

The highway next enters Claxton and becomes a very curvy four-lane undivided highway. In Claxton, US 25W/SR 9 intersects SR 170 and continues north from Claxton, winding its way through rural areas for a few miles to enter Clinton. Here, they intersect SR 61 before going straight through the historic downtown as Main Street. US 25W/SR 9 then leave Clinton, becoming curvy again before going through Medford to enter Rocky Top. In Rocky Top, US 25W/SR 9 goes through downtown to intersect and become concurrent with SR 116. The highway next intersects US 441/SR 71 (which provides access to Norris Lake and Dam) before coming to an interchange where US 25W/SR 9 becomes concurrent with I-75 (exit 129) leaving SR 116 to trace the historical route of US 25W/SR 9.

They cross into Campbell County and enter Caryville where they separate from I-75 (exit 134) and become concurrent with SR 63. Immediately afterward, they intersect the northern end of SR 116 and pass by Cove Lake, Cove Lake State Park, and Caryville Dam before leaving Caryville to enter Jacksboro. In Jacksboro, US 25W/SR 9/SR 63 bypass downtown to the north and go through Jacksboro's main business area before proceeding into downtown LaFollette. There, they separate from SR 63 and turn north, becoming very curvy again as the road enters mountainous terrain to pass through Duff, cross Brushy Mountain Gap, then descend into the valley carved by Lick Creek and the Clear Fork of the Cumberland River. Here, they pass through Habersham then intersect SR 90 at Morley. US 25W/SR 9 finally enters Jellico and have another interchange with I-75 (exit 160) before proceeding to downtown and intersecting SR 297 before turning north and ending at the Kentucky state line, with US 25W continuing north alone into Kentucky.

=== Kentucky ===
Upon entry into Whitley County, US 25W runs parallel with and closely follow I-75 for the rest of its course, including the points where it traverses the towns of Williamsburg and Corbin. It continues to parallel Clear Fork as the highway travels down a narrow valley, passing through the communities of Red Ash, Saxton, Pleasant View, and Emlyn. US 25W enters Williamsburg and immediately intersects with KY 92, running concurrently with it as they cross over the Cumberland River and KY 92 leaves the concurrency to head east to Pineville after about one mile (1.6 km). The highway follows the east bank of the river, passes the entrance to downtown and continues north through the Highland Park neighborhood before leaving Williamsburg and intersecting KY 26 near Wofford. It then intersects I-75 (exit 15) with an unusual (for Kentucky) double roundabout interchange before winding its way north through farmland and rural areas. US 25W next intersects with KY 90 (providing access to Cumberland Falls) and KY 1193 before entering Corbin and crossing I-75 for the last time (exit 25). It passes through a business district and some neighborhoods, where it has an intersection with KY 3041 (Corbin Bypass), before meeting back up with KY 26 and passing straight through downtown via a one-way pair between Main Street and Kentucky Avenue. The highway passes through more neighborhoods before crossing Lynn Camp Creek into North Corbin and Laurel County. US 25W passes straight through downtown before coming to an intersection north of town, where US 25E and US 25W reunites to become US 25. However, US 25E continues west of this point to terminate at exit 29 of I-75.

== History ==
In Whitley County, Kentucky, US 25W originally ran the current routing of KY 26, and KY 90 terminated in downtown Corbin. KY 26 originally ran to KY 90 west of Corbin. At sometime in the 1940s, US 25W was rerouted to its current alignment to provide easier access to Cumberland Falls, and KY 26 ran US 25W's original course between Corbin and Williamsburg.

== Major intersections ==
State	County	Location	mi	km	Destinations	Notes
Tennessee	Cocke	Newport	0.00	0.00	US 25E north (Dixie Highway/SR 32 north) / US 25 south / US 70 east (W Broadway Street/SR 9 east/SR 32 south/SR 35 north) – Newport, Morristown	Southern terminus; US 25W south and US 25E merge to form US 25; southern end of unsigned SR 9/SR 35 concurrency
Tennessee	Cocke	Newport	2.2– 2.9	3.5– 4.7	I-40 – Knoxville, Asheville	I-40 exit 432
Tennessee	Cocke	Newport	3.5	5.6	US 411 south (SR 35 south) – Sevierville	Northern terminus of US 411; northern end of SR 35 concurrency
Tennessee	Jefferson	Reidtown	4.5	7.2	SR 363 west (Indian Creek Road)	Eastern terminus of SR 363
Tennessee	Jefferson		9.6– 10.1	15.4– 16.3	Bridge over Douglas Lake/French Broad River	
Tennessee	Jefferson		10.3	16.6	SR 113 north to I-40 – White Pine, Morristown	Southern terminus of SR 113
Tennessee	Jefferson	Dandridge	13.9	22.4	SR 66 north (Valley Home Road) – White Pine, Morristown	Southern end of SR 66 wrong-way concurrency
Tennessee	Jefferson	Dandridge	14.7	23.7	SR 92 south (Gay Street) to SR 139 – Chestnut Hill	Southern end of SR 92 concurrency
Tennessee	Jefferson	Dandridge	15.4	24.8	SR 92 north to I-40 – Jefferson City	Northern end of SR 92 concurrency
Tennessee	Jefferson		18.3– 18.5	29.5– 29.8	I-40 / SR 66 south – Knoxville, Asheville	I-40 exit 415; northern end of SR 66 wrong-way concurrency
Tennessee	Jefferson	Strawberry Plains	26.3	42.3	SR 139 north (Old Dandridge Pike) – Strawberry Plains; Snyder Road to SR 66 - Kodak, Sevierville	Southern end of SR 139 concurrency
Tennessee	Sevier	Strawberry Plains	27.8	44.7	SR 139 south (Douglas Dam Road) – Kodak	Northern end of SR 139 concurrency
Tennessee	Knox	Carter	33.0	53.1	US 11E north (Andrew Johnson Highway/SR 34 east) – Strawberry Plains, New Market, Jefferson City	Access to US 11E accessible from US 25W/US 70 east only; southern end of US 11E concurrency; Unsigned SR 9 becomes a primary route; western terminus of unsigned SR 34
Tennessee	Knox	Knoxville	38.5	62.0	SR 168 west (Governor John Sevier Highway) – South Knoxville	Southern end of SR 168 concurrency
Tennessee	Knox	Knoxville	38.6– 38.8	62.1– 62.4	Bridge over the Holston River	
Tennessee	Knox	Knoxville	39.3	63.2	I-40 east / US 11E south / US 70 west (Asheville Highway/SR 168) – Asheville, Downtown Knoxville	I-40 exit 394; northern end of US 11E/US 70/SR 168 concurrency; southern end of I-40 concurrency
Tennessee	Knox	Knoxville	40.3	64.9	I-40 west / I-640 begins – Knoxville	Northern end of I-40 concurrency; eastern terminus of I-640; southern end of I-640 concurrency; I-40 Exit 393
Tennessee	Knox	Knoxville	41.7– 43.2	67.1– 69.5	Washington Pike/Mall Road/Millertown Pike	I-640 exit 8; provides access to Knoxville Center (East Towne Mall)
Tennessee	Knox	Knoxville	44.8– 45.5	72.1– 73.2	US 441 / SR 33 (Broadway/SR 71) / SR 331 (Old Broadway) – Knoxville, Fountain City	I-640 exit 6; only US 441 is signed along I-640
Tennessee	Knox	Knoxville	47.2	76.0	I-75 north / I-275 south – Downtown Knoxville, Lexington	I-275 exit 3; I-75 exit 106; southern end of I-75 concurrency; northern terminus of I-275
Tennessee	Knox	Knoxville	47.5	76.4	I-75 south / I-640 west – Chattanooga, Nashville	Northern end of I-640 and I-75 concurrencies; I-75/640 exit 3A
Tennessee	Knox	Powell	52.9	85.1	SR 131 north (Powell Drive) – Halls Crossroads	Southern end of SR 131 concurrency
Tennessee	Knox	Powell	53.4	85.9	SR 131 south (West Emory Road) – Karns	Northern end of SR 131 concurrency
Tennessee	Anderson	Claxton	57.4	92.4	SR 170 (Edgemoor Road/Raccoon Valley Road) – Oak Ridge, Heiskell	
Tennessee	Anderson	Clinton	61.6– 61.8	99.1– 99.5	William Everette Lewallen Memorial Bridge over the Clinch River	
Tennessee	Anderson	Clinton	61.8	99.5	SR 61 (Charles G. Seivers Blvd) to I-75 – Norris, Oak Ridge	Unsigned SR 9 becomes a secondary route
Tennessee	Anderson	Rocky Top	71.6	115.2	SR 116 south (Creek Street) – Briceville	Southern end of SR 116 concurrency
Tennessee	Anderson	Rocky Top	72.1	116.0	US 441 south (Norris Freeway/SR 71 south) to I-75 – Norris, Miami	Northern terminus of US 441/SR 71; provides access to Norris Dam, Norris Lake, and Norris Dam State Park
Tennessee	Anderson	Rocky Top	72.4– 72.6	116.5– 116.8	I-75 south / SR 116 north (N Main Street) – Knoxville, Caryville	I-75 exit 129; northern end of SR 116 concurrency; southern end of I-75 concurrency
Tennessee	Campbell	Caryville	78.0	125.5	I-75 north / SR 63 west – Lexington, Huntsville	I-75 exit 134; northern end of I-75 concurrency; southern end of SR 63 concurrency
Tennessee	Campbell	Caryville	78.3	126.0	SR 116 south (John McGhee Boulevard) – Vasper, Rocky Top	Northern terminus of SR 116
Tennessee	Campbell	Caryville	79.0	127.1	Cove Lake Lane - Cove Lake State Park	Access road into park
Tennessee	Campbell	LaFollette	86.4	139.0	SR 63 east (E Central Avenue) – Harrogate, Cumberland Gap, Middlesboro, KY	Northern end of SR 63 concurrency; provides access to Cumberland Gap National Historical Park
Tennessee	Campbell	Morley	102.7	165.3	SR 90 east – White Oak, Eagan, Clairfield, Pruden, Middlesboro, KY	Western terminus of SR 90
Tennessee	Campbell	Jellico	109.0– 109.3	175.4– 175.9	I-75 – Knoxville, Lexington	I-75 exit 160
Tennessee	Campbell	Jellico	110.3	177.5	SR 297 west (S Main Street) – Newcomb, Elk Valley, Pioneer, Huntsville	Eastern terminus of SR 297; provides access to Indian Mountain State Park
State line			110.6 0.000	178.0 0.000	Tennessee–Kentucky state line Northern end of SR 9 concurrency	
Kentucky	Whitley		0.485	0.781	KY 1804 north	Southern terminus of KY 1804
Kentucky	Whitley	Saxton	3.379	5.438	KY 2996 west (West Creek-Saxton Road)	Eastern terminus of KY 2996
Kentucky	Whitley	Saxton	3.507	5.644	KY 1804 south	Northern terminus of KY 1084
Kentucky	Whitley	Pleasant View	6.819	10.974	KY 628 west (Wolf Creek Road)	Eastern terminus of KY 628
Kentucky	Whitley	Williamsburg	10.923	17.579	KY 92 west to I-75 – Pine Knot	Southern end of KY 92 concurrency
Kentucky	Whitley	Williamsburg	11.105– 11.205	17.872– 18.033	Bridge over Cumberland River	
Kentucky	Whitley	Williamsburg	11.533	18.561	KY 92 east – Pineville	Northern end of KY 92 concurrency
Kentucky	Whitley	Williamsburg	12.125	19.513	KY 856 north (Old Corbin Pike Road)	Southern terminus of KY 856
Kentucky	Whitley	Williamsburg	12.319– 12.422	19.826– 19.991	KY 296 west (Cumberland Avenue/Main Street) – Downtown Williamsburg, University of the Cumberlands	Eastern terminus of KY 296; one-way pair between Cumberland Avenue and Main Street
Kentucky	Whitley	Williamsburg	13.694	22.038	KY 856 south (Old Corbin Pike Road)	Northern terminus of KY 856
Kentucky	Whitley	Williamsburg	14.127	22.735	KY 26 north – Rockholds, Woodbine	Southern terminus of KY 26
Kentucky	Whitley		16.205– 16.249	26.079– 26.150	I-75 – Lexington, Knoxville	I-75 exit 15
Kentucky	Whitley		17.718	28.514	KY 836 east	Western terminus of KY 836
Kentucky	Whitley		18.789	30.238	KY 204 east – Williamsburg/Cumberland Falls Airport	Western terminus of KY 204
Kentucky	Whitley		21.914	35.267	KY 90 Spur west to KY 90 west	Eastern terminus of KY 90 Spur
Kentucky	Whitley		22.242	35.795	KY 90 west – Cumberland Falls S.R.P.	Eastern terminus of KY 90
Kentucky	Whitley		23.666	38.087	KY 511 east – Rockholds	Western terminus of KY 511
Kentucky	Whitley		24.861	40.010	KY 1193 north (Walker Branch Road) – Laurel River Lake	Southern terminus of KY 1193
Kentucky	Whitley		28.244	45.454	KY 727 east – Corbin	Western terminus of KY 727
Kentucky	Whitley	Corbin	29.551– 29.628	47.558– 47.682	I-75 – Knoxville, Lexington	I-75 exit 25
Kentucky	Whitley	Corbin	30.425	48.964	KY 3041 east (Corbin Bypass) to US 25E	Western terminus of KY 3041
Kentucky	Whitley	Corbin	30.795	49.560	KY 1259 west (Scuffletown Road)	Western terminus of KY 1259
Kentucky	Whitley	Corbin	32.115	51.684	KY 26 south (Main Street) – Woodbine, Rockholds	Northern terminus of KY 26
Kentucky	Whitley	Corbin	32.977	53.071	KY 727 west (Fourth Street)	Eastern terminus of KY 727
Kentucky	Whitley	Corbin	33.278	53.556	KY 312 west (Gordon Street)	Southern end of KY 312 concurrency
Kentucky	Whitley	Corbin	33.464	53.855	KY 312 east (Master Street)	Northern end of KY 312 concurrency
Kentucky	Laurel	North Corbin	34.142	54.946	KY 830 west (Colonel Street)	Eastern terminus of KY 830
Kentucky	Laurel	North Corbin	34.168	54.988	KY 1223 north (Rose Avenue)	Southern terminus of KY 1223
Kentucky	Laurel	North Corbin	34.308	55.213	KY 3431 north (Cherry Avenue)	Southern terminus of KY 3431
Kentucky	Laurel	North Corbin	34.799	56.004	US 25 north / US 25E (Cumberland Gap Parkway) to I-75 – London, Barbourville, Cumberland Gap	Northern terminus; continues as US 25
1.000 mi = 1.609 km; 1.000 km = 0.621 mi: Concurrency terminus; Incomplete access; Route transition
