= Anthras, Tennessee =

- Unincorporated community
- Location within Tennessee Location within the United States
- Coordinates: 36°32′45″N 83°59′25″W
- Country: United States
- State: Tennessee
- County: Campbell
- Elevation: 1,076 ft (328 m)
- Time zone: UTC-5 (Eastern (EST))
  - Summer (DST): UTC-4 (EDT)
- GNIS feature ID: 1275780

Anthras is an unincorporated community and coal town in Campbell County, Tennessee. It is located along Tennessee State Route 90 in the Clearfork Valley between Tackett Creek and Eagan.
