= Kentucky Route 74 =

State highway in Kentucky, United States

Kentucky Route 74
- KY 49 highlighted in red

Route information
- Maintained by KYTC
- Length: 16.753 mi (26.961 km)

Major junctions
- West end: SR 90 at the Tennessee state line in Pruden
- East end: US 25E in Middlesboro

Location
- Country: United States
- State: Kentucky
- Counties: Bell

Highway system
- Kentucky State Highway System; Interstate; US; State; Parkways
← KY 73	→ I-75

Kentucky Route 74 (KY 74) is a 16.753-mile state highway in Bell County, Kentucky that runs from Tennessee State Route 90 at the Kentucky-Tennessee border in the community of Pruden to U.S. Route 25E in Middlesboro.

== Related routes ==
=== Truck route ===
A truck route exists to route trucks around downtown Middlesboro. It begins at the intersection of U.S. Route 25E and 74 and follows US-25E for just over a mile and turns onto Kentucky Route 441 and follows 441 from US 25E on the northside of Middlesboro to back mainline 74.

== Major intersections ==
The entire route is in Bell County.

Location	mi	km	Destinations	Notes
Pruden	0.000	0.000	SR 90 west – Clairfield	Western terminus
	0.946	1.522	KY 535 east – Fonde	Western terminus of KY 535
	5.610	9.028	KY 3485 north (Henderson Hall Road)	Southern terminus of KY 3485 overlap
Middlesboro	12.955	20.849	KY 441 east (Belt Line Road)	Western terminus of KY 441
Middlesboro	13.700	22.048	KY 2396 north (Gibson Road)	Southern terminus of KY 2396
Middlesboro	14.278	22.978	KY 186 west (40th Street) / KY 1599 north (Airport Road)	Eastern terminus of KY 186; southern terminus of KY 1599
Middlesboro	14.484	23.310	KY 3502 south (South 38th Street)	Northern terminus of KY 3502
Middlesboro	15.190	24.446	KY 2401 (30th Street)	
Middlesboro	15.624	25.144	KY 2402 north (North 25th Street)	Southern terminus of KY 2402
Middlesboro	16.148	25.988	KY 2079 (Aylesbury Avenue)	
Middlesboro	16.753	26.961	US 25E (12th Street) / East Cumberland Avenue – Pineville, Harrogate, TN	Eastern terminus; continues as East Cumberland Avenue; provides access to Cumberland Gap National Historical Park
1.000 mi = 1.609 km; 1.000 km = 0.621 mi
