= White Oak, Tennessee =

- Unincorporated community
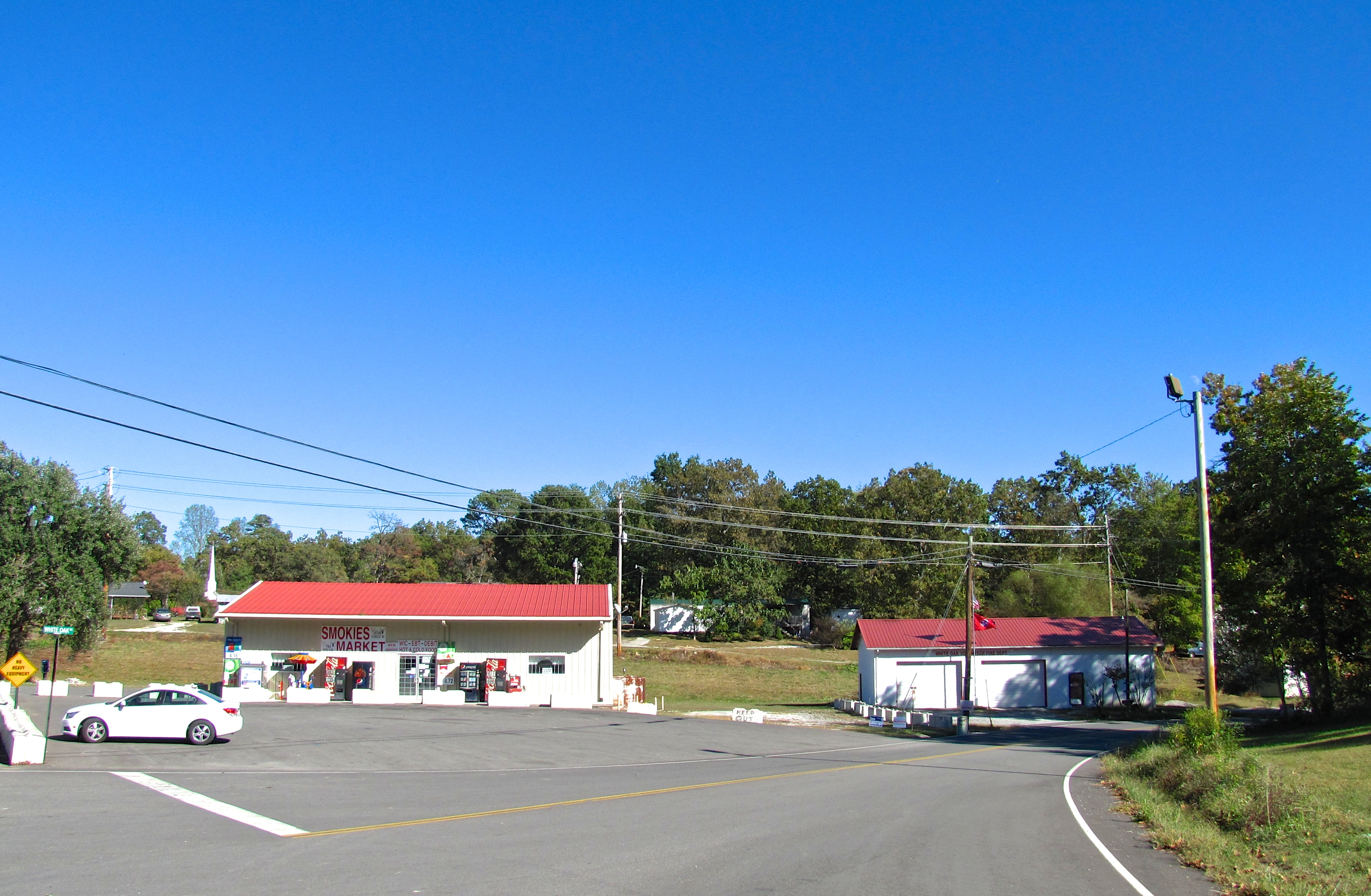
- Buildings at the intersection of SR 90 and Little White Oak Road

- Location within Tennessee Location within the United States
- Coordinates: 36°32′5″N 84°2′4″W
- Country: United States
- State: Tennessee
- County: Campbell
- Elevation: 1,480 ft (450 m)
- Time zone: UTC-5 (Eastern (EST))
  - Summer (DST): UTC-4 (EDT)
- ZIP code: 37729
- Area code: 423
- GNIS feature ID: 1274385

White Oak is an unincorporated community in Campbell County, Tennessee, United States. A former coal mining town, White Oak is situated atop a ridge known as Hickory Hill in the Cumberland Mountains of northern Campbell County. State Route 90 passes through the community, connecting it to U.S. Route 25W to the west, and the Clearfork Valley to the east.

White Oak is home to an elementary school, a volunteer fire department, and a small grocery store.
