= Jacksboro, Tennessee =

- Town
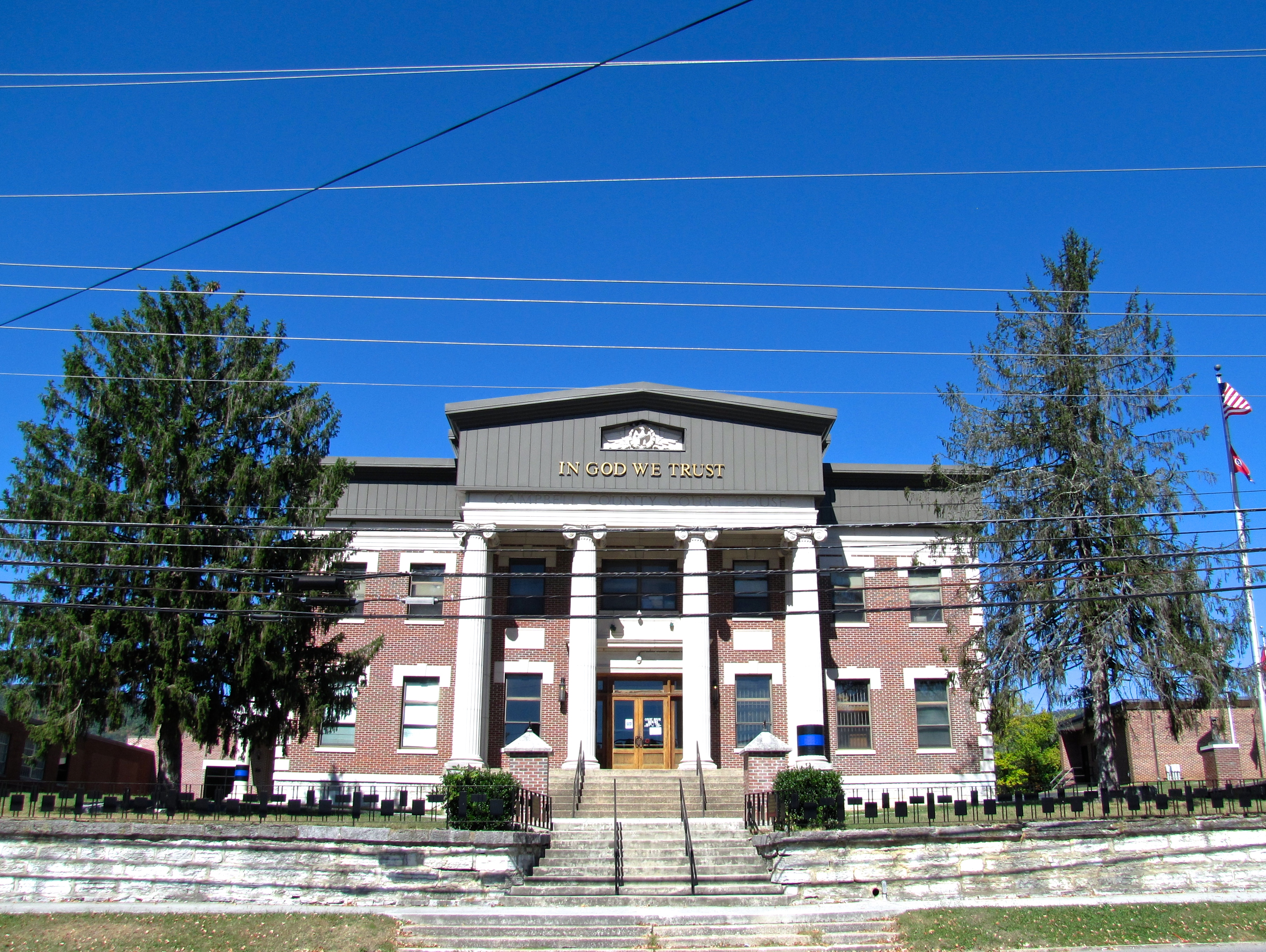
- Campbell County Courthouse in Jacksboro

- Location of Jacksboro in Campbell County, Tennessee.
- Coordinates: 36°19′53″N 84°11′20″W
- Country: United States
- State: Tennessee
- County: Campbell
- Founded: 1806
- Incorporated: 1967
- Named for: Andrew Jackson

Area
  - Total: 2.58 sq mi (6.68 km^{2})
  - Land: 2.58 sq mi (6.68 km^{2})
  - Water: 0 sq mi (0.00 km^{2})
- Elevation: 1,099 ft (335 m)

Population (2020)
  - Total: 2,306
  - Density: 893.4/sq mi (344.96/km^{2})
- Time zone: UTC-5 (Eastern (EST))
  - Summer (DST): UTC-4 (EDT)
- ZIP code: 37757
- Area code: 423
- FIPS code: 47-37600
- GNIS feature ID: 1289177
- Website: www.jacksboro.org

Jacksboro is a town in Campbell County, Tennessee, United States. The population was 2,306 at the 2020 census. It is the county seat of Campbell County.

== History ==
Jacksboro was founded in 1806 as a permanent county seat for the newly created Campbell County. The initial property for the town square was deeded by Hugh Montgomery, one of the earliest settlers in the area. The town was originally known as Walnut Grove, but was renamed "Jacksonboro" in honor of Andrew Jackson in 1819. The name was later shortened to "Jacksboro."

== Geography ==
Jacksboro is located at 36°19′53″N 84°11′20″W. The town situated near the "corner" of an L-shaped section of Powell Valley created by the intersection of Cumberland Mountain, a long ridge which runs in a northeast-southwest direction, and Cross Mountain, a 3,534-foot (1,077 m) summit which rises prominently to the west. Big Creek and Cove Creek — which traverse the eastern and western sections of Jacksboro respectively — are both part of the Norris Lake system of the Clinch River watershed.

Jacksboro is concentrated along U.S. Route 25W, approximately 2 miles (3.2 km) northeast of Interstate 75 and a mile northeast of Cove Lake State Park. Caryville lies to the southwest, and LaFollette lies to the northeast.

According to the United States Census Bureau, the town has a total area of 2.6 square miles (6.7 km^{2}), all land.

== Demographics ==
Historical population
Census	Pop.	Note	%±
1870	178		—
1880	274		53.9%
1890	374		36.5%
1900	621		66.0%
1910	834		34.3%
1920	638		−23.5%
1930	834		30.7%
1970	689		—
1980	1,722		149.9%
1990	1,568		−8.9%
2000	1,887		20.3%
2010	2,020		7.0%
2020	2,306		14.2%

=== 2020 census ===
Jacksboro racial composition
Race	Number	Percentage
White (non-Hispanic)	2,178	94.45%
Black or African American (non-Hispanic)	8	0.35%
Native American	1	0.04%
Asian	13	0.56%
Other/Mixed	80	3.47%
Hispanic or Latino	26	1.13%

As of the 2020 United States census, there were 2,306 people, 957 households, and 524 families residing in the town.

=== 2000 census ===
As of the census of 2000, there were 1,887 people, 767 households, and 550 families residing in the town. The population density was 723.0 inhabitants per square mile (279.2/km^{2}). There were 827 housing units at an average density of 316.9 per square mile (122.4/km^{2}). The racial makeup of the town was 98.04% White, 0.11% African American, 0.32% Native American, 0.11% Asian, 0.90% from other races, and 0.53% from two or more races. Hispanic or Latino of any race were 1.48% of the population.

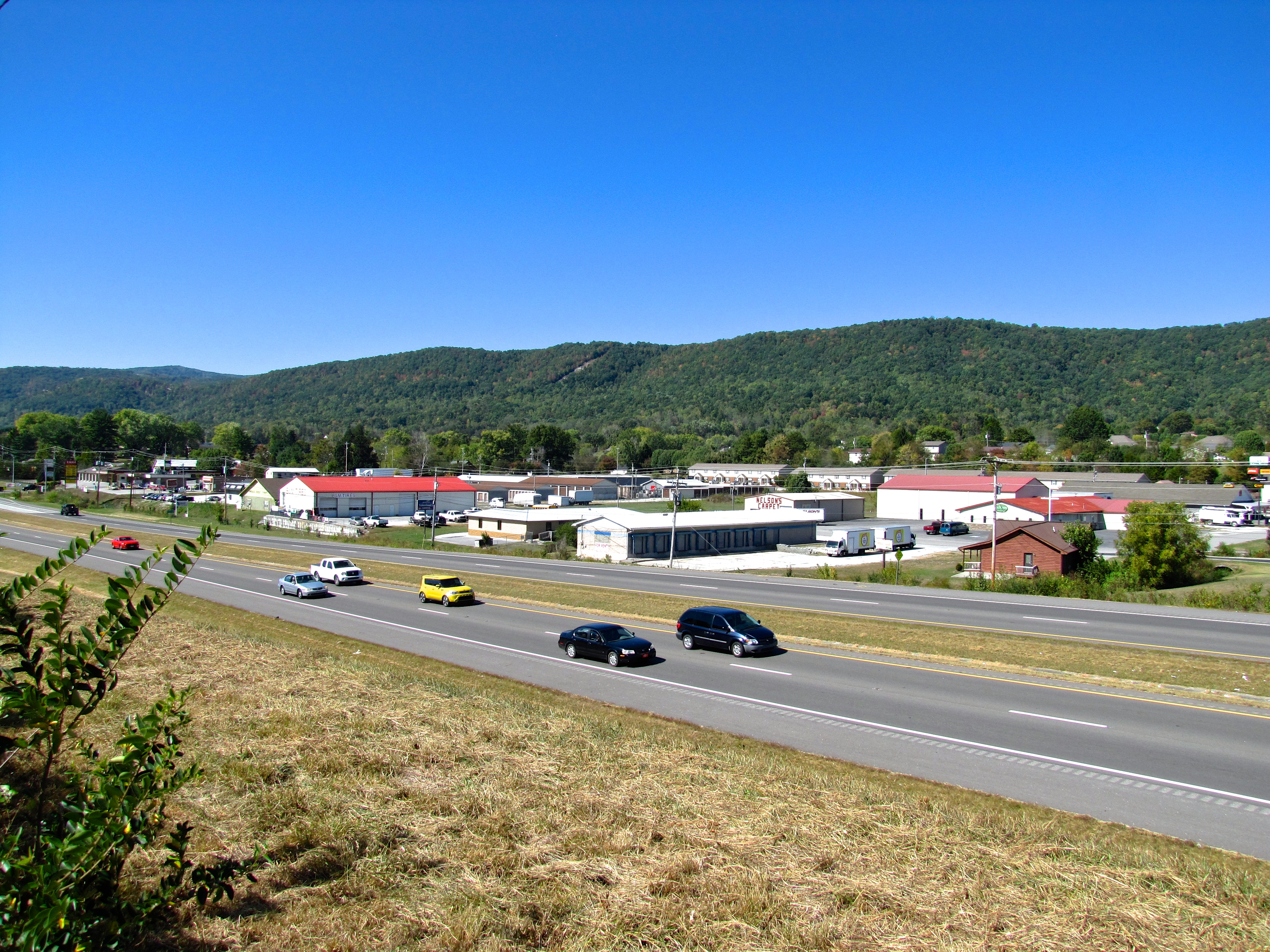
U.S. Route 25W in Jacksboro

There were 767 households, out of which 27.2% had children under the age of 18 living with them, 58.5% were married couples living together, 10.2% had a female householder with no husband present, and 28.2% were non-families. 26.1% of all households were made up of individuals, and 11.7% had someone living alone who was 65 years of age or older. The average household size was 2.34 and the average family size was 2.80.

In the town, the population was spread out, with 19.6% under the age of 18, 9.7% from 18 to 24, 29.8% from 25 to 44, 26.2% from 45 to 64, and 14.7% who were 65 years of age or older. The median age was 39 years. For every 100 females, there were 91.6 males. For every 100 females age 18 and over, there were 91.9 males.

The median income for a household in the town was $29,537, and the median income for a family was $36,607. Males had a median income of $32,708 versus $26,172 for females. The per capita income for the town was $16,150. About 12.2% of families and 18.7% of the population were below the poverty line, including 28.4% of those under age 18 and 14.3% of those age 65 or over.

== Notable people ==
- Joseph Alexander Cooper, Union general
- Henry R. Gibson, U.S. representative from Tennessee
- Bonnie Hollingsworth, Major League Baseball player
- John Jennings, Jr., U.S. representative from Tennessee
- Dennis Powers, Tennessee state representative
