= Tennessee State Route 90 =

State highway in Tennessee, United States

State Route 90
- SR 90 highlighted in red

Route information
- Maintained by TDOT
- Length: 13.5 mi (21.7 km)

Major junctions
- West end: US 25W in Morley
- East end: KY 74 at the Kentucky state line in Pruden

Location
- Country: United States
- State: Tennessee
- Counties: Campbell, Claiborne

Highway system
- Tennessee State Routes; Interstate; US; State
← SR 89	→ SR 91

State Route 90 (SR 90) is a 13.5-mile-long (21.7 km) state highway in Campbell and Claiborne counties in the U.S. state of Tennessee. It serves the communities of Morley, White Oak, Eagan and Clairfield in Tennessee, and Pruden at the Tennessee-Kentucky state line.

== Route description ==
SR 90 begins in northern Campbell County at an intersection with U.S. Route 25W (US 25W) in the community of Morley, north of LaFollette and southeast of Jellico. The route then twists and turns through the Cumberland Mountains of northern Tennessee, climbing through a series of switchback curves to the top of Hickory Hill, where it passes through White Oak. After descending from this ridge to Tackett Creek, the highway veers northeastward into the Clearfork Valley, where it traverses the communities of Anthras, Eagan, and Clairfield. It comes to an end at Kentucky Route 74 at the Kentucky state line in the old mining community of Pruden. KY 74 continues eastward through rugged mountain terrain to Middlesboro, Kentucky.

The route crosses the Clear Fork River twice and parallels the river for much of its length.

== Major intersections ==
County	Location	mi	km	Destinations	Notes
Campbell	Morley	0.0	0.0	US 25W (SR 9) – LaFollette, Jellico	Western terminus
Claiborne	Pruden	13.5	21.7	KY 74 east – Middlesboro	Eastern terminus; Kentucky state line
1.000 mi = 1.609 km; 1.000 km = 0.621 mi

== See also ==
- List of state routes in Tennessee
