= Kentucky Route 186 =

State highway in Kentucky, United States

Kentucky Route 186
- KY 186 highlighted in red

Route information
- Maintained by KYTC
- Length: 3.0 mi (4.8 km)

Major junctions
- South end: Fork Ridge Road (former SR 132) at the Tennessee state line north of Motch, Tennessee
- KY 3502 in Middlesboro
- North end: KY 74 / KY 1599 in Middlesboro

Location
- Country: United States
- State: Kentucky
- Counties: Bell

Highway system
- Kentucky State Highway System; Interstate; US; State; Parkways
← KY 185	→ KY 187

Kentucky Route 186 (KY 186) is a 3.0-mile-long (4.8 km) state highway in the U.S. state of Kentucky. The highway connects mostly rural areas of Bell County with Middlesboro.

== Route description ==
KY 186 begins at the Tennessee state line southwest of Middlesboro, within Bell County, where the roadway continues as Fork Ridge Road. It travels to the northeast, paralleling Bennetts Fork, and curves to the east-northeast to enter Middlesboro. It crosses over some railroad tracks and Yellow Creek. The highway has an intersection with the southern terminus of KY 3502 (Winchester Avenue). At this intersection, KY 74 Truck begins traveling concurrently with KY 186. The two highways travel north-northwest for two blocks. They both end at an intersection with KY 74 (West Cumberland Avenue). At this intersection, the roadway continues as KY 1599 (Airport Road).

== Major intersections ==
The entire route is in Bell County.

Location	mi	km	Destinations	Notes
	0.0	0.0	Fork Ridge Road south	Continuation beyond Tennessee state line; former Tennessee State Route 132
Middlesboro	2.7	4.3	KY 74 Truck east / KY 3502 north (Winchester Avenue)	Southern terminus of KY 3502; southern end of KY 74 Truck concurrency
Middlesboro	3.0	4.8	KY 74 (West Cumberland Avenue) / KY 74 Truck ends / KY 1599 (Airport Road)	Western terminus of KY 74 Truck; northern end of KY 74 Truck concurrency; southern terminus of KY 1599
1.000 mi = 1.609 km; 1.000 km = 0.621 mi: Concurrency terminus
