= Medford, Tennessee =

Medford
- Unincorporated community
- Location within the state of Tennessee Medford (the United States)
- Coordinates: 36°10′52″N 84°08′38″W
- Country: United States
- State: Tennessee
- County: Anderson
- Elevation: 922 ft (281 m)
- Time zone: UTC−5 (Eastern (EST))
  - Summer (DST): UTC−4 (EDT)
- ZIP Codes: 37769
- GNIS feature ID: 1293527

Medford is unincorporated community in Anderson County in the U.S. state of Tennessee.

Medford is located along U.S. Route 25W, south of Rocky Top and north of Clinton. Medford does not have a post office and uses the ZIP code for Rocky Top, 37769. The Medford area had a population of 1,602 in 2010.

== History ==
In 1904, the Louisville and Nashville Railroad came through the area and established a station named "Medford" after a family who lived near the station. In 1928, U.S. Route 25W was built through the community, which increased the population of Medford. The community had a school from around 1900 until 1989, when the school was sold and the students were transferred to Lake City Elementary School in Rocky Top.
