= Kentucky Route 441 =

State highway in Kentucky, United States

Kentucky Route 441
- KY 441 highlighted in red

Route information
- Maintained by KYTC
- Length: 4.897 mi (7.881 km)

Major junctions
- West end: KY 74 in Middlesboro
- KY 2402 in Middlesboro; KY 2079 in Middlesboro
- East end: US 25E in Middlesboro

Location
- Country: United States
- State: Kentucky
- Counties: Bell

Highway system
- Kentucky State Highway System; Interstate; US; State; Parkways
← KY 440	→ KY 442

Kentucky Route 441 (KY 441) is a 4.897-mile-long (7.881 km) state highway in the U.S. state of Kentucky. The highway travels through mostly urban areas of Bell County. Virtually the entire highway is within the city limits of Middlesboro.

== Route description ==
KY 441 begins at an intersection with KY 74 (West Cumberland Avenue) in the far western part of Middlesboro, within the south-central part of Bell County. It travels to the east-northeast, paralleling Stony Fork. It crosses over Beans Fork and intersects the northern terminus of KY 2396 (New Wilson Lane) and winds its way to the east. After it passes Hensley Cemetery and intersects the northern terminus of KY 1599 (Airport Road), it begins to parallel Yellow Creek. It then curves to the northeast. The highway crosses over Dunlap Hollow and curves to the north-northwest. It leaves the city limits of the city and curves to the north-northeast. KY 441 crosses over Stevenson Branch and Lick Fork. It curves to the northeast and re-enter the city limits of Middlesboro. It curves to the southeast and crosses over Fourmile Run. The highway then intersects the southern terminus of KY 3486 (Old Pineville Pike). At this intersection, KY 441 turns right, and travels to the south-southwest. It curves to the south and crosses over Yellow Creek. At an intersection with the northern terminus of KY 2402 (North 25th Street), it turns to the left and travels to the east-northeast. After curving to the east-southeast, it intersects the northern terminus of KY 2079 (19th Street). The highway crosses over some railroad tracks of CSX and then crosses over Yellow Creek again. It travels just south of Greenhills Cemetery and meets its eastern terminus, an intersection with U.S. Route 25E (US 25E; 12th Street / Pineville Road). Here, the roadway continues as Happy Hollow Road.

== Major intersections ==
The entire route is in Middlesboro, Bell County.

mi	km	Destinations	Notes
0.000	0.000	KY 74 (West Cumberland Avenue)	Western terminus
0.791	1.273	KY 2396 south (New Wilson Lane)	Northern terminus of KY 2396
1.563	2.515	KY 1599 south (Airport Road)	Northern terminus of KY 1599
3.827	6.159	KY 3486 north (Old Pineville Pike)	Southern terminus of KY 3486
4.257	6.851	KY 2402 south (North 25th Street)	Northern terminus of KY 2402
4.526	7.284	KY 2079 south	Northern terminus of KY 2079
4.897	7.881	US 25E (12th Street / Pineville Road) – Pineville	Eastern terminus
1.000 mi = 1.609 km; 1.000 km = 0.621 mi
