= Kentucky Route 727 =

State highway in Kentucky, United States

Kentucky Route 727
- KY 727 highlighted in red

Route information
- Maintained by KYTC
- Length: 4.580 mi (7.371 km)

Major junctions
- South end: US 25W near Corbin
- North end: US 25W in Corbin

Location
- Country: United States
- State: Kentucky
- Counties: Whitley

Highway system
- Kentucky State Highway System; Interstate; US; State; Parkways
← KY 726	→ KY 728

Kentucky Route 727 (KY 727) is a 4.580-mile-long (7.371 km) state highway in Whitley County, Kentucky, that runs from U.S. Route 25W (US 25W) southwest of Corbin to US 25W in downtown Corbin.

== Major intersections ==
The entire route is in Whitley County.

Location	mi	km	Destinations	Notes
	0.000	0.000	US 25W (Cumberland Falls Highway) / Corinth Road	Southern terminus; continues as Corinth Road beyond US 25W
	1.439	2.316	KY 3421 north (Barton Cutoff Road)	Southern terminus of KY 3421
Scuffletown	2.436	3.920	KY 1259 north (Oak Grove Church Road)	Southern end of KY 1259 overlap
	2.753	4.431	KY 1259 south (Scuffletown Road)	Northern end of KY 1259 overlap
Corbin	3.756	6.045	KY 1259 south (Stamper Street)	Northern terminus of KY 1259
Corbin	4.528– 4.580	7.287– 7.371	US 25W (Kentucky Street / Main Street) / East Fifth Street	Northern terminus; continues as East Fifth Street beyond US 25W
1.000 mi = 1.609 km; 1.000 km = 0.621 mi: Concurrency terminus
