= Cove Lake State Park =

State park in Tennessee, United States

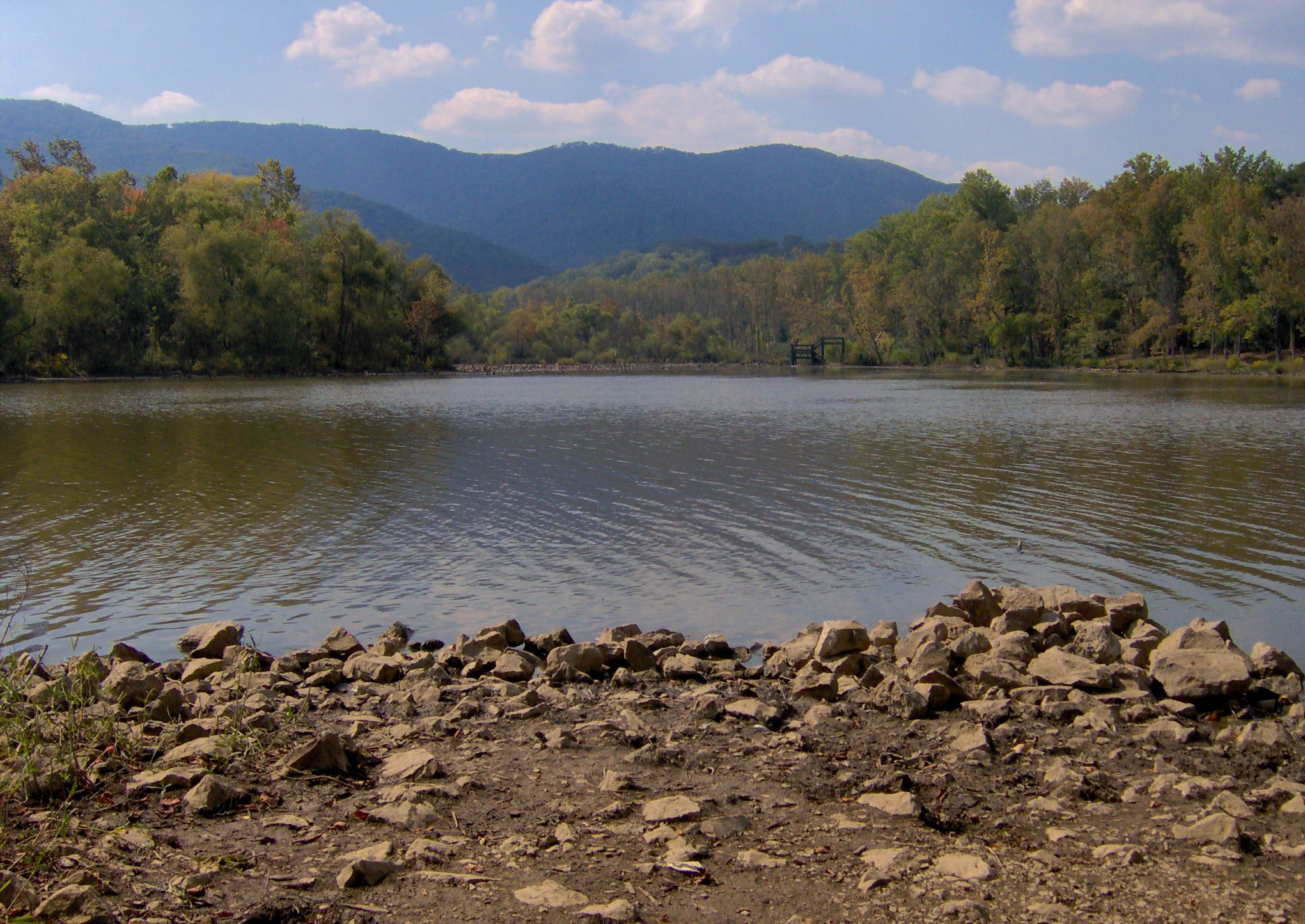
- Cove Lake
- Interactive map of Cove Lake State Park
- Type: Tennessee State Park
- Location: Caryville, Campbell County, Tennessee
- Coordinates: 36.30904°N 84.21106°W
- Area: 673 acres (2.72 km^{2})
- Created: 1937
- Operator: Tennessee Department of Environment and Conservation
- Website: Cove Lake State Park

Cove Lake State Park is a state park in Campbell County, Tennessee, in the southeastern United States. The park consists of 673 acres (2.72 km^{2}) situated around Cove Lake, an impoundment of Cove Creek created by the completion of Caryville Dam in 1936. The park's location is in the town of Caryville and west of Jacksboro.

Cove Lake is an extension of the much larger Norris Reservoir, which extends across the lower 15 miles (24 km) of Cove Creek downstream from Caryville Dam. Cove Lake State Park was one of several state and local parks developed in the 1930s as part of the Norris Dam Project. The park includes a large campground, several small walking trails, and a wildlife observation area. A leg of the Cumberland Trail passes near the park's northern boundary, connecting the park to nearby mountaintops.

== Geographical setting ==
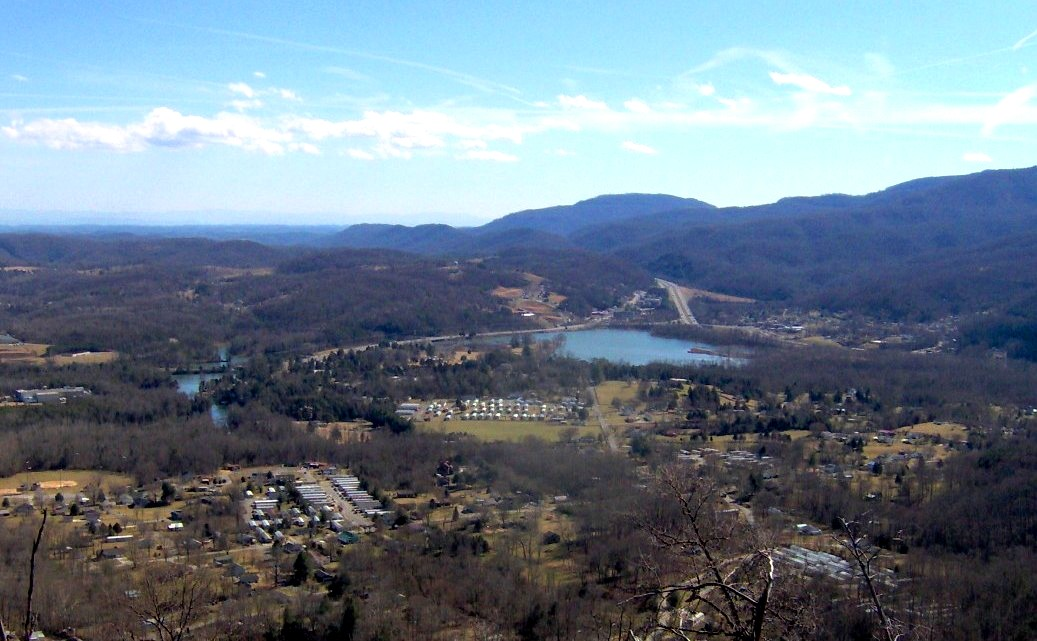
Cove Lake and Caryville, viewed from Devil's Racetrack

Cove Lake State Park is located at the western end of Powell Valley, a 50-mile (80 km) valley dividing the Cumberland Mountains to the north and west from the Appalachian Ridge-and-Valley range to south and east. Cross Mountain— which at 3,534 feet (1,077 m) is the highest mountain in Tennessee west of the Blue Ridge Mountains— dominates the view to the west. The southern tip of Fork Mountain overlooks the park immediately to the north. Cumberland Mountain, a narrow ridge that spans the entire northern rim of Powell Valley, stretches nearly 40 miles (64 km) between Bruce Gap (just north of Cove Lake) and Cumberland Gap to the northeast. Cumberland Mountain's rocky western tip, known as Devil's Racetrack, is visible from most anywhere in the park.

Cove Creek rises in the mountains to the northwest (near the community of Pioneer) and flows southeastward for roughly 25 miles (40 km) before emptying into the Clinch River just north of Norris Dam. Caryville Dam spans the creek approximately 16 miles (26 km) upstream from the creek's mouth. The lake created by the dam spans a 2-mile (3.2 km) stretch of Cove Creek upstream from the dam and a 1-mile (1.6 km) stretch of the creek's Dog Creek tributary to form a U-shape around the park. The entire lake covers roughly 210 acres (0.85 km^{2}).

Interstate 75 passes along the western boundary of the park, connecting the area to Kentucky to the north and Knoxville to the south. U.S. Route 25W passes through the southern and eastern sections of the park, connecting it with Caryville to the west and the Norris Dam area to the east.

== History ==
=== Early history ===
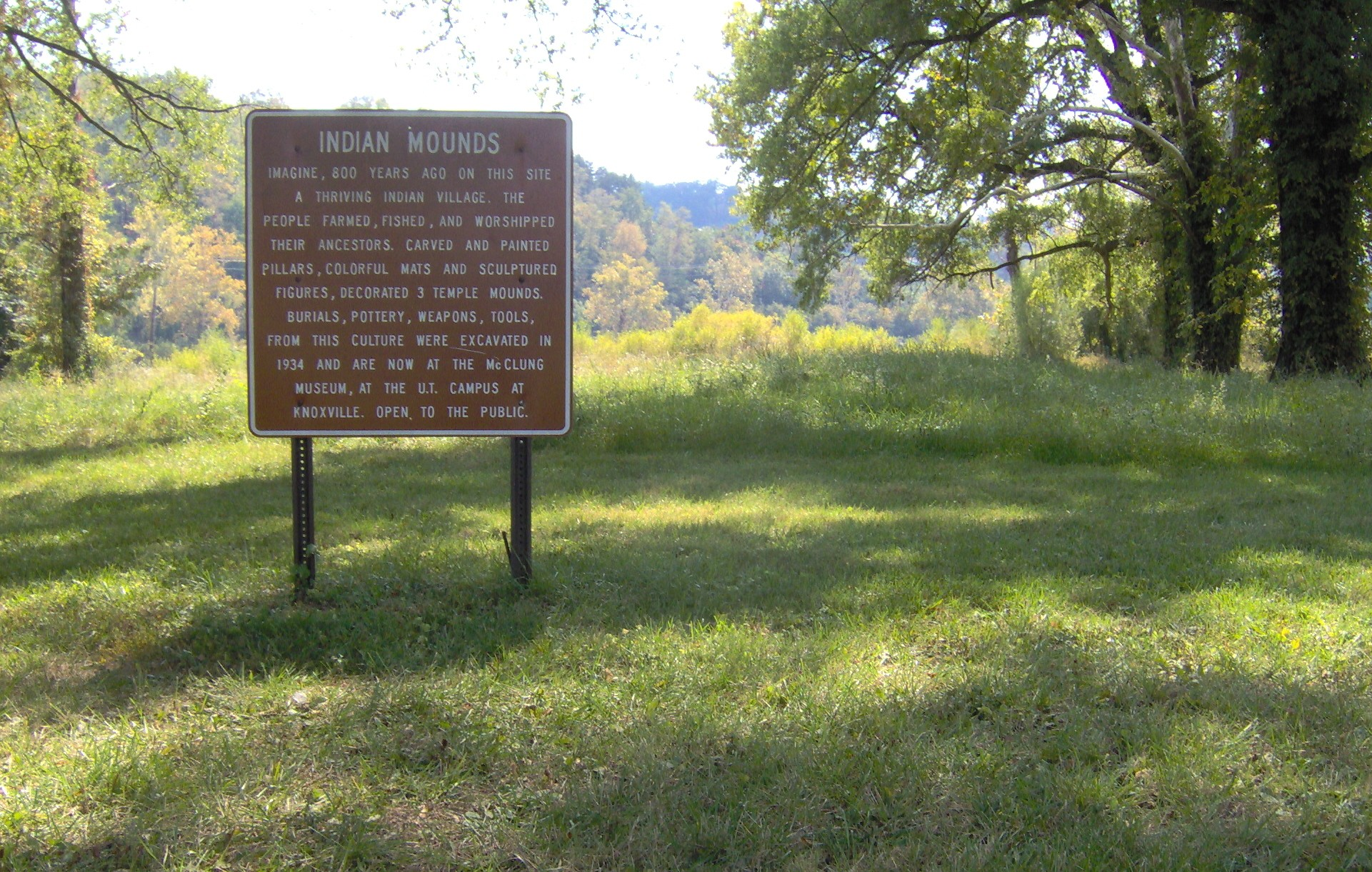
Sign marking the Irvin Mound Site on the shores of Cove Lake

Archaeological excavations in the 1930s uncovered evidence of a Mississippian period (c. 1000–1500) Native American village near where US-25W now crosses Cove Lake, along the park's southern boundary. The site, known as the Irvin Mound Site, consisted of a large mound surrounded by a village that covered nearly 15 acres (0.061 km^{2}) at its greatest extent. Researchers determined that houses in the village were made of small upright logs posted in trenches and lashed together using cane and grass. Several human burials, various pottery fragments, and tools and weapons made from stone, antler, and bone were uncovered at the site.

Euro-American settlers first arrived in Powell Valley in the early 19th century. The community of Wheelerville was established as a railroad stop in 1867, but by 1880 had changed its name to "Caryville" after a local family. Most of the early settlers were subsistence farmers, although large-scale logging operations moved into the area in the late 19th century. In the 1890s, coal mining operations sprang up along the base of Cross Mountain, namely at Coal Creek (modern Lake City) and Briceville a few miles to the south. The Stone Mill, a gristmill and sawmill built by Joel Stone around 1900, served as a community center and base for local business until it was purchased as part of the Norris Project in 1934.

=== Norris Project ===
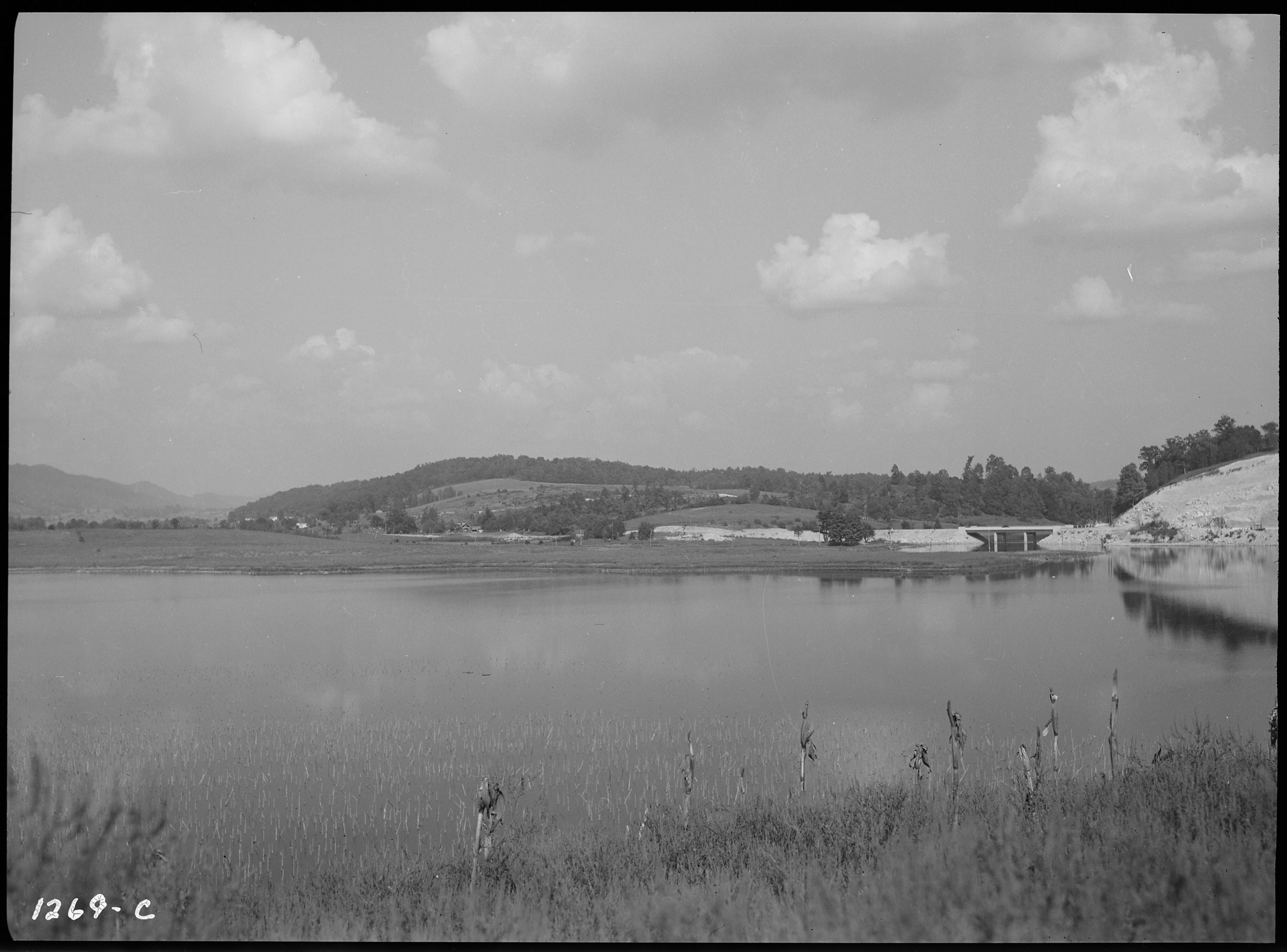
Caryville Lake in 1936

In the 1920s, several groups began lobbying state and federal legislators for the construction of a dam at the confluence of the Clinch River and Cove Creek to control flooding and provide electricity to the area. The project was initially known as the "Cove Creek Project," but after the Tennessee Valley Authority assumed control of the project in 1933, it became known as the "Norris Project." The project was named for Nebraska senator George Norris, who had advocated the creation of TVA in the early 1930s. The construction of Norris Dam began in 1934 and the dam's gates were closed in 1936, effectively creating the Norris Reservoir.

The Tennessee Valley Authority also constructed Caryville Dam to form Cove Lake. Several of the town's structures were condemned or moved, and two highways had to be rerouted. TVA planned Cove Lake State Park as one of the Norris Project's three demonstration recreational areas, the other two being Norris Dam State Park and Big Ridge State Park along the main reservoir to the east.

The Civilian Conservation Corps began work on Cove Lake State Park in 1937. The CCC built the park office, restaurant, several stone cabins, a boat dock, park roads, and shelters, of which the park office and part of the restaurant are still standing. In 1950, the park was deeded to the state of Tennessee, which has since added more modern facilities.

== The park today ==
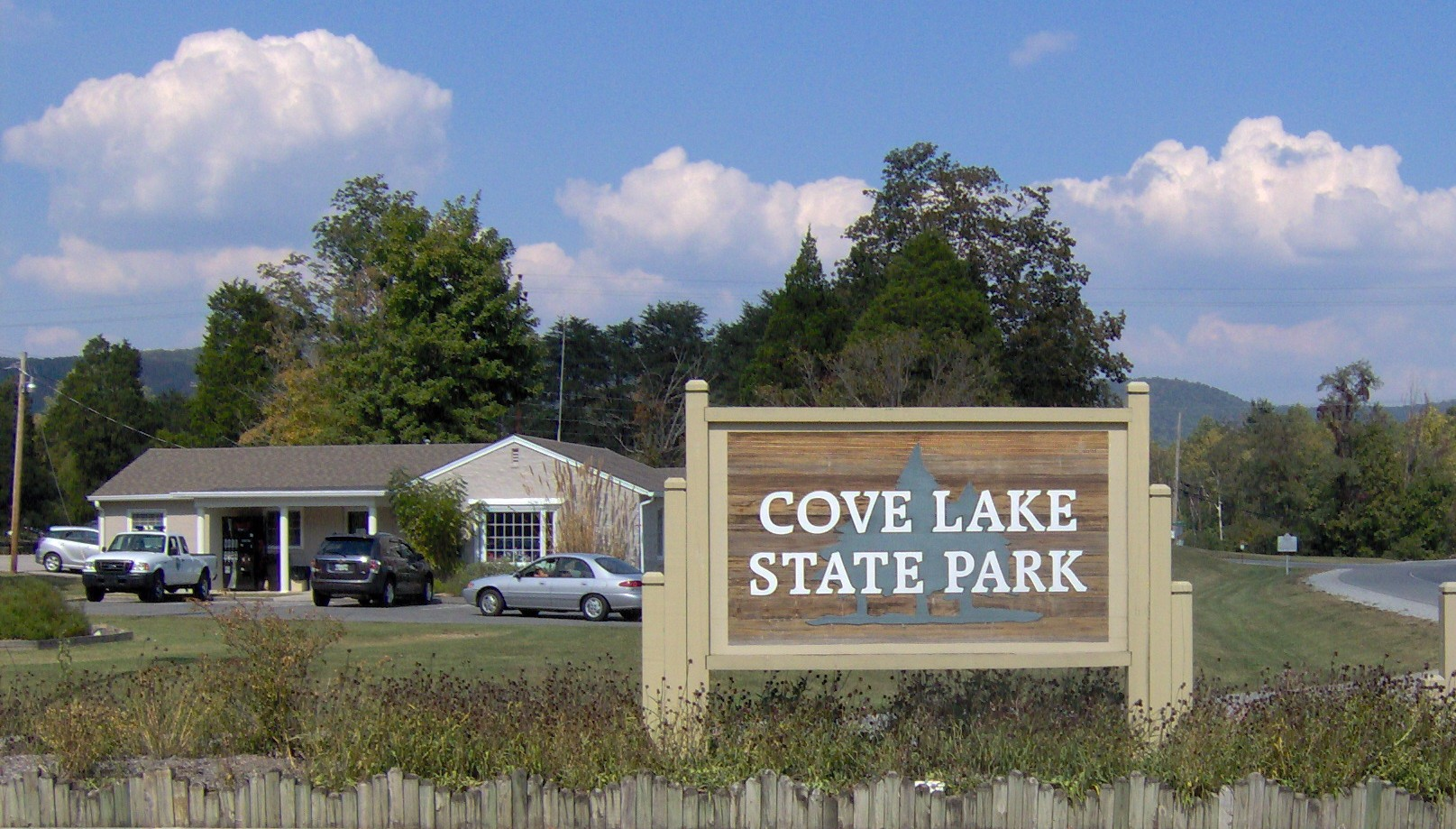
Park entrance

Cove Lake State Park maintains a 106-site campground, an indoor pavilion, a restaurant, and several athletic fields and courts. Several small walking trails meander through the park, including a 3.5-mile (5.6 km) paved trail that follows the lakeshore and a trail that provides access to Wheeler Cemetery and Caryville Dam on the east side of US-25W. The park's wildlife observation area is located at the northwest section of the park and includes a 15-foot (4.6 m) observation tower.

When completed, the Cumberland Trail will connect Cumberland Gap at the Tennessee-Virginia-Kentucky border with Prentice Cooper State Forest near the Tennessee-Georgia border. The first 47 miles (76 km) of the trail, known as the Cumberland Mountain Segment, will traverse the crest of Cumberland Mountain, connecting Cumberland Gap and Cove Lake State Park. At present, an 11-mile (18 km) section of the Cumberland Mountain Segment is complete, and connects Cove Lake State Park with Tank Springs in LaFollette. The second segment of the trail, the 36-mile (58 km) Smoky Mountain Segment (named after a mountain in the Cumberlands, not to be confused with the Great Smoky Mountains), will connect Cove Lake State Park with Frozen Head State Park. Cove Lake State Park's Cumberland Trail access point is located along Bruce Gap Road, at the park's northern boundary. Going east from this access point, the trail leads up the flanks of Fork Mountain before crossing Bruce Creek and ascending to Devil's Racetrack. Going west, the trail passes under I-75 and ascends Cross Mountain en route to interior of the Cumberland Mountains.

== Photo gallery ==
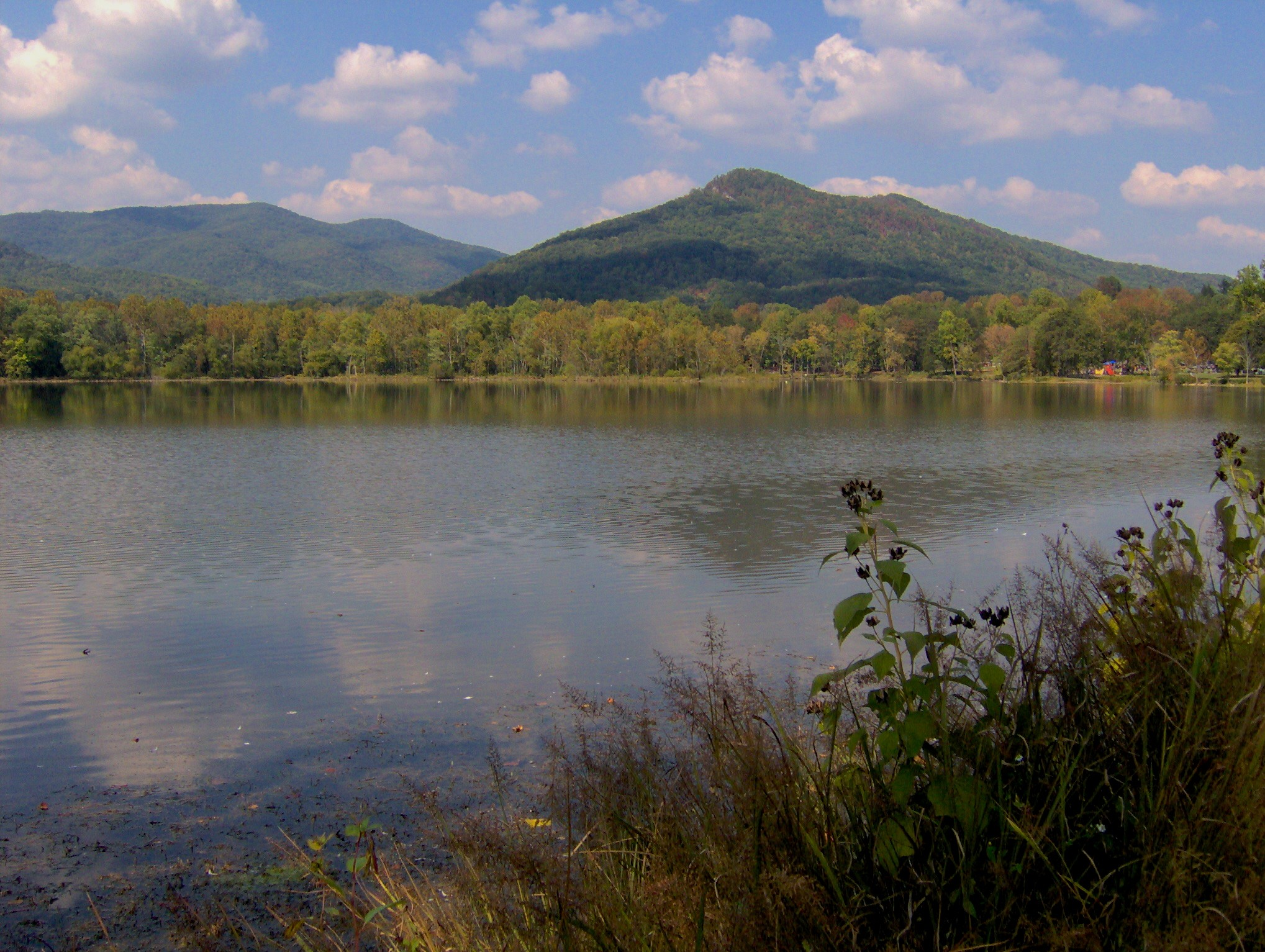
Looking across Cove Lake to Fork Mountain

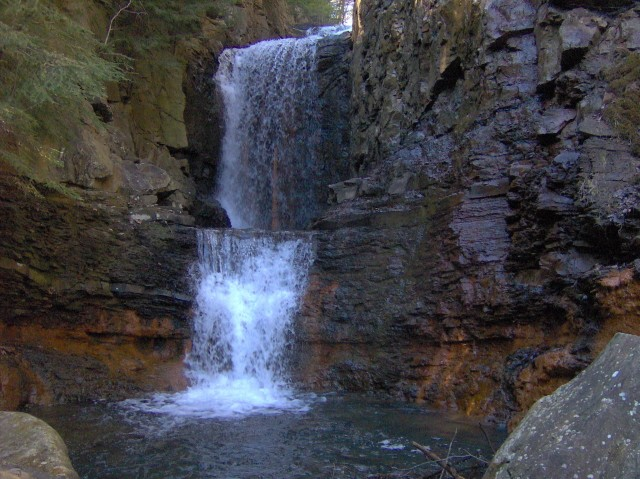
Bruce Creek Falls on the Cumberland Trail

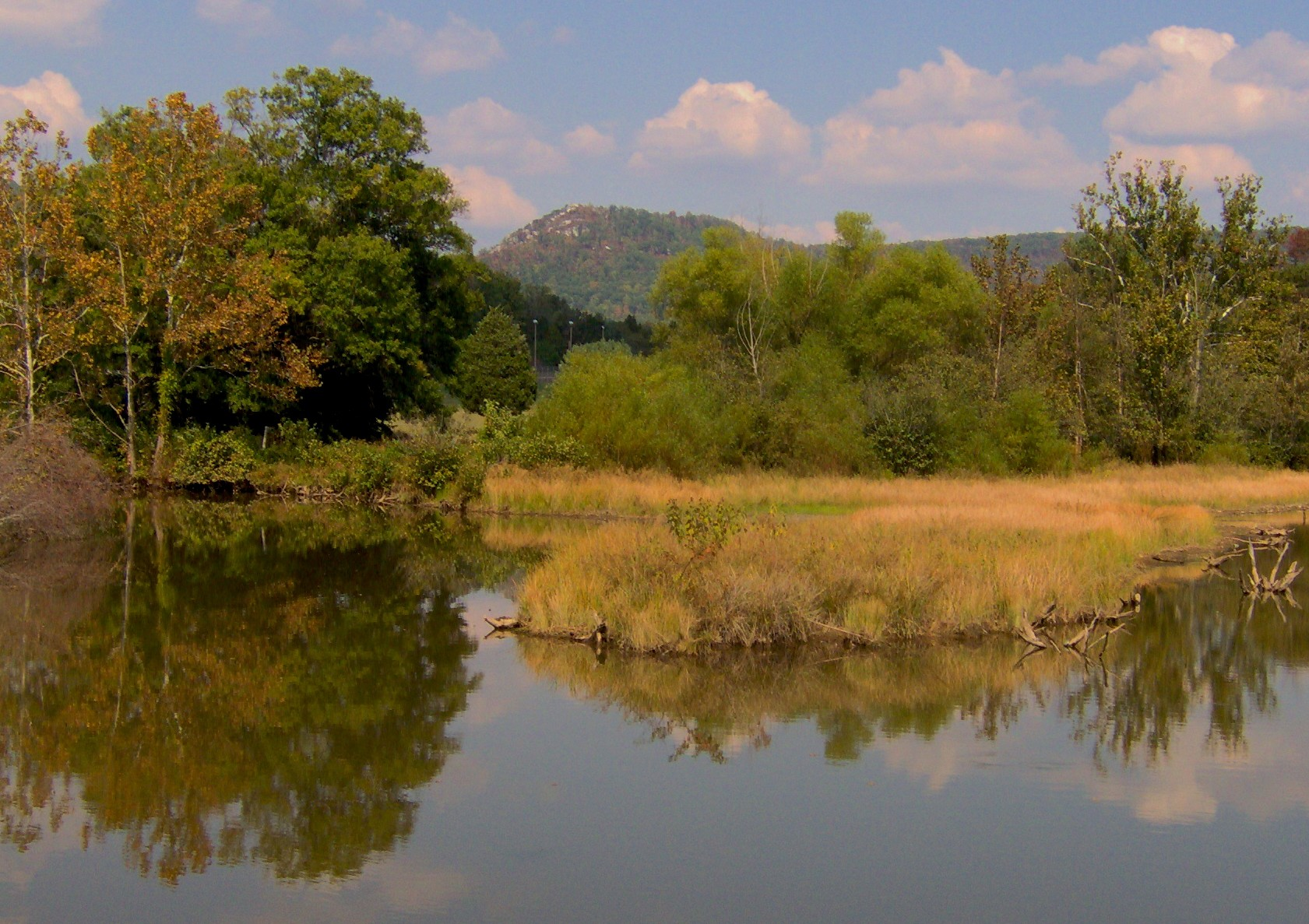
An inlet along Cove Lake, with Devil's Racetrack rising in the distance

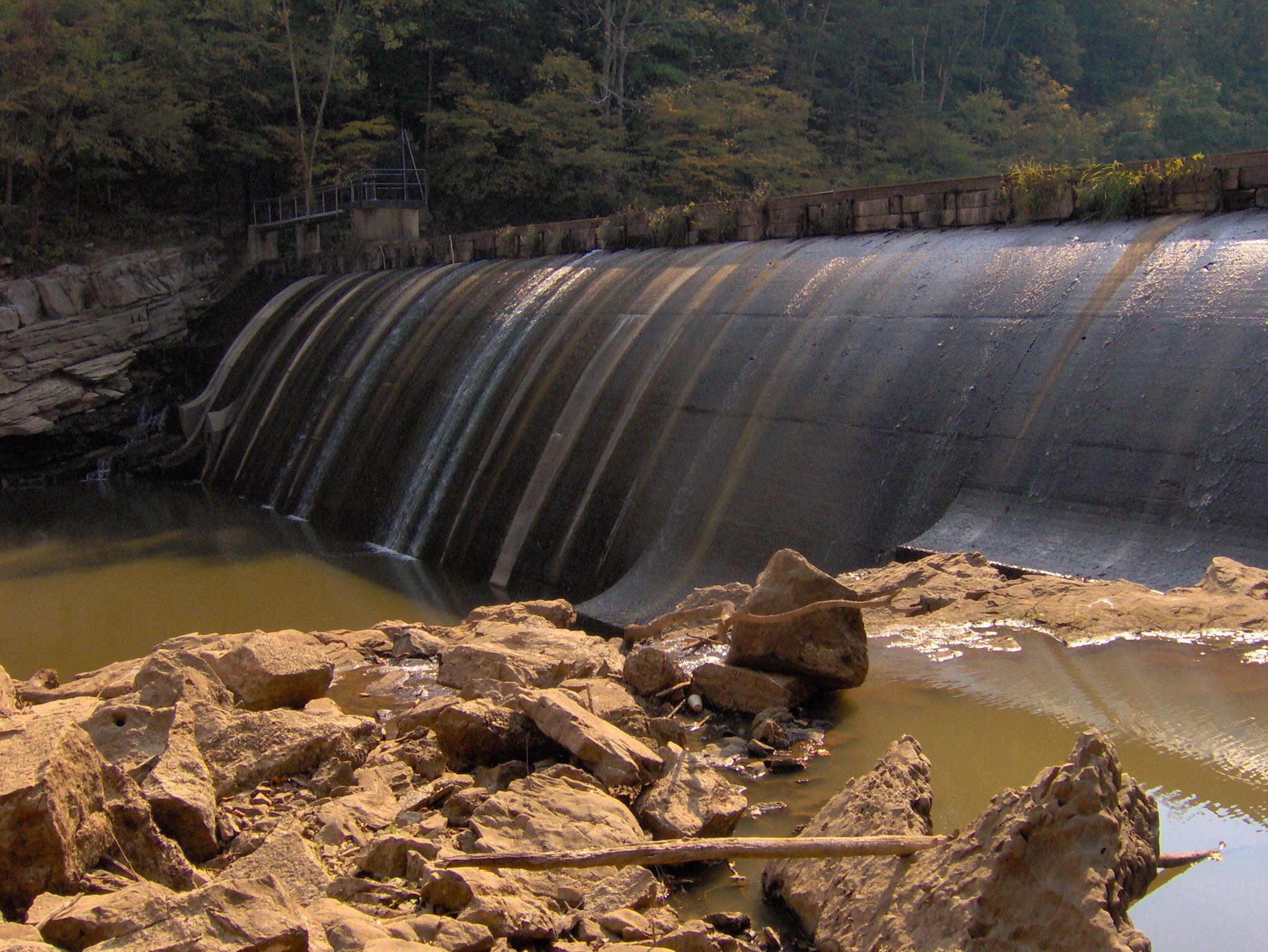
Caryville Dam
