= Knoxville Center Mall =

Mall in Knoxville, Tennessee

Coordinates: 36.03284°N 83.87662°W

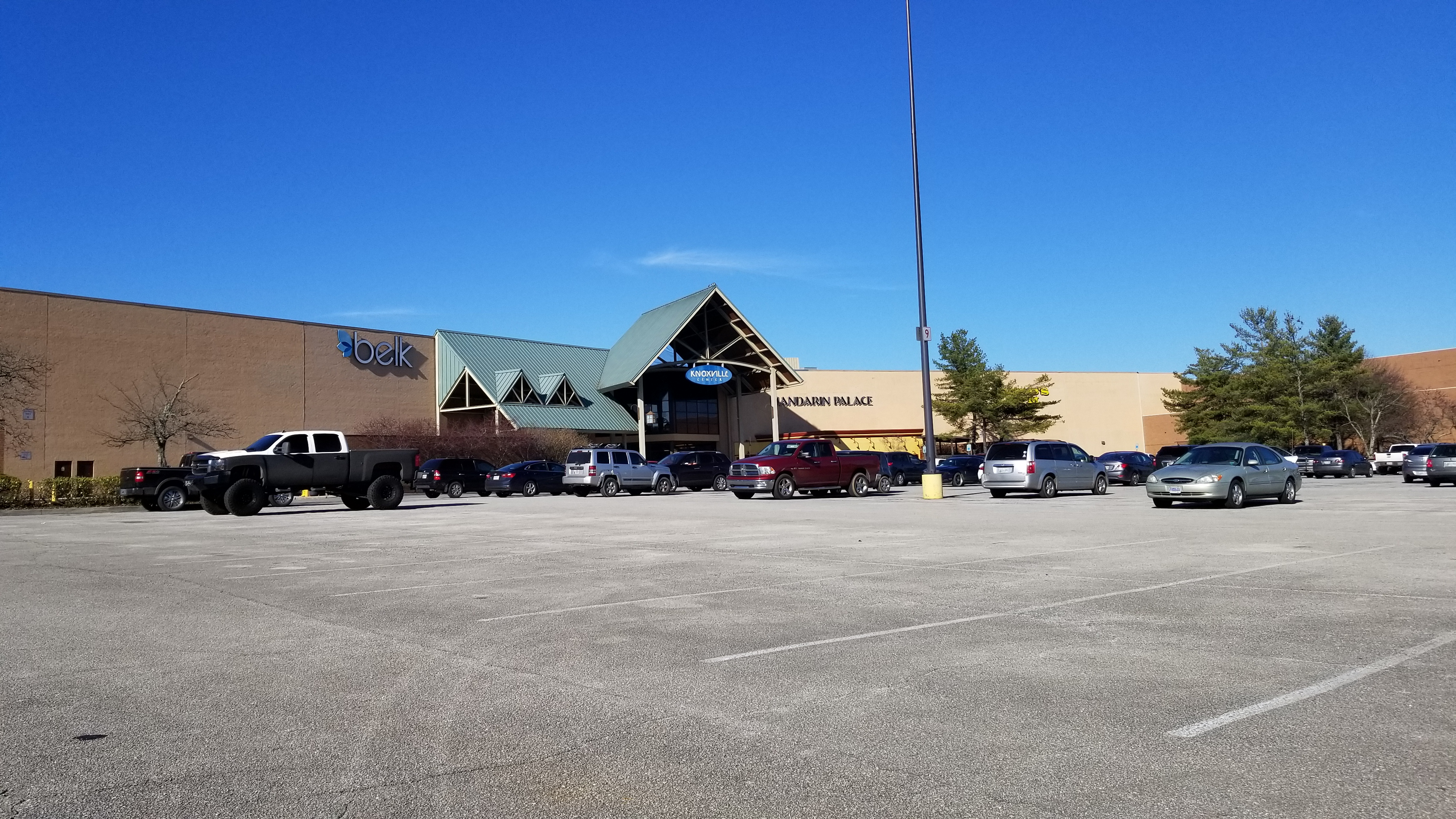
- Exterior view of Knoxville Center Mall, March 2018
- Location: 3001 Knoxville Center Drive, near exit 8 on Interstate 640, Knoxville, Tennessee, United States
- Opened: July 29, 1984
- Closed: January 31, 2020
- Manager: Knoxville Partners LLC
- Owner: Knoxville Partners LLC
- Num. of stores: 0
- Num. of anchor tenants: 5 (all vacant)
- Floor area: 964,000 ft^{2} (89,600 m^{2}) (GLA)
- Floors: 2

Knoxville Center Mall, originally known as East Towne Mall, was a shopping mall located in the eastern part of Knoxville, Tennessee Knoxville, Tennessee. It was in operation from 1984 to January 2020 and was demolished in 2021.

== History ==
In 1984, East Towne Mall opened along Interstate 640 in a rapidly growing area The mall featured anchors such as Miller's, JCPenney, Sears, Profitts, and Service Merchandise, along with a junior anchor, Regal Cinemas. On October 16, 1998, a Sam's Club opened within the mall's southeast outlot area.

In 1997, the mall underwent a significant renovation led by Simon Property Group. The exterior was retained, but a new entrance was introduced. The interior received upgrades with new tile, paint, trim, and a distinctive Tennessee mountain theme. Following the renovation, the mall was rebranded as Knoxville Center Mall.

Miller's transitioned to Hess's in 1988. However, after being acquired by Profitts, Hess's eventually closed down. Despite Profitts operating a store at the mall at that time, they chose not to maintain a dual anchor. In 1992, they sold the anchor to Dillard's, which opened a store in place of Hess's at the mall. Service Merchandise closed in 1999 and reopened as Rush Fitness, later becoming Gold's Gym.

In 2005, Belk acquired Proffitts, resulting in the store becoming Belk. On May 29, 2008, Dillard's, facing declining sales, announced closure, effective September 2008. In 2016, the mall changed ownership to Knoxville Partners LLC, By August 2017, Knoxville Partners LLC had changed the name of the mall back to East Towne Mall. Signage at the mall remained unchanged, and the mall was still marketed as Knoxville Center Mall. JCPenney closed on September 17, 2017, and Sears followed suit on September 2, 2018. By October 2019, the mall had dwindled to 12 stores, a dentist's office, an event center, and two restaurants. Belk, the largest remaining store, closed on November 16, 2019.

On October 31, 2019, the owners declared the mall's complete closure, with all leases terminating on January 31, 2020. The Regal Cinema theater unexpectedly closed the same day as the closure announcement. Despite plans to transform the mall into a mixed-use facility, including office space, retail, dining, and entertainment, the decline persisted. The mall ceased operations on January 31, 2020.

As of September 2020, property ownership was shared among the corporate parents of Dillard's and Belk, along with TF Knoxville TN LLC and Millertown Pavilion LLC. In September 2020, Hillwood Enterprises sought rezoning for the 78-acre mall site to construct an e-commerce fulfillment center for Amazon, with an estimated redevelopment cost of $70 million. The demolition of the mall began in April 2021 and was completed later that year. The Amazon Fulfillment Center, DNA6, opened for service on the former mall site in August 2024.

== Services ==
East Towne Mall opened with a food court in the center of the mall located on the upper level of the Center Court. By October 2019, the food court only had one restaurant, which was a Chinese takeout. There was also a Chinese buffet on the lower level. The food court was located directly next to the 10-screen Regal Cinemas location.
