= Caryville, Tennessee =

- Town
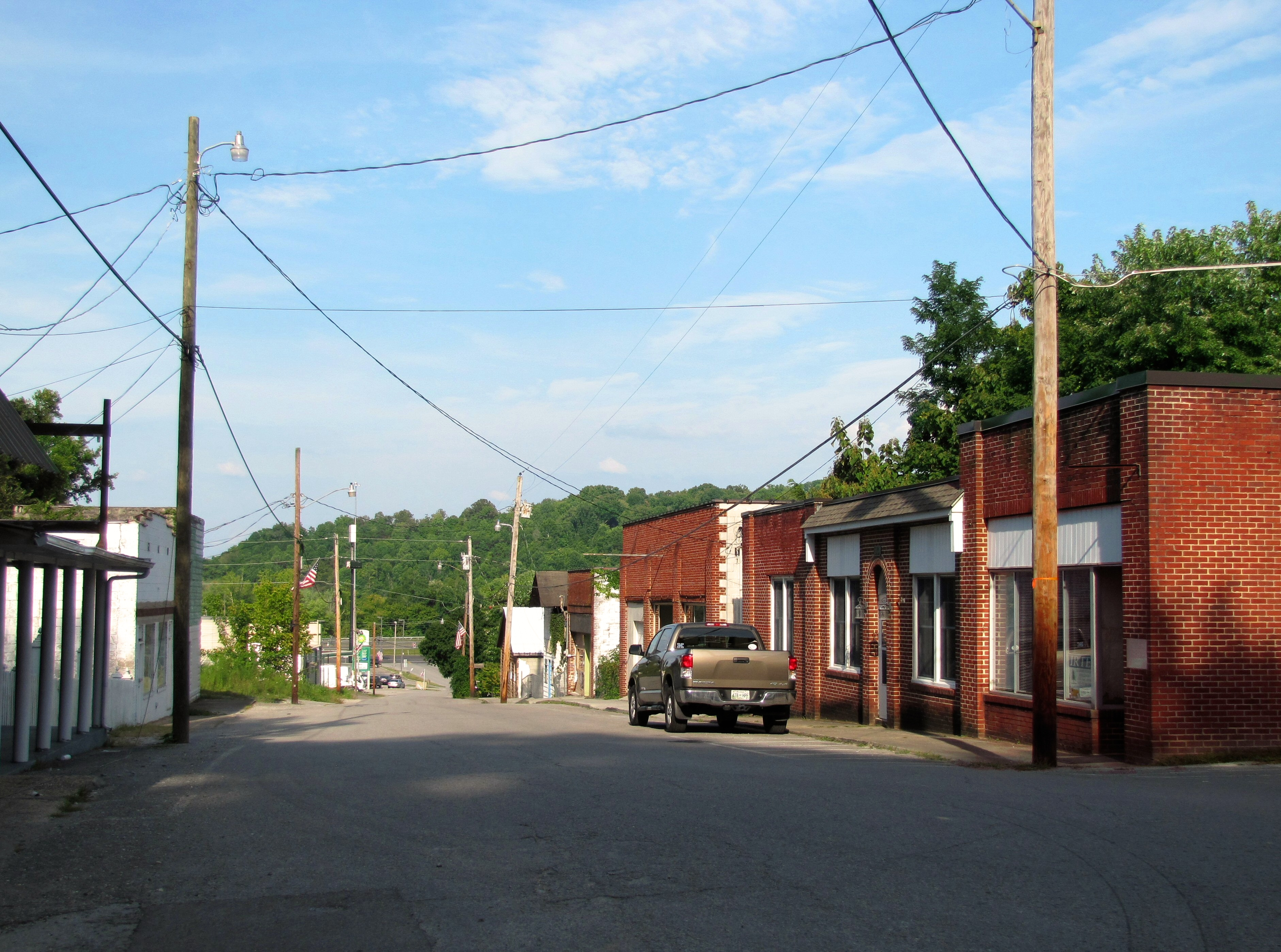
- Main Street in Caryville

- Location of Caryville in Campbell County, Tennessee.
- Coordinates: 36°19′12″N 84°12′58″W
- Country: United States
- State: Tennessee
- County: Campbell

Area
  - Total: 5.83 sq mi (15.10 km^{2})
  - Land: 5.56 sq mi (14.39 km^{2})
  - Water: 0.27 sq mi (0.71 km^{2})
- Elevation: 1,093 ft (333 m)

Population (2020)
  - Total: 2,212
  - Density: 398/sq mi (153.7/km^{2})
- Time zone: UTC-5 (Eastern (EST))
  - Summer (DST): UTC-4 (EDT)
- ZIP code: 37714, 37756, 37847
- Area code: 423
- FIPS code: 47-11360
- GNIS feature ID: 1279837
- Website: Official website

Caryville is a town in Campbell County, Tennessee, United States. As of the 2020 census, Caryville had a population of 2,212.

== History ==
Originally known as Wheeler's Station, the town was renamed in honor of Judge William Carey, a prominent local landowner, in 1866.

== Geography ==
Caryville is situated in a valley between Cross Mountain to the west and a series of rugged hills to the east. Cove Lake State Park lies immediately north of the town, and includes an artificial lake created by the impoundment of Cove Creek by Caryville Dam. Two major federal highways, Interstate 75 and U.S. Route 25W, intersect in Caryville.

According to the United States Census Bureau, the town has a total area of 5.5 square miles (14 km^{2}), of which, 5.2 square miles (13 km^{2}) of it is land and 0.2 square miles (0.52 km^{2}) of it (4.58%) is water.

== Demographics ==
Historical population
Census	Pop.	Note	%±
1880	212		—
1970	648		—
1980	2,039		214.7%
1990	1,751		−14.1%
2000	2,243		28.1%
2010	2,297		2.4%
2020	2,212		−3.7%

=== 2020 census ===
Caryville racial composition
Race	Number	Percentage
White (non-Hispanic)	2,091	94.53%
Black or African American (non-Hispanic)	3	0.14%
Native American	5	0.23%
Asian	7	0.32%
Other/Mixed	76	3.44%
Hispanic or Latino	30	1.36%

As of the 2020 United States census, there were 2,212 people, 925 households, and 653 families residing in the town.

=== 2000 census ===
As of the census of 2000, there were 2,243 people, 897 households, and 644 families residing in the town. The population density was 431.0 inhabitants per square mile (166.4/km^{2}). There were 999 housing units at an average density of 192.0 per square mile (74.1/km^{2}). The racial makeup of the town was 97.15% White, 0.27% African American, 0.53% Native American, 0.27% Asian, 0.18% Pacific Islander, 0.76% from other races, and 0.85% from two or more races. Hispanic or Latino of any race were 2.50% of the population.

There were 897 households, out of which 33.2% had children under the age of 18 living with them, 54.7% were married couples living together, 12.8% had a female householder with no husband present, and 28.2% were non-families. 24.5% of all households were made up of individuals, and 11.5% had someone living alone who was 65 years of age or older. The average household size was 2.50 and the average family size was 2.95.

In the town, the population was spread out, with 24.5% under the age of 18, 9.1% from 18 to 24, 31.1% from 25 to 44, 22.5% from 45 to 64, and 12.8% who were 65 years of age or older. The median age was 35 years. For every 100 females, there were 96.1 males. For every 100 females age 18 and over, there were 94.5 males.

The median income for a household in the town was $28,307, and the median income for a family was $32,604. Males had a median income of $25,094 versus $19,500 for females. The per capita income for the town was $14,452. About 14.6% of families and 17.0% of the population were below the poverty line, including 23.7% of those under age 18 and 14.7% of those age 65 or over.

== Economy ==
Caryville's economy consists mostly of restaurants, hotels and motels along the town's two exits (134 and 141) of Interstate 75.

Cove Lake State Park located in the town limits also provides revenue for the town.
