= Eagan, Tennessee =

- Unincorporated community
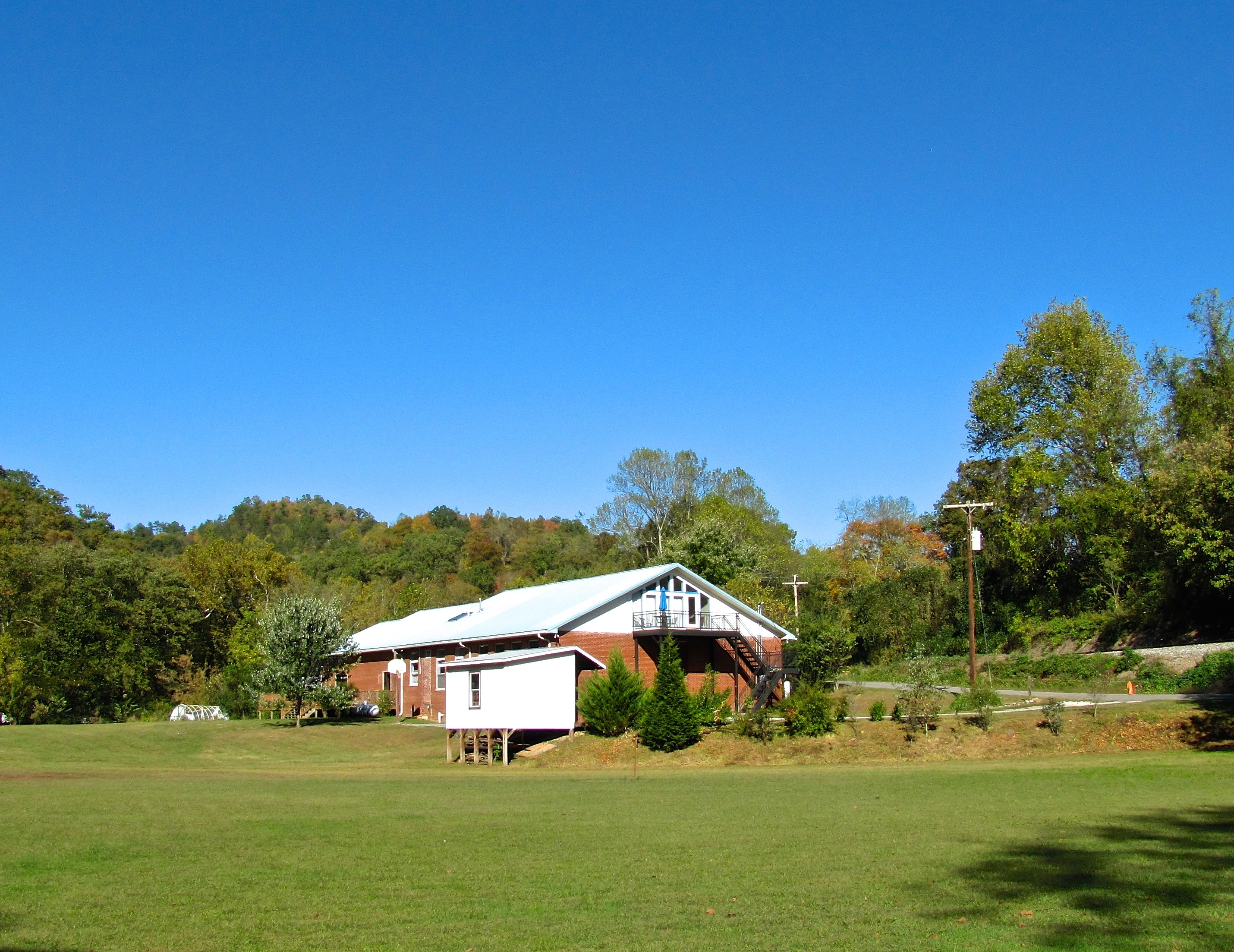
- Clearfork Community Institute

- Location within Tennessee Location within the United States
- Coordinates: 36°33′07″N 83°58′37″W
- Country: United States
- State: Tennessee
- County: Claiborne; Campbell
- Elevation: 1,089 ft (332 m)
- Time zone: UTC-5 (Eastern (EST))
  - Summer (DST): UTC-4 (EDT)
- ZIP code: 37730
- Area code: 423
- GNIS feature ID: 1283282

Eagan is an unincorporated community in Claiborne County and Campbell County, Tennessee, in the Cumberland Mountains of the southeastern United States. It lies along State Route 90 just west of Clairfield in the Clearfork Valley. A former coal mining town, Eagan was likely named for either a mining company official or a minister. The Eagan Mountain (King Mountain) surface coal mine, operated by Mountainside Coal Company, is located in Claiborne County near Eagan.

Eagan is home to several small business, churches, and a community center, the Clearfork Community Institute. It also has its own post office, with ZIP code 37730.
