= Pruden, Kentucky and Tennessee =

Unincorporated community in Kentucky, United States

Pruden
- Unincorporated community
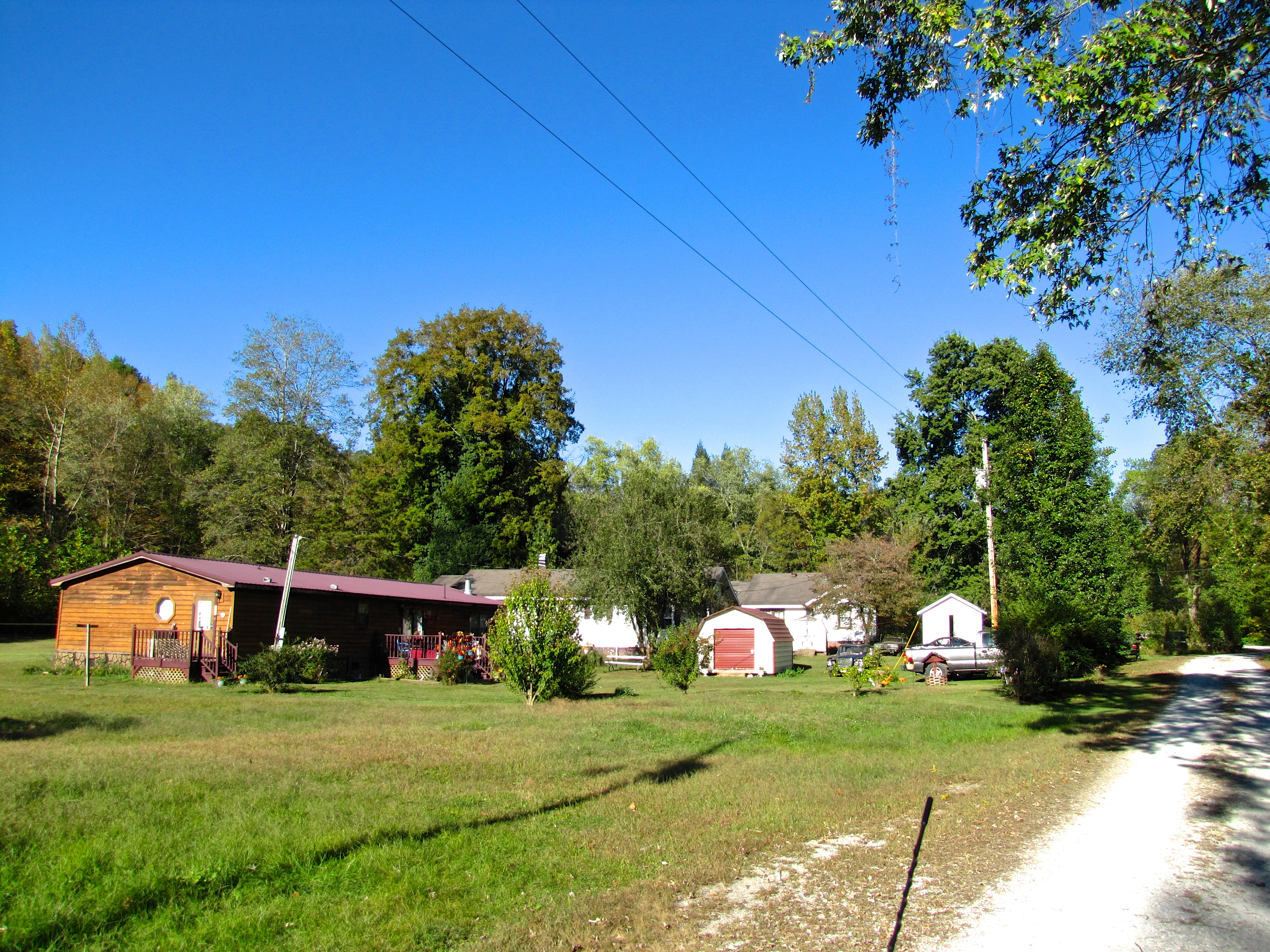
- Houses along Pruden Road

- Location on Kentucky–Tennessee border Pruden (the United States)
- Coordinates: 36°35′10″N 83°54′04″W
- Country: United States
- States: Kentucky and Tennessee
- County: Bell (Kentucky) and Claiborne (Tennessee)
- Elevation: 1,266 ft (386 m)
- Time zone: UTC-5 (Eastern (EST))
  - Summer (DST): UTC-4 (EDT)
- ZIP code: 37851
- GNIS feature ID: 1310724

Pruden is an unincorporated community located partly in Bell County, Kentucky and partly in Claiborne County, Tennessee, in the southeastern United States. It is located along Tennessee State Route 90 and Kentucky Route 74, which intersect at the state line, in the upper Clearfork Valley.

== History ==
Pruden had a post office on the Tennessee side of the border from September 20, 1906, to May 21, 2011; it still has its own ZIP code, 37851.

== Images ==
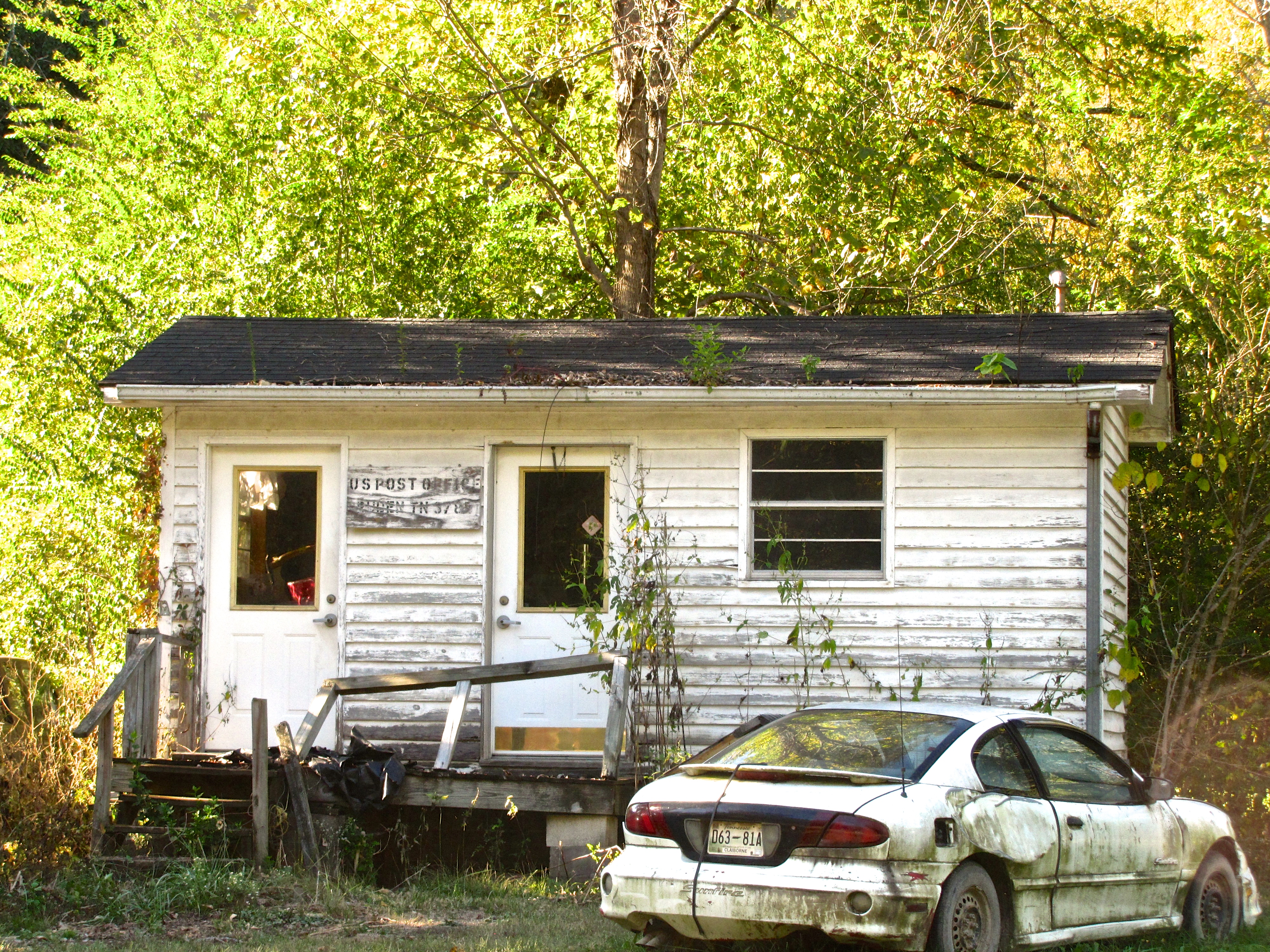
The now abandoned post office in Pruden
