= Clairfield, Tennessee =

- Unincorporated community
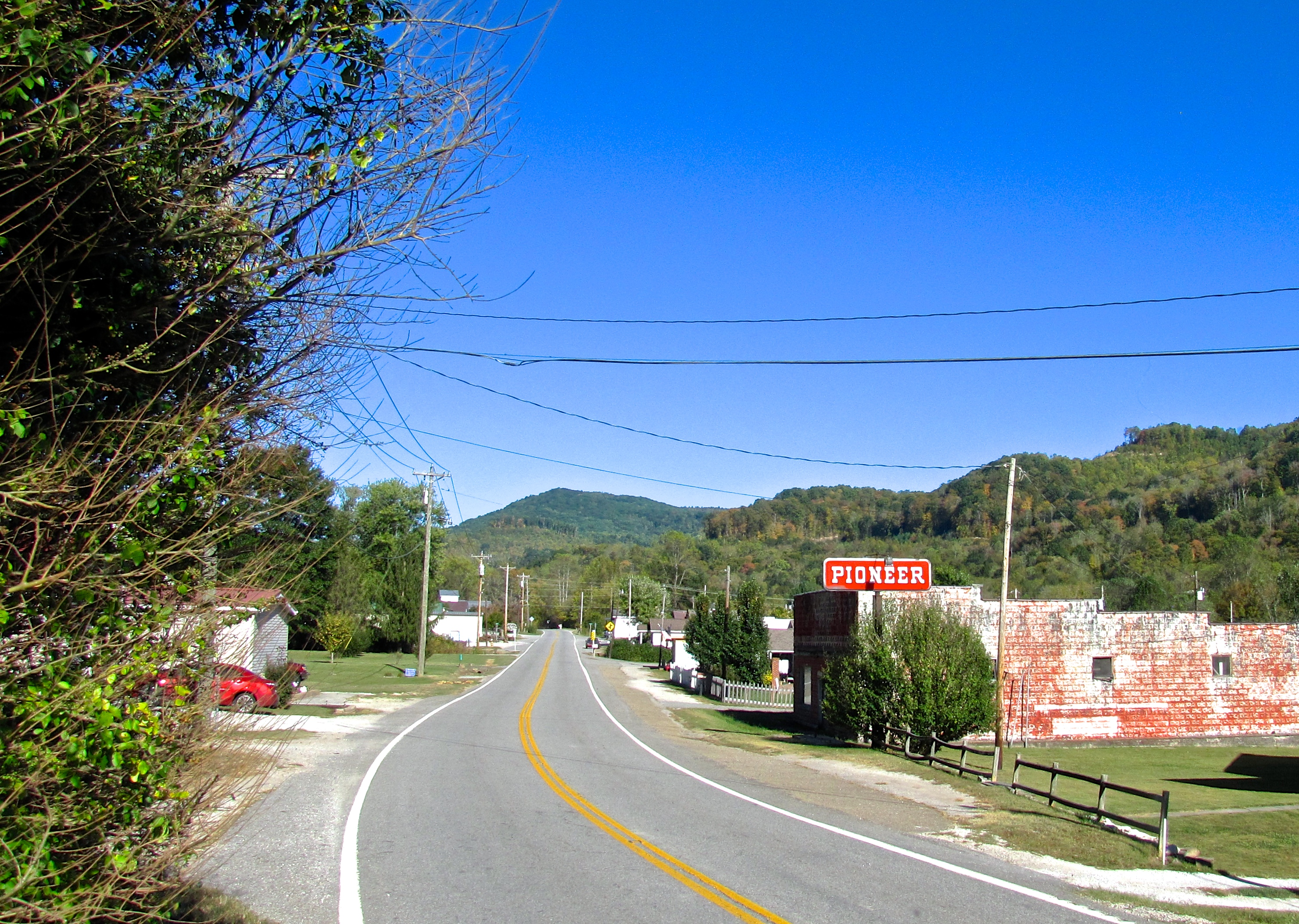
- SR 90 in Clairfield

- Location within Tennessee Location within the United States
- Coordinates: 36°33′00″N 83°57′00″W
- Country: United States
- State: Tennessee
- County: Claiborne
- Elevation: 1,112 ft (339 m)
- Time zone: UTC-5 (Eastern (EST))
  - Summer (DST): UTC-4 (EDT)
- ZIP code: 37715
- Area code: 423
- GNIS feature ID: 1280581

Clairfield is an unincorporated community in Claiborne County, Tennessee, United States. It is located in the upper Clearfork Valley in the Cumberland Mountains of northeastern Tennessee. It is the site of a post office, assigned ZIP code 37715. The population of the Zip Code Tabulation Area corresponding to Clairfield's ZIP code was 1,002 as of the 2000 Census.

== History ==
The Clearfork Valley remained sparsely populated throughout much of the 19th century, due mainly to limited bottomlands along the river for farming, poor soil, and the general isolation of the area. The few who settled in the valley mostly practiced subsistence farming. In the years after the Civil War, the farmers living in the valley began selling timber and mining rights to outside entrepreneurs.

During the 1880s, timber entrepreneur Alexander Arthur began buying up large amounts of land in the areas around Cumberland Gap, including much of the Clearfork Valley, with ambitious plans to establish a major industrial center. While Arthur's schemes failed, the completion of a railroad line connecting the Clearfork with Jellico and Middlesboro in 1905 opened the valley to major coal mining operations. A string of company towns, including Clairfield, sprang up throughout the valley during this period. By 1910, three companies— King Mountain Coal, New Jellico Coal, and Standard Coal and Coke— were operating drift mines at Clairfield that produced a total of 750 tons of coal per day. After World War II, increased mechanization and the advent of less-labor-intensive surface mining led to a decline throughout the Clearfork Valley.

== Geography ==
Clairfield is located in the Clearfork Valley, a very rugged and remote area of northeastern Tennessee. The community occupies a relatively broad hollow along the Clear Fork just east of the Claiborne-Campbell county line, and south of the Tennessee-Kentucky state line. Eagan lies further down the valley to the west, and Pruden lies at the state line to the northeast.

Tennessee State Route 90 is the only major highway in the area.

According to the United States Census Bureau, the Zip Code Tabulation Area that includes Clairfield has a total area of 79.3 square miles (205 km^{2}).

== Demographics ==
As of the census of 2000, there were 1,002 people in the Zip Code Tabulation Area corresponding to Clairfield's ZIP code, with a population density of 14 people per square mile. The racial makeup of the community was 98.8% white non-Hispanic. The median resident age was 35.1 years.

The average household size in 2000 was 2.6 people. The percentage of family households was 77.4%; 39.7% of residents reported 1999 income below the poverty line.

The estimated median household income in 1999 was $16,477 as compared to $38,874 with that of the state. The estimated median price of a house or condominium was $23,400.
