= Morley, Tennessee =

- Unincorporated community
- Location within Tennessee Location within the United States
- Coordinates: 36°33′4″N 84°2′54″W
- Country: United States
- State: Tennessee
- County: Campbell
- Elevation: 1,060 ft (320 m)
- Time zone: UTC-6 (Central (CST))
  - Summer (DST): UTC-5 (CDT)
- ZIP codes: 37812
- GNIS feature ID: 1294387

Morley is an unincorporated community and former coal town in Campbell County, Tennessee.
