= Clear Fork (Cumberland River tributary) =

River in Kentucky and Tennessee

Coordinates: 36.73508°N 84.14743°W

Location
- Country: US

Physical characteristics
- Source
  - location: Bell County, Kentucky
- Mouth
  - location: Cumberland River in Whitley County, Kentucky
- Discharge
  - location: Saxton City, KY
  - average: 567 cu/ft. per sec.

The Clear Fork is a 42.8-mile-long (68.9 km) tributary of the Cumberland River in Kentucky and Tennessee. By the Cumberland and Ohio rivers, it is part of the Mississippi River watershed.

The Clear Fork rises in Bell County, Kentucky, just north of the Tennessee state line. It flows west-southwest, crossing into Claiborne County, Tennessee, and passing the village of Clairfield. Turning more to the northwest, it crosses into Whitley County, Kentucky, and continues to the Cumberland River just east of Williamsburg.

The river is paralleled by Tennessee State Route 90 for much of its upper course, then by U.S. Route 25W and Tennessee State Route 9 to the Kentucky border. In Kentucky, the river valley is used by U.S. Route 25W and Interstate 75.

== See also ==
- List of rivers of Kentucky
- List of rivers of Tennessee
