= Beech Grove (disambiguation) =

Beech Grove is a city in Marion County, Indiana.

Beech Grove and Beechgrove may also refer to:

- Beech Grove, Arkansas, an unincorporated community
- Beech Grove, Morgan County, Indiana, an unincorporated community
- Beech Grove, Kentucky (disambiguation)
- Beech Grove, Tennessee (disambiguation)
- Beech Grove, Texas, an unincorporated community
- Beech Grove, Virginia, an unincorporated community
- Beech Grove, West Virginia, an unincorporated community
- Beechgrove, a cricket ground in Derry, Northern Ireland
- Beechgrove (TV series), a BBC Scotland gardening television series
