= 2024 Tennessee Republican presidential primary =

- March 5, 2024

58 Republican National Convention delegates

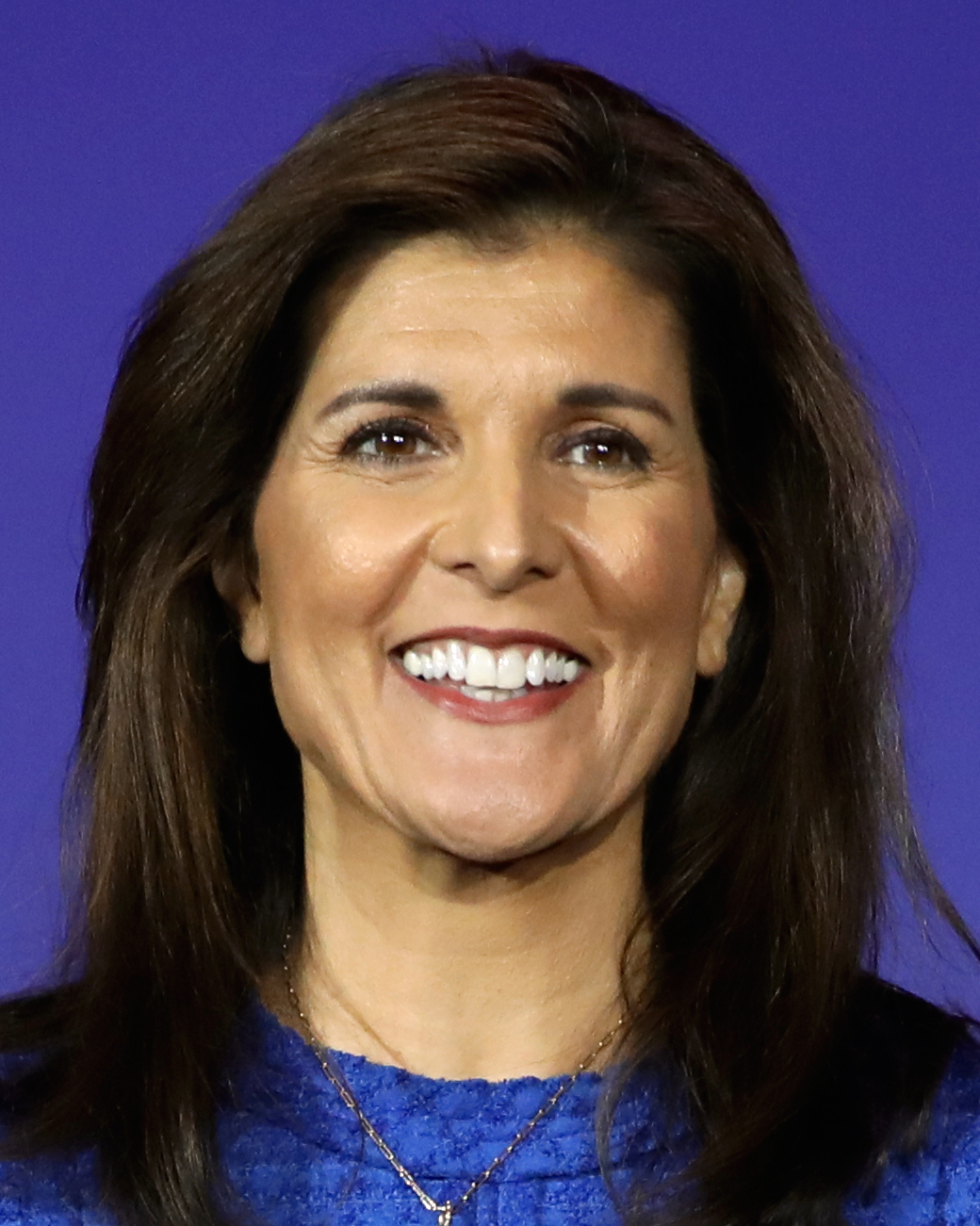
Candidate	Donald Trump	Nikki Haley
Home state	Florida	South Carolina
Delegate count	58	0
Popular vote	446,850	112,958
Percentage	77.33%	19.55%

Trump
40 – 50%
50 – 60%
60 – 70%
70 – 80%
80 – 90%
90 – 100%
Haley
40 – 50%
50 – 60%
60 – 70%
70 – 80%
80 – 90%
90 – 100%
Tie/No Data
40 – 50%
50%

The 2024 Tennessee Republican presidential primary was held on March 5, 2024, as part of the Republican Party primaries for the 2024 presidential election. 58 delegates to the 2024 Republican National Convention were allocated on a winner-take-most basis. The contest was held on Super Tuesday alongside primaries in 14 other states.

Donald Trump dominated across most of the state, with exceptions in certain traditionally Republican suburban areas where Nikki Haley performed well, including southern Davidson County, parts of Williamson County, and some predominantly white suburban and urban areas in Shelby, Knox, and Hamilton counties. Despite these pockets of support for Haley, Trump still carried every county by a comfortable margin.

== Candidates ==
The filing deadline for candidates was on December 5, 2023, at noon. Tennessee Secretary of State Tre Hargett certified nine candidates for the Republican ballot:

- Ryan Binkley (suspended campaign)
- Doug Burgum (suspended campaign)
- Chris Christie (suspended campaign)
- Ron DeSantis (suspended campaign)
- Nikki Haley
- Asa Hutchinson (suspended campaign)
- Vivek Ramaswamy (suspended campaign)
- David Stuckenberg
- Donald Trump
- Uncommitted

== Endorsements ==
Donald Trump

U.S. Senators

- Marsha Blackburn, (2019–present)
- Bill Hagerty, (2021–present)

U.S. Representatives

- Jimmy Duncan, TN-02 (1988–2019)
- Chuck Fleischmann, TN-03 (2011–present)
- Mark Green, TN-07 (2019–2025)
- Diana Harshbarger, TN-01 (2021–present)
- David Kustoff, TN-08 (2017–present)
- Andy Ogles, TN-05 (2023–present)
- John Rose, TN-06 (2019–present)

State representatives

- Michele Carringer, Member of the Tennessee House of Representatives from the 16th district (2021–present)
- Kelly Keisling, Member of the Tennessee House of Representatives from the 38th district (2011–present)
- Clay Doggett, Member of the Tennessee House of Representatives from the 70th district (2019–present)
- Kip Capley, Member of the Tennessee House of Representatives from the 71st district (2023–present)
- Mary Littleton, Member of the Tennessee House of Representatives from the 78th district (2013–present)
- Ron Gant, Member of the Tennessee House of Representatives from the 94th district (2017–present)

Local and county official

- Glenn Jacobs, Mayor of Knox County (2021–present)
Nikki Haley

State representative

- Sabi "Doc" Kumar, District 66 (2015–present)

=== Withdrawn candidates ===
Ron DeSantis (withdrawn)

State senator

- Richard Briggs, Tennessee State Senator from District 7 (2015–present)
- J. Adam Lowe, Tennessee State Senator from District 1 (2023–present)

State representatives

- Dale Carr, District 12 (2012–present)
- Jason Zachary, District 14 (2015–present)
- Ryan Williams, Tennessee State Representative from District 42 (2011–present); Majority Caucus Chairman of the Tennessee House of Representatives (2016–2019)
- Gino Bulso, District 61 (2023–present)
Tim Scott (withdrawn)

Former governor

- Bill Haslam, (2011–2019)

=== Declined ===
Declined to endorse

U.S. Representatives

- Tim Burchett, TN-02 (2019–present)
- Scott DesJarlais, TN-04 (2011–present)

== Maps ==
Endorsements by incumbent Republicans in the Tennessee House of Representatives. Endorsed Donald Trump (6) Endorsed Ron DeSantis (4) (withdrawn) Endorsed Nikki Haley (1) No endorsement (64) Non-Republicans (24)

Endorsements by incumbent Republicans in the Tennessee Senate. Endorsed Ron DeSantis (1) (withdrawn) No endorsement (26) Non-Republicans (6)

== Polling ==
Poll source	Date(s) administered	Sample size	Margin of error	Doug Burgum	Chris Christie	Ron DeSantis	Nikki Haley	Asa Hutchinson	Mike Pence	Vivek Ramaswamy	Tim Scott	Donald Trump	Other	Undecided
Targoz Market Research (Note: Poll sponsored by the Beacon Center of Tennessee)	Dec 14–28, 2023	522 (LV)	± 2.66%	–	1%	12%	7%	0%	–	2%	–	72%	1%	6%
Morning Consult	Nov 1–30, 2023	1,078 (LV)	–	0%	2%	17%	8%	1%	–	4%	1%	66%	–	1%
Morning Consult	Oct 1–31, 2023	1,061 (LV)	–	0%	1%	14%	6%	0%	6%	5%	2%	63%	–	3%
Morning Consult	Sep 1–30, 2023	1,032 (LV)	–	0%	2%	15%	5%	0%	5%	6%	2%	63%	0% (Note: Will Hurd with 0%)	2%
Morning Consult	Aug 1–31, 2023	1,109 (LV)	–	1%	2%	13%	2%	1%	8%	10%	3%	59%	0% (Note: Francis Suarez and Will Hurd with 0%)	1%
Morning Consult	July 1–31, 2023	1,079 (LV)	–	0%	2%	17%	2%	0%	10%	9%	2%	57%	0%	1%
Morning Consult	June 1–30, 2023	1,072 (LV)	–	0%	1%	21%	3%	0%	9%	3%	3%	59%	1% (Note: Liz Cheney with 1%; Greg Abbott, Will Hurd, and Kristi Noem with 0%)	–
The Beacon Center	Jun 14–22, 2023	502 (LV)	–	–	–	12%	–	–	8%	1%	1%	61%	–	9%
Morning Consult	May 1–31, 2023	1,147 (LV)	–	–	–	18%	3%	0%	7%	2%	1%	64%	3% (Note: Liz Cheney with 2%; Greg Abbott with 1%; Kristi Noem and Glenn Youngkin with 0%)	2%
Morning Consult	Apr 1–30, 2023	986 (LV)	–	–	–	22%	3%	0%	8%	1%	1%	61%	5% (Note: Liz Cheney with 2%; Greg Abbott, Mike Pompeo, and Glenn Youngkin with 1%; Kristi Noem with 0%)	–
Vanderbilt University	Apr 19–23, 2023	1,003 (RV)	± 3.6%	–	–	25%	4%	2%	5%	–	3%	59%	–	–
Vanderbilt University	Apr 19–23, 2023	1,003 (RV)	± 3.6%	–	–	38%	–	–	–	–	–	57%	–	–
Morning Consult	Mar 1–31, 2023	1,027 (LV)	–	–	–	25%	3%	–	8%	–	1%	59%	5% (Note: Liz Cheney with 3%; Kristi Noem and Mike Pompeo with 1%; Greg Abbott and Glenn Youngkin with 0%)	–
Morning Consult	Feb 1–28, 2023	980 (LV)	–	–	–	29%	3%	–	8%	–	0%	55%	5% (Note: Liz Cheney and Ted Cruz with 2%; Mike Pompeo with 1%; Greg Abbott, Kristi Noem, and Glenn Youngkin with 0%)	–
Morning Consult	Jan 1–31, 2023	1,265 (LV)	–	–	–	35%	1%	–	10%	–	1%	47%	6% (Note: Ted Cruz with 2%; Greg Abbott, Mike Pompeo, Liz Cheney, and Glenn Youngkin with 1%; Kristi Noem with 0%)	1%
Morning Consult	Dec 1–31, 2022	698 (LV)	–	–	–	34%	0%	–	10%	–	1%	51%	3% (Note: Ted Cruz with 2%; Liz Cheney with 1%; Greg Abbott, Mike Pompeo, and Kristi Noem with 0%)	1%
Vanderbilt University	Nov 8–28, 2022	474 (RV)	± 3.4%	–	–	54%	–	–	–	–	–	41%	–	5%

== Results ==
Tennessee Republican primary, March 5, 2024
Candidate	Votes	Percentage	Actual delegate count		
Candidate	Votes	Percentage	Bound	Unbound	Total
Donald Trump	446,850	77.33%	58	0	58
Nikki Haley	112,958	19.55%	0	0	0
Ron DeSantis (withdrawn)	7,947	1.38%	0	0	0
Uncommitted	4,884	0.85%	0	0	0
Chris Christie (withdrawn)	1,874	0.32%	0	0	0
Vivek Ramaswamy (withdrawn)	1,714	0.30%	0	0	0
Ryan Binkley (withdrawn)	722	0.13%	0	0	0
Asa Hutchinson (withdrawn)	533	0.09%	0	0	0
David Stuckenberg	352	0.06%	0	0	0
Total:	577,834	100.00%	58	0	58

=== By county ===
By county

County	Donald Trump		Nikki Haley		Others		Total votes
County	%	#	%	#	%	#	Total votes
Anderson	75.66%	6,372	21.18%	1,784	3.16%	266	8,422
Bedford	86.99%	3,250	10.81%	404	2.20%	82	3,736
Benton	90.17%	1,560	8.73%	151	1.10%	19	1,730
Bledsoe	90.28%	1,597	8.25%	146	1.47%	26	1,769
Blount	76.33%	12,239	20.54%	3,294	3.13%	501	16,034
Bradley	80.26%	10,068	16.34%	2,050	3.40%	426	12,544
Campbell	90.29%	2,668	8.56%	253	1.15%	34	2,955
Cannon	89.58%	1,462	8.58%	140	1.84%	30	1,632
Carroll	88.75%	2,004	9.96%	225	1.28%	29	2,258
Carter	82.81%	5,985	14.38%	1,039	2.81%	203	7,227
Cheatham	81.97%	3,132	15.76%	602	2.28%	87	3,821
Chester	85.56%	1,463	11.52%	197	2.92%	50	1,710
Claiborne	88.86%	3,907	9.30%	409	1.84%	81	4,397
Clay	88.53%	579	9.94%	65	1.53%	10	654
Cocke	86.74%	4,540	10.83%	567	2.43%	127	5,234
Coffee	77.38%	4,820	18.04%	1,124	4.58%	285	6,229
Crockett	88.24%	1,050	9.83%	117	1.93%	23	1,190
Cumberland	83.05%	8,910	14.18%	1,521	2.77%	297	10,728
Davidson	60.96%	17,243	36.14%	10,221	2.90%	821	28,285
Decatur	87.41%	1,639	10.29%	193	2.30%	43	1,875
DeKalb	85.64%	2,242	11.92%	312	2.44%	64	2,618
Dickson	83.20%	3,546	14.41%	614	2.39%	102	4,262
Dyer	87.45%	2,223	10.46%	266	2.09%	53	2,542
Fayette	86.23%	3,925	11.88%	541	1.89%	86	4,552
Fentress	91.47%	2,090	7.05%	161	1.49%	34	2,285
Franklin	82.70%	3,720	14.32%	644	2.98%	134	4,498
Gibson	87.23%	3,251	11.08%	413	1.69%	63	3,727
Giles	89.17%	2,166	9.22%	224	1.61%	39	2,429
Grainger	88.64%	2,528	8.94%	255	2.42%	69	2,852
Greene	83.27%	6,313	14.76%	1,119	1.97%	149	7,581
Grundy	92.11%	1,179	6.88%	88	1.01%	13	1,280
Hamblen	84.60%	4,746	13.01%	730	2.39%	134	5,610
Hamilton	66.79%	21,654	29.10%	9,433	4.11%	1,332	32,419
Hancock	90.82%	623	7.43%	51	1.75%	12	686
Hardeman	91.49%	1,386	7.26%	110	1.25%	19	1,515
Hardin	87.66%	1,939	10.53%	233	1.81%	40	2,212
Hawkins	85.40%	5,374	12.11%	762	2.49%	157	6,293
Haywood	89.43%	626	9.29%	65	1.29%	9	700
Henderson	86.14%	2,889	10.70%	359	3.16%	106	3,354
Henry	85.49%	2,704	13.25%	419	1.26%	40	3,163
Hickman	88.93%	1,791	9.38%	189	1.69%	34	2,014
Houston	89.65%	658	8.99%	66	1.36%	10	734
Humphreys	86.31%	1,141	12.10%	160	1.59%	21	1,322
Jackson	89.56%	1,107	8.50%	105	1.94%	24	1,236
Jefferson	82.42%	5,698	14.73%	1,018	2.85%	197	6,913
Johnson	87.47%	1,912	10.89%	238	1.64%	36	2,186
Knox	67.81%	31,897	27.42%	12,900	4.77%	2,243	47,040
Lake	91.72%	288	6.69%	21	1.59%	5	314
Lauderdale	90.72%	1,271	7.92%	111	1.36%	19	1,401
Lawrence	88.04%	3,548	10.10%	407	1.86%	75	4,030
Lewis	92.99%	1,035	6.20%	69	0.81%	9	1,113
Lincoln	87.57%	2,882	10.51%	346	1.92%	63	3,291
Loudon	74.30%	6,915	22.65%	2,108	3.05%	284	9,307
Macon	91.90%	2,098	6.44%	147	1.66%	38	2,283
Madison	76.80%	5,466	20.01%	1,424	3.19%	227	7,117
Marion	86.17%	2,836	11.76%	387	2.07%	68	3,291
Marshall	85.86%	2,399	11.56%	323	2.58%	72	2,794
Maury	80.71%	6,588	17.02%	1,389	2.27%	186	8,163
McMinn	85.13%	5,501	12.52%	809	2.35%	152	6,462
McNairy	89.71%	2,363	8.47%	223	1.82%	48	2,634
Meigs	84.84%	1,707	12.13%	244	3.03%	61	2,012
Monroe	84.96%	5,670	12.41%	828	2.63%	176	6,674
Montgomery	75.90%	7,679	20.43%	2,067	3.67%	371	10,117
Moore	83.67%	748	13.31%	119	3.02%	27	894
Morgan	89.78%	1,678	8.19%	153	2.03%	38	1,869
Obion	89.82%	2,135	8.46%	201	1.72%	41	2,377
Overton	90.99%	2,251	7.36%	182	1.65%	41	2,474
Perry	90.76%	629	8.08%	56	1.16%	8	693
Pickett	88.41%	763	10.43%	90	1.16%	10	863
Polk	90.26%	2,158	8.16%	195	1.59%	38	2,391
Putnam	81.44%	5,677	16.17%	1,127	2.39%	167	6,971
Rhea	82.69%	4,338	14.22%	746	3.09%	162	5,246
Roane	81.51%	4,888	16.17%	970	2.32%	139	5,997
Robertson	80.77%	5,567	16.18%	1,115	3.05%	210	6,892
Rutherford	76.22%	18,253	20.11%	4,815	3.67%	879	23,947
Scott	91.30%	1,353	7.56%	112	1.15%	17	1,482
Sequatchie	86.66%	1,552	11.61%	208	1.73%	31	1,791
Sevier	83.12%	8,022	14.16%	1,367	2.72%	262	9,651
Shelby	70.54%	21,224	26.78%	8,057	2.68%	806	30,087
Smith	87.82%	2,178	9.60%	238	2.58%	64	2,480
Stewart	86.20%	1,174	12.56%	171	1.25%	17	1,362
Sullivan	77.50%	10,933	19.80%	2,794	2.70%	381	14,108
Sumner	72.88%	17,604	22.06%	5,328	5.06%	1,222	24,154
Tipton	84.55%	4,672	12.45%	688	2.99%	165	5,526
Trousdale	88.50%	639	9.83%	71	1.66%	12	722
Unicoi	86.29%	2,152	10.99%	274	2.73%	68	2,494
Union	89.69%	1,574	8.89%	156	1.42%	25	1,755
Van Buren	88.68%	619	9.03%	63	2.29%	16	698
Warren	86.90%	2,673	11.93%	367	1.17%	36	3,076
Washington	74.78%	9,080	22.42%	2,723	2.80%	340	12,143
Wayne	91.46%	1,199	6.71%	88	1.83%	24	1,311
Weakley	87.06%	2,450	10.48%	295	2.45%	69	2,814
White	89.47%	2,855	9.15%	292	1.38%	44	3,191
Williamson	65.52%	21,296	29.77%	9,676	4.71%	1,530	32,502
Wilson	75.86%	12,454	20.35%	3,341	3.79%	622	16,417

=== Results by congressional district ===
Trump won all 9 of Tennessee's congressional districts and received all 3 delegates per district for a total of 27.

District	Trump	Haley	Delegates
1st	81.6%	15.8%	3
2nd	72.9%	23.2%	3
3rd	75.9%	20.8%	3
4th	82.1%	15.1%	3
5th	70.2%	26.2%	3
6th	79.0%	17.8%	3
7th	75.8%	21.0%	3
8th	84.1%	13.7%	3
9th	72.0%	25.3%	3
Total	9/9	0/9	27
Source: "Tennessee Republican Presidential Nominating Process". thegreenpapers.com. March 5, 2024.

== See also ==
- 2024 Tennessee Democratic presidential primary
- 2024 Republican Party presidential primaries
- 2024 United States presidential election
- 2024 United States presidential election in Tennessee
- 2024 Tennessee elections
- 2024 United States elections

== Notes ==
Partisan clients
