= Tennessee House of Representatives 12th district =

State legislative district in Tennessee

Tennessee's 12th State House of Representatives district
- Map of Tennessee House districts with the 12th District shaded in red
Representative
Fred Atchley; R–Sevierville
since 2025
- Demographics: 83.4% White; 1.4% Black; 11.2% Hispanic; 1.1% Asian; 2.2% Multiracial
- Population (2024): 68,280

The Tennessee House of Representatives 12th district is one of the 99 legislative districts in the lower house of the Tennessee General Assembly. The district is located in East Tennessee and covers most of Sevier County. The district includes Gatlinburg, Pigeon Forge, Pittman Center, and much of Sevierville. It also includes Seymour, Boyds Creek, and Wears Valley. Much of rest of the district is unincorporated and mostly rural. There are no settlements in the south, it being taken up by Great Smoky Mountains National Park. Fred Atchley has represented the district since 2025.

== Demographics ==
The Tennessee Comptroller estimates the population as of 2024 at 68,280.

- 83.4% of the district is White
- 11.2% of the district is Hispanic
- 1.2% of the district is Black
- 1.1% of the district is Asian
- 2.2% of the district is Two or more races

Detailed demographic information is also available through Census Reporter.

== History ==
Before the 84th General Assembly, there was a district for Sevier County. From the 84th to 87th GAs, there was a Floterial District made up of Cocke, Jefferson and Sevier counties. The 88th Tennessee General Assembly was the first in which all districts were numbered. At this time, the 12th district was in Blount, Jefferson and Sevier counties. From the 89th-90th GAs, it was in Blount, Cocke, Jefferson and Sevier counties. From the 91st-92nd, it was in Blount, Jefferson and Sevier counties. From the 93rd-97th GAs, it was part of Blount and Sevier counties. During the 98th GA, it was composed of Grainger, Jefferson and Sevier counties. Since the 99th General Assembly, it has been composed of all or part of Sevier County.

== List of Representatives ==
Representative	Party	Years of Service	General Assembly	Hometown
Fred Atchley	Republican	2025-present	114th	Sevierville
Dale Carr	Republican	2013-2024	108th-113th	Sevierville
Richard Montgomery	Republican	1999-2012	101st-107th	Sevierville
Larry Huskey	Republican	1981-1998	92nd-100th	Sevierville
Bill Atchley	Republican	1979-1980	91st	Sevierville
Fred C. Atchley	Republican	1973-1978	88th-90th	Sevierville
Glenn Quarles	Republican	1969-1972	86th-87th	Jefferson City
Fred C. Atchley	Republican	1961-1968	82nd-85th	Sevierville
E.D. Robertson	Republican	1959-1960	81st	Sevierville
Fred C. Atchley	Republican	1951-1958	76th-80th	Sevierville
