= Beech Grove, Tennessee =

Beech Grove or Beechgrove, Tennessee may refer to:

- Beech Grove, Anderson County, Tennessee
- Beechgrove, Coffee County, Tennessee
- Beech Grove, Dyer County, Tennessee
- Beech Grove, Grainger County, Tennessee
- Beech Grove, Knox County, Tennessee
- Beech Grove, Trousdale County, Tennessee
- Beech Grove (Nashville, Tennessee), a mansion listed on the National Register of Historic Places
