= 2024 Tennessee Democratic presidential primary =

- March 5, 2024

72 delegates (63 pledged, 9 unpledged) to the Democratic National Convention

| Candidate | Joe Biden | Uncommitted |
| Home state | Delaware | – |
| Delegate count | 63 | 0 |
| Popular vote | 122,803 | 10,475 |
| Percentage | 92.1% | 7.9% |

Biden
80 – 90%
>90%

The 2024 Tennessee Democratic presidential primary took place on March 5, 2024, as part of the Democratic Party primaries for the 2024 presidential election. 63 delegates to the Democratic National Convention were allocated, with 9 additional unpledged delegates. The open primary was held on Super Tuesday alongside primaries in 14 other states and territories.

As the incumbent, Joe Biden was the only individual on the primary ballot receiving all 63 delegates. An option for uncommitted delegates drew fewer than 8% of votes, far from attaining a delegate.

== Candidates ==
The filing deadline was December 5, 2023, at noon. President Joe Biden was the only candidate who met the certification requirements to appear on the ballot.

US Representative Dean Phillips filed to run, but did not get enough signatures to make the ballot.

Write-in candidates were permitted, and "uncommitted" was an option on the ballot.

== Endorsements ==
Joe Biden

U.S. Representatives

- Steve Cohen, U.S. Representative from TN-09 (2007–present)
- Jim Cooper, U.S. Representative from TN-05 (2003–2023) and TN-04 (1983–1995)

Statewide officials

- Phil Bredesen, 48th Governor of Tennessee (2003–2011), 4th Mayor of Nashville (1991–1999)

Notable individuals

- Andrea Conte, First Lady of Tennessee (2003–2011), First Lady of Nashville (1991–1999)

Organizations

- Tennessee Democratic Party

== Polling ==
| Poll source | Date(s) administered | Sample size (Note: Key: A – all adults RV – registered voters LV – likely voters V – unclear) | Margin of error | Joe Biden | Robert F. Kennedy Jr. | Marianne Williamson | Other / Undecided |
|---|---|---|---|---|---|---|---|
| | February 28, 2024 | Williamson un-suspends her candidacy | | | | | |
| | February 7, 2024 | Williamson suspends her candidacy | | | | | |
| | October 27, 2023 | Phillips declares his candidacy | | | | | |
| | October 9, 2023 | Kennedy withdraws from the primaries | | | | | |
| Targoz Market Research (Note: Poll sponsored by the Beacon Center of Tennessee) | Oct 5–16, 2023 | 270 (RV) | – | 75% | 9% | 3% | 12% |
| Targoz Market Research | Oct 5–16, 2023 | 224 (LV) | – | 74% | 10% | 2% | 14% |
| Targoz Market Research | Jun 14–22, 2023 | 356 (LV) | – | 63% | 7% | 2% | 28% |

== Results ==
2024 Tennessee Democratic pres. primary
| Candidate | Votes | % | Delegates |
|---|---|---|---|
| Joe Biden (incumbent) | 122,803 | 92.14 | 63 |
| Uncommitted | 10,475 | 7.86 | 0 |
| Total | 133,278 | 100% | 63 |

=== By county ===
By county

| County | Joe Biden | | Uncommitted | | Total votes |
| County | % | # | % | # | Total votes |
|---|---|---|---|---|---|
| Anderson | 93.14% | 1,249 | 6.86% | 92 | 1,341 |
| Bedford | 92.84% | 337 | 7.16% | 26 | 363 |
| Benton | 93.29% | 139 | 6.71% | 10 | 149 |
| Bledsoe | 90.38% | 141 | 9.62% | 15 | 156 |
| Blount | 93.16% | 1,620 | 6.84% | 119 | 1,739 |
| Bradley | 90.79% | 670 | 9.21% | 68 | 738 |
| Campbell | 89.36% | 168 | 10.64% | 20 | 188 |
| Cannon | 82.71% | 110 | 17.29% | 23 | 133 |
| Carroll | 94.30% | 248 | 5.70% | 15 | 263 |
| Carter | 82.79% | 279 | 17.21% | 58 | 337 |
| Cheatham | 91.17% | 547 | 8.83% | 53 | 600 |
| Chester | 93.18% | 123 | 6.82% | 9 | 132 |
| Claiborne | 85.56% | 314 | 14.44% | 53 | 367 |
| Clay | 94.34% | 50 | 5.66% | 3 | 53 |
| Cocke | 91.84% | 180 | 8.16% | 16 | 196 |
| Coffee | 93.28% | 444 | 6.72% | 32 | 476 |
| Crockett | 92.16% | 94 | 7.84% | 8 | 102 |
| Cumberland | 94.87% | 666 | 5.13% | 36 | 702 |
| Davidson | 90.56% | 33,313 | 9.44% | 3,471 | 36,784 |
| Decatur | 94.35% | 117 | 5.65% | 7 | 124 |
| DeKalb | 88.94% | 185 | 11.06% | 23 | 208 |
| Dickson | 93.41% | 482 | 6.59% | 34 | 516 |
| Dyer | 96.27% | 232 | 3.73% | 9 | 241 |
| Fayette | 97.63% | 740 | 2.37% | 18 | 758 |
| Fentress | 87.60% | 113 | 12.40% | 16 | 129 |
| Franklin | 90.61% | 473 | 9.39% | 49 | 522 |
| Gibson | 96.33% | 472 | 3.67% | 18 | 490 |
| Giles | 93.79% | 302 | 6.21% | 20 | 322 |
| Grainger | 89.31% | 117 | 10.69% | 14 | 131 |
| Greene | 91.00% | 374 | 9.00% | 37 | 411 |
| Grundy | 85.92% | 122 | 14.08% | 20 | 142 |
| Hamblen | 92.31% | 456 | 7.69% | 38 | 494 |
| Hamilton | 91.84% | 7,787 | 8.16% | 692 | 8,479 |
| Hancock | 81.25% | 26 | 18.75% | 6 | 32 |
| Hardeman | 97.12% | 574 | 2.88% | 17 | 591 |
| Hardin | 90.62% | 87 | 9.38% | 9 | 96 |
| Hawkins | 92.48% | 283 | 7.52% | 23 | 306 |
| Haywood | 97.48% | 465 | 2.52% | 12 | 477 |
| Henderson | 92.13% | 82 | 7.87% | 7 | 89 |
| Henry | 95.88% | 396 | 4.12% | 17 | 413 |
| Hickman | 94.17% | 194 | 5.83% | 12 | 206 |
| Houston | 90.27% | 102 | 9.73% | 11 | 113 |
| Humphreys | 93.09% | 202 | 6.91% | 15 | 217 |
| Jackson | 89.66% | 156 | 10.34% | 18 | 174 |
| Jefferson | 92.22% | 332 | 7.78% | 28 | 360 |
| Johnson | 92.37% | 121 | 7.63% | 10 | 131 |
| Knox | 88.54% | 10,727 | 11.46% | 1,389 | 12,116 |
| Lake | 95.18% | 79 | 4.82% | 4 | 83 |
| Lauderdale | 96.62% | 343 | 3.38% | 12 | 355 |
| Lawrence | 88.48% | 215 | 11.52% | 28 | 243 |
| Lewis | 92.13% | 117 | 7.87% | 10 | 127 |
| Lincoln | 94.28% | 280 | 5.72% | 17 | 297 |
| Loudon | 94.47% | 666 | 5.53% | 39 | 705 |
| Macon | 92.45% | 98 | 7.55% | 8 | 106 |
| Madison | 97.11% | 1,882 | 2.89% | 56 | 1,938 |
| Marion | 84.72% | 438 | 15.28% | 79 | 517 |
| Marshall | 97.30% | 324 | 2.70% | 9 | 333 |
| Maury | 94.08% | 985 | 5.92% | 62 | 1,047 |
| McMinn | 91.48% | 365 | 8.52% | 34 | 399 |
| McNairy | 93.98% | 156 | 6.02% | 10 | 166 |
| Meigs | 90.60% | 135 | 9.40% | 14 | 149 |
| Monroe | 91.51% | 291 | 8.49% | 27 | 318 |
| Montgomery | 93.40% | 2,192 | 6.60% | 155 | 2,347 |
| Moore | 95.40% | 83 | 4.60% | 4 | 87 |
| Morgan | 91.72% | 133 | 8.28% | 12 | 145 |
| Obion | 94.34% | 200 | 5.66% | 12 | 212 |
| Overton | 86.75% | 262 | 13.25% | 40 | 302 |
| Perry | 95.08% | 58 | 4.92% | 3 | 61 |
| Pickett | 100.00% | 58 | 0.00% | 0 | 58 |
| Polk | 88.56% | 209 | 11.44% | 27 | 236 |
| Putnam | 93.38% | 987 | 6.62% | 70 | 1,057 |
| Rhea | 89.82% | 203 | 10.18% | 23 | 226 |
| Roane | 93.19% | 657 | 6.81% | 48 | 705 |
| Robertson | 91.87% | 689 | 8.13% | 61 | 750 |
| Rutherford | 92.18% | 4,409 | 7.82% | 374 | 4,783 |
| Scott | 93.15% | 68 | 6.85% | 5 | 73 |
| Sequatchie | 92.08% | 93 | 7.92% | 8 | 101 |
| Sevier | 92.11% | 525 | 7.89% | 45 | 570 |
| Shelby | 94.82% | 27,289 | 5.18% | 1,491 | 28,780 |
| Smith | 90.24% | 148 | 9.76% | 16 | 164 |
| Stewart | 92.25% | 131 | 7.75% | 11 | 142 |
| Sullivan | 92.01% | 921 | 7.99% | 80 | 1,001 |
| Sumner | 91.31% | 2,313 | 8.69% | 220 | 2,533 |
| Tipton | 95.46% | 442 | 4.54% | 21 | 463 |
| Trousdale | 94.44% | 85 | 5.56% | 5 | 90 |
| Unicoi | 90.71% | 127 | 9.29% | 13 | 140 |
| Union | 86.89% | 106 | 13.11% | 16 | 122 |
| Van Buren | 82.35% | 42 | 17.65% | 9 | 51 |
| Warren | 93.02% | 373 | 6.98% | 28 | 401 |
| Washington | 90.31% | 1,202 | 9.69% | 129 | 1,331 |
| Wayne | 91.67% | 66 | 8.33% | 6 | 72 |
| Weakley | 90.55% | 230 | 9.45% | 24 | 254 |
| White | 94.71% | 197 | 5.29% | 11 | 208 |
| Williamson | 93.27% | 3,532 | 6.73% | 255 | 3,787 |
| Wilson | 93.07% | 1,988 | 6.93% | 148 | 2,136 |

=== Results by congressional district ===
Biden won all 9 of Tennessee's congressional districts.

| District | Biden | Uncommitted |
|---|---|---|
| 1st | 90.9% | 9.1% |
| 2nd | 89.3% | 10.7% |
| 3rd | 91.9% | 8.1% |
| 4th | 91.7% | 8.3% |
| 5th | 91.3% | 8.7% |
| 6th | 91.1% | 8.9% |
| 7th | 91.5% | 8.5% |
| 8th | 95.5% | 4.5% |
| 9th | 94.8% | 5.2% |
Source: "Tennessee Democratic Delegation 2024". www.thegreenpapers.com.

== See also ==
- 2024 Tennessee Republican presidential primary
- 2024 Democratic Party presidential primaries
- 2024 United States presidential election
- 2024 United States presidential election in Tennessee
- 2024 Tennessee elections
- 2024 United States elections
