= 2024 Tennessee elections =

- November 5, 2024 (general); August 1, 2024 (state primary); March 5, 2024 (presidential primary)
- Registered: 4,825,601 (Note: November 5th)
- Turnout: 64.04% ▼ (Note: November 5th) 5.26 pp
- 50–60% 60–70% 70–80% 0–10% 10–20% 20–30% 30–40% 0–10% 10–20% 20–30%

Tennessee state elections in 2024 were held on Tuesday, November 5, 2024. Primary elections for the United States Senate, United States House of Representatives, Tennessee Senate, and Tennessee House of Representatives, as well as various judicial retention elections, including the election of a Tennessee Supreme Court justice, were held on August 1, 2024.

== Election schedule ==
- Tuesday, March 5 (Super Tuesday) – Democratic and Republican presidential preference primaries and certain local government primary elections
- Thursday, August 1 – partisan primary elections for all state and federal legislative offices except for odd-numbered state senate districts and class 2 U.S. senator, general elections for certain state judicial and local government offices
- Tuesday, November 5 – general election for all state and federal legislative offices except for odd-numbered state senate districts and class 2 U.S. senator, and electors for U.S. president

== Presidential election ==
=== President of the United States ===
Results by county: Trump: 50–60%; 60–70%; 70–80%; 80–90%; Harris: 40–50%; 60–70%

Tennessee is a stronghold for the Republican Party, and is considered a reliable "red state." Tennessee has 11 electoral votes in the Electoral college.

The presidential primaries were held on March 5, 2024. Donald Trump won the Republican primary in a landslide victory over former South Carolina Governor Nikki Haley. President Joe Biden won the Democratic primary in a landslide as well. Although Biden initially ran for re-election and became the party's presumptive nominee. He withdrew from the race on July 21 and endorsed Vice President Kamala Harris, who launched her presidential campaign the same day.

In the general election, Donald Trump won Tennessee with 64.19% of the vote.

=== Results ===
2024 United States presidential election in Tennessee
Party	Candidate	Votes	%	±%
Republican	Donald Trump; JD Vance	1,966,865	64.19%	+3.53%
Democratic	Kamala Harris; Tim Walz	1,056,265	34.47%	−2.98%
Independent	Robert F. Kennedy Jr. (withdrawn); Nicole Shanahan (withdrawn)	21,535	0.70%	N/A
Green	Jill Stein (Note: Listed on the ballot without party affiliation.); Samson Kpadenou (Note: Replacement for Butch Ware, Stein's vice presidential nominee.)	8,967	0.29%	+0.14%
Independent	Jay Bowman; De Bowman	5,865	0.19%	N/A
Socialism and Liberation	Claudia de la Cruz; Karina Garcia	3,457	0.11%	+0.03%
Socialist Workers	Rachele Fruit; Dennis Richter	988	0.03%	−0.05%
Total votes		3,063,942	100.00%	
Republican hold				

March 5, 2024 primary results

Results by county: Biden: 80–90% >90%

2024 Tennessee Democratic pres. primary
Candidate	Votes	%	Delegates
Joe Biden (incumbent)	122,803	92.14	63
Uncommitted	10,475	7.86	0
Total	133,278	100%	63

Results by county: Trump: 60–70% 70–80% 80–90% >90%

Tennessee Republican primary, March 5, 2024
Candidate	Votes	Percentage	Actual delegate count		
Candidate	Votes	Percentage	Bound	Unbound	Total
Donald Trump	446,850	77.33%	58	0	58
Nikki Haley	112,958	19.55%	0	0	0
Ron DeSantis (withdrawn)	7,947	1.38%	0	0	0
Uncommitted	4,884	0.85%	0	0	0
Chris Christie (withdrawn)	1,874	0.32%	0	0	0
Vivek Ramaswamy (withdrawn)	1,714	0.30%	0	0	0
Ryan Binkley (withdrawn)	722	0.13%	0	0	0
Asa Hutchinson (withdrawn)	533	0.09%	0	0	0
David Stuckenberg	352	0.06%	0	0	0
Total:	577,834	100.00%	58	0	58

== United States Congress ==
=== Senate ===
Results by county: Blackburn: 80–90%; 70–80%; 60–70%; 50–60%; Johnson: 60–70%; 50–60%

Incumbent one-term Republican Senator Marsha Blackburn won re-election to a second term with 63.80% of the vote.

=== Results ===
2024 United States Senate election in Tennessee
Party	Candidate	Votes	%	±%
Republican	Marsha Blackburn (incumbent)	1,918,743	63.80%	+9.09%
Democratic	Gloria Johnson	1,027,461	34.16%	−9.76%
Independent	Tharon Chandler	28,444	0.95%	N/A
Independent	Pamela Moses	24,682	0.82%	N/A
Independent	Hastina Robinson	8,278	0.28%	N/A
Total votes		3,007,608	100.00%	

August 1, 2024 primary results

Results by county: Blackburn: 80–90%; >90%

Republican primary results
Party	Candidate	Votes	%
Republican	Marsha Blackburn (incumbent)	367,799	89.48%
Republican	Tres Wittum	43,244	10.52%
Write-in		2	<0.01%
Total votes		411,045	100.00%

Results by county: Johnson: 40–50%; 50–60%; 60–70%; 70–80%; 80–90%; >90%; Miller-Watkins: 40–50%

Democratic primary results
Party	Candidate	Votes	%
Democratic	Gloria Johnson	143,962	70.20%
Democratic	Marquita Bradshaw	44,657	21.78%
Democratic	Lola Brown	10,027	4.89%
Democratic	Civil Miller-Watkins	6,420	3.13%
Total votes		205,066	100.00%

=== House of Representatives ===
District results: Republican: 50–60%; 60–70%; 70–80%; Democratic: 70–80%

Tennessee elected nine US representatives, each representing one of Tennessee's nine congressional districts. No seats changed hands, leaving the Tennessee delegation at a 8-1 Republican majority.

=== Results ===
District	Republican		Democratic		Others		Total		Result
District	Votes	%	Votes	%	Votes	%	Votes	%	Result
District 1	257,825	78.08%	64,021	19.39%	8,353	2.53%	330,199	100.00%	Republican hold
District 2	250,782	69.26%	111,316	30.74%	0	0.00%	362,098	100.00%	Republican hold
District 3	362,098	67.51%	102,841	29.36%	10,968	3.13%	350,328	100.00%	Republican hold
District 4	219,133	69.95%	83,832	26.76%	10,290	3.29%	313,255	100.00%	Republican hold
District 5	205,075	56.85%	142,387	39.47%	13,252	3.68%	360,714	100.00%	Republican hold
District 6	225,543	68.00%	106,144	32.00%	0	0.00%	331,687	100.00%	Republican hold
District 7	191,992	59.50%	122,764	38.05%	7,900	2.45%	322,656	100.00%	Republican hold
District 8	240,411	72.34%	85,043	25.59%	6,861	2.06%	332,315	100.00%	Republican hold
District 9	57,411	25.66%	159,522	71.31%	6,770	3.03%	223,703	100.00%	Democratic hold
Total	1,884,691	64.39%	977,870	33.41%	64,394	2.20%	2,926,955	100.00%	

Popular vote
Republican	64.39%
Democratic	33.41%
Other	2.20%

House seats
Republican	88.89%
Democratic	11.11%

== State legislature ==
=== State Senate ===

Results by senate district

Winners:

Republican hold
Democratic hold
No election

Elections for 16 of the 33 seats in Tennessee's State Senate were held on November 5, 2024.

Following the 2024 elections, no seats flipped.

=== State House of Representatives ===

Results by state house district

Winners:

Republican hold
Democratic hold

The elections of all 99 seats in the Tennessee House of Representatives were held on November 5, 2024.

Following the 2024 elections, no seats flipped.

== Judicial ==
=== Supreme Court ===
==== Retention elections (August 1, 2024) ====
Incumbent Tennessee Supreme Court Justice Dwight E. Tarwater was nominated by Governor Bill Lee to fill the vacancy left by the retirement of Justice Sharon G. Lee. On March 9, 2023, his nomination was confirmed by the Tennessee General Assembly. His term began on September 1, 2023.

He won the retention election on August 1, 2024.

Results by county: Retain: 60–70% 70–80% 80–90%

Tennessee Supreme Court Associate Justice, Dwight E. Tarwater retention election
Choice	Votes	%
For	390,549	72.86
Against	145,508	27.14
Total	536,057	100.00

=== Court of Criminal Appeals - Western Division ===
Incumbent Tennessee Court of Criminal Appeals Justice Matthew J. Wilson was nominated by Governor Bill Lee to fill the vacancy left after the death of Justice John Everett Williams.

Results by county: Retain: 60–70% 70–80% 80–90%

Tennessee Court of Criminal Appeals Justice, Matthew J. Wilson retention election
Choice	Votes	%
For	393,797	74.05
Against	137,970	25.95
Total	531,767	100.00

== Local elections ==
=== Shelby County ===
Shelby County turnout was low in August, which could have been the reason that Democrats did relatively poor.

==== General Sessions Court Clerk ====
Democrat Tami Sawyer won with 53.9% of the vote, defeating Republican nominee Lisa Arnold.

August 1, 2024 general election results
Party	Candidate	Votes	%
Democratic	Tami Sawyer	40,393	53.88%
Republican	Lisa Arnold	34,571	46.12%
Total votes		74,964	100.00%

=== Knox County ===
Knox County turnout was low in August, which could have been the reason that Republicans did relatively poor.

==== Assessor of Property ====
Republican Incumbent David Phil Ballard won with 54.5% of the vote, defeating Democratic nominee Drew Harper.

August 1, 2024 general election results
Party	Candidate	Votes	%
Republican	Phil Ballard (incumbent)	30,264	54.45%
Democratic	Drew A. Harper	25,315	45.55%
Total votes		55,579	100.00%

==== County Law Director ====
Republican Incumbent David Buuck won with 55.3% of the vote, defeating Democratic nominee Jackson Fenner.

August 1, 2024 general election results
Party	Candidate	Votes	%
Republican	David L. Buuck (incumbent)	30,671	55.25%
Democratic	Jackson Fenner	24,838	44.75%
Total votes		55,509	100.00%

=== Hamilton County ===
==== Circuit Court Judge ====
Republican nominee Alex McVeagh won with 57.6% of the vote, defeating Democratic nominee Kisha Cheeks.

Results

August 1, 2024 general election results
Party	Candidate	Votes	%
Republican	Alex McVeagh	20,732	57.61%
Democratic	Kisha Cheeks	15,257	42.39%
Total votes		35,989	100.00%

== Maps ==
Maps of the 2024 Tennessee general election

Change in turnout from 2020 (percentage)
Higher turnout: +0–2% +2–4% +4–6% +6–8%
Lower turnout: −0–2% −2–4% −4–6% −6–8% −8–10% <−10%

Change in turnout from 2020 (vote totals)
Each dot denotes a net change of 500 votes in either direction, rounded.
More votes Fewer votes

== See also ==
- Elections in Tennessee
- Political party strength in Tennessee
- Tennessee Democratic Party
- Tennessee Republican Party
- Government of Tennessee
- Tennessee Supreme Court
- 2024 United States elections
