= Beech Grove, Kentucky =

Beech Grove, Kentucky may refer to:

- Beech Grove, Bullitt County, Kentucky
- Beech Grove, Carter County, Kentucky
- Beech Grove, McLean County, Kentucky
