= Fred Atchley =

American politician (born 1968)

Member of the Tennessee House of Representatives from the 12th district
- Incumbent
- Assumed office January 14, 2025
- Preceded by: Dale Carr

Personal details
- Born: November 10, 1968 (age 58)
- Party: Republican
- Spouse: Angela
- Children: 4
- Occupation: Politician; firefighter
- Website: House website Campaign website

Fred Atchley (born November 10, 1968) is a retired firefighter and American politician. He is a Republican member of the Tennessee House of Representatives, representing the 12th district since 2025.

== Early life and education ==
Fred Atchley was born on November 10, 1968. In 1987, he graduated from Sevier County High School in Sevierville, Tennessee. He then attended training academies for law enforcement and firefighting, graduating in 1989 and 1992, respectively. In 2019, he completed a Certified Public Administrator program through the University of Tennessee.

== Career ==
Atchley worked for the Sevier County Sheriff’s Office for 17 years. He later joined the City of Sevierville Fire Department and retired in 2019 as a battalion chief. He served on the Sevier County Commission from 1998 to 2024, including as chair of the budget committee and vice-chair of the 911 board.

== Tennessee House of Representatives (2025–present) ==
=== Elections ===
In 2024, Atchley ran to represent the 12th district in the Tennessee House of Representatives, held by incumbent representative Dale Carr, who did not seek re-election. In the Republican primary, Atchley defeated two opponents by a wide margin. He then won the general election against Democratic candidate Leslie Braddock.

=== Tenure ===
In 2024, a few days after winning his initial election to the General Assembly, Atchley was elected by House Republicans to be assistant floor leader.

In 2025, Atchley broke from the Republican House majority to vote against a major expansion of the state's school voucher program. Later that year, he sponsored a measure to change the pay schedule for state employees from twice a month to biweekly.

In 2026, alongside Senator Steve Southerland, Atchley sponsored a bill making it a misdemeanor to feed black bears in areas designated by the state. The bill passed both chambers of the General Assembly and was signed into law by Bill Lee on April 14. Atchley additionally sponsored legislation to ban the retail sale of nitrous oxide, an addictive substance commonly used for dental procedures.

== Personal life ==
Atchley is married to his wife Angela. He has four children. He is a Baptist and attends the First Baptist Church of Sevierville.
