= Shady Grove, Trousdale County, Tennessee =

Shady Grove, Tennessee
- Unincorporated community
- Location within Tennessee Location within the United States
- Coordinates: 36°22′06″N 86°08′15″W
- Country: United States
- State: Tennessee
- County: Trousdale
- Elevation: 499 ft (152 m)
- Time zone: UTC-6 (Central (CST))
  - Summer (DST): UTC-5 (CDT)
- Area code: 615
- GNIS feature ID: 1301157

Shady Grove is a former unincorporated community in Trousdale County, Tennessee, United States. Shady Grove is 2.2 miles (3.5 km) southeast of downtown Hartsville. As Hartsville and Trousdale County form a consolidated city-county government, Shady Grove is under the jurisdiction of Hartsville.
