= Beech Grove, Virginia =

Unincorporated community in Virginia, US

Coordinates: 37°52′33″N 78°56′20″W

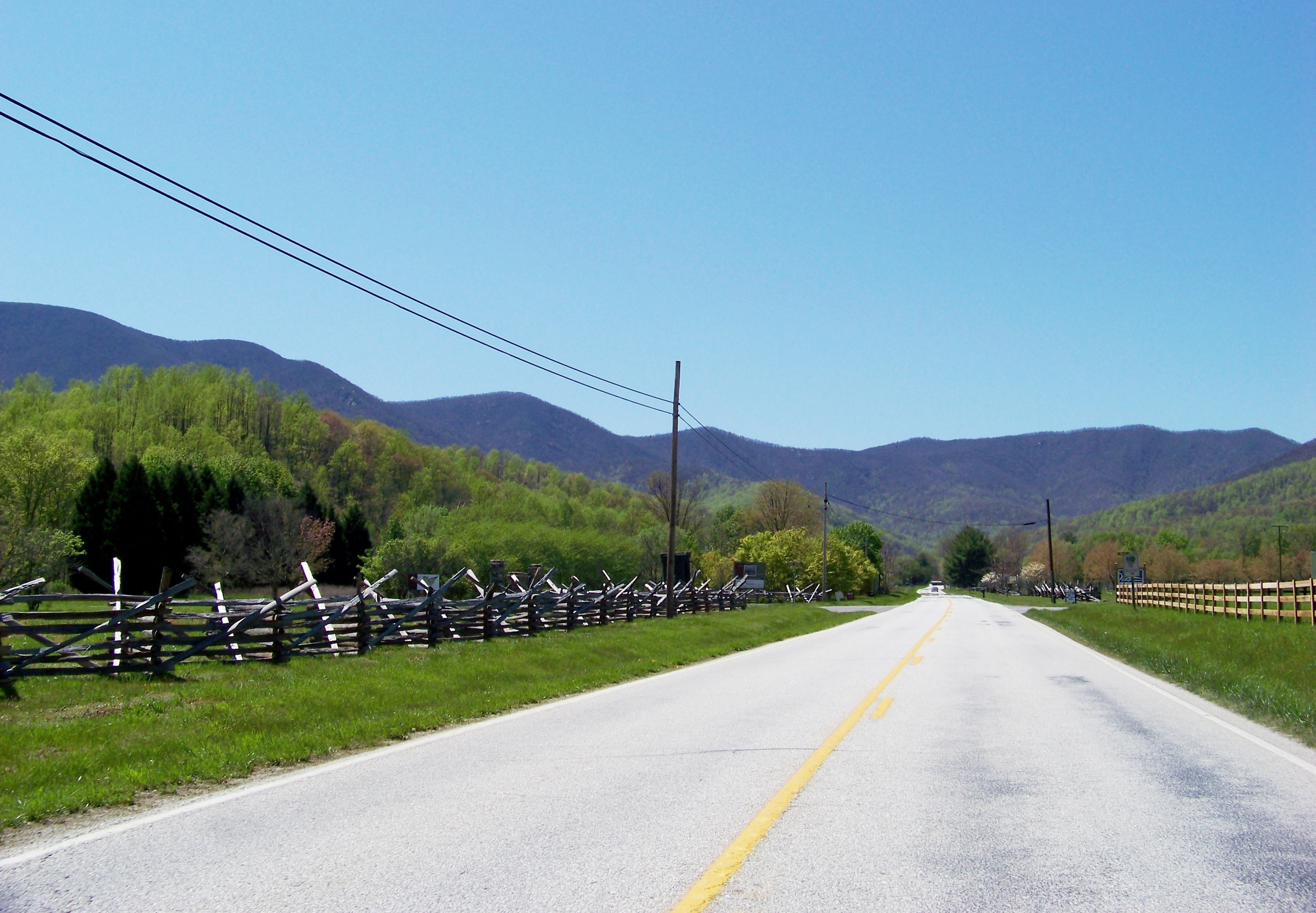
Beech Grove Road (Route 664)

Beech Grove is an unincorporated community in Nelson County, Virginia, United States.
