= Beech Grove, Knox County, Tennessee =

Unincorporated community in Tennessee, US

Coordinates: 36°08′43″N 83°54′52″W

Beech Grove is an unincorporated community in Knox County, Tennessee, in the United States.

== History ==
The community was named for the presence of beech trees near the town site.
