= Beech Grove, Bullitt County, Kentucky =

Unincorporated community in Kentucky, United States

Beech Grove, Kentucky
- Unincorporated community
- Location within Kentucky Location within the United States
- Coordinates: 37°56′02″N 85°45′21″W
- Country: United States
- State: Kentucky
- County: Bullitt
- Elevation: 449 ft (137 m)
- Time zone: UTC-5 (Eastern (EST))
  - Summer (DST): UTC-4 (EDT)
- Area code: 502
- GNIS feature ID: 507476

Beech Grove is an unincorporated community in Bullitt County, Kentucky, United States. The community is located along Kentucky Route 1494 4.4 miles (7.1 km) southwest of Shepherdsville.
