= Beech Grove, West Virginia =

Unincorporated community in West Virginia, United States

Beech Grove
- Unincorporated community
- Location within the state of West Virginia Beech Grove (the United States)
- Coordinates: 39°19′23″N 81°0′16″W
- Country: United States
- State: West Virginia
- County: Ritchie
- Elevation: 833 ft (254 m)
- Time zone: UTC-5 (Eastern (EST))
  - Summer (DST): UTC-4 (EDT)
- GNIS ID: 1553835

Beech Grove is an unincorporated community in Ritchie County, West Virginia, United States.
