= Beech Grove, Trousdale County, Tennessee =

Unincorporated community in Tennessee, US

Coordinates: 36°25′09″N 86°05′36″W

Beech Grove is an unincorporated community in Trousdale County, Tennessee, in the United States.

== History ==
The community was named from the presence of beech trees near the town site.
