= Richard Montgomery (politician) =

American politician (born 1946)

Member of the Tennessee House of Representatives from the 12th district
- In office January 12, 1999 – January 8, 2013
- Preceded by: Larry Huskey
- Succeeded by: Dale Carr

Personal details
- Born: October 24, 1946 (age 80) Sevierville, Tennessee, U.S.
- Party: Republican
- Spouse: Ann Montgomery
- Children: 1
- Education: University of Tennessee (BS)
- Website: House website

Richard Montgomery (born October 24, 1946, in Sevierville) is a Tennessee politician and was a member of the Tennessee House of Representatives for the 12th district from 2008 to 2012, which comprises part of Sevier County. He served as a state representative on the House Education Committee, the House Commerce Committee, the House Rules Committee, the House Utilities and Banking Subcommittee, the House K-12 Subcommittee, and the Joint Select Committee on Children and Youth. Before being elected to the Tennessee House of Representatives, he served on the Sevier County Board of Education for 16 years.

Richard Montgomery graduated from Seymour High School in Seymour Tennessee, attended Hiwassee Jr. College, and graduated from the University of Tennessee at Knoxville with a Bachelor of Science degree. He is retired from Oak Ridge National Laboratory. He was also a manager of Lockheed Martin Energy Resource.

Richard Montgomery is a member of the Republican Party. When he answered the 1998 Tennessee State Legislative National Political Awareness Test, he endorsed teachers leading voluntary prayer in public schools and sex education programs in public schools that stress abstinence. He supported ending parole for repeat violent felons and usage of the death penalty. On energy and the environment, he supported requiring an analysis of proposed environmental regulations' economic impact to determine their cost and benefit before those regulations could come into effect. He also supported requesting flexibility from the federal government in enforcing and funding federal environmental regulations.

Richard Montgomery married Anna LaVerne Houser Montgomery of Knoxville, Tennessee in 1974 and they have one child, Megan Ann Montgomery Miller.
