= 2024 United States presidential election in Tennessee =

- November 5, 2024
- Turnout: 64.04% (▼5.26 pp)

| Nominee | Donald Trump | Kamala Harris |
| Party | Republican | Democratic |
| Home state | Florida | California |
| Running mate | JD Vance | Tim Walz |
| Electoral vote | 11 | 0 |
| Popular vote | 1,966,865 | 1,056,265 |
| Percentage | 64.19% | 34.47% |

Trump
40–50%
50–60%
60–70%
70–80%
80–90%
90–100%
Harris
40–50%
50–60%
60–70%
70–80%
80–90%
90–100%
Tie/No data
40–50%
50%
President before election
Joe Biden
Democratic
Elected President
Donald Trump
Republican

The 2024 United States presidential election in Tennessee took place on Tuesday, November 5, 2024, as part of the 2024 United States elections in which all 50 states plus the District of Columbia participated. Tennessee voters have chosen electors to represent them in the Electoral College via a popular vote. The state of Tennessee has 11 electoral votes in the Electoral College, following reapportionment due to the 2020 United States census in which the state neither gained nor lost a seat.

Prior to the election, all major news organizations once again considered Tennessee a safe red state; the state has voted Republican in every presidential election since 2000, including by double-digit margins since 2004.

On election night, Tennessee voted decisively Republican for the third consecutive election, with former president Donald Trump winning 64.19% to Kamala Harris's 34.47%, a margin of 29.72%. This marked a considerable improvement over his 23.21% margin in 2020 and, to a lesser extent his 26.00% margin in 2016. He received more than 1.96 million votes in Tennessee, a record for any candidate in state history. This was the best performance by a Republican presidential candidate in Tennessee since Richard Nixon's 37.95% victory in 1972. Trump's vote share is also the fourth-highest for Republicans in state history, behind only 1864, 1868, and 1972.

== Primary elections ==
=== Democratic primary ===
The Tennessee Democratic primary was held on Super Tuesday, March 5, 2024. President Biden won the state in a landslide, earning all 63 pledged delegates

Popular vote share by county Biden: 80–90% >90%

2024 Tennessee Democratic pres. primary
| Candidate | Votes | % | Delegates |
|---|---|---|---|
| Joe Biden (incumbent) | 122,803 | 92.14 | 63 |
| Uncommitted | 10,475 | 7.86 | 0 |
| Total | 133,278 | 100% | 63 |

=== Republican primary ===
The Tennessee Republican primary was held on Super Tuesday, March 5, 2024. Former president Donald Trump was challenged by Nikki Haley, the only other major candidate remaining in the Republican primaries. Trump won the state in a landslide, defeating Haley by 57.8 points and earning all 58 delegates.

Popular vote share by county Trump: 60–70% 70–80% 80–90% >90%

Tennessee Republican primary, March 5, 2024
| Candidate | Votes | Percentage | Actual delegate count | | |
| Candidate | Votes | Percentage | Bound | Unbound | Total |
|---|---|---|---|---|---|
| Donald Trump | 446,850 | 77.33% | 58 | 0 | 58 |
| Nikki Haley | 112,958 | 19.55% | 0 | 0 | 0 |
| Ron DeSantis (withdrawn) | 7,947 | 1.38% | 0 | 0 | 0 |
| Uncommitted | 4,884 | 0.85% | 0 | 0 | 0 |
| Chris Christie (withdrawn) | 1,874 | 0.32% | 0 | 0 | 0 |
| Vivek Ramaswamy (withdrawn) | 1,714 | 0.30% | 0 | 0 | 0 |
| Ryan Binkley (withdrawn) | 722 | 0.13% | 0 | 0 | 0 |
| Asa Hutchinson (withdrawn) | 533 | 0.09% | 0 | 0 | 0 |
| David Stuckenberg | 352 | 0.06% | 0 | 0 | 0 |
| Total: | 577,834 | 100.00% | 58 | 0 | 58 |

== General election ==
=== Predictions ===
| Source | Ranking | As of |
|---|---|---|
| Cook Political Report | Solid R | December 19, 2023 |
| Inside Elections | Solid R | April 26, 2023 |
| Sabato's Crystal Ball | Safe R | June 29, 2023 |
| Decision Desk HQ/The Hill | Safe R | December 14, 2023 |
| CNalysis | Solid R | December 30, 2023 |
| CNN | Solid R | January 14, 2024 |
| The Economist | Safe R | June 12, 2024 |
| 538 | Solid R | June 11, 2024 |
| RCP | Solid R | June 26, 2024 |
| NBC News | Safe R | October 6, 2024 |

=== Polling ===
Donald Trump vs. Kamala Harris

| Poll source | Date(s) administered | Sample size (Note: Key: A – all adults RV – registered voters LV – likely voters V – unclear) | Margin of error | Donald Trump Republican | Kamala Harris Democratic | Other / Undecided |
|---|---|---|---|---|---|---|
| ActiVote | October 5−28, 2024 | 400 (LV) | ± 4.9% | 62% | 38% | – |
| ActiVote | September 24 – October 16, 2024 | 400 (LV) | ± 4.9% | 62% | 38% | – |
| ActiVote | July 26 – August 29, 2024 | 400 (LV) | ± 4.9% | 63% | 37% | – |

Donald Trump vs. Kamala Harris vs. Robert F. Kennedy Jr. vs. Cornel West vs. Jill Stein vs. Chase Oliver

| Poll source | Date(s) administered | Sample size | Margin of error | Donald Trump Republican | Kamala Harris Democratic | Robert F. Kennedy Jr. Independent | Cornel West Independent | Jill Stein Green | Chase Oliver Libertarian | Other / Undecided |
|---|---|---|---|---|---|---|---|---|---|---|
| Targoz Market Research (Note: Poll sponsored by the Beacon Center of Tennessee) | September 27 – October 8, 2024 | 1,200 (RV) | ± 2.8% | 54% | 35% | 5% | – | 1% | 1% | 4% |
| Targoz Market Research | September 27 – October 8, 2024 | 971 (LV) | ± 2.8% | 56% | 35% | 5% | – | 0% | 1% | 3% |

Hypothetical polling with Donald Trump and Joe Biden

Donald J. Trump vs. Joe Biden

| Poll source | Date(s) administered | Sample size | Margin of error | Donald Trump Republican | Joe Biden Democratic | Other / Undecided |
|---|---|---|---|---|---|---|
| John Zogby Strategies (Note: Poll conducted for Kennedy's campaign) | April 13–21, 2024 | 510 (LV) | – | 59% | 35% | 6% |
| Targoz Market Research | March 15 – April 2, 2024 | 1,139 (RV) | ± 2.8% | 60% | 31% | 9% |
| Targoz Market Research | March 15 – April 2, 2024 | 974 (LV) | ± 2.8% | 55% | 31% | 14% |
| Mainstreet Research/Florida Atlantic University | February 29 – March 3, 2024 | 216 (RV) | – | 58% | 34% | 8% (Note: "Another candidate" with 4%) |
| Mainstreet Research/Florida Atlantic University | February 29 – March 3, 2024 | 201 (LV) | – | 59% | 34% | 7% |
| Targoz Market Research | December 14–28, 2023 | 1,139 (RV) | ± 2.7% | 61% | 30% | 9% |
| Targoz Market Research | December 14–28, 2023 | 929 (LV) | ± 2.7% | 63% | 31% | 5% |
| Siena College (Note: Poll sponsored by The Tennessean) | November 5–10, 2023 | 805 (A) | ± 3.8% | 49% | 20% | 31% |
| Targoz Market Research | October 5–16, 2023 | 1,075 (RV) | ± 2.8% | 59% | 29% | 12% |
| Targoz Market Research | October 5–16, 2023 | 835 (LV) | ± 2.8% | 61% | 30% | 9% |
| Emerson College | October 1–4, 2023 | 410 (RV) | ± 4.8% | 55% | 22% | 23% |
| Targoz Market Research | June 14–22, 2023 | 1,120 (RV) | ± 2.9% | 51% | 32% | 17% |
| Targoz Market Research | June 14–22, 2023 | 1,046 (LV) | ± 2.9% | 54% | 34% | 11% |
| SSRS/Vanderbilt University | April 19–23, 2023 | 502 (RV) | – | 42% | 26% | 31% |

Donald Trump vs. Joe Biden vs. Robert F. Kennedy Jr.

| Poll source | Date(s) administered | Sample size | Margin of error | Donald Trump Republican | Joe Biden Democratic | Robert F. Kennedy Jr. Independent | Other / Undecided |
|---|---|---|---|---|---|---|---|
| Targoz Market Research | June 20 – July 1, 2024 | 1,152 (RV) | ± 2.8% | 55% | 28% | 7% | 10% |
| Targoz Market Research | June 20 – July 1, 2024 | 962 (LV) | ± 2.8% | 58% | 28% | 5% | 9% |
| SSRS/Vanderbilt University | April 26 – May 9, 2024 | 1,003 (RV) | ± 3.4% | 47% | 29% | 8% | 16% (Note: "Some other candidate" with 8%) |
| Targoz Market Research | March 15 – April 2, 2024 | 1,139 (RV) | ± 2.8% | 48% | 25% | 16% | 11% |
| Targoz Market Research | March 15 – April 2, 2024 | 974 (LV) | ± 2.8% | 47% | 28% | 15% | 10% |
| Targoz Market Research | December 14–28, 2023 | 1,187 (RV) | ± 2.7% | 48% | 23% | 17% | 12% |
| Targoz Market Research | December 14–28, 2023 | 929 (LV) | ± 2.7% | 51% | 25% | 16% | 8% |
| SSRS/Vanderbilt University | November 14 – December 2, 2023 | 1,005 (RV) | ± 3.4% | 45% | 26% | 12% | 17% |
| Targoz Market Research | October 5–16, 2023 | 1,164 (RV) | ± 2.8% | 46% | 18% | 22% | 14% |
| Targoz Market Research | October 5–16, 2023 | 872 (LV) | ± 2.8% | 48% | 23% | 19% | 10% |

Donald Trump vs. Joe Biden vs. Joe Manchin as an Independent

| Poll source | Date(s) administered | Sample size | Margin of error | Donald Trump Republican | Joe Biden Democratic | Joe Manchin Independent | Other / Undecided |
|---|---|---|---|---|---|---|---|
| Targoz Market Research | October 5–16, 2023 | 1,118 (RV) | ± 2.8% | 52% | 21% | 5% | 22% |
| Targoz Market Research | October 5–16, 2023 | 844 (LV) | ± 2.8% | 53% | 23% | 6% | 18% |

Hypothetical polling with other candidates

Donald Trump vs. Robert F. Kennedy Jr.

| Poll source | Date(s) administered | Sample size | Margin of error | Donald Trump Republican | Robert Kennedy Jr. Independent | Other / Undecided |
|---|---|---|---|---|---|---|
| John Zogby Strategies | April 13–21, 2024 | 510 (LV) | – | 52% | 35% | 13% |

Robert F. Kennedy Jr. vs. Joe Biden

| Poll source | Date(s) administered | Sample size | Margin of error | Robert Kennedy Jr. Independent | Joe Biden Democratic | Other / Undecided |
|---|---|---|---|---|---|---|
| John Zogby Strategies | April 13–21, 2024 | 510 (LV) | – | 55% | 31% | 14% |

Ron DeSantis vs. Joe Biden

| Poll source | Date(s) administered | Sample size | Margin of error | Ron DeSantis Republican | Joe Biden Democratic | Other / Undecided |
|---|---|---|---|---|---|---|
| Targoz Market Research | June 14–22, 2023 | 1,120 (RV) | ± 2.9% | 46% | 32% | 22% |
| Targoz Market Research | June 14–22, 2023 | 977 (LV) | ± 2.9% | 52% | 36% | 11% |
| SSRS/Vanderbilt University | April 19–23, 2023 | 502 (RV) | – | 33% | 24% | 40% |

=== Electoral slates ===
The following individuals were nominated as presidential electors: (Note: Under Tennessee law, only "statewide political parties" (those polling at least 5% in a prior statewide election) are granted automatic ballot access under their party name. All other candidates must qualify as independents by submitting a petition with the required number of signatures from registered voters.)

| Donald Trump and JD Vance Republican Party | Kamala Harris and Tim Walz Democratic Party | Robert F. Kennedy Jr. and Nicole Shanahan Independent | Jill Stein and Samson LeBeau Kpadenou Green Party | Jay Bowman and De Bowman Independent | Claudia De la Cruz and Karina Garcia Socialism and Liberation | Rachele Fruit and Dennis Richter Socialist Workers |
|---|---|---|---|---|---|---|
| Linda D. Buckles; Jane Chedester; Emily Beaty; Jim Sandman; Ron McDow; Terri Nicholson; Larry Hillis; Lee Mills; Tina McElravey; Lee Beaman; Charlotte Kelley | Maria Brewer; Marisa Richmond; Freda Player; John Deane; Brad Batt; Makayla McCree; Jack Vaughan; Civil Miller-Watkins; Frank Maurizio; Gale Jones Carson; Rupa Blackwell | Leslie Anne Salerno; Nathan D. Keeble; Frances K. Hensley; Heather Cecile Williams; Randall Robinson; William Howard Price; Christopher Myers; Ryan Thomas Foley; Katherine G. Hutcheson; Christian B. Currey; Rolf S. Hazlehurst | Elizabeth Layton; Martin Pleasant; Penny Gharanfoli; Michael Principe; Eric Lewis; Bruce Jackson; Elizabeth Dachowski; Richard E. Griffith Jr.; Christian Maiorino; Martin Holsinger; John P. Miglietta | Shelia Anglin; Jennifer Townsend; Rachid Benayyad; Stephen McPeake; Jessica Ridenour; Genie Foster; Salah Hneen; Robert Bartlett; Frank Nelson; James Terry Bartlett; Paula Reeves | Matthew Pierce; Erin Sweeney; Noah Abbas; Dutsch Dorman; Craig Bardo; Tristan Warner; Matt Shaw; John LaDue; Kadin Greer; Anna Hinkle; John Carico | Bobby L. Jonas; Faith Hutchison; Ernest Edwin Wells; Gabriella Distretti; Joshua E. Shevlin; Clarence Terry; Rayshaun Reece; Cody Rocha; Tammy Dorotzak; Jacqueline Buggs; Carletta Powell |

=== Results ===
State Senate district results (27–6): Trump 50–60% 60–70% 70–80% 80–90% / Harris 50–60% 60–70% 70–80% 80–90%

State House district results (75–24): Trump 50–60% 60–70% 70–80% 80–90% / Harris 50–60% 60–70% 70–80% 80–90%

2024 United States presidential election in Tennessee
| Party | Candidate | Votes | % | ±% |
|---|---|---|---|---|
| Republican | Donald Trump; JD Vance | 1,966,865 | 64.19% | +3.53% |
| Democratic | Kamala Harris; Tim Walz | 1,056,265 | 34.47% | −2.98% |
| Independent | Robert F. Kennedy Jr. (withdrawn); Nicole Shanahan (withdrawn) | 21,535 | 0.70% | N/A |
| Green | Jill Stein (Note: Listed on the ballot without party affiliation.); Samson Kpadenou (Note: Replacement for Butch Ware, Stein's vice presidential nominee.) | 8,967 | 0.29% | +0.14% |
| Independent | Jay Bowman; De Bowman | 5,865 | 0.19% | N/A |
| Socialism and Liberation | Claudia De la Cruz; Karina Garcia | 3,457 | 0.11% | +0.03% |
| Socialist Workers | Rachele Fruit; Dennis Richter | 988 | 0.03% | −0.05% |
| Total votes | | 3,063,942 | 100.00% | |
| Republican hold | | | | |

==== By county ====
| County | Donald Trump Republican | | Kamala Harris Democratic | | Various candidates Other parties | | Margin | | Total |
| County | # | % | # | % | # | % | # | % | Total |
|---|---|---|---|---|---|---|---|---|---|
| Anderson | 24,582 | 67.26% | 11,525 | 31.53% | 441 | 1.21% | 13,057 | 35.73% | 36,548 |
| Bedford | 15,772 | 78.51% | 4,122 | 20.52% | 196 | 0.97% | 11,650 | 57.99% | 20,090 |
| Benton | 5,886 | 81.07% | 1,317 | 18.14% | 57 | 0.79% | 4,569 | 62.93% | 7,260 |
| Bledsoe | 5,254 | 84.87% | 891 | 14.39% | 46 | 0.74% | 4,363 | 70.48% | 6,191 |
| Blount | 50,699 | 73.24% | 17,664 | 25.52% | 861 | 1.24% | 33,035 | 47.72% | 69,224 |
| Bradley | 38,836 | 78.86% | 9,852 | 20.01% | 558 | 1.13% | 28,984 | 58.85% | 49,246 |
| Campbell | 13,115 | 84.46% | 2,305 | 14.84% | 108 | 0.70% | 10,810 | 69.62% | 15,528 |
| Cannon | 5,682 | 82.58% | 1,132 | 16.45% | 67 | 0.97% | 4,550 | 66.13% | 6,881 |
| Carroll | 9,547 | 80.35% | 2,233 | 18.79% | 102 | 0.86% | 7,314 | 61.56% | 11,882 |
| Carter | 20,167 | 81.15% | 4,454 | 17.92% | 231 | 0.93% | 15,713 | 63.23% | 24,852 |
| Cheatham | 14,987 | 72.26% | 5,464 | 26.34% | 290 | 1.40% | 9,523 | 45.92% | 20,741 |
| Chester | 6,206 | 81.91% | 1,286 | 16.97% | 85 | 1.12% | 4,920 | 64.94% | 7,577 |
| Claiborne | 11,463 | 84.70% | 1,971 | 14.56% | 100 | 0.74% | 9,492 | 70.14% | 13,534 |
| Clay | 3,117 | 82.90% | 614 | 16.33% | 29 | 0.77% | 2,503 | 66.57% | 3,760 |
| Cocke | 13,105 | 83.67% | 2,415 | 15.42% | 143 | 0.91% | 10,690 | 68.25% | 15,663 |
| Coffee | 19,174 | 76.91% | 5,440 | 21.82% | 318 | 1.27% | 13,734 | 55.09% | 24,932 |
| Crockett | 4,674 | 78.94% | 1,196 | 20.20% | 51 | 0.86% | 3,478 | 58.74% | 5,921 |
| Cumberland | 27,399 | 79.09% | 6,996 | 20.20% | 247 | 0.71% | 20,403 | 58.89% | 34,642 |
| Davidson | 102,256 | 35.26% | 181,862 | 62.70% | 5,918 | 2.04% | −79,606 | −27.44% | 290,036 |
| Decatur | 4,596 | 84.08% | 819 | 14.98% | 51 | 0.94% | 3,777 | 69.10% | 5,466 |
| DeKalb | 7,599 | 80.87% | 1,706 | 18.16% | 91 | 0.97% | 5,893 | 62.71% | 9,396 |
| Dickson | 19,002 | 75.39% | 5,913 | 23.46% | 289 | 1.15% | 13,089 | 51.93% | 25,204 |
| Dyer | 11,603 | 80.61% | 2,707 | 18.81% | 84 | 0.58% | 8,896 | 61.80% | 14,394 |
| Fayette | 16,756 | 70.71% | 6,720 | 28.36% | 220 | 0.93% | 10,036 | 42.35% | 23,696 |
| Fentress | 8,555 | 87.56% | 1,149 | 11.76% | 67 | 0.68% | 7,406 | 75.80% | 9,771 |
| Franklin | 15,016 | 76.12% | 4,529 | 22.96% | 183 | 0.92% | 10,487 | 53.16% | 19,728 |
| Gibson | 16,346 | 75.51% | 5,100 | 23.56% | 202 | 0.93% | 11,246 | 51.95% | 21,648 |
| Giles | 10,394 | 77.07% | 2,974 | 22.05% | 119 | 0.88% | 7,420 | 55.02% | 13,487 |
| Grainger | 9,630 | 86.52% | 1,432 | 12.87% | 68 | 0.61% | 8,198 | 73.65% | 11,130 |
| Greene | 25,586 | 82.28% | 5,145 | 16.55% | 364 | 1.17% | 20,441 | 65.73% | 31,095 |
| Grundy | 5,334 | 84.29% | 948 | 14.98% | 46 | 0.73% | 4,386 | 69.31% | 6,328 |
| Hamblen | 20,154 | 79.03% | 5,132 | 20.12% | 215 | 0.85% | 15,022 | 58.91% | 25,501 |
| Hamilton | 97,195 | 55.72% | 74,437 | 42.67% | 2,806 | 1.61% | 22,758 | 13.05% | 174,438 |
| Hancock | 2,558 | 87.96% | 334 | 11.49% | 16 | 0.55% | 2,224 | 76.47% | 2,908 |
| Hardeman | 5,793 | 61.63% | 3,527 | 37.53% | 79 | 0.84% | 2,266 | 24.10% | 9,399 |
| Hardin | 10,293 | 85.11% | 1,704 | 14.09% | 97 | 0.80% | 8,589 | 71.02% | 12,094 |
| Hawkins | 22,066 | 84.01% | 3,987 | 15.18% | 213 | 0.81% | 18,079 | 68.83% | 26,266 |
| Haywood | 3,286 | 49.40% | 3,311 | 49.77% | 55 | 0.83% | −25 | −0.37% | 6,652 |
| Henderson | 10,083 | 83.70% | 1,902 | 15.79% | 62 | 0.51% | 8,181 | 67.91% | 12,047 |
| Henry | 11,629 | 77.14% | 3,286 | 21.80% | 161 | 1.06% | 8,343 | 55.34% | 15,076 |
| Hickman | 8,265 | 80.17% | 1,968 | 19.09% | 76 | 0.74% | 6,297 | 61.08% | 10,309 |
| Houston | 2,989 | 78.45% | 773 | 20.29% | 48 | 1.26% | 2,216 | 58.16% | 3,810 |
| Humphreys | 6,400 | 77.44% | 1,767 | 21.38% | 97 | 1.18% | 4,633 | 56.06% | 8,264 |
| Jackson | 4,586 | 80.80% | 1,040 | 18.32% | 50 | 0.88% | 3,546 | 62.48% | 5,676 |
| Jefferson | 21,068 | 81.61% | 4,503 | 17.44% | 244 | 0.95% | 16,565 | 64.17% | 25,815 |
| Johnson | 6,829 | 84.29% | 1,212 | 14.96% | 61 | 0.75% | 5,617 | 69.33% | 8,102 |
| Knox | 130,815 | 58.96% | 87,516 | 39.45% | 3,533 | 1.59% | 43,299 | 19.51% | 221,864 |
| Lake | 1,493 | 77.00% | 429 | 22.12% | 17 | 0.88% | 1,064 | 54.88% | 1,939 |
| Lauderdale | 5,633 | 68.15% | 2,571 | 31.10% | 62 | 0.75% | 3,062 | 37.05% | 8,266 |
| Lawrence | 16,429 | 84.11% | 2,939 | 15.05% | 165 | 0.84% | 13,490 | 69.06% | 19,533 |
| Lewis | 4,852 | 82.38% | 991 | 16.83% | 47 | 0.79% | 3,861 | 65.55% | 5,890 |
| Lincoln | 13,208 | 81.89% | 2,782 | 17.25% | 138 | 0.86% | 10,426 | 64.64% | 16,128 |
| Loudon | 25,226 | 75.96% | 7,625 | 22.96% | 358 | 1.08% | 17,601 | 53.00% | 33,209 |
| Macon | 8,958 | 86.69% | 1,277 | 12.36% | 98 | 0.95% | 7,681 | 74.33% | 10,333 |
| Madison | 23,385 | 58.52% | 16,115 | 40.32% | 464 | 1.16% | 7,270 | 18.20% | 39,964 |
| Marion | 10,788 | 77.43% | 3,026 | 21.72% | 119 | 0.85% | 7,762 | 55.71% | 13,933 |
| Marshall | 12,426 | 77.85% | 3,390 | 21.24% | 146 | 0.91% | 9,036 | 56.61% | 15,962 |
| Maury | 37,376 | 71.75% | 14,145 | 27.15% | 569 | 1.10% | 23,231 | 44.60% | 52,090 |
| McMinn | 19,673 | 81.73% | 4,207 | 17.48% | 192 | 0.79% | 15,466 | 64.25% | 24,072 |
| McNairy | 9,437 | 83.76% | 1,727 | 15.33% | 103 | 0.91% | 7,710 | 68.43% | 11,267 |
| Meigs | 5,085 | 83.37% | 968 | 15.87% | 46 | 0.76% | 4,117 | 67.50% | 6,099 |
| Monroe | 18,526 | 82.99% | 3,608 | 16.16% | 189 | 0.85% | 14,918 | 66.83% | 22,323 |
| Montgomery | 47,795 | 58.46% | 32,736 | 40.04% | 1,224 | 1.50% | 15,059 | 18.42% | 81,755 |
| Moore | 3,060 | 83.74% | 542 | 14.83% | 52 | 1.43% | 2,518 | 68.91% | 3,654 |
| Morgan | 7,427 | 86.76% | 1,054 | 12.31% | 79 | 0.93% | 6,373 | 74.45% | 8,560 |
| Obion | 10,596 | 82.14% | 2,221 | 17.22% | 83 | 0.64% | 8,375 | 64.92% | 12,900 |
| Overton | 9,042 | 81.69% | 1,931 | 17.45% | 96 | 0.86% | 7,111 | 64.24% | 11,069 |
| Perry | 3,139 | 84.47% | 558 | 15.02% | 19 | 0.51% | 2,581 | 69.45% | 3,716 |
| Pickett | 2,441 | 82.63% | 487 | 16.49% | 26 | 0.88% | 1,954 | 66.14% | 2,954 |
| Polk | 7,302 | 83.67% | 1,356 | 15.54% | 69 | 0.79% | 5,946 | 68.13% | 8,727 |
| Putnam | 25,554 | 73.14% | 8,991 | 25.73% | 394 | 1.13% | 16,563 | 47.41% | 34,939 |
| Rhea | 11,974 | 82.90% | 2,312 | 16.01% | 158 | 1.09% | 9,662 | 66.89% | 14,444 |
| Roane | 21,011 | 76.65% | 6,073 | 22.15% | 328 | 1.20% | 14,938 | 54.50% | 27,412 |
| Robertson | 26,260 | 74.88% | 8,428 | 24.03% | 382 | 1.09% | 17,832 | 50.85% | 35,070 |
| Rutherford | 88,811 | 60.15% | 56,656 | 38.37% | 2,189 | 1.48% | 32,155 | 21.78% | 147,656 |
| Scott | 8,608 | 89.62% | 942 | 9.81% | 55 | 0.57% | 7,666 | 79.81% | 9,605 |
| Sequatchie | 6,522 | 82.66% | 1,292 | 16.38% | 76 | 0.96% | 5,230 | 66.28% | 7,890 |
| Sevier | 35,207 | 80.07% | 8,322 | 18.93% | 441 | 1.00% | 26,885 | 61.14% | 43,970 |
| Shelby | 118,917 | 36.42% | 201,759 | 61.80% | 5,821 | 1.78% | −82,842 | −25.38% | 326,497 |
| Smith | 7,655 | 81.99% | 1,595 | 17.08% | 86 | 0.93% | 6,060 | 64.91% | 9,336 |
| Stewart | 5,389 | 81.40% | 1,160 | 17.52% | 71 | 1.08% | 4,229 | 63.88% | 6,620 |
| Sullivan | 58,154 | 76.98% | 16,624 | 22.01% | 763 | 1.01% | 41,530 | 54.97% | 75,541 |
| Sumner | 68,767 | 70.34% | 27,874 | 28.51% | 1,120 | 1.15% | 40,893 | 41.83% | 97,761 |
| Tipton | 20,303 | 75.95% | 6,178 | 23.11% | 252 | 0.94% | 14,125 | 52.84% | 26,733 |
| Trousdale | 3,359 | 79.02% | 856 | 20.14% | 36 | 0.84% | 2,503 | 58.88% | 4,251 |
| Unicoi | 6,876 | 80.51% | 1,578 | 18.48% | 87 | 1.01% | 5,298 | 62.03% | 8,541 |
| Union | 7,384 | 85.18% | 1,216 | 14.03% | 69 | 0.79% | 6,168 | 71.15% | 8,669 |
| Van Buren | 2,718 | 83.25% | 524 | 16.05% | 23 | 0.70% | 2,194 | 67.20% | 3,265 |
| Warren | 13,192 | 77.53% | 3,647 | 21.43% | 176 | 1.04% | 9,545 | 56.10% | 17,015 |
| Washington | 42,299 | 69.08% | 18,131 | 29.61% | 804 | 1.31% | 24,168 | 39.47% | 61,234 |
| Wayne | 6,016 | 88.07% | 762 | 11.16% | 53 | 0.77% | 5,254 | 76.91% | 6,831 |
| Weakley | 10,541 | 78.70% | 2,725 | 20.34% | 128 | 0.96% | 7,816 | 58.36% | 13,394 |
| White | 10,717 | 82.88% | 2,105 | 16.28% | 109 | 0.84% | 8,612 | 66.60% | 12,931 |
| Williamson | 94,562 | 65.36% | 47,695 | 32.97% | 2,411 | 1.67% | 46,867 | 32.39% | 144,668 |
| Wilson | 56,425 | 69.44% | 23,855 | 29.36% | 974 | 1.20% | 32,570 | 40.08% | 81,254 |
| Totals | 1,966,865 | 64.19% | 1,056,265 | 34.47% | 40,812 | 1.34% | 910,600 | 29.72% | 3,063,942 |

==== By congressional district ====
Trump won eight of nine congressional districts.

| District | Trump | Harris | Representative |
|---|---|---|---|
| 1st | 78.41% | 20.57% | Diana Harshbarger |
| 2nd | 66.24% | 32.38% | Tim Burchett |
| 3rd | 67.29% | 31.40% | Chuck Fleischmann |
| 4th | 71.19% | 27.61% | Scott DesJarlais |
| 5th | 58.15% | 40.25% | Andy Ogles |
| 6th | 66.96% | 31.80% | John W. Rose |
| 7th | 60.34% | 38.20% | Mark E. Green |
| 8th | 70.21% | 28.66% | David Kustoff |
| 9th | 27.81% | 70.40% | Steve Cohen |

== Analysis ==
A Southern state in the Bible Belt, no Democrat has won Tennessee's electoral votes since Bill Clinton of neighboring Arkansas, who shared the ticket with Al Gore in 1996, nor has it been contested at the presidential level since 2000, when Gore lost his home state by less than 4 points. The last Democratic presidential candidate to win at least 40% of the state vote was Barack Obama in 2008, and Republicans have occupied all statewide offices in Tennessee since 2011.

Tennessee handed Republican Donald Trump a decisive victory, doing so by a margin of 910,600 votes, making it his third-largest state win in terms of vote count, following Texas and Florida, which are also in the South. This election marks the third consecutive cycle in which a presidential candidate secured over 60% of the Tennessean vote. Notably, Trump improved his margins in every county and gained significant support across all demographics, performing better in rural, exurban, suburban, and urban areas. The state swung 6.51 points more Republican from 2020 to 2024.

Trump was able to increase his support in the Nashville metropolitan area, particularly in the suburban counties of Williamson, Rutherford, Wilson, and Sumner, performing similarly to his 2016 results. He gained ground in every county and even recaptured support in the Democratic strongholds of Shelby and Davidson Counties, home to Memphis and Nashville, as well as in the Republican strongholds of Hamilton, Knox, and Montgomery Counties, home to Chattanooga, Knoxville, and Clarksville.

Trump also came close to flipping majority-Black Haywood County, losing it by just 25 votes. Notably, Haywood County voted Republican in the Senate and congressional race on the same ballot. This was the closest the county has come to voting Republican in a presidential race since 1972.

2024 is the third consecutive election in which the Democratic candidate won 3 counties in Tennessee—Davidson, Haywood, and Shelby—while Trump took the other 92.

=== By Grand Division ===
Results by Grand Division Trump: 50–60% 60–70% 70–80%

Trump won all three of Tennessee's Grand Divisions—West, Middle, and East Tennessee. Middle and East Tennessee are solidly Republican, while West Tennessee, owing to its high Black population, was formerly loyal to the Democrats. It has become competitive for Republicans in recent elections. In 2020, Trump had won it with 49.43% to Biden's 49.06%. Democrats had previously won West Tennessee in 2004, 2008, and 2012.

| Grand Division | Donald Trump | | Kamala Harris | | Other | | Margin | | Total |
| Grand Division | # | % | # | % | # | % | # | % | Total |
|---|---|---|---|---|---|---|---|---|---|
| West | 317,003 | 53.36% | 268,833 | 45.25% | 8,236 | 1.39% | 48,170 | 8.11% | 594,072 |
| Middle | 823,801 | 62.84% | 468,619 | 35.75% | 18,564 | 1.42% | 355,182 | 27.09% | 1,310,984 |
| East | 826,061 | 71.28% | 318,813 | 27.51% | 14,012 | 1.21% | 507,248 | 43.77% | 1,158,886 |

=== Nashville Metropolitan Area ===
Precinct results Trump: 40–50%; 50–60%; 60–70%; 70–80%; 80–90%; Harris: 40–50% 50–60% 60–70% 70–80%; 80–90%; ≥90%

The Nashville metropolitan area, which includes urban Davidson County (home to Tennessee’s state capital Nashville), along with the suburban counties of Rutherford, Sumner, Williamson, and Wilson; the exurban counties of Cheatham, Maury, and Robertson; and the rural counties of Cannon, Dickson, Hickman, Macon, Smith, and Trousdale, voted as follows:

In Davidson County, Kamala Harris received 62.7% of the vote. The county had not supported a Republican presidential candidate since George H. W. Bush in 1988. Notably, Donald Trump performed well in some of Nashville's urban core. He lost Downtown Nashville, home to landmarks like Broadway and the Country Music Hall of Fame and Museum, by only 7.8%—a significant improvement from his 24.6% loss there in 2020. Trump's strongest performance in Davidson County came from its rural northern areas, such as Joelton. He also won in parts of southern Davidson County, including suburban areas like Forest Hills and Belle Meade.

The surrounding counties around Davidson voted heavily for Trump. He received high raw vote totals in Rutherford, Sumner, Williamson, and Wilson counties, all of which ranked among the fastest-growing areas of Tennessee in 2023. In Rutherford County, Trump carried the city of Murfreesboro by 15.4%. Across the Nashville metropolitan area, Trump received 58.0% of the vote, while Harris received 40.5%.

=== Hamilton County ===
Precinct results Trump: 40–50%; 50–60%; 60–70%; 70–80%; 80–90%; Harris: 40–50% 50–60% 60–70% 70–80%; 80–90%; ≥90%

Hamilton County, home to Chattanooga, voted somewhat comfortably for Donald Trump, who received 55.7% of the vote. The last Democrat to win the county was Harry S. Truman in 1948, although George Wallace did win a plurality in 1968. Kamala Harris won Chattanooga’s city limits by a 14.2% margin of victory. However, this was a decline from Joe Biden’s 18.8% margin during the 2020 election. Trump improved on his previous performance in the county, returning it to a double-digit margin after winning by only a single-digit margin in 2020.

Trump’s strength came from the suburban and mainly rural areas of Hamilton County, which outweighed Democratic support in the city. Outside Chattanooga, he dominated nearly all precincts, with his strongest performance in the northern and eastern rural parts of the county.

=== Knox County ===
Precinct results Trump: 40–50%; 50–60%; 60–70%; 70–80%; 80–90%; Harris: 40–50% 50–60% 60–70% 70–80%; 80–90%; ≥90%; Tie No data

Knox County, home to Knoxville, voted comfortably for Donald Trump, who received 59.0% of the vote. This continued the county’s long-standing streak of not supporting a Democratic presidential candidate since Franklin D. Roosevelt in 1940. Kamala Harris won Knoxville’s city limits by a 11.4% margin of victory. However, this was a decline from Joe Biden’s 16.0% margin during the 2020 election.

Trump's victory in Knox County was largely driven by his overwhelming support in the suburban and rural areas, which offset Harris’s strength in the urban core. Outside of Knoxville, Trump dominated nearly all precincts, with his strongest showing in the rural northern parts of the county.

=== Montgomery County ===
Precinct results Trump: 40–50%; 50–60%; 60–70%; 70–80%; 80–90%; Harris: 40–50% 50–60%

Montgomery County, home to Clarksville and Fort Campbell, voted comfortably for Donald Trump, who received 58.5% of the vote. The county has not supported a Democratic presidential candidate since Bill Clinton in 1996.

Clarksville’s urban core, including its diverse neighborhoods and precincts, showed competitive support for Kamala Harris. However, other precincts outside the urban core offset that Democratic strength, helping Trump carry the city by a 6.2% margin, an improvement from his narrow 0.4% margin in 2020. Most of the rural and suburban areas of the county, such as Cunningham, Palmyra, Port Royal, Sango, and Southside voted overwhelmingly for Trump, contributing to his comfortable overall lead in the county.

=== Shelby County ===
Precinct results Harris: 40–50% 50–60% 60–70% 70–80%; 80–90%; ≥90%; Trump: 40–50%; 50–60%; 60–70%; 70–80%; No data

Shelby County, home to Memphis, and the most populated county in Tennessee voted decisively for Kamala Harris, who received 61.8% of the vote. The county has not supported a Republican presidential candidate since George H. W. Bush in 1988. Harris’s win in the county was driven largely by the predominantly black, Democratic-leaning population of Memphis, which forms the county's urban core.

Trump performed best in Shelby County’s eastern white suburbs, including Bartlett, Collierville, and Germantown which tend to lean more conservative. He also did well in northern parts of the county, including Millington.

== See also ==
- United States presidential elections in Tennessee
- 2024 United States presidential election
- 2024 Democratic Party presidential primaries
- 2024 Republican Party presidential primaries
- 2024 United States Senate election in Tennessee
- 2024 Tennessee elections
- 2024 United States elections

== Notes ==
Partisan clients
