= Beech Grove (Nashville, Tennessee) =

Historic house in Tennessee, United States

- U.S. National Register of Historic Places
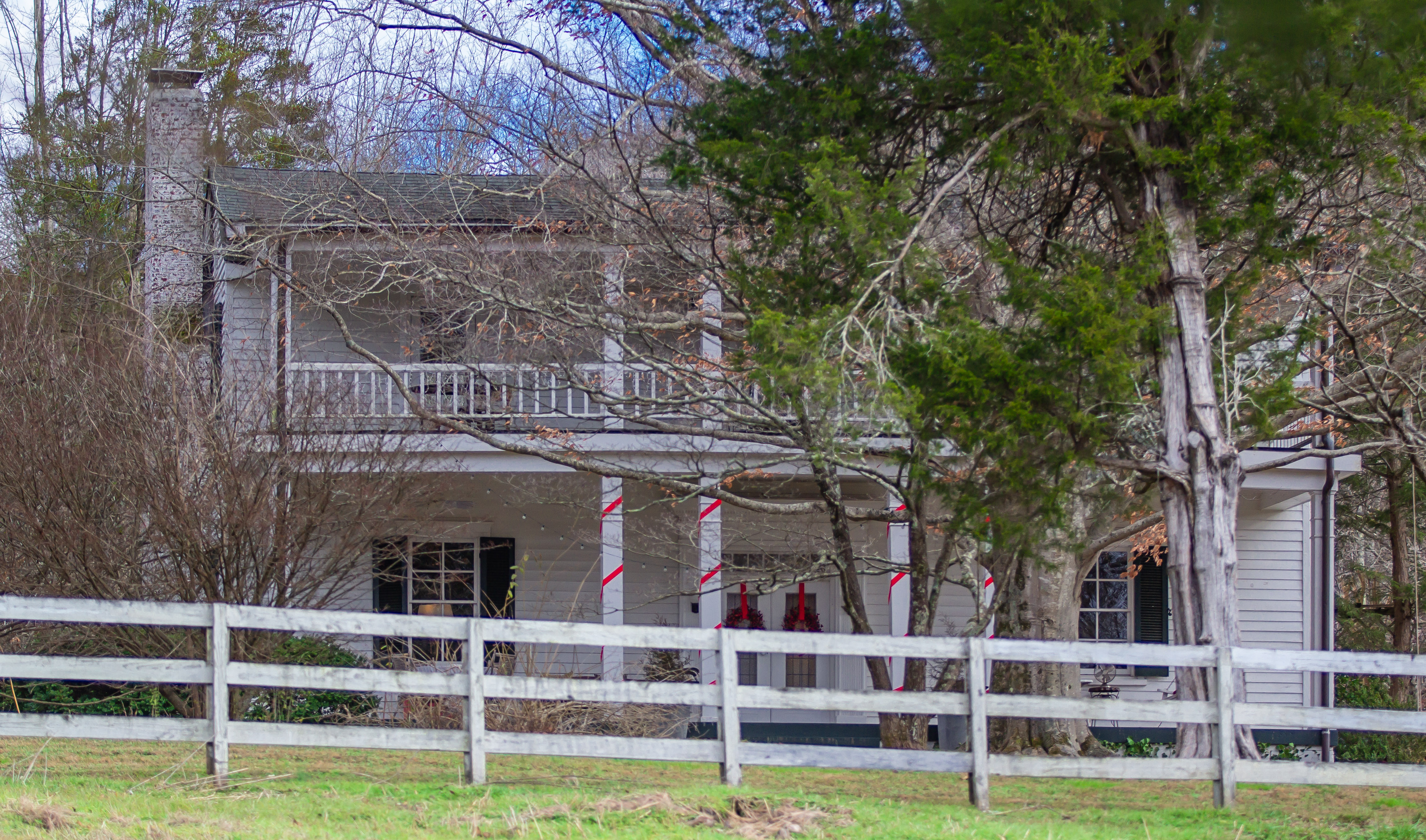
- Beech Grove

- Location within Tennessee Location within the United States
- Location: 8423 Old Harding Pike, Nashville, Tennessee, U.S.
- Coordinates: 36.0233°N 87.0229°W
- Area: 12 acres (4.9 ha)
- Built: c. 1850
- Built by: Thomas Jones and Caleb Lucas
- Architectural style: Colonial Revival
- MPS: Historic Family Farms in Middle Tennessee MPS
- NRHP reference No.: 07001163
- Added to NRHP: November 8, 2007

Beech Grove is a historic mansion in Nashville, Tennessee. Built as a log house circa 1850, it was a Southern plantation with African slaves in the Antebellum era. In the 1910s, it became a livestock farm.

== Location ==
The property is located at 8423 Old Harding Pike in Nashville, the county seat of Davidson County, Tennessee.

== History ==
The land belonged to Elisha Sherrill until 1801, when Hugh Allison acquired 200 acres. Allison, who served on the Davidson County Court, owned ten African slaves. He lived on the farm with his wife, Lydia Harrison Allison, and their five children. When he died in 1835, one of his sons, Thomas Jefferson Allison, inherited the farm. He acquired more land, expanding to 1,150 acres. Additionally, he owned 22 African slaves by 1840 and 53 slaves by 1860. As a result, the farm became a Southern plantation. Allison lived on the plantation with his wife Tabitha and their six children.

The two-storey log house was built for the Allison family by Thomas Jones and Caleb Lucas, two carpenters, circa 1850. It was designed in the Greek Revival architecture.

During the Civil War, half the slaves ran away via the railroad. After the war, the remaining 20 former slaves, now freedmen, worked on the property as tenant farmers. Meanwhile, Allison and his wife continued to live in the house until he died in 1897 and she died in 1910.

Subsequently, the property was inherited by Allison's granddaughter, Allie Morton and her husband, Sam. They turned it into a livestock farm. In the 1920s, they redesigned the house in the Colonial Revival architectural style. The Mortons sold the house in 1975. It was later purchased by the Kacki family in 1993.

== Architectural significance ==
It has been listed on the National Register of Historic Places since November 8, 2007.
