= Dale Carr (politician) =

American politician (born 1954)

Member of the Tennessee House of Representatives from the 12th district
- In office January 8, 2013 – January 14, 2025
- Preceded by: Richard Montgomery
- Succeeded by: Fred Atchley

Personal details
- Born: August 4, 1954 (age 71) Sevierville, Tennessee, U.S.
- Party: Republican
- Spouse: Jo Ann Carr
- Children: 1
- Website: House website

Dale Carr (born August 4, 1954) is an American politician. A member of the Republican Party, he represented the 12th district in the Tennessee House of Representatives from 2013 to 2025. Previously, he was an alderman in Sevierville.

== Political career ==
Carr was an alderman in Sevierville, TN from 2008 to 2012.

In 2012, he challenged incumbent Richard Montgomery in the Republican primary election to represent the 12th district in Tennessee's House of Representatives. He narrowly won the primary, with 50.6% of the vote, and was unopposed in the general election. He is now serving his fourth term in that seat, and is running for election to a fifth term in 2020.

Carr currently sits on the following House committees:

- Property & Planning Subcommittee (Chair)
- Transportation Committee
- Safety & Funding Subcommittee
- Naming, Designating, & Private Acts Committee
- Local Committee

On June 9, 2020, Carr voted as a member of the House Naming, Designating, & Private Acts Committee against removal of a bust honoring Ku Klux Klan Grand Wizard Nathan Bedford Forrest from the Tennessee State Capitol building.

In 2023, Carr supported a resolution to expel Democratic lawmakers from the legislature for violating decorum rules. The expulsion was widely characterized as unprecedented.

== Electoral record ==
=== 2012 ===
2012 Republican primary election: Tennessee House of Representatives, District 12
Party	Candidate	Votes	%
Republican	Dale Carr	3,535	50.6%
Republican	Richard Montgomery	3,455	49.4%

Carr was unopposed in the general election in 2012.

=== 2014 ===
In 2014, Carr was unopposed in both the Republican primaries and the general elections.

=== 2016 ===
In 2016, Carr was again unopposed in both the Republican primaries and the general elections.

=== 2018 ===
In 2018, Carr was unopposed in the Republican primary.

2018 general election: Tennessee House of Representatives, District 12
Party	Candidate	Votes	%
Republican	Dale Carr	16,649	79.9%
Democratic	Robert Williams	4,195	20.1%
