= Trousdale County, Tennessee =

County in Tennessee, United States

Hartsville-Trousdale County
- County
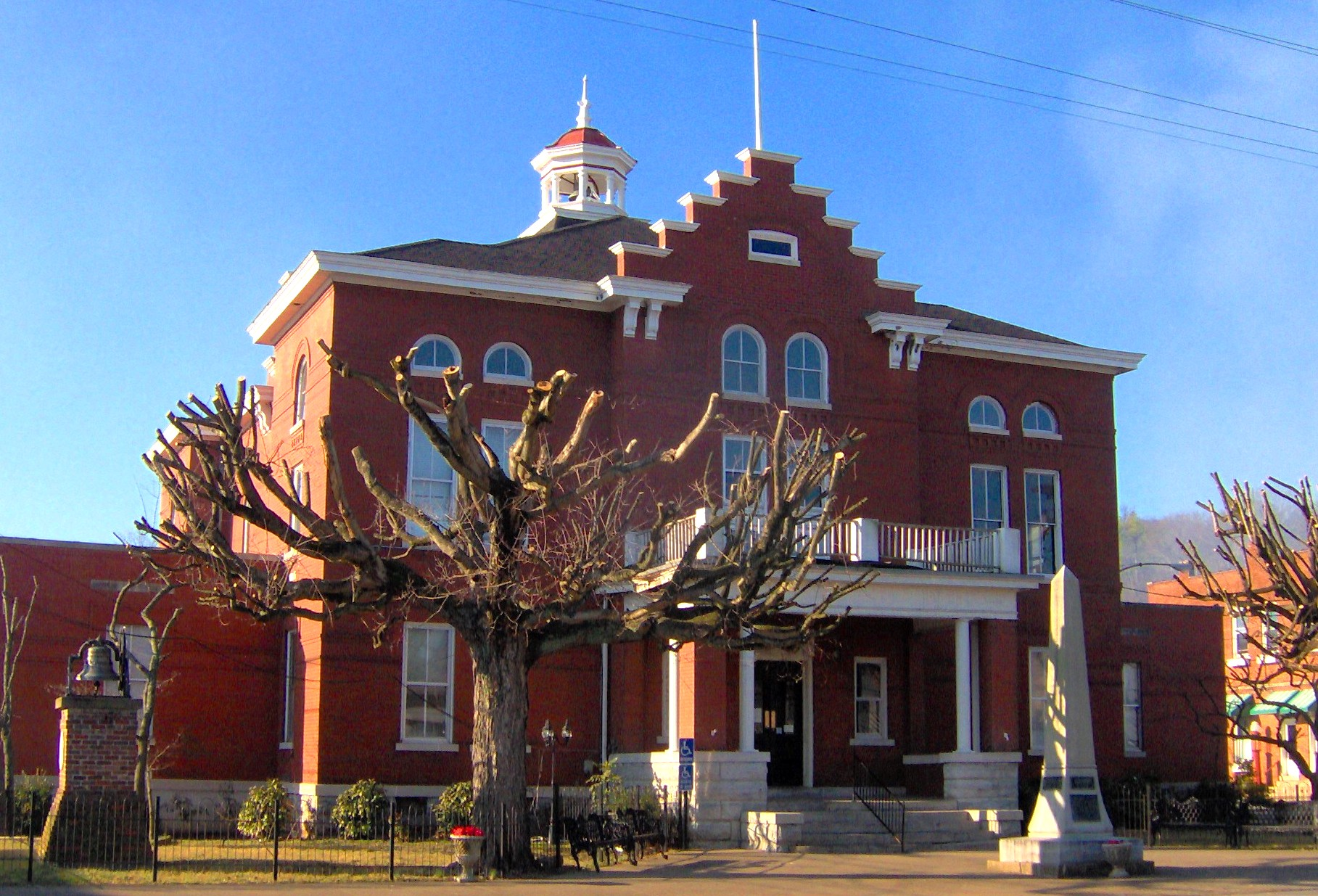
- Trousdale County Courthouse in Hartsville

- Location within the U.S. state of Tennessee
- Coordinates: 36°23′N 86°10′W
- Country: United States
- State: Tennessee
- Founded: September 5, 1870
- Named for: William Trousdale
- Seat: Hartsville
- Largest town: Hartsville

Area
  - Total: 117 sq mi (300 km^{2})
  - Land: 114 sq mi (300 km^{2})
  - Water: 2.5 sq mi (6.5 km^{2}) 2.1%

Population (2020)
  - Total: 11,615
  - Estimate (2025): 12,623 ▲
  - Density: 69/sq mi (27/km^{2})
- Time zone: UTC−6 (Central)
  - Summer (DST): UTC−5 (CDT)
- Congressional district: 6th
- Website: www.trousdalecountytn.gov

Trousdale County, also known as Hartsville/Trousdale County, is a county in the US state of Tennessee. As of the 2020 census, the population was 11,615. Its county seat is Hartsville, with which it shares a consolidated city-county government. With an area of just 117 square miles (300 km^{2}), it is Tennessee's smallest county in terms of geographic size.

Trousdale County is part of the Nashville-Davidson–Murfreesboro–Franklin, TN Metropolitan Statistical Area, although it is located just beyond the ring of "bedroom communities" in the Nashville metropolitan area. Farms and livestock ranches take up most of the land in this largely rural area.

Hartsville is the county seat of Trousdale County and now coextensive with it as a metropolitan government by virtue of a referendum which passed in Trousdale County by a single vote. Trousdale County High School is located here, as well as a technical school operated by the Tennessee Board of Regents. Trousdale County is one of two counties in Tennessee to have legalized parimutuel betting on horse racing, but no group has ever stepped forward to build a racetrack.

In 2016, Corrections Corporation of America (since renamed CoreCivic) opened the Trousdale Turner Correctional Center in Hartsville. Its approximately 2,500 prisoners constitute over a fifth of the county's residents and nearly 12% of Tennessee state prisoners. The prison became a hot spot for COVID-19 cases during the COVID-19 pandemic, giving the county the highest incidence rate in the U.S. in May 2020, with 1 in 7 residents known to be infected with coronavirus.

== History ==
Trousdale County was formed in 1870 from parts of Macon, Smith, Sumner and Wilson counties. It was named for William Trousdale (1790–1872), Brigadier General in the Mexican War, Governor of Tennessee, 1849–1851, and U.S. Minister to Brazil, 1853–1857. Hartsvillians had initially sought the creation of their own, separate county in 1849, but the effort failed.

On December 7, 1862, The Battle of Hartsville occurred within the boundaries of the county (although Trousdale County was not officially a county until 1870), with the Confederate forces under John Hunt Morgan defeating the Union forces of Absalom B. Moore in a surprise attack on their campsite. Morgan captured most of the Union forces and marched them South to Lebanon, Tennessee.

In the early part of the 20th century, a series of floods left the county seat devastated, with some floodwaters reaching flood stage of nine to twelve feet. There are photographs showing residents of the county canoeing in front of the flooded courthouse. During the Second World War, American infantry often trained in Trousdale County, simulating battles and participating in minor war games on the countryside owned by local farmers. After the war, the county flourished with the railroad running through the county. However, after the trains stopped running through the county, business slowed and suffered economically.

In 2020, an outbreak of COVID-19 at the Trousdale Turner Correctional Center, a privately operated prison, made Trousdale County the county with the highest per capita infection rate in the United States as of May 5, 2020. As of May 8, 1,284 prisoners at Trousdale had tested positive for the coronavirus, as had 50 employees and contractors at the facility.

== Geography ==
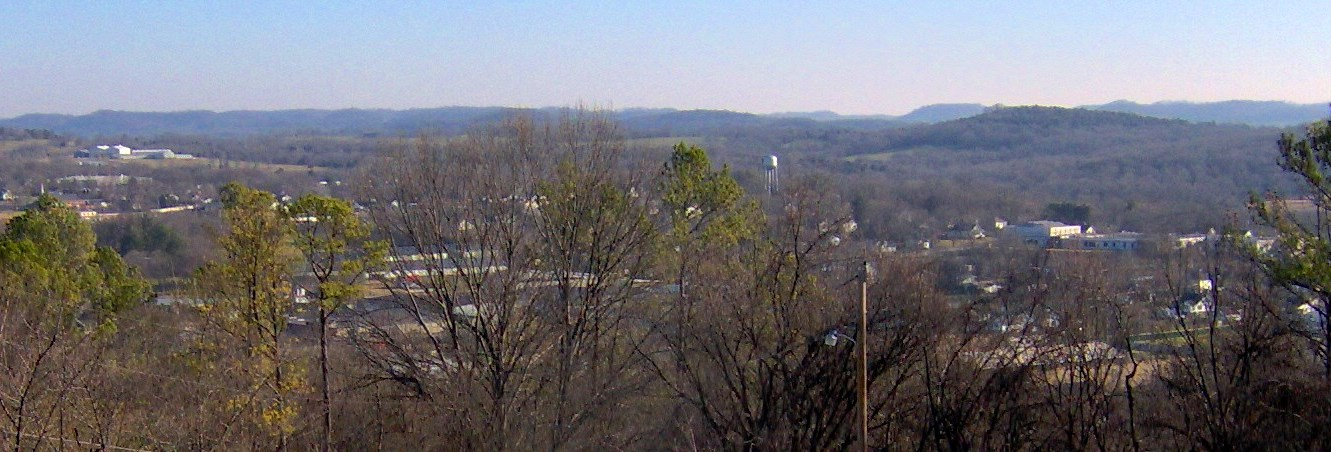
Hartsville area

According to the U.S. Census Bureau, the county has a total area of 117 square miles (300 km^{2}), of which 114 square miles (300 km^{2}) is land and 2.5 square miles (6.5 km^{2}) (2.1%) is water. It is the smallest county by area in Tennessee.

=== Adjacent counties ===
- Macon County (north)
- Smith County (east)
- Wilson County (south)
- Sumner County (west)

=== State protected areas ===
- Old Hickory Wildlife Management Area (part)

=== Highways ===
- US 231
- SR 10
- SR 25
- SR 141
- SR 260

== Demographics ==
Historical population
Census	Pop.	Note	%±
1880	6,646		—
1890	5,850		−12.0%
1900	6,004		2.6%
1910	5,874		−2.2%
1920	5,996		2.1%
1930	5,629		−6.1%
1940	6,113		8.6%
1950	5,520		−9.7%
1960	4,914		−11.0%
1970	5,155		4.9%
1980	6,137		19.0%
1990	5,920		−3.5%
2000	7,259		22.6%
2010	7,870		8.4%
2020	11,615		47.6%
2025 (est.)	12,623	▲	8.7%
U.S. Decennial Census; 1790–1960 1900–1990; 1990–2000 2010–2014

=== Racial and ethnic composition ===
Trousdale County, Tennessee – Racial and ethnic composition Note: the US Census treats Hispanic/Latino as an ethnic category. This table excludes Latinos from the racial categories and assigns them to a separate category. Hispanics/Latinos may be of any race.
Race / Ethnicity (NH = Non-Hispanic)	Pop 1980	Pop 1990	Pop 2000	Pop 2010	Pop 2020	% 1980	% 1990	% 2000	% 2010	% 2020
White alone (NH)	5,162	5,016	6,249	6,761	8,786	84.11%	84.73%	86.09%	85.91%	75.64%
Black or African American alone (NH)	876	851	824	748	1,917	14.27%	14.38%	11.35%	9.50%	16.50%
Native American or Alaska Native alone (NH)	7	14	17	23	26	0.11%	0.24%	0.23%	0.29%	0.22%
Asian alone (NH)	0	6	8	18	27	0.00%	0.10%	0.11%	0.23%	0.23%
Native Hawaiian or Pacific Islander alone (NH)	x	x	1	1	0	x	x	0.01%	0.01%	0.00%
Other race alone (NH)	1	2	2	3	20	0.02%	0.03%	0.03%	0.04%	0.17%
Mixed race or Multiracial (NH)	x	x	48	118	464	x	x	0.66%	1.50%	3.99%
Hispanic or Latino (any race)	91	31	110	198	375	1.48%	0.52%	1.52%	2.52%	3.23%
Total	6,137	5,920	7,259	7,870	11,615	100.00%	100.00%	100.00%	100.00%	100.00%

=== 2020 census ===
As of the 2020 census, there were 11,615 people, 3,469 households, and 2,083 families residing in the county.

The median age was 39.1 years. 18.9% of residents were under the age of 18 and 13.6% of residents were 65 years of age or older. For every 100 females there were 152.0 males, and for every 100 females age 18 and over there were 165.8 males age 18 and over.

The racial makeup of the county was 76.5% White, 16.5% Black or African American, 0.3% American Indian and Alaska Native, 0.2% Asian, less than 0.1% Native Hawaiian and Pacific Islander, 1.8% from some other race, and 4.7% from two or more races. Hispanic or Latino residents of any race make up 3.2% of the population.

Less than 0.1% of residents lived in urban areas, while 100.0% lived in rural areas.

There were 3,469 households in the county, of which 34.9% had children under the age of 18 living in them. Of all households, 50.0% were married-couple households, 18.4% were households with a male householder and no spouse or partner present, and 24.8% were households with a female householder and no spouse or partner present. About 25.1% of all households were made up of individuals and 11.2% had someone living alone who was 65 years of age or older.

There were 3,749 housing units, of which 7.5% were vacant. Among occupied housing units, 74.2% were owner-occupied and 25.8% were renter-occupied. The homeowner vacancy rate was 1.3% and the rental vacancy rate was 6.4%.

=== 2000 census ===
As of the census of 2000, there were 7,259 people, 2,780 households, and 2,034 families residing in the county. The population density was 64 people per square mile (25 people/km^{2}). There were 3,095 housing units at an average density of 27 units per square mile (10/km^{2}). The racial makeup of the county was 86.57% White, 11.35% Black or African American, 0.23% Native American, 0.11% Asian, 0.03% Pacific Islander, 0.99% from other races, and 0.72% from two or more races. 1.52% of the population were Hispanic or Latino of any race.

There were 2,780 households, out of which 31.90% had children under the age of 18 living with them, 58.30% were married couples living together, 11.30% had a female householder with no husband present, and 26.80% were non-families. 23.00% of all households were made up of individuals, and 10.30% had someone living alone who was 65 years of age or older. The average household size was 2.55 and the average family size was 2.99.

In the county, the population was spread out, with 24.20% under the age of 18, 8.50% from 18 to 24, 28.10% from 25 to 44, 24.90% from 45 to 64, and 14.30% who were 65 years of age or older. The median age was 38 years. For every 100 females, there were 96.90 males. For every 100 females age 18 and over, there were 92.40 males.

The median income for a household in the county was $32,212, and the median income for a family was $37,401. Males had a median income of $27,466 versus $21,207 for females. The per capita income for the county was $15,838. About 9.70% of families and 13.40% of the population were below the poverty line, including 14.00% of those under age 18 and 20.00% of those age 65 or over.

== Government and Politics ==
Like most other Middle Tennessee counties, Trousdale was formerly a Democratic stronghold that in the 21st century has transformed along with other rural counties in this region into becoming safely Republican. The only Republican presidential candidate to win the county before John McCain in 2008 was Richard Nixon in his 1972 landslide re-election. Since McCain's victory, the Republican margin of victory has dramatically increased with each presidential election.

United States presidential election results for Trousdale County, Tennessee
Year	Republican		Democratic		Third party(ies)	
Year	No.	%	No.	%	No.	%
1912	211	26.71%	544	68.86%	35	4.43%
1916	217	23.98%	688	76.02%	0	0.00%
1920	574	37.52%	955	62.42%	1	0.07%
1924	143	17.21%	684	82.31%	4	0.48%
1928	179	22.74%	607	77.13%	1	0.13%
1932	64	7.11%	835	92.78%	1	0.11%
1936	72	8.58%	765	91.18%	2	0.24%
1940	94	9.17%	929	90.63%	2	0.20%
1944	131	10.05%	1,170	89.72%	3	0.23%
1948	104	8.46%	1,014	82.51%	111	9.03%
1952	261	17.43%	1,236	82.57%	0	0.00%
1956	209	16.76%	1,032	82.76%	6	0.48%
1960	308	22.71%	1,036	76.40%	12	0.88%
1964	205	13.90%	1,270	86.10%	0	0.00%
1968	252	15.80%	694	43.51%	649	40.69%
1972	663	53.90%	539	43.82%	28	2.28%
1976	332	19.24%	1,385	80.24%	9	0.52%
1980	629	26.72%	1,674	71.11%	51	2.17%
1984	781	40.36%	1,142	59.02%	12	0.62%
1988	969	44.59%	1,193	54.90%	11	0.51%
1992	565	21.21%	1,846	69.29%	253	9.50%
1996	683	27.33%	1,615	64.63%	201	8.04%
2000	950	32.26%	1,966	66.76%	29	0.98%
2004	1,314	41.18%	1,851	58.01%	26	0.81%
2008	1,688	52.11%	1,475	45.54%	76	2.35%
2012	1,612	55.49%	1,240	42.69%	53	1.82%
2016	2,103	66.55%	946	29.94%	111	3.51%
2020	2,936	73.44%	1,012	25.31%	50	1.25%
2024	3,359	79.02%	856	20.14%	36	0.85%

The consolidated city-county government is headed by a 21-member commission, with two commissioners from each of ten districts plus a mayor elected at-large.

The county is within Tennessee's 6th congressional district in the United States House of Representatives, within the 35th District in the Tennessee House of Representatives, and within the 18th District in the Tennessee Senate.

== Communities ==
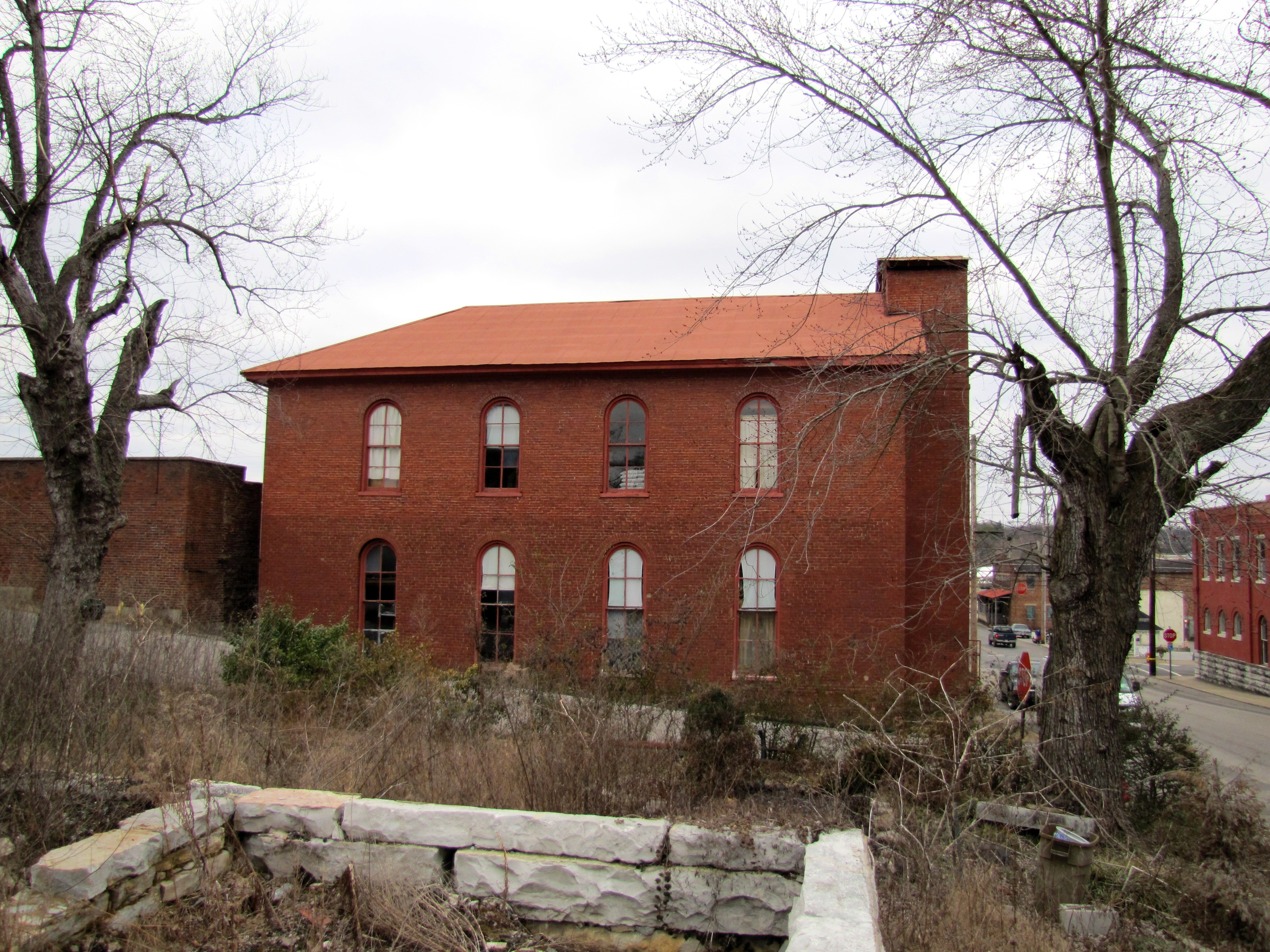
The old Methodist Church building in Hartsville

Hartsville, the county seat, is the only officially constituted municipality in Trousdale County. Former Unincorporated communities include:

- Beech Grove
- Shady Grove

== See also ==
- National Register of Historic Places listings in Trousdale County, Tennessee
