= Asa Hutchinson 2024 presidential campaign =

American political campaign

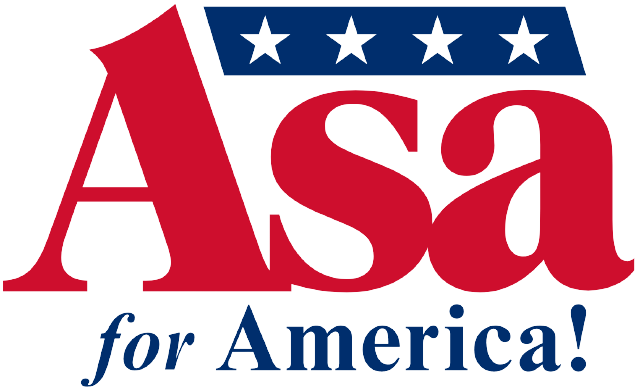
- Campaign: 2024 Republican primaries; 2024 U.S. presidential election
- Candidate: Asa Hutchinson; 46th Governor of Arkansas (2015–2023)
- Affiliation: Republican Party
- Status: Announced: April 26, 2023; Suspended: January 16, 2024
- Slogan: For America's Best

Website
- www.asa2024.com (archived - January 15, 2024)

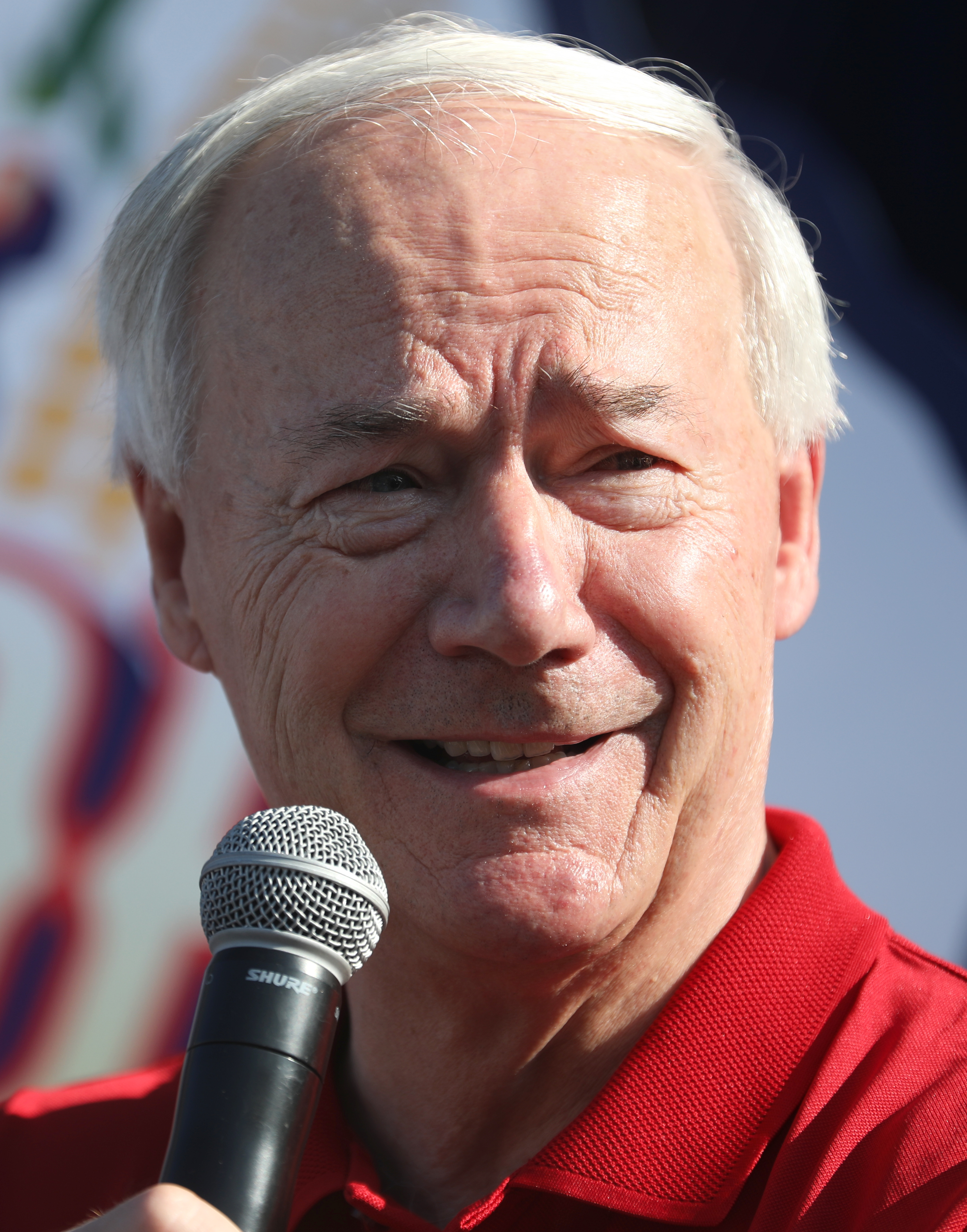
Asa Hutchinson 46th governor of Arkansas Announced campaign on April 26, 2023

The 2024 presidential campaign of Asa Hutchinson, the 46th governor of Arkansas, was informally announced on April 2, 2023, during an exclusive interview with ABC News's Jonathan Karl. The campaign was formally launched on April 26. Hutchinson announced the suspension of his campaign on January 16, 2024, the day after the Iowa Republican caucus.

In March 2023, Hutchinson stated that "more voices right now in opposition or providing an alternative to Donald Trump is the best thing in the right direction". While serving as governor of Arkansas, Hutchinson had demanded that Republicans who tried to overturn the 2020 presidential election and spread Trump's "Big Lie" about the election not be put in positions of leadership. He also accused Trump of dividing the party, referring to his election conspiracies as "recipe[s] for disaster". On February 5, 2022, Hutchinson and U.S. senator Lisa Murkowski condemned the Republican National Committee's censure of Representatives Adam Kinzinger and Liz Cheney for their support of and participation on the House Select Committee tasked with investigating the January 6 United States Capitol attack.

== Campaign ==
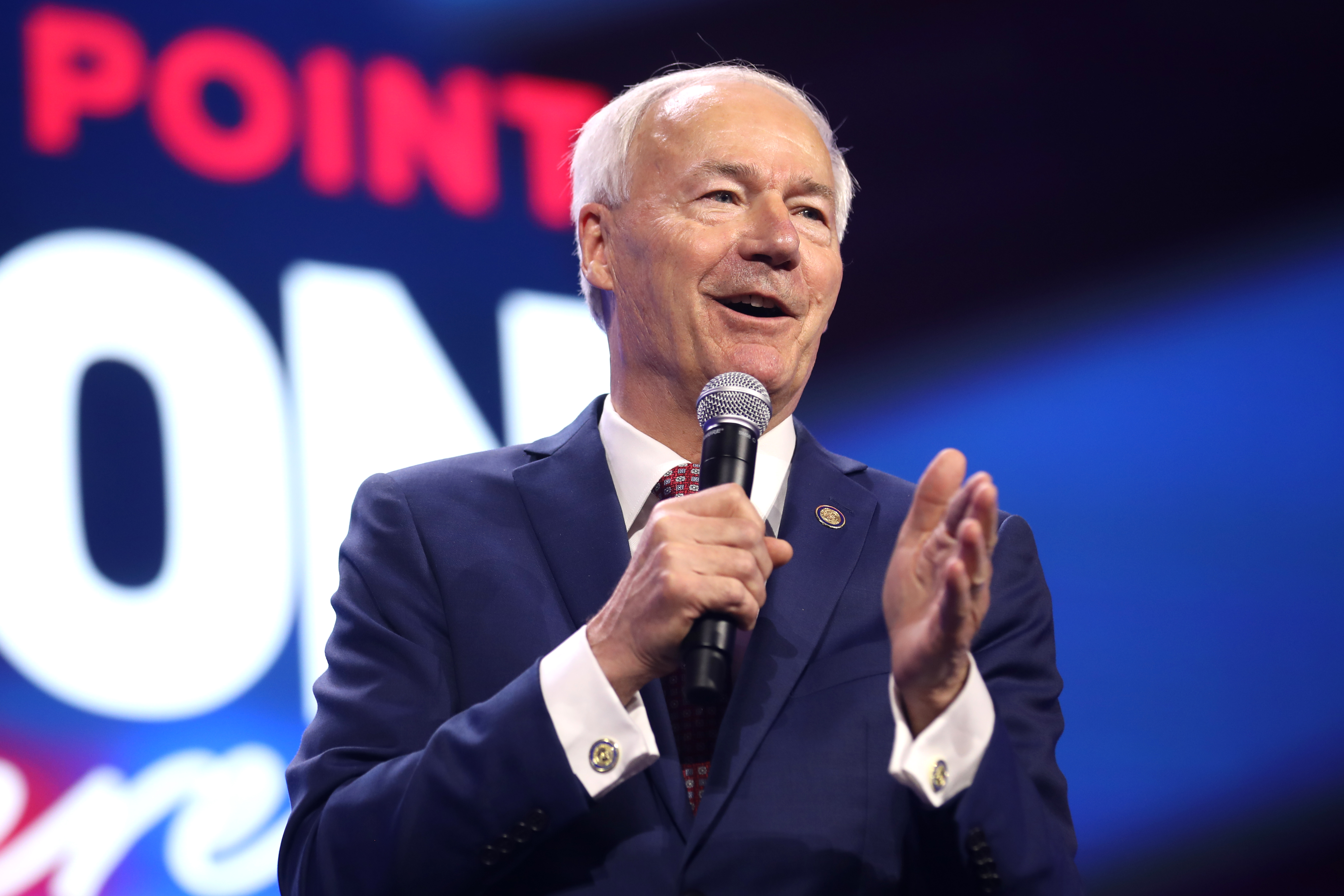
Hutchinson at the 2023 Turning Point Action Conference in West Palm Beach, Florida

=== Second debate ===
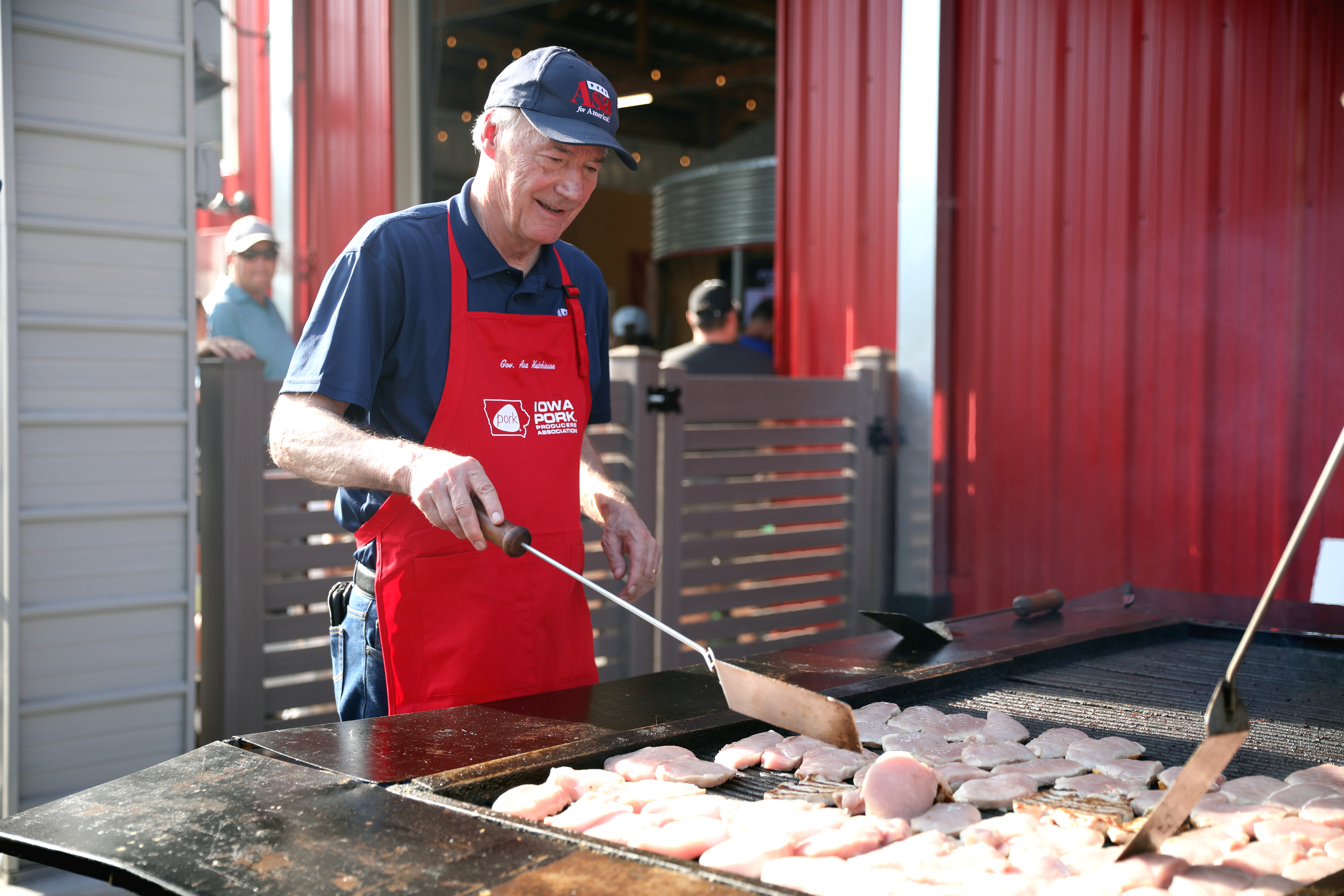
Hutchinson grilling pork at the 2023 Iowa State Fair

Hutchinson did not meet the criteria to participate in the second Republican debate, as he failed to achieve at least three percent support in three respected polls. Nevertheless, he announced that he plans to stay in the race and set a personal goal of polling at four percent consistently before Thanksgiving. He indicated that if he does not meet this self-imposed target, he would withdraw from the race.

In lieu of the second debate, Hutchinson had a press conference where he outlined some of his key points. Addressing his absence as "You got to think of it as a bye week in the NFL. You don't play every weekend. You know, necessarily participate in every debate." and went on to elaborate on how he plans on increasing U.S. manufacturing jobs and increasing energy independence.

His former campaign manager, Rob Burgess, left on October 31, 2023, and was replaced by Alison Williams.

=== Third debate ===
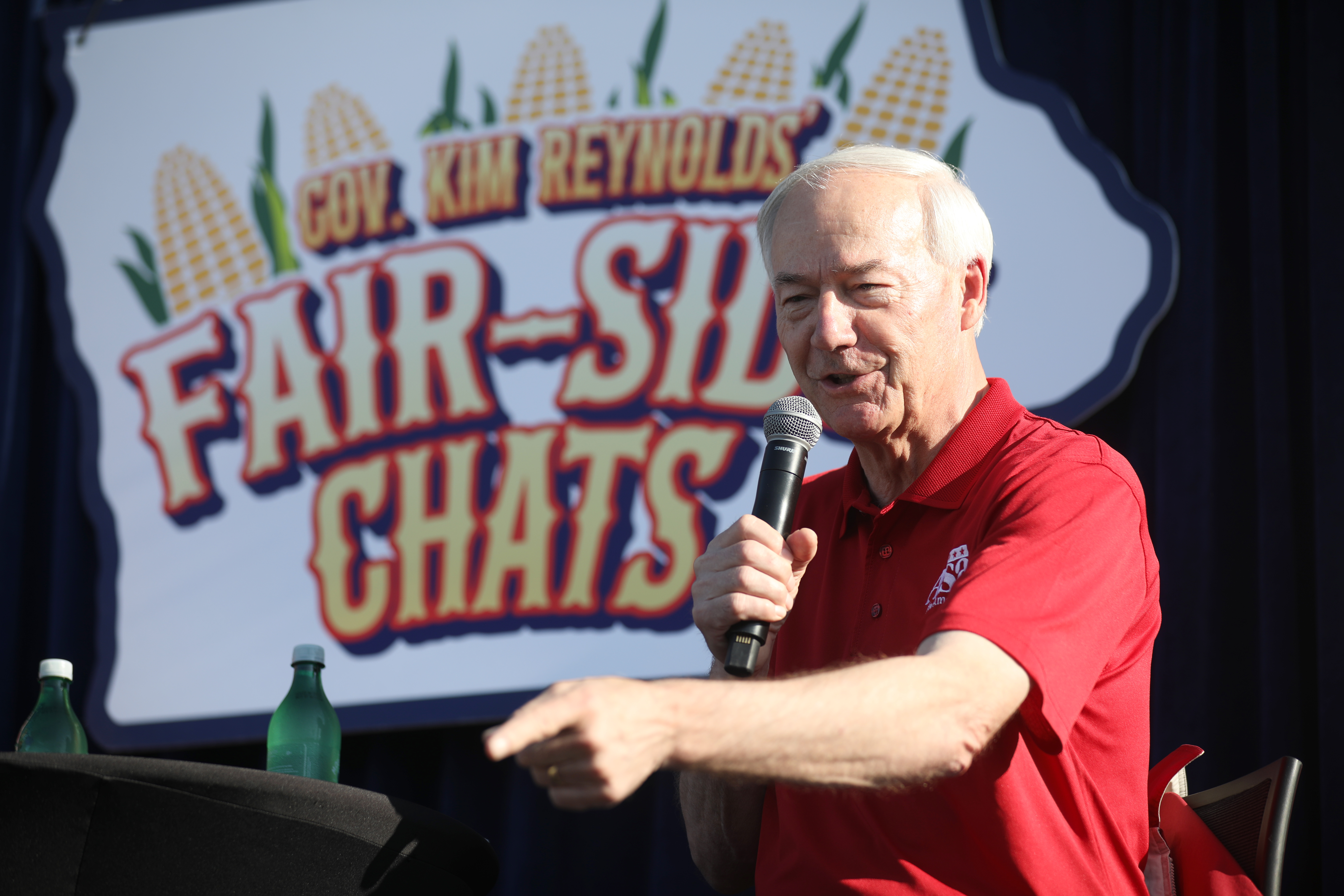
Hutchinson speaking at a campaign stop in Iowa

Hutchinson did not qualify for the third Republican debate, again falling short of the polling requirements, dropping to 0.6%. When asked in a November 2023 interview by Jim Acosta for CNN if he planned on dropping out of the race for the Republican party to coalesce around an anti-Trump candidate, Hutchinson backtracked on his earlier self-stated goal of dropping out by Thanksgiving if he wasn't polling at four percent, instead stating that he would only begin to consider dropping out after the South Carolina primary. New Hampshire Governor Chris Sununu urged both Hutchinson and North Dakota governor Doug Burgum to drop out of the race after failing to appear at the debates and having low polling.

Hutchinson has stated that he is remaining in the race until actual vote returns come in, stating that polls are often wildly inaccurate, despite them showing him hovering at about 0% at the time of the debate. Hutchinson also increased his attacks on Donald Trump in this period, comparing him to Joseph McCarthy, and comparing Trumpism to McCarthyism. In an October town hall event in Exeter, New Hampshire, Hutchinson denounced the Freedom Caucus calling them a small group of people who want only to generate "chaos." At the event he also denounced tariffs, a physical border wall and that he is running "to bring out the best of America." On December 4, just two days before the Fourth Debate, Hutchinson went on a local media tour with local cable news networks in Iowa.

=== Fourth debate ===
Hutchinson again did not qualify for the fourth Republican debate, yet again falling well short of the polling requirements, stating that he is remaining in the race so that Republican voters can have "plenty of choices."

On January 5, Hutchinson attended a campaign stop in Muscatine, Iowa as part of his "Return to Normal" tour just 10 days before the Iowa caucus, breaking with the other Republican candidates which have shifted away from in-person meet the candidate sessions, to digital ad and information campaigns. Hutchinson has also taken a personal likening to the "Return to Normal" brand, mostly due to his campaign being a return to the Bush-era of Republican politics.

On January 10, Hutchinson wrote an op-ed in The Des Moines Register titled "Renew hope and rebuild the American Dream" where he outlined the problems that America is currently facing, such as the opioid epidemic and open borders, and what he plans on doing to solve these problems as president. Hutchinson touts his experience in the Bush administration, as well as the $2 billion surplus in the Arkansas state budget as proof of his leadership capabilities, and states that America must embrace unity and a restoration of the American Dream.

During this period Hutchinson has also started to seriously suffer in name recognition. At one campaign event in a half-empty bar in Waukee, Iowa, one attendee who gave comment to The Washington Post had no idea who Hutchinson was, asking "Was he a state trooper?" Additionally, The Washington Post noted that most attendants at his rallies were the same group of political science students from Duke University on a project to learn more about the Iowa caucus. Hutchinson has also personally spent time canvassing with voters consistently asking who he plans to vote for to the point where Hutchinson joked he should change his campaign slogan to "I'm still running."

=== Iowa caucus ===
Hutchinson focused most of his energy campaigning in the state of Iowa, hoping to do well in the caucus there on January 15, 2024, and use it as a springboard for future campaign events. He ultimately finished sixth, with 191 votes.

Hutchinson got 22,044 votes or 0.1% during the whole 2024 Republican Party presidential primaries.

== Positions ==
=== Abortion ===
"I am a pro-life governor, from a conservative state that has a conservative record,"

— Asa Hutchinson at the first Republican Presidential debate

As governor of Arkansas, February 2019, Hutchinson signed a bill into law that would criminalize abortion in the event Roe v. Wade is overturned. On March 9, 2021, he signed SB6, a near-total abortion ban, into law. He said that the bill was intended "to set the stage for the Supreme Court overturning current case law. I would have preferred the legislation to include the exceptions for rape and incest, which has been my consistent view, and such exceptions would increase the chances for a review by the U.S. Supreme Court." On May 8, 2022, Hutchinson responded to comments by Senator Minority Leader Mitch McConnell about potential passage of a future federal law prohibiting abortions nationwide: "If the court reverses Roe v. Wade, they're saying that the Constitution does not provide that, which returns it to the states. And that's where the vigorous debate is going to be. That is where we're going to face a lot of concerns on the compassion side." On April 30, 2023, Hutchinson stated that if a federal abortion ban passed both chambers of Congress and reached his desk as president, that he would sign the ban into law.

=== Border security ===
Hutchinson denounced efforts by the Trump administration to build a southern border wall, and denounced calls for other border barriers. Instead he argues that the border patrol should be expanded and better funded. He also stated he supports a merit-based system and an increase to skilled and educated migrants, but would support the death penalty to fentanyl smugglers. Hutchinson stated he supports the "Stay in Mexico" policy of the Trump administration, but is opposed to family separation. Hutchinson proposed devolving federal power to give work visas to the states, and as governor of Arkansas signed legislation allowing immigrants with federal work permits to receive occupational and professional licenses in Arkansas. However, in 2021, Hutchinson was one of 26 governors that signed a letter sent to Joe Biden calling the situation on the southern border a "national crisis."

=== Climate change ===
Hutchinson has acknowledged that climate change is real, but stated that it isn't an existential threat. Hutchinson stated that if elected president he would withdraw the United States from the Paris Agreement and would support "market driven" solutions to energy demands, be they renewable or fossil fuels. Hutchinson also threatened to sue the federal government if it mandated emission reductions.

=== COVID-19 ===
In August 2021, Hutchinson signed bills into law that prohibited businesses and government facilities from requiring proof of COVID-19 vaccination for staff and customers to enter facilities. While Arkansas was experiencing a wave of COVID-19 cases, he also signed a bill into law that prohibited state and local officials from enacting mask mandates. He later said he regretted doing so. In December 2021, Hutchinson praised President Joe Biden's COVID policies and thanked Biden for his efforts to "get the vaccinations out" and "depoliticizing" the federal COVID response. In January 2022, however, Hutchinson encouraged large businesses to not comply with the Biden administration's vaccine requirements.

=== Crime ===
Hutchinson has called on States to increase their transparency requirements for police, and called for a consistent transparency policy across the country to rebuild trust between law enforcement and the American people. He has also called for reform for federal law enforcement to depoliticize agencies, namely by requiring their hiring interviews to be recorded and made public information. After the 2023 Nashville school shooting, Hutchinson called for armed officers in every school in the nation.

==== Fentanyl ====
Hutchinson supports the death penalty for Fentanyl smugglers and dealers. He also called for more federal action to fight smugglers and dealers. Hutchinson stated that due to his time as DEA head "I am prepared to provide real solutions for the fentanyl crisis our communities face" however, has yet to outline these solutions.

=== Donald Trump ===
Hutchinson has used most of his campaign resources to portray himself as an anti-Trump candidate more in line with the more moderate neoconservative views of the George W. Bush administration. Hutchinson demanded that Republicans who tried to overturn the 2020 presidential election and spread Trump's "Big Lie" about the election not be put in positions of leadership. He also accused Trump of dividing the party and said his election conspiracies were "recipe for disaster". On February 5, 2022, Hutchinson and U.S. senator Lisa Murkowski condemned the Republican National Committee's censure of representatives Adam Kinzinger and Liz Cheney for their support of and participation on the House Select Committee tasked with investigating the January 6 United States Capitol attack. Following the federal indictment of Donald Trump in June 2023, Hutchinson called on Trump to drop out of the presidential race. On November 4, 2023, Hutchinson attended the Republican Party of Florida's Freedom Summit where he stated that:

As someone who's been in the courtroom for over 25 years, as a federal prosecutor, and also in defending some of the most serious federal criminal cases, I can say that there is a significant likelihood that Donald Trump will be found guilty by a jury on a felony offense next year.

In response Hutchinson was subjected to intense booing for over a minute and attempted to speak over the audience. At a town-hall event in Exeter, New Hampshire on October 10, Hutchinson denounced Trump, comparing him to Joseph McCarthy, and Trumpism to McCarthyism, while also denouncing the Freedom Caucus and its members as rebel-rousers seeking to cause chaos with little to no actual plans or solutions. At the town hall he also denounced most of, if not all of, Trump's platforms during all three of his presidential campaigns and his time in office, namely denouncing tariffs and protectionist economies and a physical barrier at the southern border.

=== Economy ===
==== Energy ====
Hutchinson stated that if elected he would embrace an "all of the above" policy for United States' energy independence, reversing restrictions on pipelines and their construction, reducing barriers to nuclear power and ending what he described as a "war" on fossil fuels.

==== Entitlement ====
As governor, Hutchinson implemented work requirements for Medicaid enrollees. Hutchinson proposed at a town-hall event in Exeter, New Hampshire, to restore Ronald Reagan era policies for Social Security and Medicare, namely by creating a bipartisan commission that can make decisions about budgets and programs in a less political atmosphere.

==== Labor ====
Hutchinson plans to cut taxes and reduce regulations which he argues will boost the private sector and enhance wages for American workers, namely by implementing policies and training programs to grow the labor force, with a priority in manufacturing.

==== Rural development ====
Hutchinson was named the 2018 "Rural Advocate of the Year" by the Arkansas Economic Development Commission and the Arkansas Rural Development Commission. Hutchinson stated that his childhood rural upbringing "is a vital part of who I became and everything I do" and supported an extensive grant to the rural community of Arkansas, including efforts to better connect rural areas to the internet.

==== Welfare ====
Hutchinson suggested implementing work requirements for welfare in an effort to cut welfare spending and increase the labor force.

=== Foreign policy ===
At a town-hall event in Exeter, New Hampshire on October 10, Hutchinson has proposed repealing any and all tariffs introduced during the Trump administration, and has denounced a protectionist economy. Hutchinson also announced that he is steadfast in his loyalty to Israel and denounced Republicans supporting a non-interventionist stance to the 2023 Israeli invasion of the Gaza Strip. Hutchinson previously signed into law a bill that outlawed boycotting Israel in Arkansas.

Hutchinson also stated that if elected he would continue the United States' support to Ukraine in the Russo-Ukrainian war, stating that it would be a "mistake" to reduce funding and support.

Hutchinson argued in favor of increasing federal spending for the United States Navy as a deterrent to the People's Republic of China and its hostility to the Republic of China. He also argued for "decoupling" of key industries from the Chinese economy, namely the reshoring of manufacturing capabilities. He also called for increased Indo-Pacific cooperation. However, as governor, Hutchinson facilitated $1.4 billion in deals with Chinese businesses for expansion in Arkansas while also giving many Chinese companies tax breaks, with some of the companies having connections with his son, Asa Hutchinson III.

=== LGBT rights ===
In 2015, Hutchinson signed into law legislation that would prohibit localities from extending civil rights protections to LGBT individuals. At the time, Arkansas was among states that allowed discrimination in the workplace, housing and business on the basis of gender identity and sexual orientation. In March 2021, Hutchinson signed into law legislation that would allow doctors to refuse non-emergency medical treatment to LGBT people based on moral objection. In April 2021, he vetoed a bill that would make it illegal for transgender minors to receive gender-affirming medication or surgery, calling it "a vast government overreach". The state legislature later overrode his veto.

=== Second amendment ===
Hutchinson vetoed legislature as governor in 2021 which would have prohibited local police from enforcing federal gun laws, saying the measure would jeopardize law enforcement and the public.

== Suspension ==
After his poor performance in the Iowa caucus, Hutchinson suspended his campaign on January 16, 2024. Hutchinson said that his "message of being a principled Republican with experience and telling the truth" did not resonate with the voters in Iowa. He later endorsed Nikki Haley's campaign for the nomination.
