= Abram Wakeman =

American attorney, businessman and politician

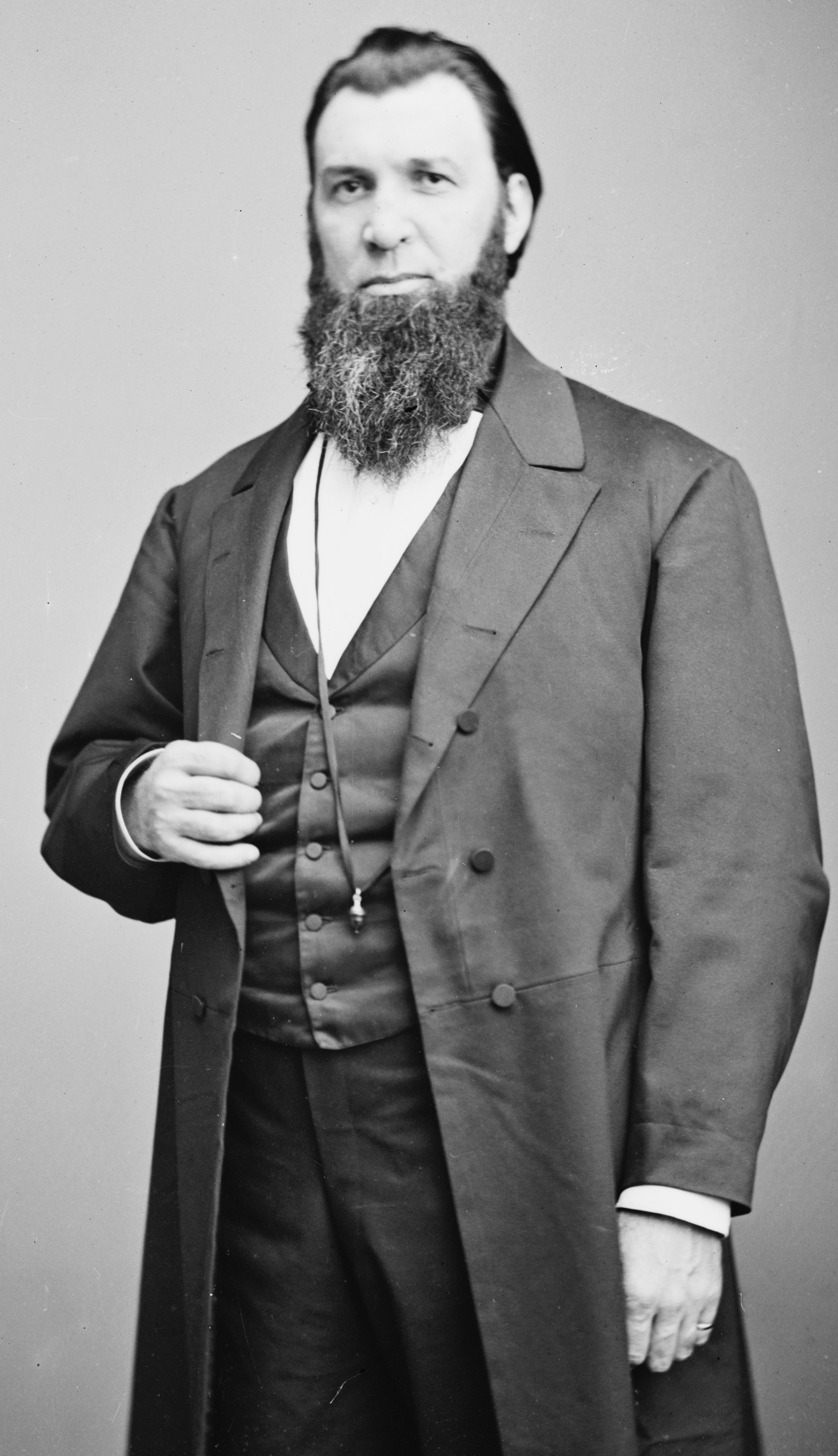
- Wakeman circa 1862. Brady-Handy Collection, Library of Congress.

Member of the U.S. House of Representatives from New York's 8th district
- In office March 4, 1855 – March 3, 1857
- Preceded by: Francis B. Cutting
- Succeeded by: Horace F. Clark

Surveyor of the Port of New York
- In office September 14, 1864 – March 29, 1869
- Preceded by: Rufus F. Andrews
- Succeeded by: Alonzo B. Cornell

Postmaster of New York City
- In office March 21, 1862 – September 18, 1864
- Preceded by: William B. Taylor
- Succeeded by: James Kelly

Member of the New York City Board of Aldermen from the 12th Ward
- In office 1854–1856
- Preceded by: Wesley Smith
- Succeeded by: David S. Jackson

Member of the New York State Assembly from the 4th District of New York County
- In office 1850–1852
- Preceded by: George J. Cornell
- Succeeded by: Theodore A. Ward

Personal details
- Born: May 31, 1824 Greenfield Hill, Connecticut
- Died: June 29, 1889 (aged 65) New York City, New York
- Resting place: Green-Wood Cemetery, Brooklyn, New York
- Party: Whig (before 1855); Republican (after 1855)
- Spouse(s): Mary E. Harwood (m. 1851–1883, her death); Katharine Horton Price (m. 1884–1889, his death)
- Children: 4
- Occupation: Attorney; Businessman

Military service
- Allegiance: United States Union
- Branch/service: Union Army
- Years of service: 1861
- Rank: Colonel
- Commands: 81st Pennsylvania Infantry Regiment
- Battles/wars: American Civil War

Abram Wakeman (May 31, 1824 – June 29, 1889) was an attorney, businessman, and politician from New York City. An important figure in the creation of the Republican Party in the mid-1850s, and a supporter of the Union during the American Civil War, he was most notable for his service as a U.S. Representative from New York.

A native of Greenfield Hill, Connecticut, Wakeman completed a college preparatory education, taught school while studying law, and attained admission to the bar in 1847. He practiced in New York City, and also became involved in several businesses, including banks, railroads, and insurance companies.

A political colleague of William H. Seward and Thurlow Weed, Wakeman became active in politics as a Whig and served in the New York State Assembly (1850–1852) and as a city Alderman (1854–1856). In 1854, Wakeman was elected to Congress, and he served one term, 1855 to 1857. He helped found the Republican Party in 1855, and was a delegate to the 1856 Republican National Convention. During the American Civil War, Wakeman was a strong supporter of the Union, and provided important organizational and financial aid. His support for the Abraham Lincoln administration resulted in lucrative political appointments as Postmaster of New York City (1862–1864), and Surveyor of the Port of New York (1864–1869).

In his later years, Wakeman was one of the developers of Coney Island as a resort and amusement destination, and realized a substantial profit when he sold out to a syndicate of investors. He died in New York City, and was buried at Green-Wood Cemetery in Brooklyn.

== Early life ==
Wakeman was born in Greenfield Hill, Connecticut on May 31, 1824, the son of Jonathan and Clara Wakeman. Wakeman undertook college preparatory studies at Fairfield Academy in Connecticut and graduated from Herkimer Academy in Little Falls, New York. He taught school while studying law with the firm of Capron & Lake in Little Falls. After completing his studies with New York City attorney Horace Holden, Wakeman was admitted to the bar in 1847.

== Start of career ==
After becoming an attorney, Wakeman commenced practice as Horace Holden's junior partner. He later practiced as the senior partner of Wakeman, Latting & Phelps, the junior member of which was Edward John Phelps. Wakeman was also active in several business ventures, and was a director or executive of several banks, railroads, and insurance companies. He was one of the original incorporators of the Irving Savings Institution and an incorporator and director of the Hamilton Fire Insurance Company. He was also a director of the New York and Hempstead Plains Railroad, and later the New York, Bay Ridge and Jamaica Railroad.

== Political career ==
In the early 1840s, Wakeman became active in politics as a Whig, and he became a colleague of Thurlow Weed, William H. Seward, and Henry Jarvis Raymond, the leaders of the party in New York state. He was a member of the New York State Assembly (New York Co., 4th D.) in 1850 and 1851. From 1854 to 1856, he was a member of the city's Board of Aldermen. Wakeman was elected as a Whig to the 34th Congress (March 4, 1855 – March 3, 1857). With the collapse of the Whig Party in the mid 1850s, Wakeman was one of the organizers of the new Republican Party. He was an unsuccessful Republican candidate for reelection in 1856 to the 35th Congress and served as delegate to the 1856 Republican National Convention.

== American Civil War ==
At the outbreak of the American Civil War, Wakeman raised the 81st Pennsylvania Infantry Regiment and briefly became its commander with the rank of colonel, an honor often accorded to the individual responsible for raising and equipping a unit. As was the usual custom, Wakeman resigned before the unit left for the front lines, and was succeeded by James Miller, a veteran of the Mexican–American War.

As a strong supporter of the Union, the administration of Abraham Lincoln, and the Republican Party, Wakeman had a claim to party patronage, which was recognized when he was appointed Postmaster of New York City, a lucrative post he held from March 21, 1862, to September 18, 1864. In 1863, Wakeman presided over the New York State convention of the National Union Party, the wartime combination of Republicans and pro-Union Democrats, and he was a delegate to the party's 1864 national convention. When New York City opponents of the Lincoln administration and military conscription rioted in 1863, Wakeman was singled out because he was a prominent federal official; a mob broke into his Yorkville home to steal all the clothing and furniture, then burned the house to the ground.

During the 1864 United States presidential election, some prominent northern newspaper publishers and Democrats advocated for a negotiated peace with the Confederacy. Though he doubted their efforts would bear fruit, Lincoln authorized Horace Greeley to meet with Confederate commissioners in Niagara Falls, Ontario. Greeley's effort ended in failure when the Confederate representatives admitted they had no authority to bargain for terms. Afterwards Lincoln worked to persuade pro-peace Democrats in the north to support his re-election, including asking Wakeman to intercede with James Gordon Bennett Sr. of the New York Herald. Wakeman was partly successful; though the Herald habitually endorsed Democratic candidates, and Bennett had advocated for both the candidacy of Democratic nominee George B. McClellan and a negotiated peace with the Confederacy, for the general election the Herald made no endorsement for president. Wakeman also provided Lincoln other intelligence about politics in New York, including the news that Weed was considering backing another candidate for the Republican nomination and the news that he ultimately decided to give Lincoln his tacit support.

Wakeman was also friendly with Mary Todd Lincoln; in addition to seeing her at dinner parties and other events, he exchanged frequent letters with her. When Mary Lincoln's compulsive shopping caused her to incur a large debt to New York City retailers, Wakeman aided her to refinance her obligations so her husband wouldn't find out. In 1864, Wakeman was appointed Surveyor of the Port of New York, a lucrative position and an important political plum, and he served until 1869. (Note: Customs houses were managed by the Collector, Surveyor and Naval Officer, who were responsible for assessing tariffs on cargoes, collecting them, and submitting them to the Treasury Department. These individuals received salaries, but received much more from the "moiety" system, which awarded them a percentage of the cargoes seized and fines levied on importers who attempted to evade the tariff. Customs houses were important for political parties, because incumbent managers controlled hundreds of jobs that could be doled out to the party faithful. Employees were also a source of campaign contributions, since they were expected to give a portion of their salary back to the party. While Wakeman's salary as surveyor was about $5,000, he typically earned more than $50,000 annually because of the moiety system. At the time, the president's salary was $25,000. $50,000 is equal to $1.21 million today.)

When Mary Lincoln attempted to pay her debts in 1867 by holding an auction of her personal items in an event that came to be known as the "Old Clothes Scandal", she attempted to enlist Wakeman's aid. In a letter which later became public, she named Wakeman and Simeon Draper, the former Collector of the Port of New York, as being obligated to help her financially (though Draper had died the year before), since she had aided them in procuring their federal positions. After a visit from Wakeman, Mrs. Lincoln tempered her public comments, but the auction still went forward. It was unsuccessful, but in 1871 Congress granted her a life pension of $3,000 a year (about $64,000 in 2019).

== Later career ==
In his later years, Wakeman was one of the principal developers of Coney Island as a resort and amusement park area. He made a substantial profit in the late 1870s when he sold his interests in Coney Island to a syndicate led by businessman Austin Corbin.

== Death and burial ==
Wakeman died in New York City on June 29, 1889. He was interred at Green-Wood Cemetery in Brooklyn.

== Family ==
In 1851, Wakeman married Mary E. Harwood (1825–1883) of Ridgeway, New York. She was the daughter of Cyrus Harwood and Mary (Lee) Harwood, and a niece of William Little Lee. His second wife was Katharine Horton Price, whom he married in 1884.

With his first wife, Wakeman's children included Harwood, Abram, Mary C., and Rosamond. With his second wife, he was the stepfather of Kate Billings Noel.

Dr. Harwood Wakeman died in August 1879 when he drowned while swimming in Blue Mountain Lake, New York.

In March 1883, Mary E. and Rosamund Wakeman were killed in a house fire. According to new accounts, Rosamund Wakeman helped her mother's nurse escape the building that caught fire. Mary Wakeman was an invalid, and when she had difficulty attempting to exit, Rosamund Wakeman went to her aid. Both mother and daughter were overcome by smoke before they could escape.

== Sources ==
=== Books ===
- Hay, John (2000). Burlingame, Michael (ed.). At Lincoln's Side: John Hay's Civil War Correspondence and Selected Writings. Carbondale, IL: Southern Illinois University Press. ISBN 978-0-8093-2711-9.
- Murphy, D. H. (1864). Presidential Election, 1864: Proceedings of the National Union Convention. New York, NY: Baker & Godwin.
- Seyfried, Vincent F. (1966). The Long Island Rail Road: A Comprehensive History, Part 4 (PDF). Uniondale, NY: Salisbury Printers.
- Stone, William Leete; Wait, A. Dallas (1901). Washington County, New York: Its History to the Close of the Nineteenth Century. New York, NY: New York History Co.
- Underhill & Munson, Stenographers (1863). Official Report of the Proceedings of the Union State Convention, Held at Syracuse, September 2d, 1863. Albany, NY: Weed, Parsons and Company.
- Wakeman, Robert Peel (1900). Wakeman Genealogy, 1630–1899. Meridan, CT: Journal Publishing Co.
- Ward, George K. (1910). Andrew Warde and his Descendants, 1597–1910. New York, NY: A.T. De La Mare Printing and Publishing.

=== Newspapers ===
- "The Presidential Election: Letter from Thurlow Weed in Favor of Lincoln and Johnson". The New York Times. New York, NY. 17 October 1864.
- "Mrs. Lincoln's Wardrobe". Brooklyn Daily Eagle. Brooklyn, NY. 12 October 1867 – via Newspapers.com.
- "More of Mrs. Lincoln and Her Wardrobe". The San Francisco Examiner. San Francisco, CA. 26 October 1867 – via Newspapers.com.
- "Funeral of Abram Wakeman". The New York Times. New York, NY. 2 July 1889.
- Sherwood, Deborah Jones (28 April 1996). "The First First Lady Auction". The Washington Post. Washington, DC.

=== Internet ===
- "Horace Greeley (1811–1872)". Mr. Lincoln and New York. New York, NY: Gilder Lehrman Institute of American History.
- "Lincoln's Landslide Victory in the Election of 1864". HistoryOnTheNet. Washington, DC: Regnery Publishing. 27 December 2018.
- "Abram Wakeman (1824–1889)". Mr. Lincoln and New York. New York, NY: Gilder Lehrman Institute of American History.
- "First Lady Biography: Mary Lincoln". FirstLadies.org. Canton, OH: National First Ladies Library. Archived from the original on 9 May 2012.

New York State Assembly
Preceded by George J. Cornell	New York State Assembly; New York County, 4th District; 1850–1852	Succeeded by Theodore A. Ward
U.S. House of Representatives
Preceded by Francis B. Cutting	Member of the U.S. House of Representatives from New York's 8th congressional district 1855–1857	Succeeded by Horace F. Clark
