= 1864 Radical Democratic National Convention =

- 1864 presidential election
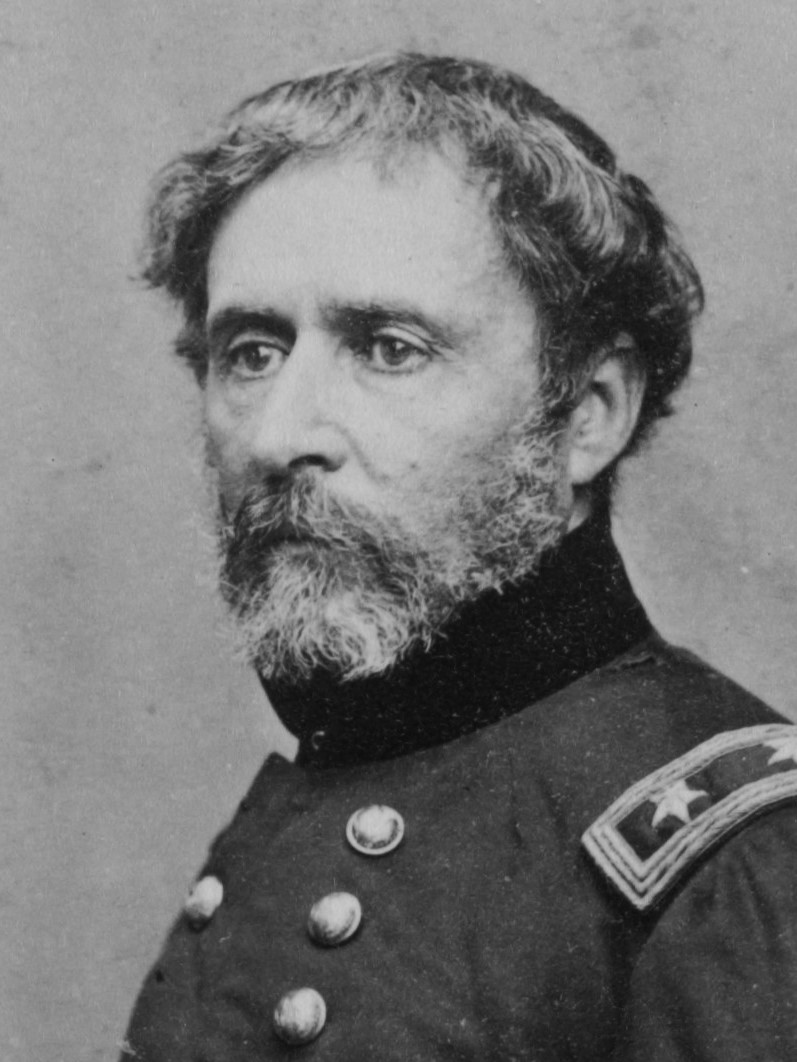
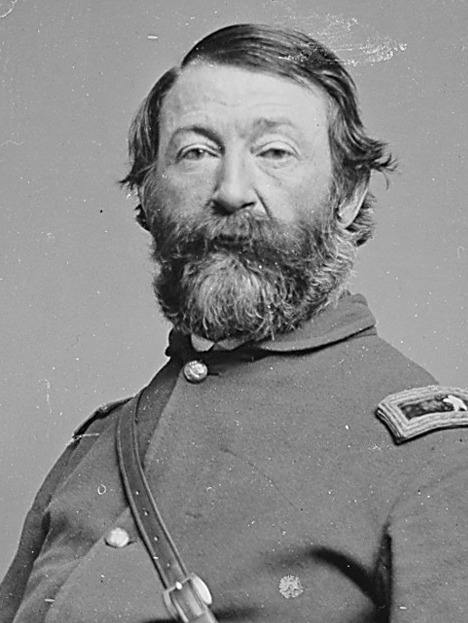
- Nominees (Frémont and Cochrane)

Convention
- Dates: May 30–June 1, 1864
- City: Cleveland, Ohio
- Venue: Elmer's Hall & Chapin's Hall
- Chair: John Cochrane of New York

Candidates
- Presidential nominee: John C. Frémont of California
- Vice-presidential nominee: John Cochrane of New York

Voting
- Total delegates: 350 (Note: sources disagree on the number of delegates, but several report 350)
- Results (president): acclamation
- Results (vice president): acclamation

1864 Radical Democratic National Convention was held May 30–June 1, 1864, in Cleveland. It saw the Radical Democratic Party nominate John C. Frémont for president and John Cochrane for vice president in the 1864 United States presidential election. Its ticket ultimately dropped-out of the race three months later, backing Abraham Lincoln for re-election.

== Logistics ==
The convention was a presidential nominating convention organized by what became known as the "Radical Democratic Party", a Radical Republicans-aligned splinter party from the Republican Party. It convened in Cleveland, Ohio.

Delegates began arriving on May 29, 1864. The New York Times reported that the hall which the convention organizers had planned to use had been double-booked by an opera troupe. Almost all delegates were instructed to support John C. Frémont, with a major exception being the New York delegation, which was composed largely of War Democrats who supported nominating Ulysses S. Grant. Various estimates of the number of delegates were reported in the press; The New York Times reported 156 delegates, but the number generally reported elsewhere was 350 delegates. The delegates came from 15 states and the District of Columbia. At the convention, the name "Radical Democratic Party" was officially adopted.

Different estimates were given on the number of attendees, ranging from 200 to 2,000. Often the number given depended on the political leanings of those making the estimate. In addition to Radical Republicans, there were also a number of Democrats who were unhappy with their own party's perceived lack of dedication to the war against the Confederacy.

=== News coverage ===
Newspapers from across the United States sent reporters to cover the convention, including papers from:

- Boston, Massachusetts (Boston Journal)
- Chicago, Illinois (Chicago Times, Chicago Tribune, Chicago Journal, Illinois Staats-Zeitung)
- Cincinnati, Ohio (Cincinnati Commercial, Cincinnati Gazette; Cincinnati Volks Friend)
- Columbus, Ohio (Ohio Statesman, Columbus Westbote); Philadelphia (Forney's Press); St. Louis (St. Louis Union, St. Louis Nener Auzeiger des Wostens)
- Detroit, Michigan (Detroit Free Press, Detroit Advertizer and Tribune)
- New York City, New York (The New York Times, New York World, New York Herald, New York Tribune)
- Norwich, Connecticut (The Bulletin)
- Rochester, New York (Rochester Democrat)

Reporters from local papers also covered the convention, including reporters from the Cleveland Plain Dealer, Cleveland Herald, and The Cleveland Leader. The nationally syndicated Associated Press also sent Daniel Manning to report on the convention.

== Overview of proceedings ==
On May 30, a preliminary session was held at Elmer's Hall. During this session, several speeches were delivered and several resolutions were adopted. This meeting was primarily hosted in hopes of raising support for the party among German-American voters in the city. A supporter of Grant was appointed temporary chairman, while a supporter of Frémont was appointed chair of the preparations committee.

On May 31, main sessions of the convention were held at Chapin's Hall. It was on that day at Chapin Hall that the nomination was voted upon.

In a session on the morning of June 1, John Cochrane (the vice presidential nominee) formally assumed the permanent chairmanship of the convention and addressed those assembled.

== Convention leadership ==
=== Temporary officers ===
- Temporary president: William Freame Johnston of Pennsylvania (former governor of Pennsylvania)
- Temporary secretaries: B. H. Brooks of California and S. Woolf of the District of Columbia

=== Committee on Permanent Organization and Rules ===
The members of the Committee on Permanent Organization (appointed by the temporary convention present for the purposes of selecting the permanent officers of the convention) were:

- Ezra C. Andrews of Maine
- John Barley of Illinois
- Perkins Bailey of Kansas (judge)
- Caspar Butz of Illinois
- Stephen Symonds Foster of Massachusetts
- William Goodell of New York
- James H. Moss of Missouri (colonel)
- Parker Pillsbury of New Hampshire
- Nathaniel P. Sanger of Pennsylvania
- Nathaniel B. Smithers of Delaware (U.S. congressman)

=== Credentials committee ===
- Jas. Alden
- John A. Millard of New York (colonel)
- N. G. Rodman
- Nathaniel P. Sawyer of Pennsylvania
- John Sullinnen

=== Permanent officers ===
- Permanent president: John Cochrane of New York (general and former U.S. congressman)
- Permanent vice presidents:
  - Mr. Cary of Vermont
  - Bird Beers Chapman of Ohio
  - Henry T. Cheever of Massachusetts (reverend)
  - Charles C. Foote of Michigan (vice presidential nominee of the Liberty Party in 1848)
  - L. Greiner of New Jersey
  - H. Harrison of Missouri
  - James Hill of Maine
  - Dr. Homburg of Indiana
  - J. F. Lezotte of Kansas
  - Alfred J. Lloyd of Pennsylvania
  - Isaac Newstead of Wisconsin
  - T. Olshapen of Missouri
  - Parker Pillsbury of New Hampshire
  - Joseph Plumb of New York
  - Ernest Prussing of Illinois
  - J. Sehrenbog of the District of Columbia
  - W. G. Snethen of Maryland
  - J.P. Sihott of Iowa
  - Edmund Tuttle of Connecticut
  - Thomas P. Wright of Kentucky
- Permanent secretaries:
  - Thomas B. Carroll of New York
  - Carles E. Moss of Missouri
  - James D. Owens of Pennsylvania (colonel)
  - Leonard Van Derear of New York
  - S. Wolf of the District of Columbia

== Other notable participants ==
Among the notable figures who attended or supported the convention included Frederick Douglass, and Elizabeth Cady Stanton. Abolitionist Wendell Phillips did not attend in person, but wrote a letter on behalf of the new organization which was read out. In it, he criticized Lincoln's model of reconstruction, citing the experience of Louisiana following its recapture by Union forces and stated that Lincoln's model "makes the freedom of the negro a sham, and perpetuates Slavery under a softer name".

Among the notable participants present at the convention were:

- Edward Gilbert of New York, politician and president of the Fremont Club of New York City
- B. Gratz Brown, U.S. senator from Missouri
- Carl Hinsira of Massachusetts
- Justus McKinstry of Missouri, general
- Charles Zagonyi, colonel

== Nomination ==
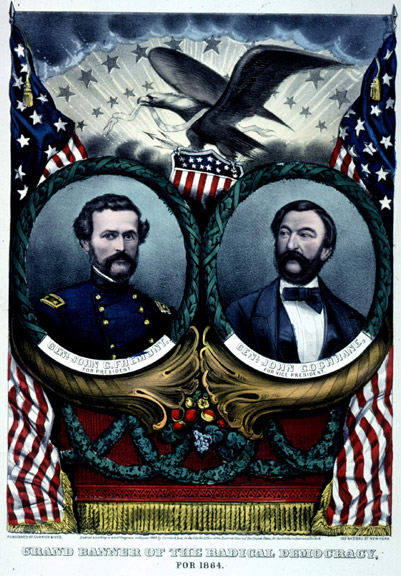
Campaign poster with nominees Frémont and Cochrane

By acclamation, the convention nominated Frémont for president and John Cochrane for vice president.

Frémont was a noted abolitionist, and had been the nominee of the Republican Party in 1856. Cochrane was a War Democrat, as well as a general and former congressman.

Frémont accepted the nomination on June 4, 1864. In his letter, he stated that he would step aside if the National Union Convention would nominate someone other than Lincoln for president.

Cochrane was not only nominated for vice president, but also given position of the permanent president (chairman) of the convention. On the morning of June 1, he formally assumed the chairmanship of the convention and addressed those assembled.

== Platform and resolutions ==
The convention saw the adoption of a thirteen-plank platform.

The platform was passed with little discussion, and a series of resolutions that bogged down the convention proceedings were voted down decisively.

Major provisions of the party's platform included amending the United States Constitution to achieve the abolition of slavery and a ratification of equal rights; amending the constitution to abolish the Electoral College in favor of the direct election of the president; and amending the constitution to impose a term limit of a single term on the presidency.

The platform also called for the continuation of the war without compromise; confiscation of rebel property; control of post-war reconstruction by Congress; and enforcement of the Monroe Doctrine. The also platform made implicit calls for civil service reform.

To appeal to Democrats, the platform adopted emphasized the protection of the rights of free speech, a free press and the writ of habeas corpus as the Democrats had criticized Lincoln on these issues. Historian James M. McPherson has argued that because of the party wishing to appeal to Democrats, it refused to take on specific calls for black suffrage and land grants for freed slaves that it might otherwise have explicitly endorsed.

== Aftermath ==
On September 21, the nominees withdrew and threw their support behind the "regular" Republican ticket that had been nominated at the 1864 National Union National Convention (incumbent president Abraham Lincoln, and vice presidential running-mate Andrew Johnson).
