= John Wheeler (New York politician) =

American politician (1823–1906)

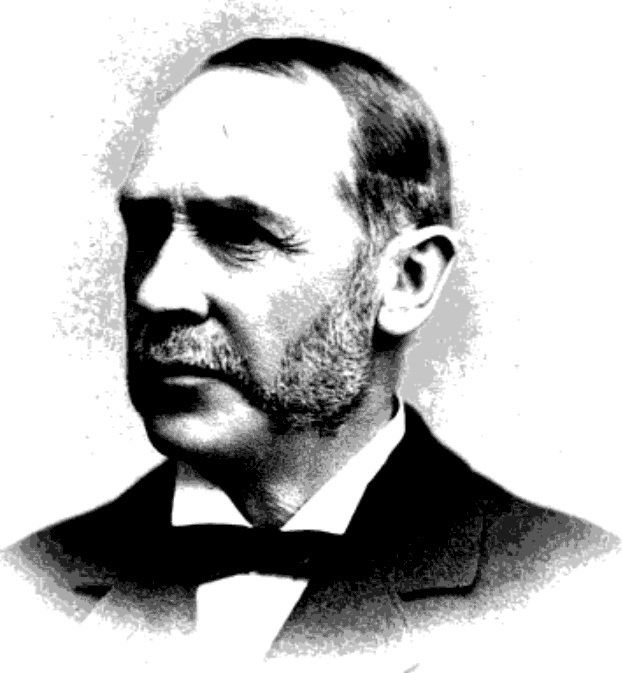

Member of the U.S. House of Representatives from New York's 6th district
- In office March 4, 1853 – March 3, 1857
- Preceded by: James Brooks
- Succeeded by: John Cochrane

Personal details
- Born: February 11, 1823 Humphreysville, Connecticut, U.S.
- Died: April 1, 1906 (aged 83) New York City, U.S.
- Resting place: Woodlawn Cemetery, New York City, U.S.
- Party: Democratic
- Profession: Politician

John Wheeler (February 11, 1823 – April 1, 1906) was a United States representative from New York.

== Biography ==
Wheeler was born in Humphreysville, Connecticut (now Seymour), Connecticut on February 11, 1823. He attended the common schools in Cheshire, Connecticut and moved to New York City in 1843. He was engaged in the hotel business with his father, and later became a dry-goods clerk.

A Democrat, he was elected to the Thirty-third and Thirty-fourth Congresses (March 4, 1853 – March 3, 1857) as the representative of New York's sixth district. Wheeler declined to be a candidate for renomination in 1856 to the Thirty-fifth Congress.

Wheeler served as commissioner and president of the New York City's Department of Taxes and Assessments from 1872 to 1880, and later served as a member of the Board of Estimates and Apportionments and Commissioner of Accounts.

In the 1870s he was a member of the Committee of Seventy, a group of anti-Tammany Hall Democrats who worked to overthrow William M. Tweed, and elected William Frederick Havemeyer as Mayor of New York City.

He died in New York City on April 1, 1906 and was buried at Woodlawn Cemetery.

U.S. House of Representatives
| Preceded by James Brooks | Member of the U.S. House of Representatives from New York's 6th congressional district 1853–1857 | Succeeded by John Cochrane |
