= James Brooks (politician) =

American politician (1807–1873)

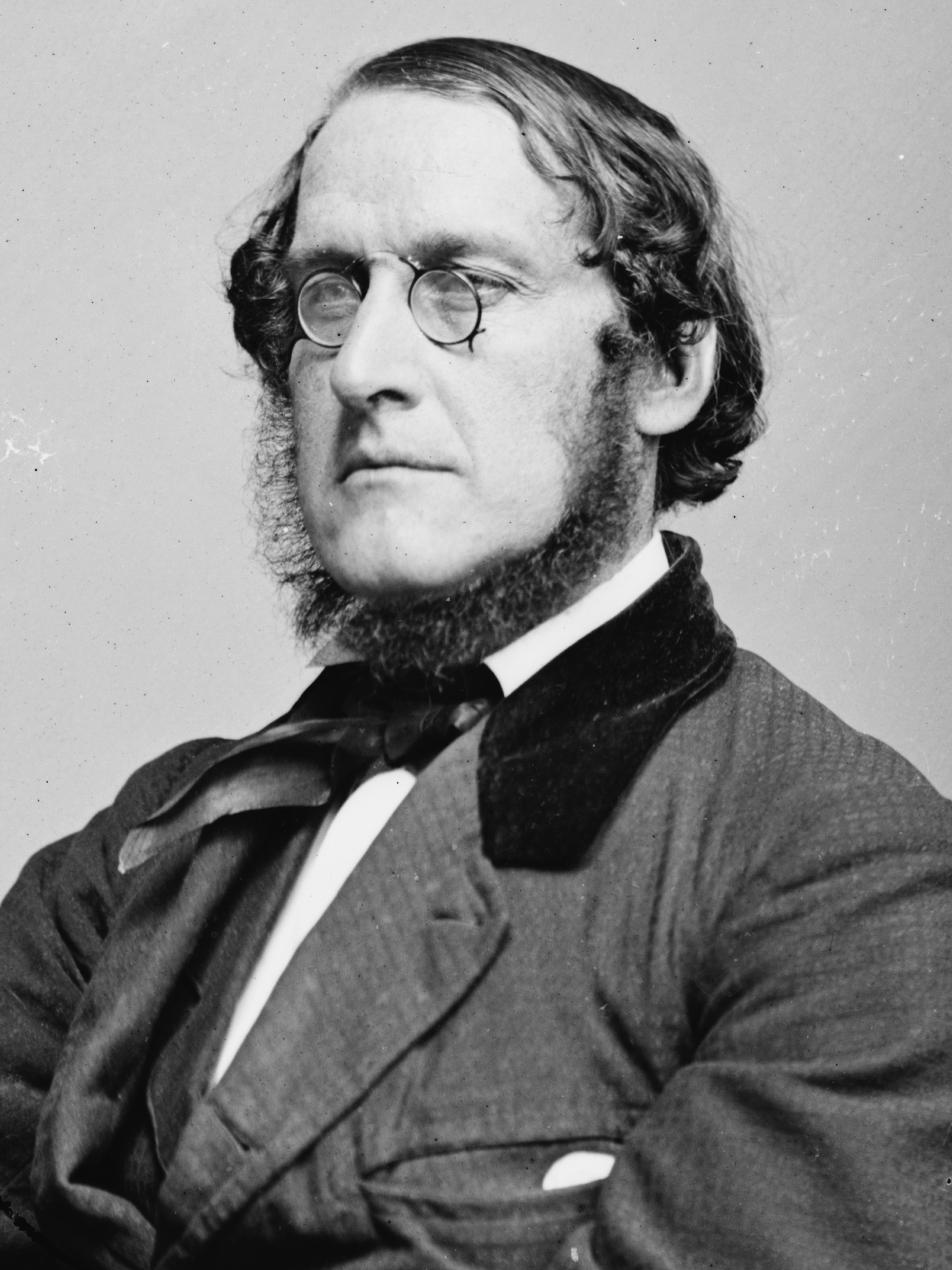

Member of the U.S. House of Representatives from New York
- In office March 4, 1849 – March 4, 1853
- Preceded by: Horace Greeley
- Succeeded by: John Wheeler
- Constituency: 6th district
- In office March 4, 1863 – April 7, 1866
- Preceded by: Isaac C. Delaplaine
- Succeeded by: William E. Dodge
- Constituency: 8th district
- In office March 4, 1867 – April 30, 1873
- Preceded by: William E. Dodge
- Succeeded by: Samuel S. Cox
- Constituency: 8th district (1867–1873); 6th district (1873)

Personal details
- Born: November 10, 1807 Portland, Maine, U.S.
- Died: April 30, 1873 (aged 65) Washington, D.C., U.S.
- Resting place: Green-Wood Cemetery
- Party: Whig (before 1856); Constitutional Union (1860); Democratic (1860–1873)
- Education: Colby College (BA)

James Brooks (November 10, 1807 – April 30, 1873) was an American educator, lawyer, and politician who represented New York City in the United States House of Representatives for seven nonconsecutive terms between 1849 and his death in 1873. Though initially a member of the Whig Party, he later joined the Democratic Party and, as a critic of the Abraham Lincoln administration, rose to become its leader in the House at the end of the American Civil War. He died in office in 1873 while under scrutiny and formal censure for attempted bribery in connection with the Credit Mobilier scandal.

== Personal and education ==
He was born on November 10, 1807, in or near Portland, Maine. State Senator Erastus Brooks (1815–1886) was his brother. As a student, he attended public schools and then the academy at Monmouth, Maine. By the age of 16, he was teaching school, in Lewiston, Maine. He graduated from Waterville College (now Colby College) in 1831.

While reading law with John Neal, Brooks also worked as an editor for the Portland Advertiser.

== Political career ==
After finishing law studies, he worked as the Advertiser's Washington correspondent. He served as a member of the Maine House of Representatives in 1835, introducing legislation that resulted in a survey of the future St. Lawrence and Atlantic Railroad. He lost a Congressional election in 1836. After losing, he moved to New York City and founded the New York Daily Express, where he was editor-in-chief for the rest of his life. He was a member of the New York State Assembly (New York Co., 16th D.) in 1848.

He was elected, as a Whig, to the Thirty-first and Thirty-second Congresses (March 4, 1849 - March 3, 1853). He lost a race for re-election in 1852 and resumed his editorial pursuits.

In the 1860 U.S. presidential election, Brooks would support the Constitutional Union Party ticket of John Bell and Edward Everett, but by the outbreak of the American Civil War, he had come to align himself with Fernando Wood and his Mozart Hall faction of New York City's Tammany Hall. Throughout the conflict, Brooks would serve as one of Wood's chief lieutenants, arguing alongside Wood against the use of coercion or force to restore the Union, resulting in them both being recognized throughout the North as outspoken leaders in the anti-war Copperhead movement.

=== Tenure in Congress ===
Brooks was elected as a Democrat to the Thirty-eighth Congress (March 4, 1863 – March 3, 1865). He presented credentials as a Member-elect to the Thirty-ninth Congress, after a disputed election; he served from March 4, 1865, until April 7, 1866. He was succeeded by William E. Dodge, who had contested the election and won his case.

In 1866, Brooks was elected as a Democrat to the Fortieth Congress, and to the three succeeding Congresses. He was a Member of Congress until his death in 1873.

Brooks served as member of the New York State constitutional convention in 1867. That same year, he was appointed a government director of the Union Pacific Railroad.

=== Censure ===
Brooks was censured by the House of Representatives on February 27, 1873, for attempted bribery, in connection with the Crédit Mobilier of America scandal.

== Death ==
Brooks died in Washington, D.C., April 30, 1873. He was interred at Green-Wood Cemetery, in Brooklyn, New York.

== See also ==
- List of United States representatives expelled, censured, or reprimanded
- List of federal political scandals in the United States
- List of members of the United States Congress who died in office (1790–1899)

U.S. House of Representatives
Preceded by Horace Greeley	Member of the U.S. House of Representatives from New York's 6th congressional district 1849–1853	Succeeded by John Wheeler
Preceded by Isaac C. Delaplaine	Member of the U.S. House of Representatives from New York's 8th congressional district 1863–1866	Succeeded by William E. Dodge
Preceded by William E. Dodge	Member of the U.S. House of Representatives from New York's 8th congressional district 1867–1873	Succeeded by John Lawson
Preceded by Samuel S. Cox	Member of the U.S. House of Representatives from New York's 6th congressional district 1873	Succeeded by Samuel S. Cox
