= Justus McKinstry =

American army officer

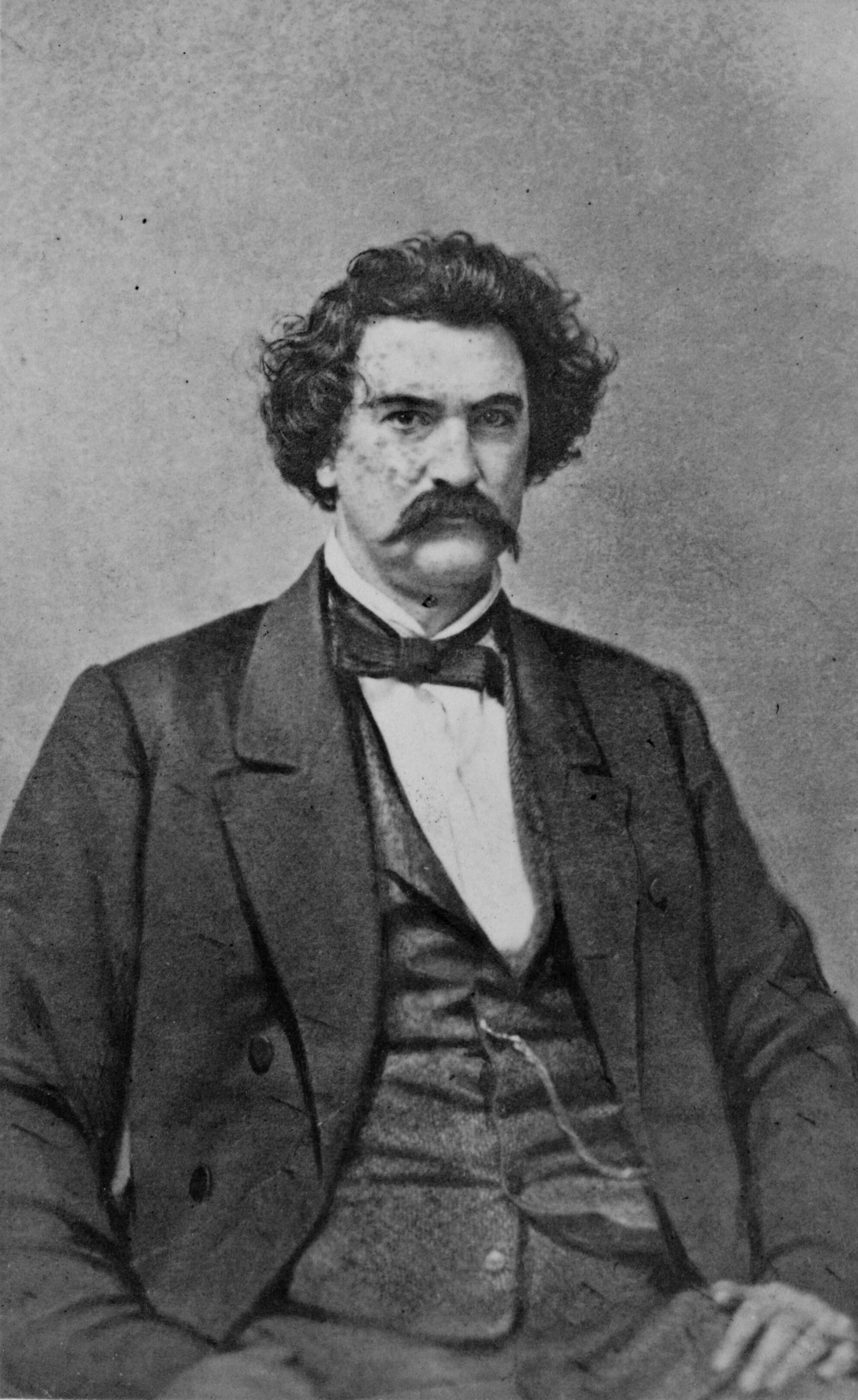
- McKinstry in 1860
- Born: July 6, 1814; Hudson, New York, US
- Died: December 11, 1897 (aged 83); St. Louis, Missouri, US
- Burial place: Ypsilanti, Michigan, US
- Military career
- Allegiance: United States of America
- Branch: United States Army; Union Army
- Service years: 1838–1863
- Rank: Major; Brigadier general appointment expired without confirmation
- Conflicts: Second Seminole War; Third Seminole War; Mexican–American War; American Civil War

Justus McKinstry (July 6, 1814 – December 11, 1897) was a United States Army officer who served in the Second Seminole War and with merit in the Mexican–American War and in the Third Seminole War. He was appointed a brigadier general and assistant quartermaster in the Union Army in the early days of the American Civil War but his appointment expired without being confirmed by the United States Senate. His actual highest rank was major. He was suspended from his appointment and held under arrest starting November 13, 1861, although his confinement was expanded to the city limits of St. Louis, Missouri after February 22, 1862, in anticipation of a court-martial in October 1862. He was convicted of graft, corruption and fraud in the quartermaster's department in the Department of the West. The court recommended his dismissal from the army. On January 28, 1863, after being held in arrest for more than a year, McKinstry was cashiered "for neglect and violation of duty to the prejudice of good order and military discipline." Despite the expiration of his brigadier general appointment without Senate confirmation, some sources, such as Ezra Warner, list McKinstry as a brigadier general. If so regarded, he was one of three Union Army generals who were cashiered. After his dismissal from the Union Army, McKinstry was a speculator and stock broker in New York City, 1864–1867, and land agent in Rolla, Missouri, 1867 – c. 1870, although he spent most of the rest of his life in reduced circumstances in St. Louis.

== Early life ==
Justus McKinstry was born in Hudson, Columbia County, New York, on July 6, 1814. His parents were David McKinstry (born 1778) and Nancy (née Backus) McKinstry. They were married in 1805. In 1815, the McKinstry family, including Justus and three siblings, moved from Hudson, New York to Detroit, Michigan. David McKinstry prospered in Detroit and became influential in the community.

With help from his father, Justus McKinstry entered the United States Military Academy at West Point, New York on July 1, 1832. Fearing that he would fail the math exam at the end of the term and be expelled, McKinstry resigned from the academy in a December 1832 letter and ultimately left on January 31, 1833. He hoped that he might be reinstated and through his father's influence he was readmitted to the next Academy class. McKinstry re-entered the United States Military Academy on July 1, 1833. McKinstry failed a math exam in 1835 but was given an extra year at the academy and graduated 40th in a class of 45 on July 1, 1838.

On July 1, 1838, the day McKinstry graduated from the US Military Academy, he married his second cousin, Susan McKinstry, with whom he would have three sons, Charles, James and Carlisle (Cy).

McKinstry was commissioned as a second lieutenant in the 2nd Infantry Regiment (United States) on July 1, 1838. In quick succession in 1838, he was stationed at Sackett's Harbor, New York and Fort Gratiot, Michigan. By November 1838, he was in Florida for service in the Second Seminole War. in which he served until 1841. For 21 months, except for a few days, McKinstry commanded Company B of the 2d Infantry Regiment, in addition to his quartermaster duties, while the company commander was on recruiting duty. McKinstry was appointed a first lieutenant in the 2nd Infantry Regiment on April 18, 1841. He then served at Fort Niagara, New York, 1842–1844, on recruiting duty, 1845–1846 and at Fort Columbus (later Fort Jay), New York, 1846 before beginning service in the Mexican–American War later that year.

== Mexican–American War ==
On March 3, 1847, McKinstry received the rank of captain, and served as a staff officer and assistant quartermaster. Although he was a quartermaster, McKinstry was awarded a brevet appointment as a major in the Regular Army (United States) for gallant and meritorious conduct after taking command of a company of volunteers at the Battles of Contreras and Churubusco, to rank from August 20, 1847. McKinstry was an original member of the Aztec Club of 1847, which was founded as a military society of officers who served with the United States Army in the Mexican–American War.

== Assignments: 1849–1861 ==
McKinstry resumed his career as a captain on January 12, 1848, vacating his position as a captain in the 2nd Infantry Regiment and serving as a quartermaster with the commissioners running the boundary line on the United States-Mexico border in 1848–1849 and in California, 1850–1855. While in California, McKinstry engaged in a profitable land transaction with his second cousin and brother-in-law, George McKinstry Jr. In 1849, George (1810–1882) bought Rancho Arroyo Chico, a 22,214-acre (89.90 km^{2}) Mexican land grant in present-day Butte County, California, from William Dickey, who had been granted the land in 1844 by Governor Manuel Micheltorena. Also in 1849, McKinstry sold a one-half interest in the land to John Bidwell and in 1850 sold the other half-interest to Justus McKinstry. In 1851, Justus McKinstry sold this half-interest to John Bidwell.

After his service in California, McKinstry was assigned to Fort Myers, Florida in 1856 and Fort Brooke, Florida, 1856–1858. During this 30-month period in Florida, McKinstry served as quartermaster under the close control of Brigadier General William S. Harney and Colonel Gustavus Loomis. In May 1858, McKinstry developed a skin condition at Fort Brooke and was on leave awaiting orders from September 1858 until January 1860. McKinstry was stationed at St. Louis, Missouri as chief quartermaster of the Department of the West on January 10, 1860.

== American Civil War ==
On July 3, 1861, President Abraham Lincoln appointed Major General John C. Fremont to command the Department of the West, headquartered at St. Louis. Already chief quartermaster when Fremont took command of the department, McKinstry was appointed a major and assistant quartermaster in the U.S. Army on August 3, 1861, and continued his assignment in the Department of the West. On August 14, 1861, Department of the West commander Major General John C. Fremont authorized McKinstry to purchase goods at any price and on any terms he found acceptable and also appointed him provost marshal at St. Louis with broad authority to issue regulations and orders. McKinstry's actions in restricting movements into and out of the city, instituting a 9:00 p.m. curfew and censoring the press made him, and Fremont, unpopular with many of the city's residents.

Historian Bruce Catton cites McKinstry as performing a great service to the Union cause by introducing Brigadier General Ulysses S. Grant to Fremont. Fremont had considered appointing Brigadier General John Pope to the important post at Cairo, Illinois but after his meeting with Grant, Fremont decided to appoint Grant instead. McKinstry was an old West Point and regular army friend of Grant and assured Fremont that rumors of Grant's drinking habits were exaggerated and he would be stable if given a responsible command. Fremont had kept Grant waiting for hours after having summoned him to his headquarters in St. Louis. When McKinstry passed by and asked Grant about his wait, Grant told him the circumstances. McKinstry immediately got Fremont's attention and told him that he had observed Grant's gallantry in Mexico and that he was a reliable man for the job.

In response to growing pressure from influential persons such as Missouri Congressman Frank Blair, who was interested in obtaining more contracts for his friends but was unsuccessful in obtaining them from McKinstry, Fremont obtained McKinstry's removal as quartermaster from Quartermaster General Montgomery C. Meigs but kept him as provost marshal and then assigned him to a division command from September 2, 1861, to November 7, 1861, although he was relieved from duty on October 24, 1861.

McKinstry was appointed a brigadier general of volunteers on September 2, 1861, but the appointment expired without confirmation by the United States Senate on July 17, 1862. McKinstry's actual grade remained as major. Fremont assigned McKinstry to command Division 5 of the Department of the West between September 24, 1861, and October 24, 1861, as Fremont's army of five divisions, about 30,000 men, moved out toward Springfield, Missouri in an effort to capture the strategically located town from Confederate Missouri State Guard forces under Major General Sterling Price.

Although McKinstry had been relieved the day before the engagement at Springfield and most of the Union force did not see action there, a detachment of about 300 Union troops under the command of Major Charles Zagonyi drove off the newly recruited and poorly armed Confederate force of about 1,000 men at the First Battle of Springfield, on October 25, 1861. Zagonyi's small Union force briefly occupied the town but withdrew because they had lost many of their horses during the fight and the Confederates would have outnumbered them if they had counter-attacked. On October 27, 1861, Union troops returned to occupy the town in force. Meanwhile, McKinstry came under investigation for his actions as quartermaster.

Fremont was relieved of command on November 2, 1861, and replaced in interim command by Major General David Hunter. On November 11, 1861, Hunter ordered McKinstry to be arrested. On November 13, 1861, McKinstry was suspended. After his arrest, McKinstry was held in close confinement at the St. Louis Arsenal until February 22, 1862, when his confinement was enlarged to the city limits of St. Louis. During his time under suspension and arrest, McKinstry wrote Vindication of Brig. Gen. J. McKinstry, Formerly Quarter-Master, Western Department. Based on an examination of this document, the court-martial record and other circumstances, historian G. E. Rule is more sympathetic to McKinstry's actions and circumstances than many other historians.

In October 1862, he was convicted by court-martial of graft, corruption, and fraud in the quartermaster's office at St, Louis, Missouri." A St. Louis contractor, Child, Pratt & Fox, admitted to making a profit of $280,000 on $800,000 in sales during the few months of McKinstry's command of the quartermaster department at St. Louis. McKinstry required other contractors to sell goods to Child, Pratt & Fox, which sold them to the army at inflated prices and gave McKinstry a share of the profits. McKinstry padded payrolls, forged vouchers and demanded kickbacks during his term as quartermaster. Historian Edward G. Longacre wrote that McKinstry was betrayed by disgruntled associates. Historian Ezra J. Warner wrote that McKinstry "found ample opportunity to line his own pockets. Historian Stewart Sifakis wrote: "While there may well have been other crooks in the uniform of a Union general, New York-born Justus McKinstry was the only one convicted and dismissed during the Civil War." Bruce Catton, on the other hand, noting Frank Blair's anger and complaints against McKinstry, remarked that McKinstry "was blamed (whether justly or unjustly) for all manner of malpractices." Allan Nevins also cites Frank Blair's interference with Fremont and efforts to get McKinstry to give contracts to Blair's shady friends, without placing blame on McKinstry for supply problems.

On January 28, 1863, after more than a year under arrest and three months after his court martial hearings, McKinstry was cashiered "for neglect and violation of duty to the prejudice of good order and military discipline." Warner noted that McKinstry was one of only three Union Army generals to be cashiered during the American Civil War. Warner and Longacre state that McKinstry's sentence was the only one of its kind given to a general officer during the war.

== Later life and death ==
McKinstry attended the 1864 Radical Democratic National Convention.

After his dismissal from the Union Army, McKinstry was a speculator, stock broker in New York City, 1864–1867 and land agent in Rolla, Missouri, 1867–1870. After that, Driscoll states that McKinstry survived on "dreams, schemes and sinecures from St. Louis associates."

Some time between 1863 and 1865, Susan McKinstry and the McKinstrys' three sons moved from St. Louis to Ypsilanti, Michigan. The McKinstrys were never reunited, although there is some evidence they occasionally were in touch. Susan McKinstry was impoverished after 1869. Susan McKinstry died in 1892 and a marriage certificate from St. Louis shows that Justus McKinstry married Adelaide Dickinson in 1895.

Justus McKinstry died on December 11, 1897, at St. Louis, Missouri. He is buried at Highland Cemetery, Ypsilanti, Michigan.

== See also ==
- List of American Civil War generals (Union)
- Quartermaster Corps (United States Army)
- Quartermaster General of the United States Army
