= Isaac C. Delaplaine =

American politician

Member of the U.S. House of Representatives from 's 8th district
- In office March 4, 1861 – March 3, 1863
- Preceded by: Horace F. Clark
- Succeeded by: James Brooks

Personal details
- Born: October 27, 1817 New York City, New York
- Died: July 17, 1866 (aged 48) New York City, New York
- Resting place: Green-Wood Cemetery; Brooklyn, New York
- Party: Democratic
- Spouse: Matilda Post (m. 1838–1866, his death)
- Children: 2
- Education: Columbia College
- Profession: Attorney

Isaac Clason Delaplaine (October 27, 1817 – July 17, 1866) was a lawyer and politician who was a U.S. representative from New York for one term during the American Civil War.

== Early life ==
Delaplaine was born in New York City on October 27, 1817. He was a son of John Ferris Delaplaine (1786–1854), a successful merchant (whose firm, J. F. Delaplaine & Co., subscribed to a $10,000 government loan to help finance the War of 1812), and Julia Ann (née Clason) Delaplaine (1794-1866). His brother John Ferris Delaplaine Jr. (1815–1885), served as secretary of the U.S. legation in Vienna from 1866 to 1883.

=== Education ===
He graduated from Columbia College (now Columbia University) in 1834. At Columbia, Isaac C. Delaplaine was a member of the Philolexian Society. He received a gold medal for finishing first in his class, as well as silver medals for placing first in studies of: moral and political philosophy; Greek and Roman literature; and mathematics and astronomy. He received the bronze medal for second place in natural, experimental and mechanical philosophy.

Delaplaine received a master's degree from Columbia in 1837. He studied law, was admitted to the bar in 1840, and practiced in New York City.

== Career ==
He was elected as a Democrat to the Thirty-seventh Congress serving from March 4, 1861 to March 3, 1863. Serving during the American Civil War, Delaplaine joined most other Democrats in supporting Abraham Lincoln's war measures, but opposing the emancipation of slaves and the suspension of Habeas corpus.

== Family ==
In 1838, Delaplaine married Matilda Post (1821–1907). They were the parents of two daughters:

- Julie M. Delaplaine (1840–1915), who married attorney George Richard Schieffelin (1836–1910), the only son of Richard Lawrence Schieffelin.
- Florence Delaplaine (1849–1926), who married James Hude Beekman, in 1880. After his death in 1902, she married banker Gustav Amsinck, in 1904. After his death in 1909, she married, as his second wife, U.S. Representative Hamilton Fish II, son of Hamilton Fish, former Governor of New York, U.S. Secretary of State, and U.S. Senator, in 1912.

=== Descendants ===
Through his daughter Julie, he was grandfather to Julia Florence Schieffelin (1867–1963), and Matilda Constance Schieffelin (1877–1963), who married two Ismay brothers, Charles Bower Ismay and Joseph Bruce Ismay (both sons of Thomas Henry Ismay), as well as Margaret Helen Schieffelin (1870–1949), who married sportsman Henry Graff Trevor, founder of the Shinnecock Hills Golf Club, Sarah Dorothy Schieffelin (1875–1945), and George Richard Delaplaine Schieffelin (1884–1950), who married Louise Scribner, a daughter of publisher Charles Scribner II.

== Death and burial ==
He died of apoplexy (what is now called a stroke) in New York City on July 17, 1866. He was interred in Green-Wood Cemetery in Brooklyn, New York. His widow died at her residence, 64 West 50th Street, on September 30, 1907.

U.S. House of Representatives
Preceded by Horace F. Clark	Member of the U.S. House of Representatives from New York's 8th congressional district 1861–1863	Succeeded by James Brooks
