= John Cochrane (politician) =

Military general, politician, and lawyer

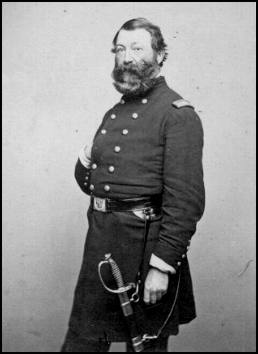

28th Attorney General of New York
- In office January 1, 1864 – December 31, 1865
- Governor: Horatio Seymour; Reuben Fenton
- Preceded by: Daniel S. Dickinson
- Succeeded by: John H. Martindale

Member of the U.S. House of Representatives from New York's 6th district
- In office March 4, 1857 – March 3, 1861
- Preceded by: John Wheeler
- Succeeded by: Frederick A. Conkling

Personal details
- Born: August 27, 1813 Palatine, New York, U.S.
- Died: February 7, 1898 (aged 84) New York City, New York, U.S.
- Party: Democratic
- Other political affiliations: Radical Democratic (1864)
- Education: Hamilton College

Military service
- Allegiance: United States
- Branch/service: Union Army
- Years of service: 1861–1863
- Rank: Brigadier General
- Commands: 65th New York Volunteer Infantry
- Battles/wars: American Civil War; Peninsula campaign; Battle of Fredericksburg

John Cochrane (August 27, 1813 – February 7, 1898) was an American lawyer, soldier, and politician from New York. He was a U.S. representative, the New York attorney general, and a Union Army general.

== Early life ==
John Cochrane was born in Palatine, New York on August 27, 1813, the grandson of John Cochran, Surgeon General of the Continental Army. He studied first at Union College, but then graduated from Hamilton College in 1831. While attending Union College, he became a member of the Sigma Phi Society. Afterwards he studied law, was admitted to the bar in 1834, practiced in Oswego and Schenectady, and then moved to New York City.

== Career ==
In 1852, he campaigned for Franklin Pierce who appointed him Surveyor of the Port of New York in 1853.

=== U.S. Representative ===
In 1856, he was elected U.S. Representative from New York's 6th District as a Democrat, and re-elected in 1858, serving in the 35th Congress and 36th Congress, from 1857 to 1861. In Congress he took a prominent part in debates on land reform, revenue, and other public questions. He was defeated for re-election in 1860.

=== Civil War ===
At the outbreak of the American Civil War he became a colonel of the 65th New York Volunteer Infantry (also known as the 1st United States Chasseurs), which he commanded in the Peninsular Campaign. In July 1862, he was promoted to brigadier general of volunteers, but resigned his commission in February 1863, ostensibly on account of failing health but more likely as a result of his political maneuverings after Fredericksburg. Before that date, he had commanded a brigade under Brigadier General John Newton of the VI Corps. This brigade was present at the Battle of Fredericksburg. Cochrane had also agitated for the removal of Ambrose Burnside as commander of the Army of the Potomac. Alexander Shaler replaced Cochrane as commander of the brigade.

=== Later political career ===
Cochrane was New York State Attorney General from 1864 to 1865, elected on the ticket which was nominated by the Union State Convention including Republicans and War Democrats.

In 1864, he was nominated by the Radical Democratic Party for the vice-presidency on the ticket with John C. Frémont, but Frémont soon withdrew. He was a delegate to the 1868 Republican National Convention.

As leader of the New York delegation to the Liberal Republican Convention at Cincinnati in 1872, he was instrumental in securing the nomination of Horace Greeley for the presidency.

Afterwards he became a Democrat again, and was elected a Sachem of Tammany Hall. In 1872 and 1873, he was President of the Common Council of New York City. As such he was Acting Mayor of New York when Mayor A. Oakey Hall temporarily retired during the Tweed investigation.

== Personal life ==
Cochrane, who was a member of the Society of the Cincinnati, died at his home at 7 East Sixty-Second Street in Manhattan, and was buried at Albany Rural Cemetery in Menands, New York.

== See also ==
- List of American Civil War generals (Union)

== Sources ==
- United States Congress. "John Cochrane (id: C000570)". Biographical Directory of the United States Congress. Retrieved on August 17, 2008
- Staff (September 16, 1863) Nomination for New York State Attorney General, The New York Times
- Staff (February 9, 1898) Obituary, The New York Times
- Political Graveyard entry
- List of New York Attorneys General Office of the New York State Attorney General

Legal offices
Preceded by Daniel S. Dickinson	New York State Attorney General; 1864–1865	Succeeded by John H. Martindale
U.S. House of Representatives
Preceded by John Wheeler	Member of the U.S. House of Representatives from New York's 6th congressional district 1857–1861	Succeeded by Frederick A. Conkling
