= Parker Pillsbury =

American minister, abolitionist and advocate for women's rights

Parker Pillsbury (September 22, 1809 – July 7, 1898) was an American minister and advocate for abolition and women's rights.

== Life ==
Pillsbury was born in Hamilton, Massachusetts. He moved to Henniker, New Hampshire where he later farmed and worked as a wagoner.

With the encouragement of his local Congregational church, Pillsbury entered Gilmanton Theological Seminary in 1835, graduating in 1839. He studied an additional year at Andover, and there came under the influence of social reformer John A. Collins, before being employed at a church in Loudon, New Hampshire. His work in the ministry suffered after he made a number of harsh accusations on the churches' complicity with slavery. His Congregational license to preach was revoked in 1840. However Pillsbury became active in the ecumenical Free Religious Association and preached to its societies in New York, Ohio, and Michigan.

Pillsbury's hostility to slavery led him into active writing and lecturing for the abolitionist movement and other progressive social reform issues. He became a lecturing agent for the New Hampshire, Massachusetts, and American antislavery societies, and held these posts for over two decades. He edited the Concord (N.H.) Herald of Freedom in 1840, and again in 1845 and 1846. In 1854, he served as an emissary from the American Anti-Slavery Society to Great Britain. He stayed with the surgeon John Estlin and his abolitionist daughter Mary Estlin. Both John and Mary became involved in Pillsbury's problematic correspondence with the British activist Louis Chamerovzow.

Pillsbury lectured widely on abolition and social reform, often in the company of fellow abolitionist Stephen Symonds Foster. He earned a reputation for successfully dealing with hostile crowds through non-resistance tactics. His support for non-resistance led to service on the executive committee of the New Hampshire Non-Resistance Society. Consequently, Pillsbury was not an active supporter of the Union (American Civil War) effort. However, he defended the actions of John Brown after the raid on Harper's Ferry, and he applauded Lincoln's Emancipation Proclamation. He was a supporter of the abolitionist Radical Democratic Party, which challenged Lincoln during the 1864 presidential election. He was a participant at the party's national convention. However, the party refused to endorse some of his more radical proposals regarding black suffrage and land redistribution for freed slaves.

In 1865, Pillsbury broke with longtime associate William Lloyd Garrison over the need for continued activity by the American Anti-Slavery Society. He edited the National Anti-Slavery Standard in 1866.

Pillsbury helped to draft the constitution of the feminist American Equal Rights Association in 1865, and served as vice-president of the New Hampshire Woman Suffrage Association. With feminist Elizabeth Cady Stanton, Pillsbury served as co-editor for the women's rights newsletter The Revolution, founded in 1868.

Pillsbury completed his abolition memoirs, Acts of the Anti-Slavery Apostles, in 1883.

His nephew, Albert E. Pillsbury, drafted the bylaws of the NAACP.
