= Horace F. Clark =

American politician

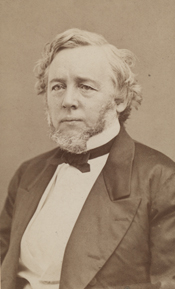

Member of the U.S. House of Representatives from New York's 8th district
- In office March 4, 1857 – March 3, 1861
- Preceded by: Abram Wakeman
- Succeeded by: Isaac C. Delaplaine

Personal details
- Born: November 29, 1815 Southbury, Connecticut, US
- Died: June 19, 1873 (aged 57) New York City, US
- Party: Democratic; Anti-Lecompton Democrat
- Spouse: Maria Louisia Vanderbilt
- Education: Williams College
- Occupation: lawyer, railroad executive

Horace Francis Clark (November 29, 1815 – June 19, 1873) was an American politician and railroad executive who served two terms as a U.S. representative from New York from 1857 to 1861.

== Biography ==
Clark was born in Southbury, Connecticut on November 29, 1815, the son of Reverend Daniel Atkinson Clark (1779-1840) and Eliza (Barker) Clark (1787-1864). In 1833 Clark graduated from Williams College in Williamstown, Massachusetts. He studied law, was admitted to the bar in 1837, and commenced practice in New York City. In 1848 he married Maria Louisa Vanderbilt, the daughter of Cornelius Vanderbilt, and they were the parents of a daughter, Mary Louise, wife of Clarence Lyman Collins, a Wall Street cotton broker (and mother of Edith Lyman Collins, who became the Polish Countess Czaykowski in 1897, and the French Marquise de Maleissye in 1911). Mary Louise Clark Collins died in 1894. As a result of his family connection to Vanderbilt, Clark became involved in several of Vanderbilt's business ventures, including shipping, banking, and railroads.

=== Tenure in Congress ===
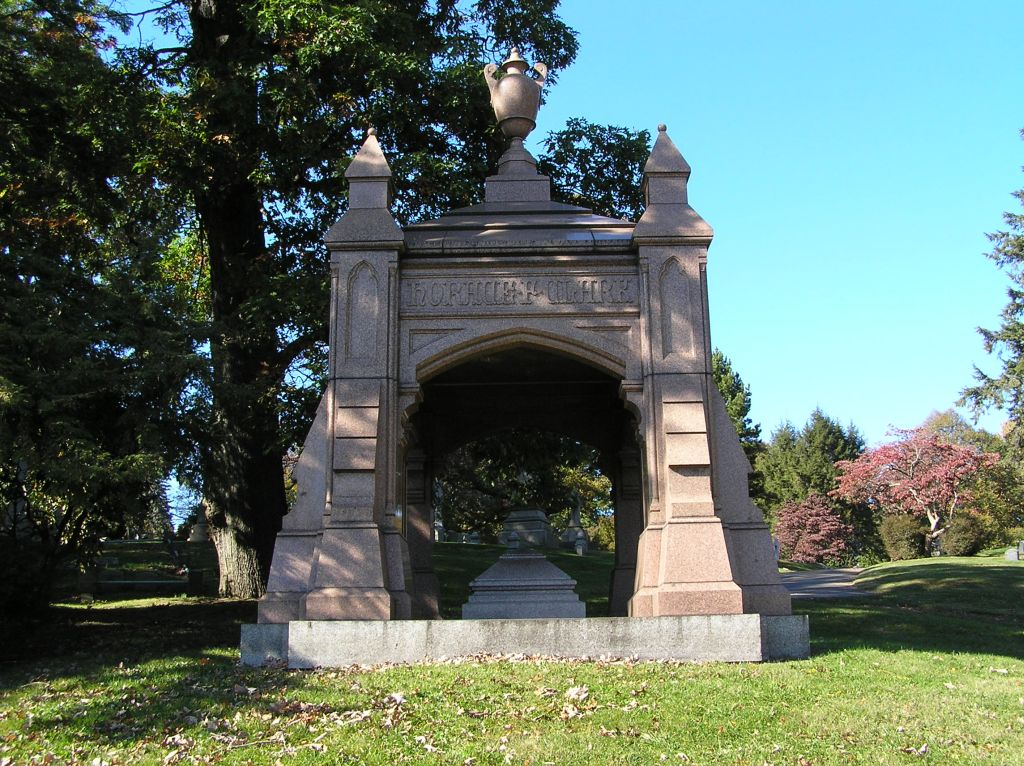
The mausoleum of Horace Clark

In 1856, Clark was elected to Congress as a Democrat, and he was reelected in 1858 as an Anti-Lecompton Democrat. Clark served in the Thirty-fifth and Thirty-sixth Congresses (March 4, 1857 to March 3, 1861).

=== Later career ===
Clark returned to his business interests after leaving Congress, and served as president of the Union Trust Company, Union Pacific Railroad, Michigan Southern Railroad, and other businesses. In addition, he served on the board of directors of Western Union, and the New York Central and New York, New Haven, and Hartford Railroads.

=== Death and burial ===
He died in New York City on June 19, 1873, and was interred at Woodlawn Cemetery in Bronx, New York.

== Sources ==
=== Books ===
- Hall, Henry (1895). America's Successful Men of Affairs. Vol. 1. New York, NY: New York Tribune.
- Jennings, Isaac (1869). Memorials of a Century: Embracing a Record of Individuals and Events Chiefly in the Early History of Bennington, VT. and its First Church. Boston, MA: Gould and Lincoln. p. 113.
- Spencer, Thomas E. (1998). Where They're Buried. Baltimore, MD: Clearfield Company. p. 234. ISBN 978-0-8063-4823-0.

Business positions
Preceded by Thomas Alexander Scott	President of Union Pacific Railroad; 1872–1873	Succeeded by John Duff
U.S. House of Representatives
Preceded by Abram Wakeman	Member of the U.S. House of Representatives from New York's 8th congressional district 1857–1861	Succeeded by Isaac C. Delaplaine
