= Radical Democratic Party (United States) =

American political party

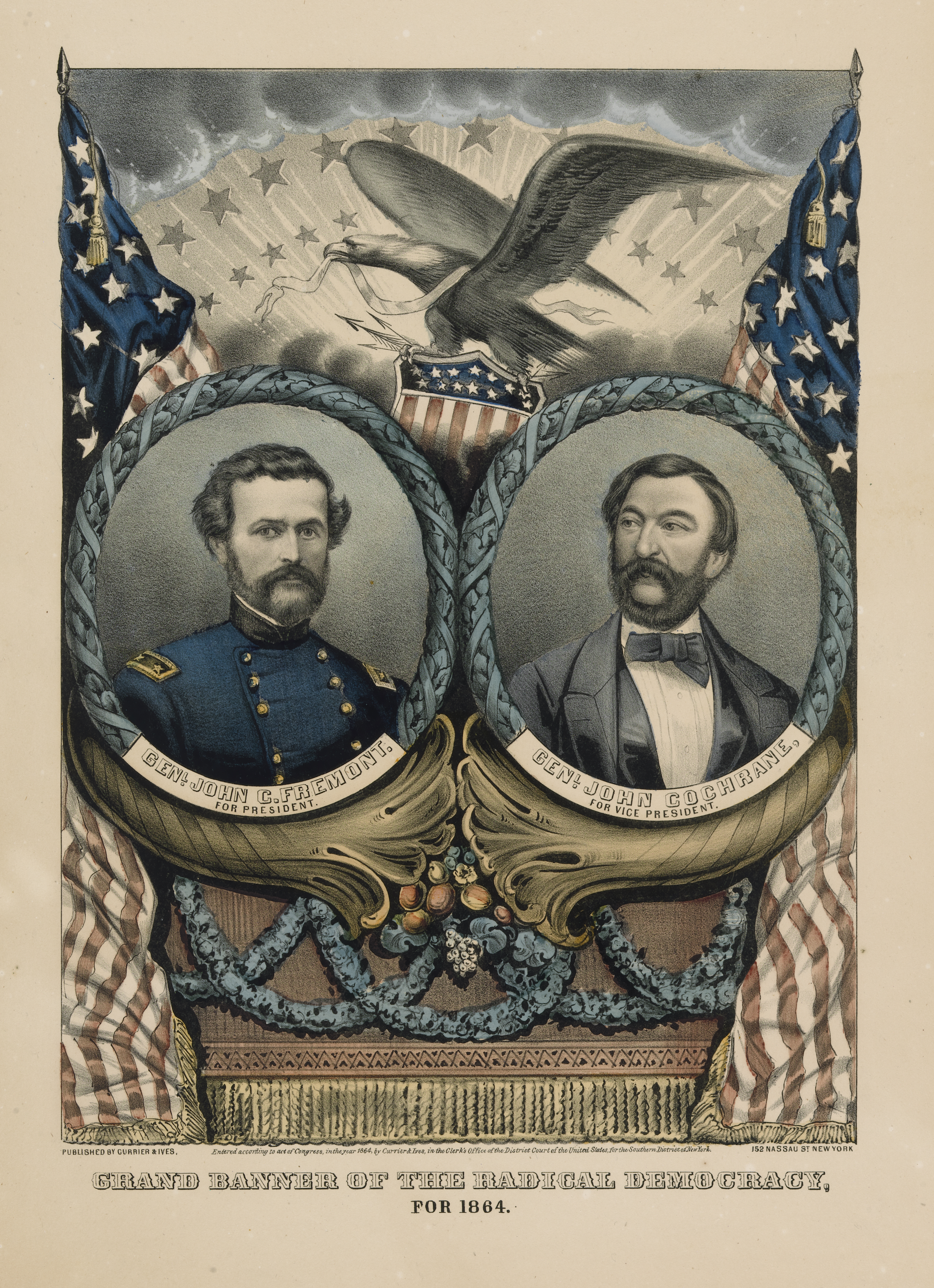
- Other name: Radical Democracy
- Founded: May 1864
- Dissolved: September 1864
- Split from: Republican Party; War Democrats
- Preceded by: Radical faction of the Republican Party
- Merged into: National Union Party: Republican Party; War Democrats
- Succeeded by: Radical faction of the Republican Party
- Newspaper: New Nation
- Ideology: Abolitionism; Unconditional Unionism; Hardline Reconstruction; Radicalism; Pro-civil liberties Pro-political reform
- Political position: Big tent

The Radical Democratic Party, alternately the Radical Democracy, was an abolitionist political party in the United States in 1864. It nominated John C. Frémont in the 1864 United States presidential election with John Cochrane as vice president. Frémont's candidacy failed to gain momentum, and he withdrew from the race on September 22, 1864 in favor of the eventual winner, the incumbent president and National Union candidate Abraham Lincoln.

== History ==
=== Cleveland convention ===
The new party convened in Chapin's Hall in Cleveland, Ohio on at the end of May 1864, one week before the Republican convention. Different estimates were given on the number of attendees, ranging from 200 to 2,000. Often the number given depended on the political leanings of those making the estimate. As well as Radical Republicans, there were also a number of Democrats who were unhappy with their own party's perceived lack of dedication to the war against the Confederacy. Noted abolitionist and previous Republican presidential candidate John C. Frémont was nominated for President while the War Democrat John Cochrane was nominated as Vice President. Among the notable figures who attended or supported the convention were Frederick Douglass, Elizabeth Cady Stanton and Parker Pillsbury. Abolitionist Wendell Phillips did not attend in person, but wrote a letter on behalf of the new organization which was read out. In it, he criticized Lincoln's model of reconstruction, citing the experience of Louisiana following its recapture by Union forces and stated that Lincoln's model "makes the freedom of the negro a sham, and perpetuates Slavery under a softer name".

The platform adopted at Cleveland called for the continuation of the war without compromise, a Constitutional amendment banning slavery and authorizing equal rights, confiscation of rebel property, control of post-war reconstruction by Congress and enforcement of the Monroe Doctrine. The platform also called for a one-term Presidency as well as other implicit calls for civil service reform. To appeal to Democrats, the platform adopted emphasized the protection of the rights of free speech, a free press and the writ of habeas corpus as the Democrats had criticized Lincoln on these issues. Historian James M. McPherson has argued that because of the party wishing to appeal to Democrats, it refused to take on specific calls for black suffrage and land grants for freed slaves that it might otherwise have explicitly endorsed.

=== Campaign ===
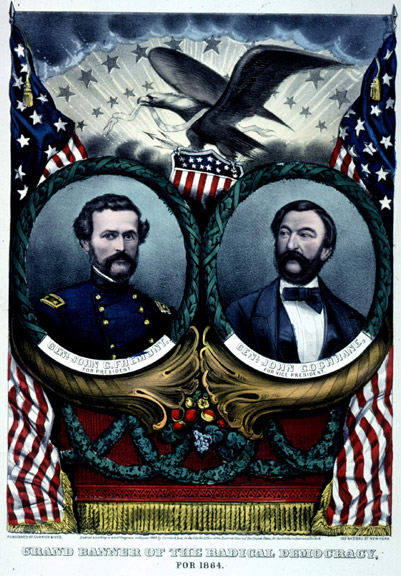
Frémont and Cochrane campaign poster

Many of the new party's supporters did not necessarily want it to stand in the election. Rather, the hope was that the formation of a new party would cause Lincoln not to gain the Republican nomination. Although this did not occur, Frémont maintained over the course of his campaign that he would drop out if Lincoln did likewise, in favor of a candidate whose platform more closely matched the ideals of the Radical Republicans.

Frémont gained the support of a number of prominent abolitionists. However, the majority of Radical Republicans continued to support Lincoln as it was felt that Frémont could not win and that supporting him would split the abolitionist vote in favor of the Democratic candidate George McClellan. Additionally, many were less than enthusiastic about the party platform with its compromises aiming to attract Democrats. Frémont continued these overtures during his campaign. As the campaign failed to gain momentum, many abolitionists urged Frémont to withdraw his nomination. No major newspaper supported Frémont. However, some Democrat-supporting newspapers such as the New York World did talk up Frémont's credentials in order to disunite Republicans. Confederates as well as Democrats took a close interest in Frémont's campaign, hoping it could help McClellan win in November.

=== Withdrawal ===
Frémont and Cochrane dropped out of the race on September 21, 1864. In a letter to The New York Times, Frémont wrote that it had become increasingly clear that the Democrats could not be trusted on the issues of union or abolition. As such, he did not want to act as a spoiler against Lincoln. At the same time, Frémont remained critical of Lincoln, writing that "his Administration has been politically, militarily and financially, a failure, and that its necessary continuance is a cause of regret for the country". In another letter to the same paper written one week previously, but published in the same edition, he wrote that the ideas of the Radical Democratic Party would nevertheless be pursued. It has been speculated that Frémont's withdrawal may have been part of a deal with Lincoln whereby the more conservative Postmaster General Montgomery Blair was removed from his post.

Most Radical Democratic Party supporters went on to support Lincoln in the general election, though there were some exceptions to this, notably Wendell Philips. The party itself was finished, having only formed to run a candidate in the 1864 election.

== See also ==
- Liberty Party (United States, 1840)
