= Levin Corbin Handy =

American photographer (1855–1932)

Levin C. Handy
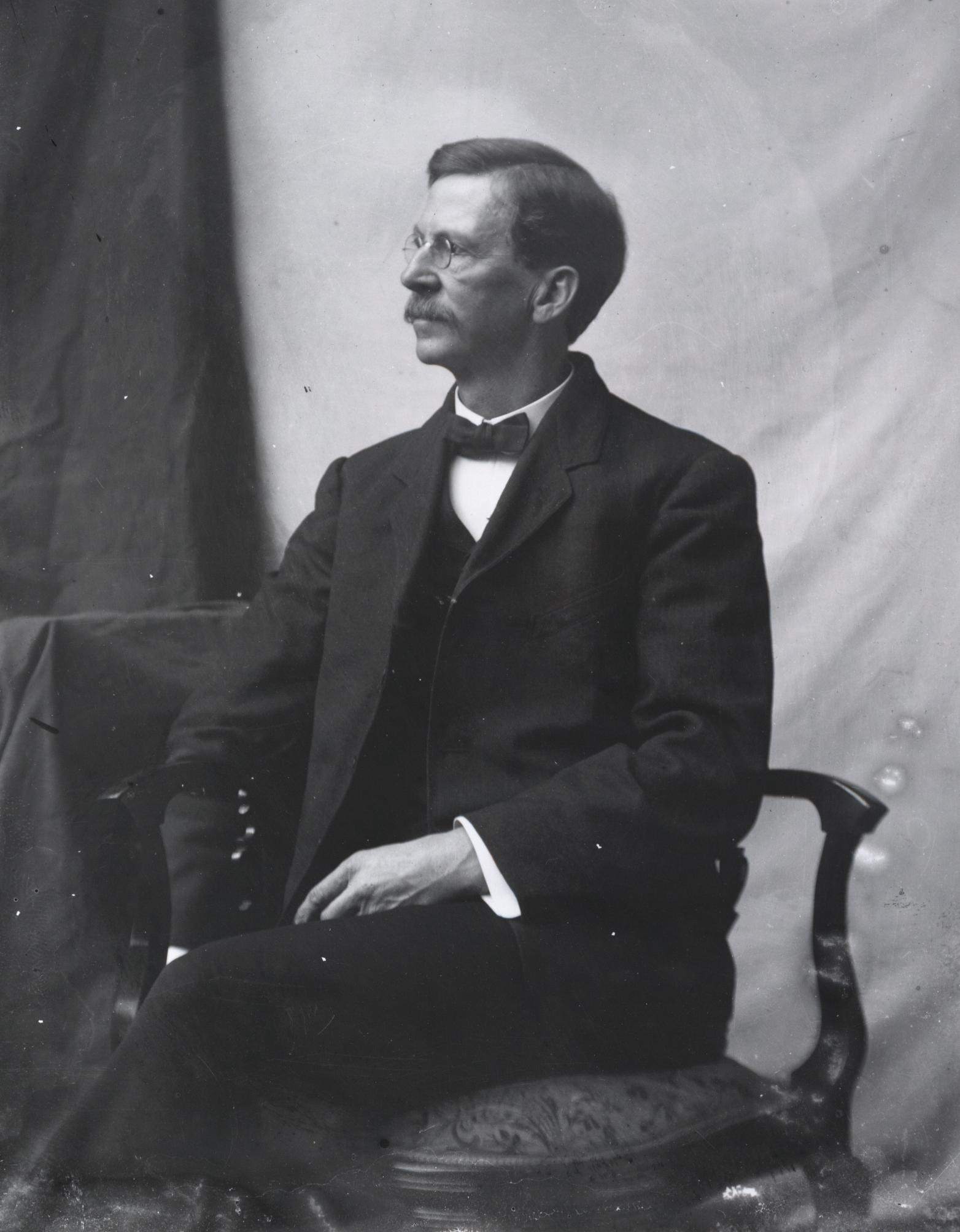
- Born: August 10, 1855; Washington, D.C., U.S.
- Died: March 26, 1932 (aged 76); Washington, D.C., U.S.
- Relatives: Mathew Brady (uncle by marriage)

Levin Corbin Handy (August 10, 1855 – March 26, 1932) was an American photographer who worked during the 19th and early 20th century.

Civil War photographer Mathew Brady was Handy's uncle by marriage, and Handy was apprenticed to him at age twelve. After a few years of working in Brady's studio, he was a skilled camera operator. Later, Handy became an independent photographer in Washington, D.C. In the 1880s, he formed a partnership with Samuel C. Chester; following that, he and Chester worked as partners with Brady. Handy shot individual portraits, and provided photographic and photoduplication services for United States Federal agencies. Between 1880 and 1896, he documented the construction of the Library of Congress's Thomas Jefferson Building.

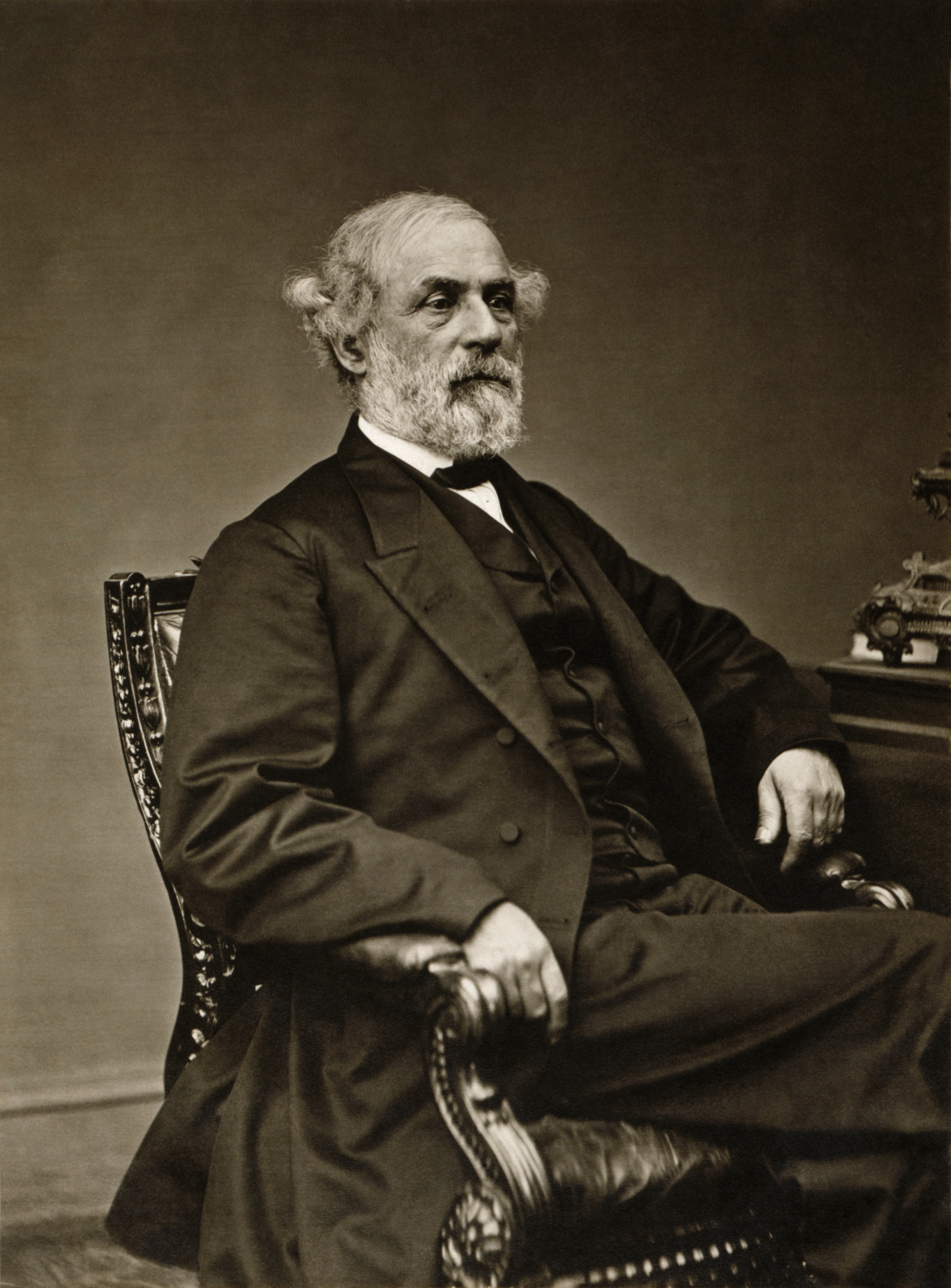
Levin Handy photograph of Confederate General Robert E. Lee

Following his uncle's death in 1896, Handy acquired Mathew Brady's remaining files of photographs. When Handy died, he left his and Brady's work to his daughters, Alice H. Cox and Mary H. Evans; in 1954, the Library of Congress purchased approximately 10,000 of these negatives from Handy's daughters.
