= 1864 National Union National Convention =

American political convention

- 1864 presidential election
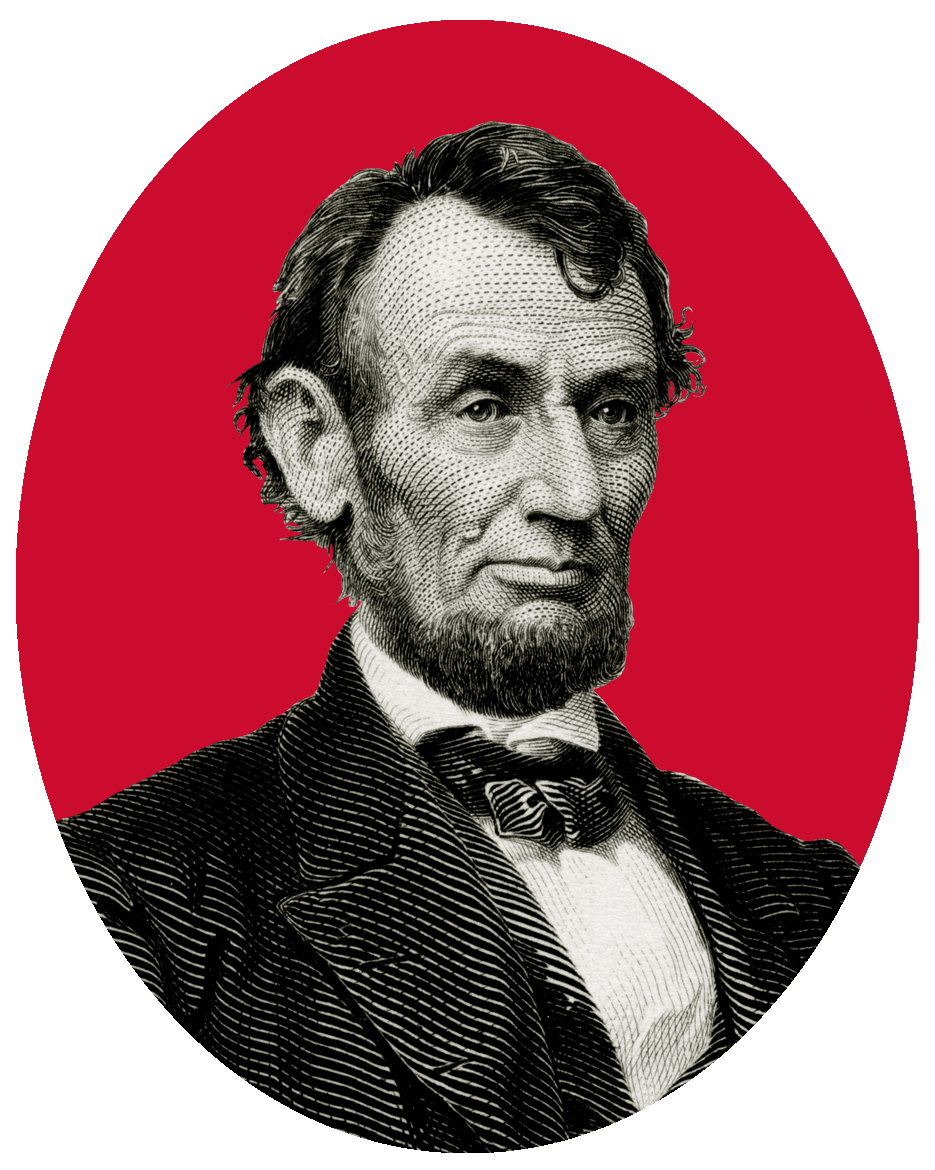
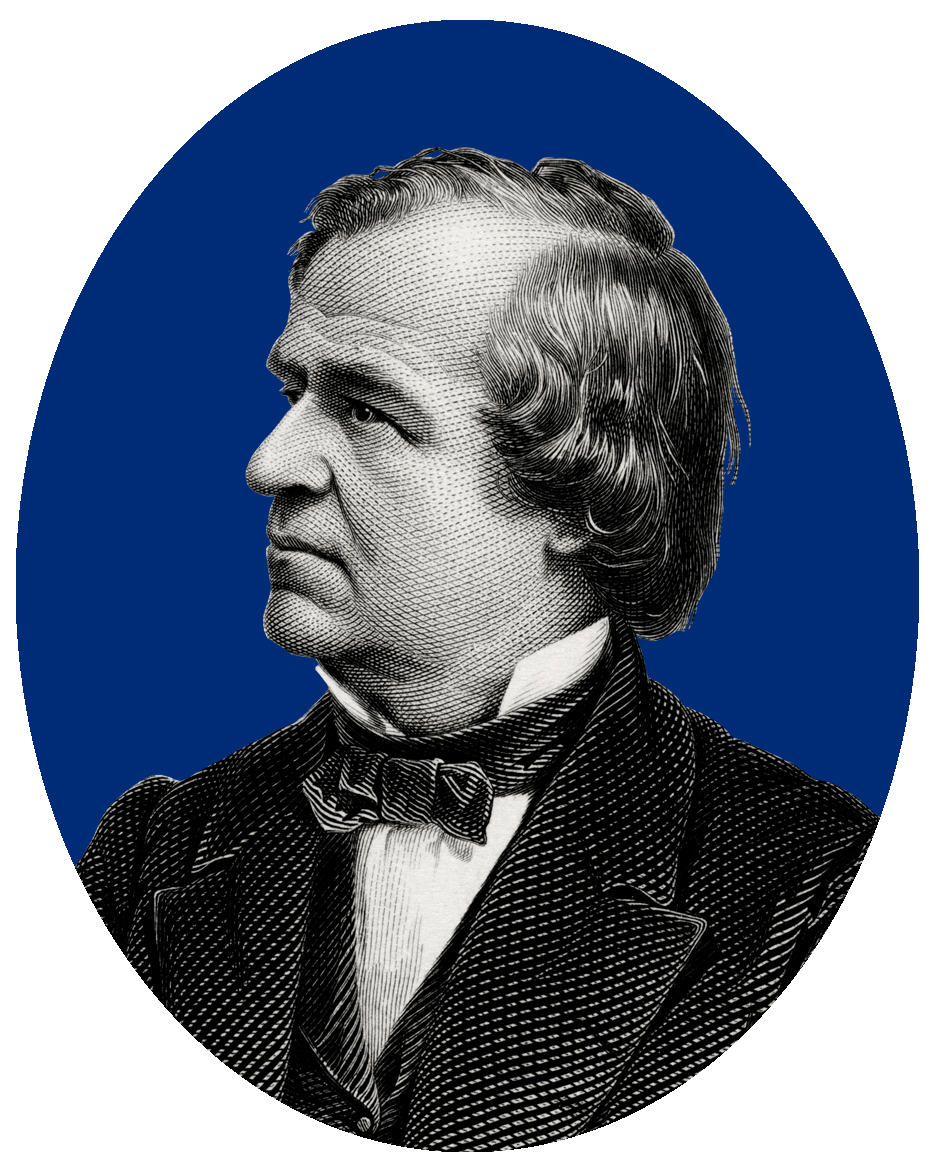
- Nominees; Lincoln and Johnson

Convention
- Dates: National Union; June 7–8, 1864
- City: Baltimore, Maryland
- Venue: Front Street Theater

Candidates
- Presidential nominee: Abraham Lincoln of Illinois
- Vice-presidential nominee: Andrew Johnson of Tennessee

The 1864 National Union Convention was held by the National Union Party in Baltimore, Maryland on June 7 and 8, 1864. "National Union" was the name adopted by the main faction of the Republican Party in 1864. It represented a coalition of Republicans, most War Democrats, and other Unionists. The National Union renominated Abraham Lincoln for president and nominated Andrew Johnson vice president. At the convention, the party adopted a platform calling for a victorious end in the ongoing Civil War, the eradication of slavery by constitutional amendment, and the enforcement of the Emancipation Proclamation. The proceedings were transcribed by Dennis Francis Murphy, member of the Official Corps of Reporters for the U.S. Senate.

== Background ==
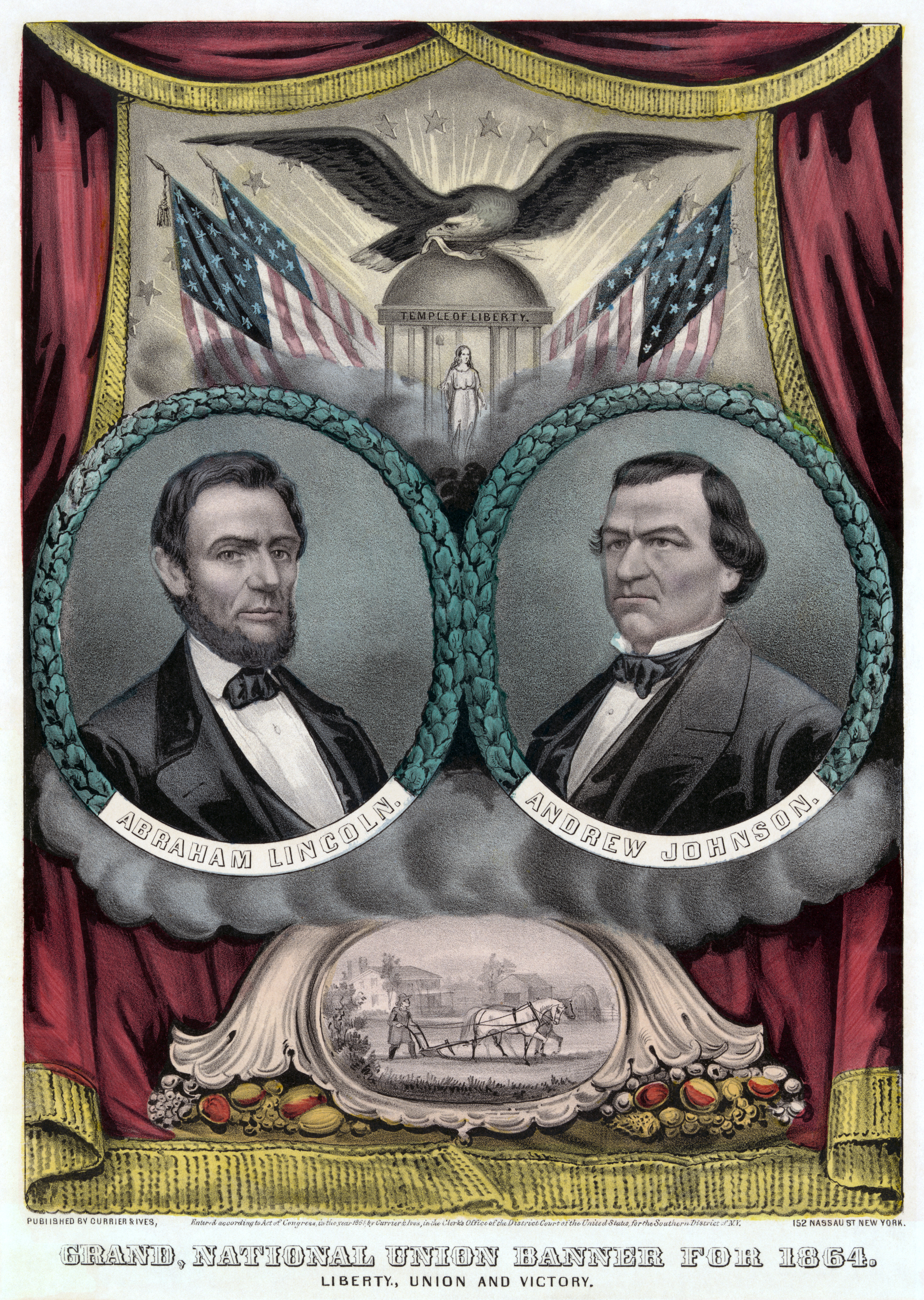
Lincoln and Johnson campaign poster

Since 1861, in many state elections, Republicans had allied under the "Union" label with War Democrats who supported Lincoln's military policy and with "Conservative Unionists" in the Border States.

In the 1864 presidential election, Lincoln sought re-election.

Some Radical Republicans, a hard-line faction within Lincoln's own party, believed that Lincoln was incompetent and therefore could not be re-elected. They formed the Radical Democratic Party, which held it's convention in Cleveland, and had an unknown amount of attendance, somewhere between 200-2000 delegates, with accounts varying heavily. They eventually nominated John C. Frémont, who had been the Republicans' first presidential nominee, in the 1856 election. They hoped that this would cause someone other than Lincoln to gain the Republican nomination.

At the 1864 convention, pro-Lincoln Republicans adopted the new party name which also could accommodate their allies. The convention dropped then-Vice President Radical Republican Hannibal Hamlin from the ticket, and chose War Democrat Andrew Johnson as Lincoln's running mate. The National Unionists hoped that the new party and the Lincoln–Johnson ticket would emphasize the unionist purpose of the war while downplaying Republican partisanship and the slavery issue.

One notable speech was made by Rev. Robert J. Breckinridge of Kentucky, uncle of former Vice President and Confederate general John C. Breckinridge.

== Party platform ==
The convention adopted a Platform of 11 resolutions. Several resolutions were notable as they specified that the cause of the Civil War was slavery, called for slavery's eradication from the union, the complete destruction of the Confederacy, and open military enlistment of freed slaves, adopted the Emancipation Proclamation, and supported an increase in foreign immigration and asylum as just policy.

1. Resolved, That it is the highest duty of every American citizen to maintain against all their enemies the integrity of the Union and the paramount authority of the Constitution and laws of the United States; and that, laying aside all differences of political opinion, we pledge ourselves, as Union men, animated by a common sentiment and aiming at a common object, to do everything in our power to aid the Government in quelling by force of arms the Rebellion now raging against its authority, and in bringing to the punishment due to their crimes the Rebels and traitors arrayed against it.

2. Resolved, That we approve the determination of the Government of the United States not to compromise with Rebels, or to offer them any terms of peace, except such as may be based upon an unconditional surrender of their hostility and a return to their just allegiance to the Constitution and laws of the United States, and that we call upon the Government to maintain this position, and to prosecute the war with the utmost possible vigor to the complete suppression of the Rebellion, in full reliance upon the self-sacrificing patriotism, the heroic valor and the undying devotion of the American people to their country and its free institutions.

3. Resolved, That as Slavery was the cause, and now constitutes the strength, of this Rebellion, and as it must be, always and everywhere, hostile to the principles of Republican Government, justice and the National safety demand its utter and complete extirpation from the soil of the Republic : — and that, while we uphold and maintain the acts and proclamations by which the Government, in its own defence, has aimed a death-blow at this gigantic evil, we are in favor, furthermore, of such an amendment to the Constitution, to be made by the people in conformity with its provisions, as shall terminate and forever prohibit the existence of Slavery within the limits or the jurisdiction of the United States.

4. Resolved, That the thanks of the American people are due to the soldiers and sailors of the Army and Navy, who have periled their lives in defence of their country and in vindication of the honor of its flag; that the nation owes to them some permanent recognition of their patriotism and their valor, and ample and permanent provision for those of their survivors who have received disabling and honorable wounds in the service of the country; and that the memories of those who have fallen in its defence shall be held in grateful and everlasting remembrance.

5. Resolved, That we approve and applaud the practical wisdom, the unselfish patriotism and the unswerving fidelity to the Constitution and the principles of American liberty, with which Abraham Lincoln has discharged, under circumstances of unparalleled difficulty, the great duties and responsibilities of the Presidential office; that we approve and endorse, as demanded by the emergency and essential to the preservation of the nation and as within the provisions of the Constitution, the measures and acts which he has adopted to defend the nation against its open and secret foes: that we approve, especially, the Proclamation of Emancipation, and the employment as Union soldiers of men heretofore held in slavery; and that we have full confidence in his determination to carry these and all other Constitutional measures, essential to the salvation of the country into full and complete effect.

6. Resolved, That we deem it essential to the general welfare that harmony should prevail in the National Councils, and we regard as worthy of public confidence and official trust those only who cordially endorse the principles proclaimed in these resolutions, and which should characterize the administration of the Government.

7. Resolved, That the Government owes to all men employed in its armies, without regard to distinction of color, the full protection of the laws of war — and that any violation of these laws, or of the usages of civilized nations in time of war, by the Rebels now in arms, should be made the subject of prompt and full redress.

8. Resolved, That foreign immigration, which in the past has added so much to the wealth, development of resources and increase of power to this nation, the asylum of the oppressed of all nations, should be fostered and encouraged by a liberal and just policy.

9. Resolved. That we are in favor of the speedy construction of the Railroad to the Pacific coast.

10. Resolved, That the National faith, pledged for the redemption of the public debt, must be kept inviolate, and that for this purpose we recommend economy and rigid responsibility in the public expenditures, and a vigorous and just system of taxation; and that it is the duty of every loyal State to sustain the credit and promote the use of the National currency.

11. Resolved, That we approve the position taken by the Government that the people of the United States can never regard with indifference the attempt of any European Power to overthrow by force or to supplant by fraud the institutions of any Republican Government on the Western Continent — and that they will view with extreme jealousy, as menacing to the peace and independence of their own country, the efforts of any such power to obtain new footholds for Monarchial Governments, sustained by foreign military force, in near proximity to the United States.

== Presidential nomination ==
=== Presidential candidates ===
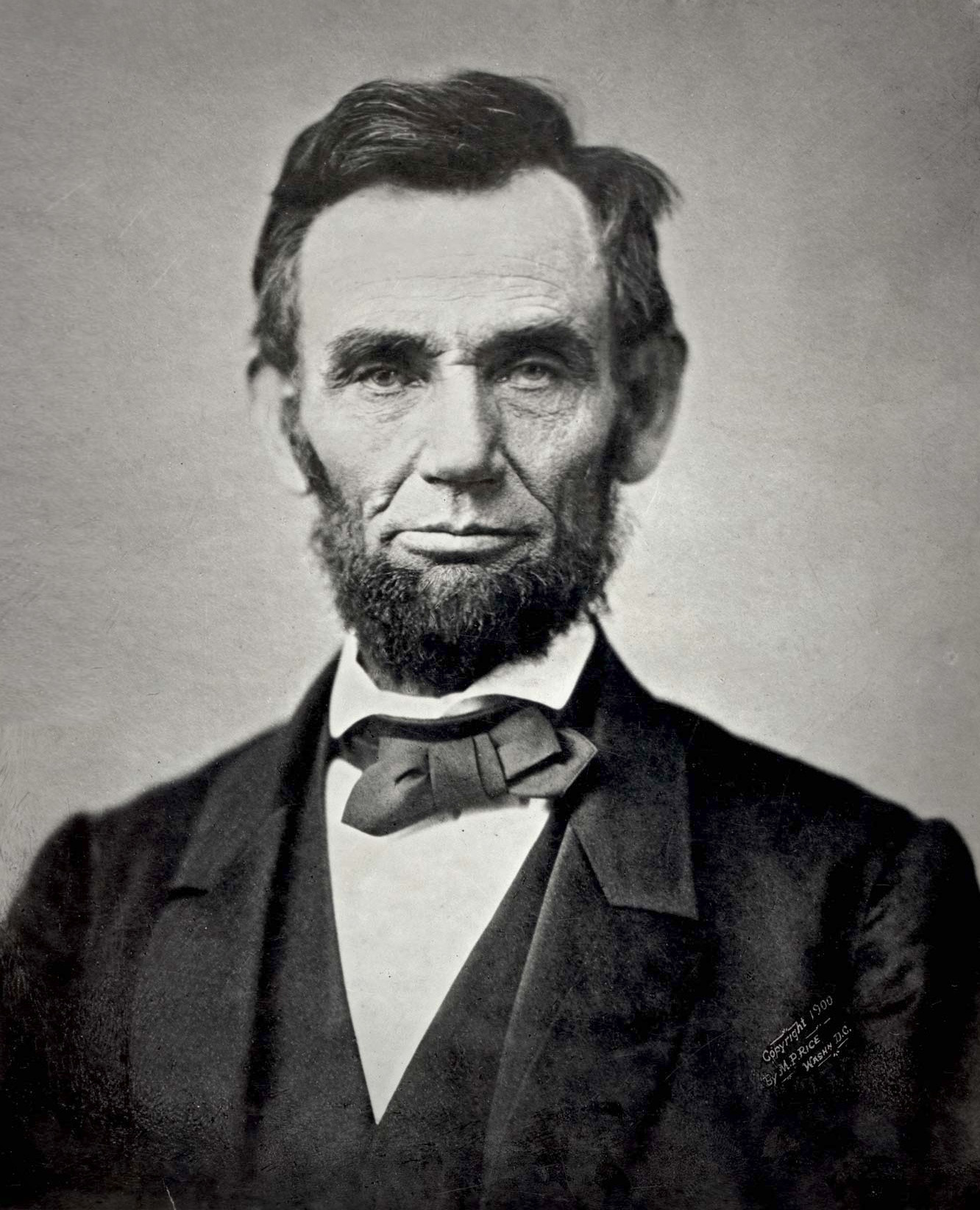
President
Abraham Lincoln
of Illinois

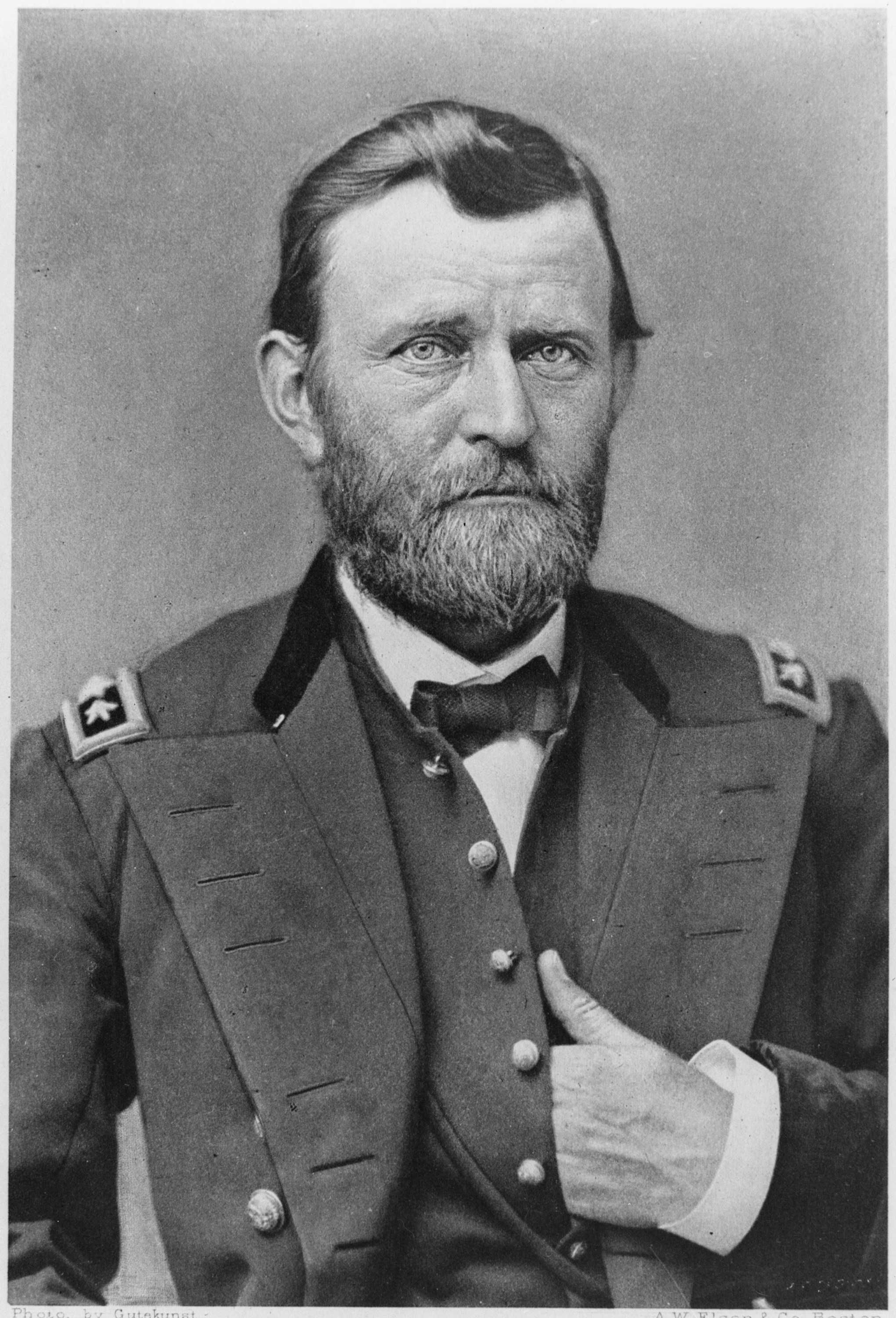
Commanding General
Ulysses S. Grant
of Illinois
(No Political Intentions)

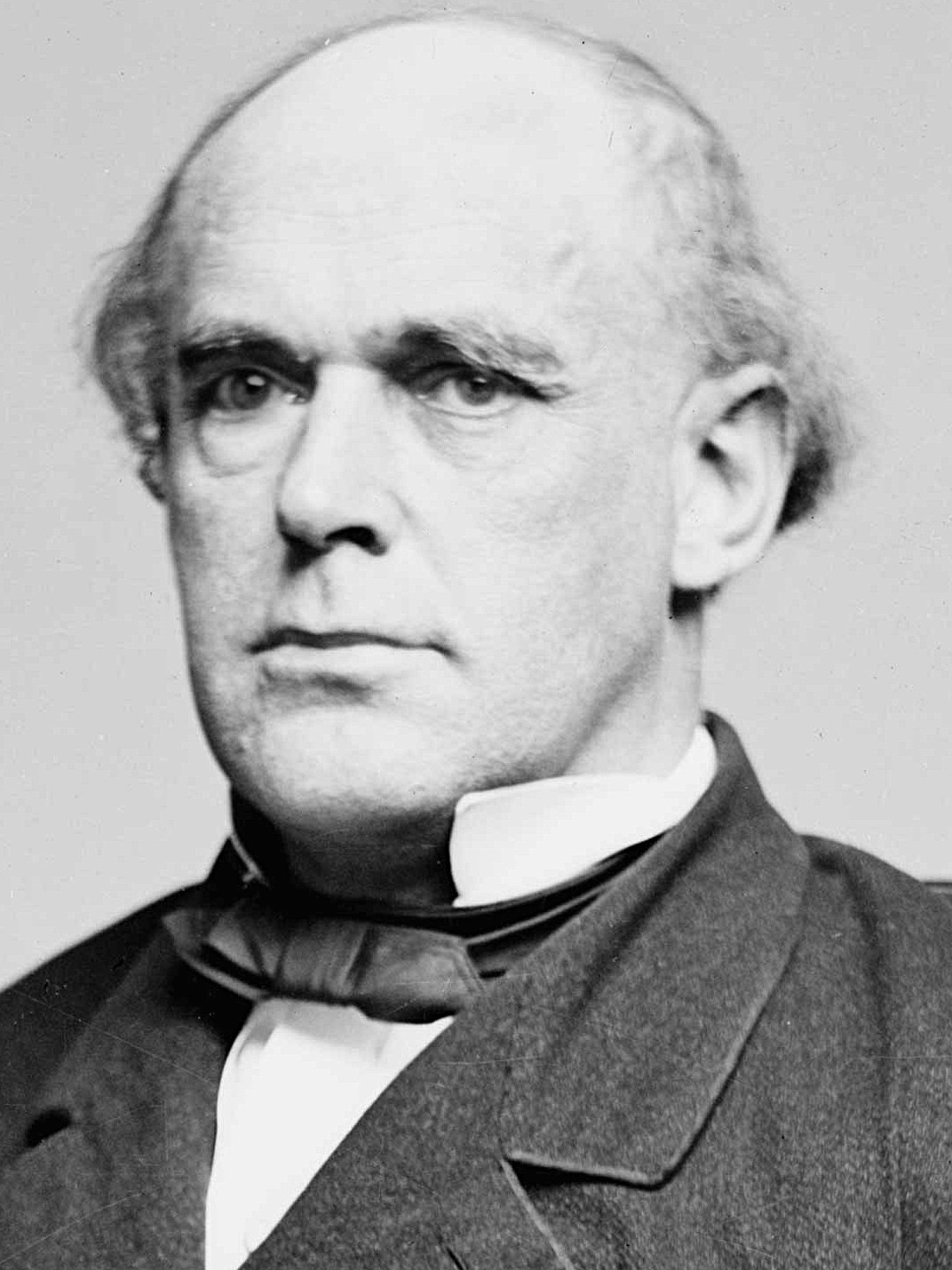
Treasury Secretary
Salmon P. Chase
of Ohio
(Declined Consideration)

On the first ballot, Missouri delegates cast their 22 votes for General Ulysses S. Grant. The Missourians quickly changed their votes to make Lincoln's renomination unanimous.

Presidential Ballot
	1st (Before Shifts)	1st (After Shifts)
Lincoln	494	516
Grant	22	0
Not Voting	3	3

Presidential Balloting / 2nd Day of Convention (June 8, 1864)

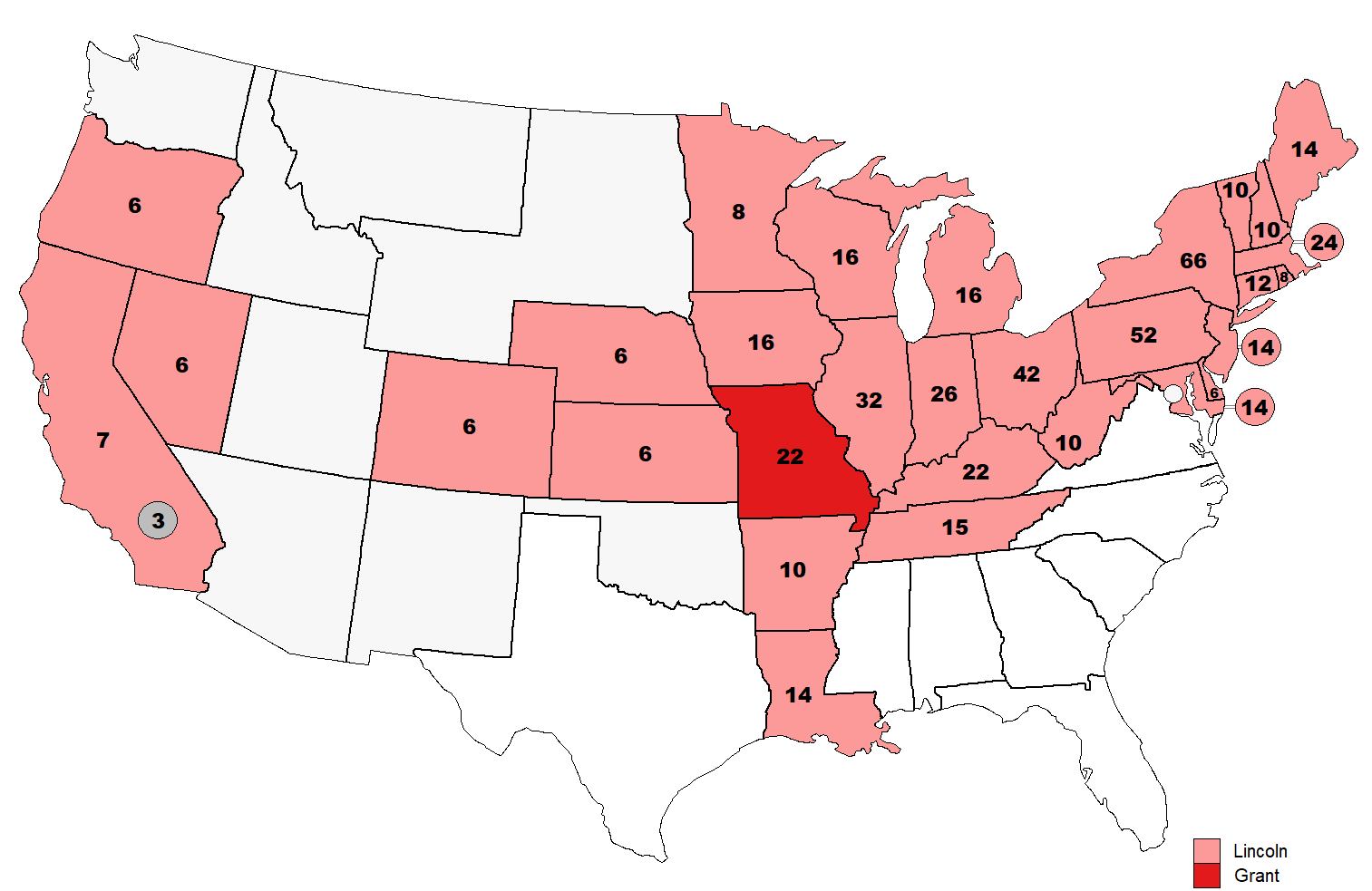
1st Presidential Ballot
(Before Shifts)

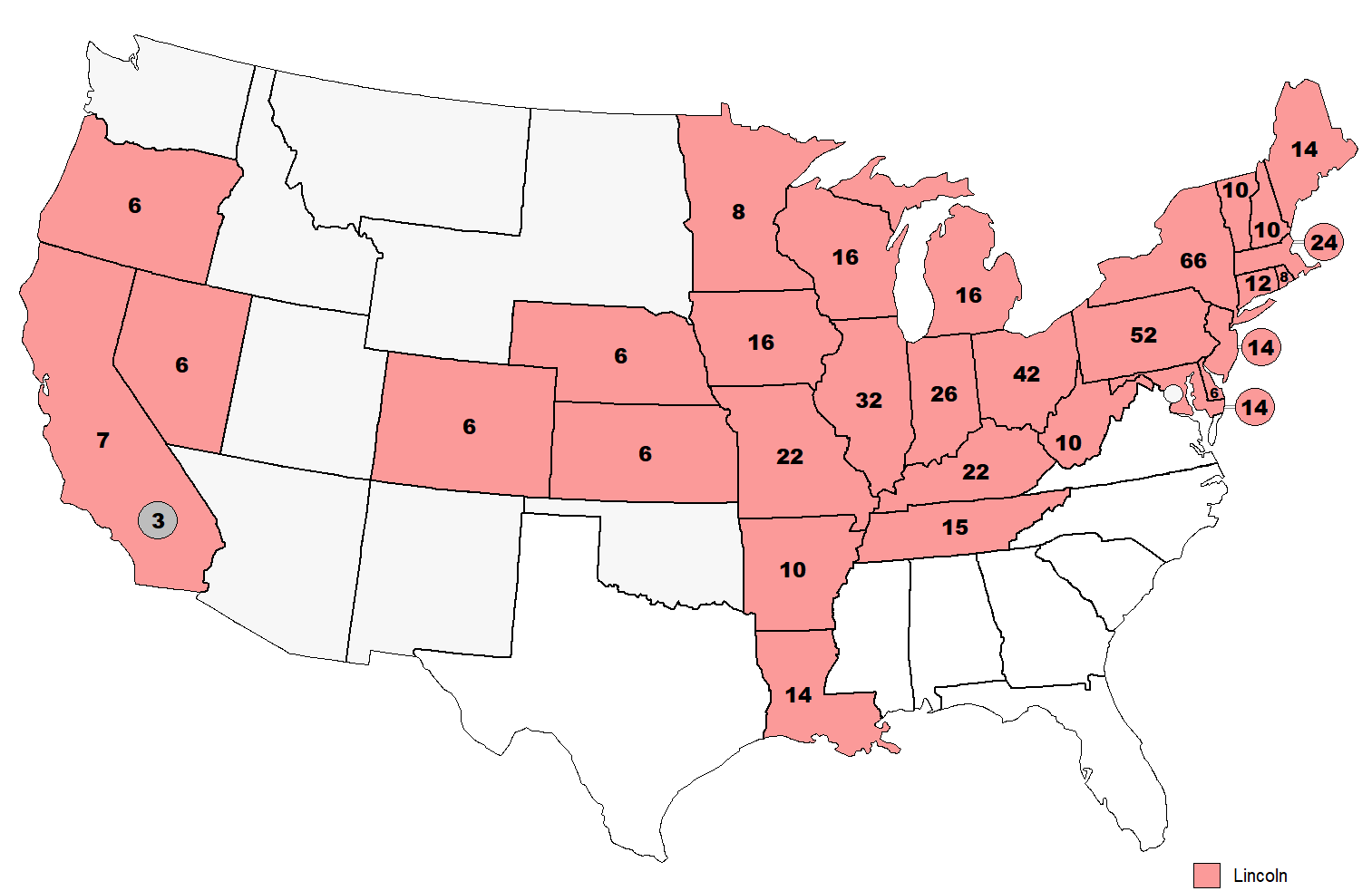
1st Presidential Ballot
(After Shifts)

== Vice Presidential nomination ==
=== Vice Presidential candidates ===
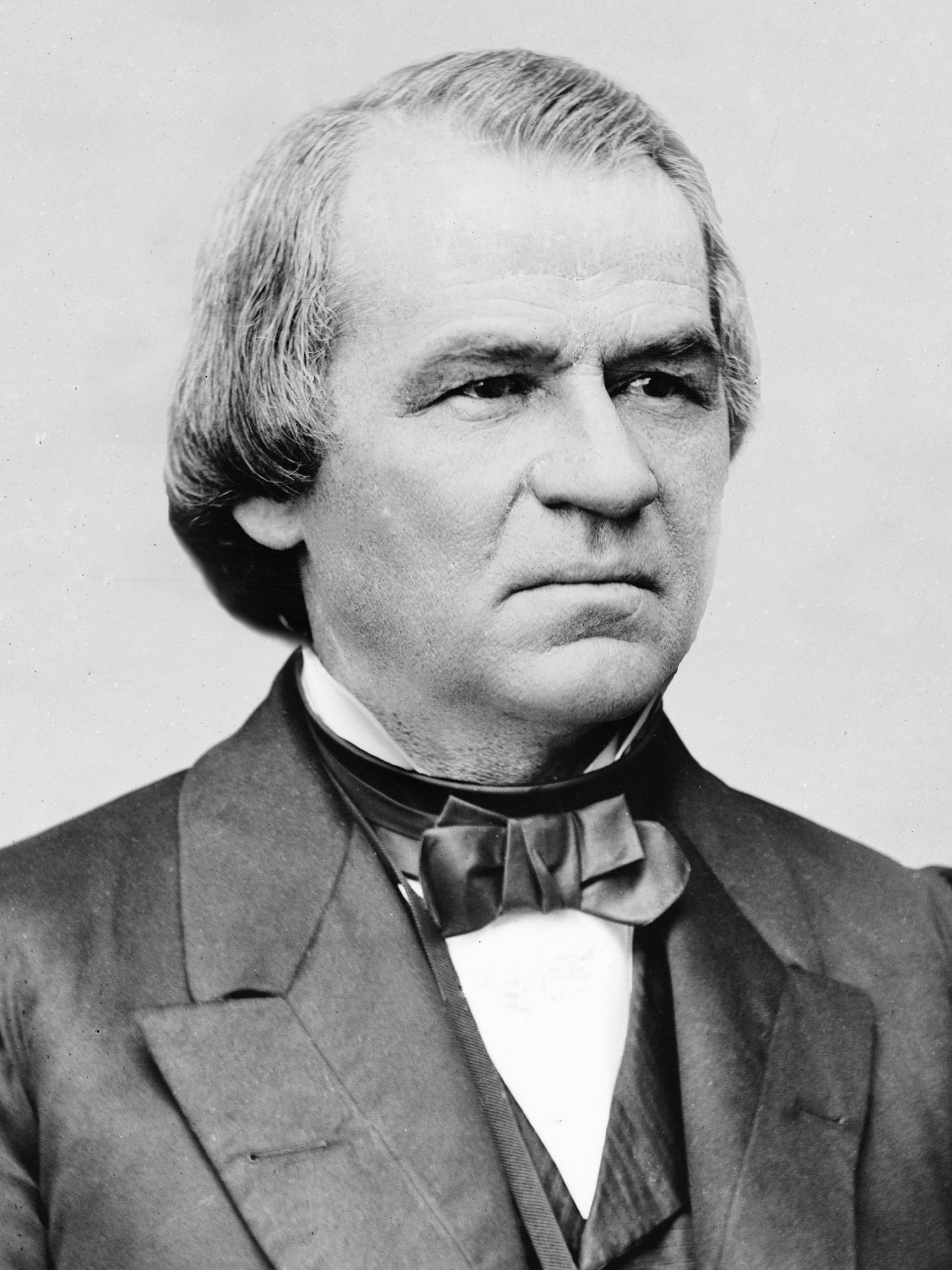
Military Governor
Andrew Johnson
of Tennessee

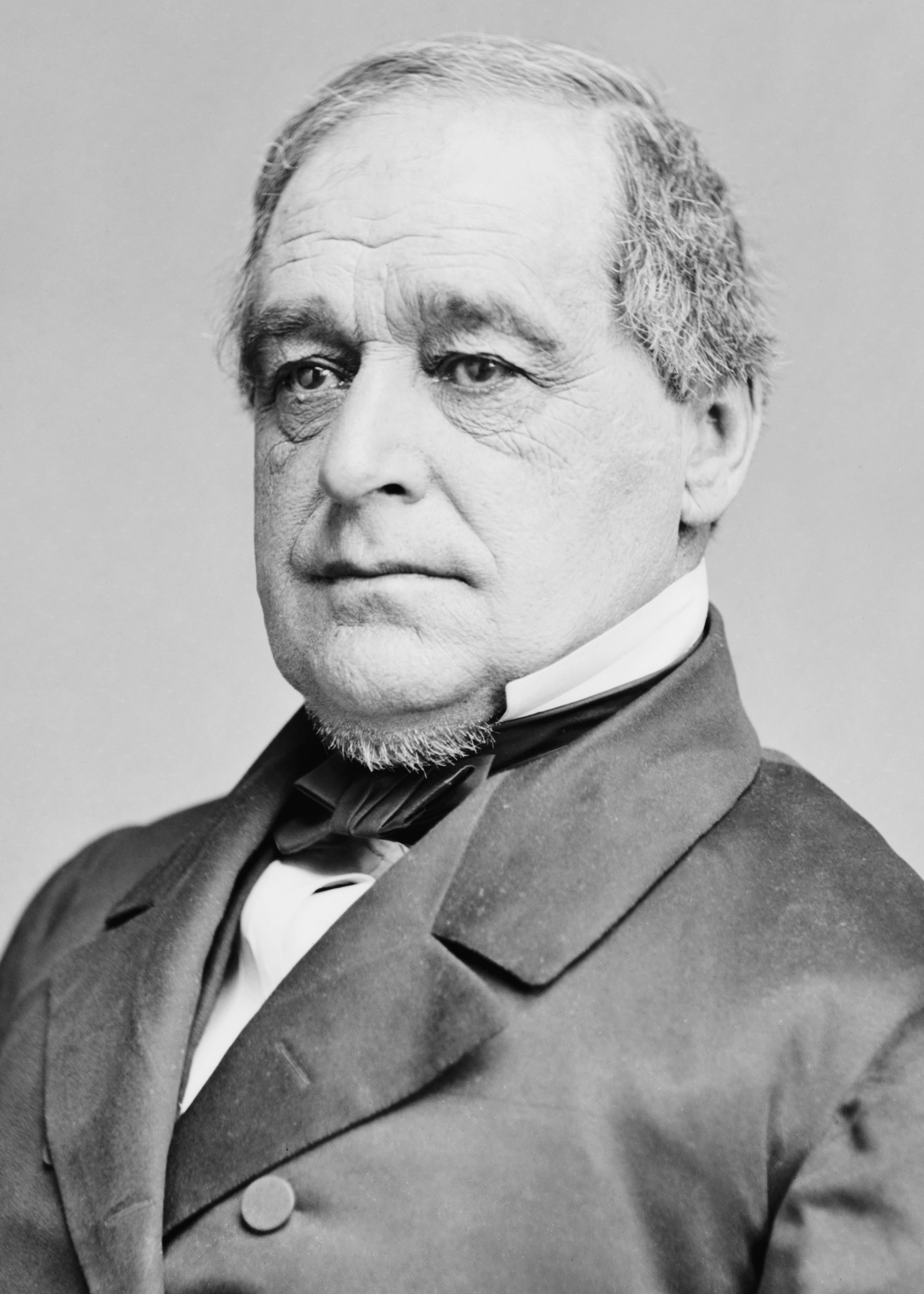
Vice President
Hannibal Hamlin
of Maine

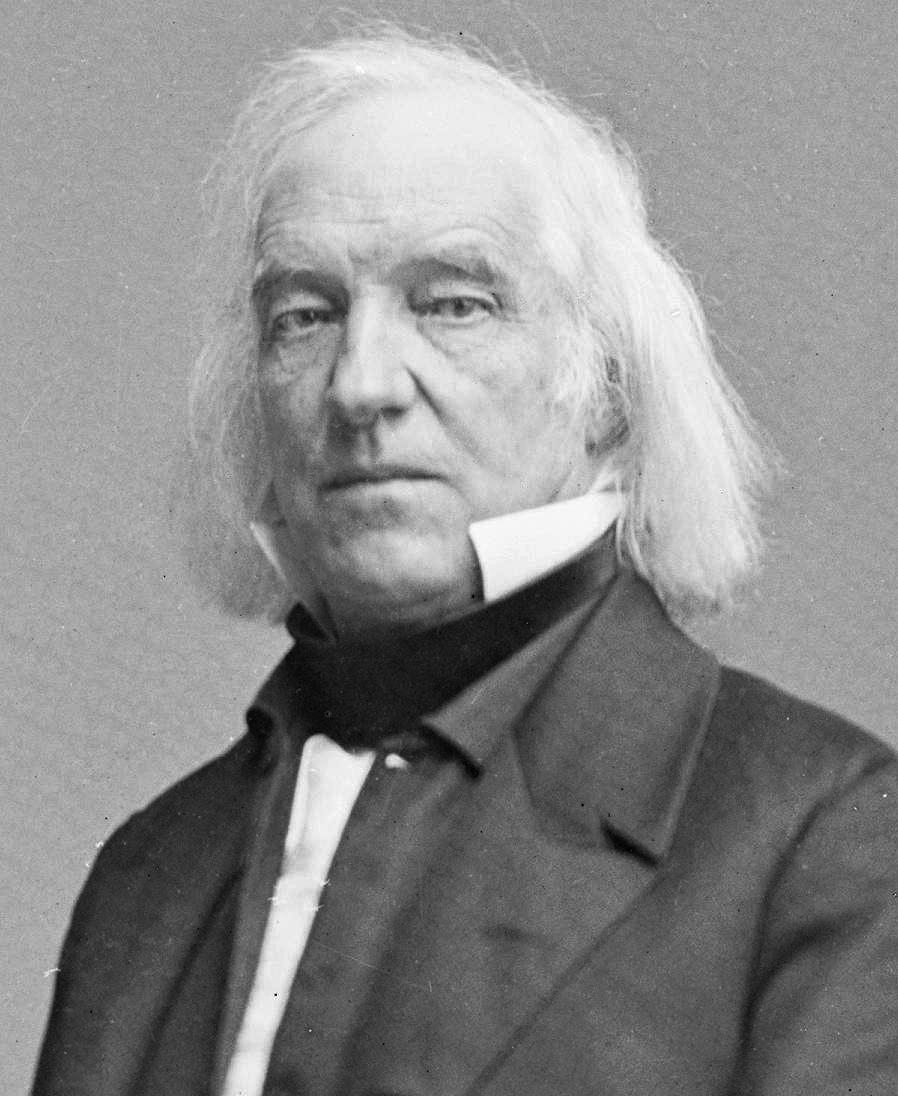
Former Senator
Daniel Dickinson
of New York

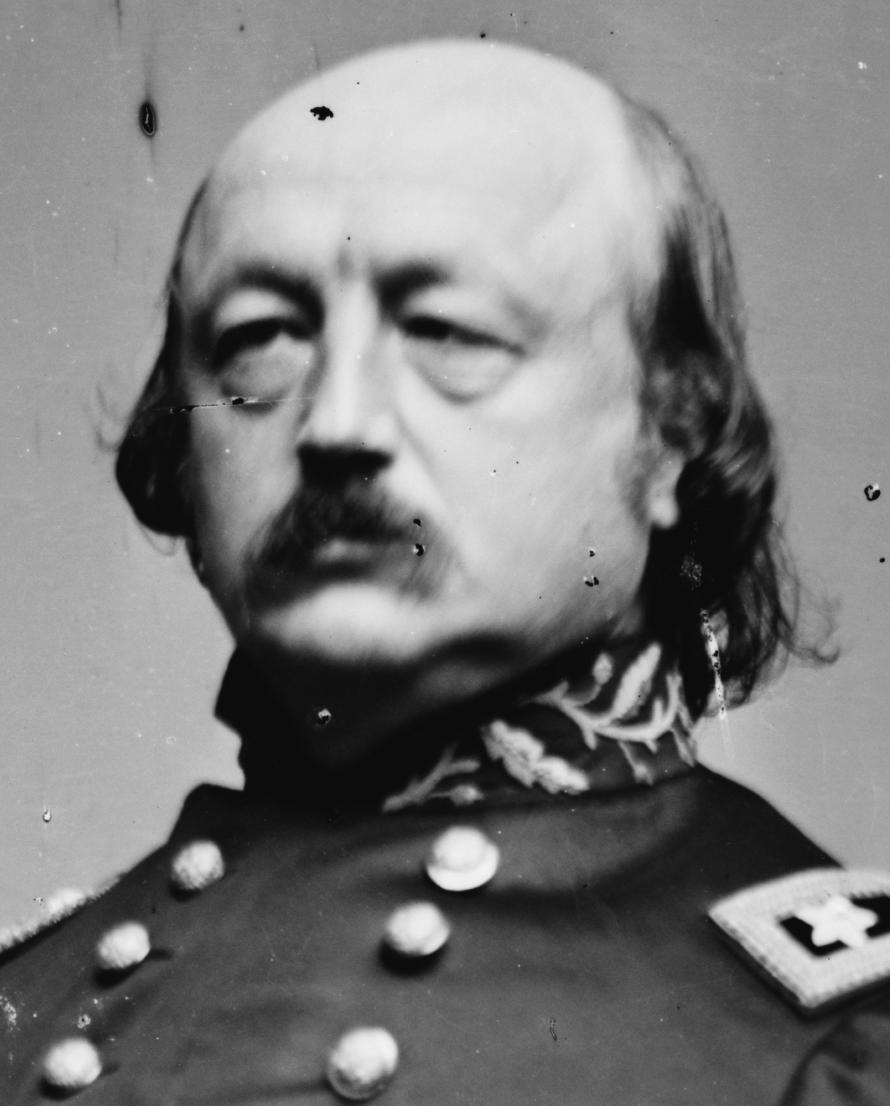
Major General
Benjamin Butler
of Massachusetts
(Not Nominated)

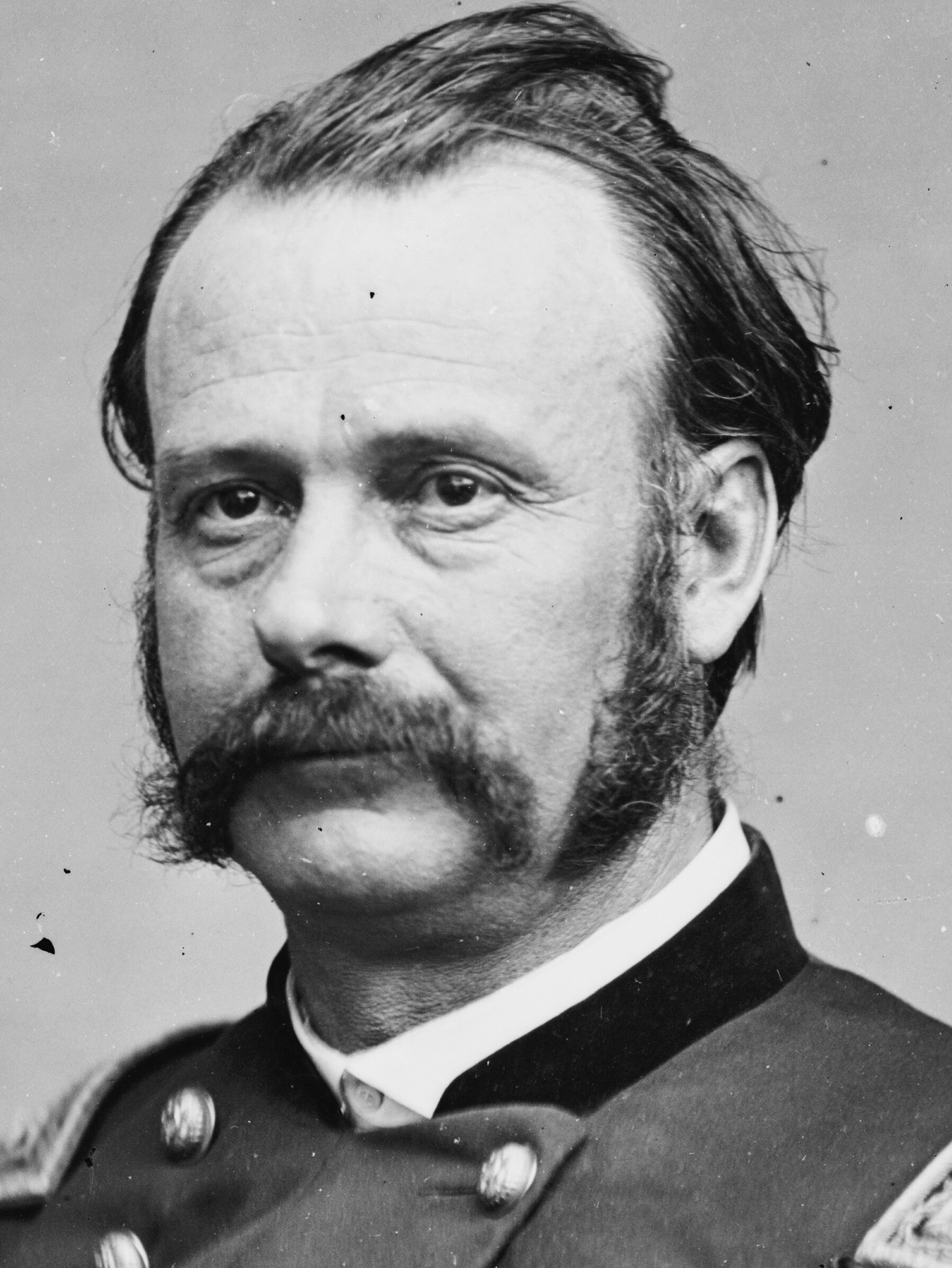
Major General
Lovell Rousseau
of Kentucky

Though Hamlin was willing to serve another term as vice president, he privately made it known that he was willing to step aside if a candidate who would be a greater electoral asset to Lincoln could be found. The convention therefore nominated Andrew Johnson, the military governor of Tennessee. Lincoln had refused to weigh in on his preferred running mate, and the convention chose to nominate Johnson, a Southern War Democrat, in order to boost the party's appeal to Unionists of both parties.

Vice Presidential Ballot
	1st (Before Shifts)	1st (After Shifts)
Johnson	200	492
Hamlin	150	9
Dickinson	108	17
Butler	28	0
Rousseau	21	0
Colfax	6	0
Burnside	2	0
Holt	2	0
King	1	0
Tod	1	1

Vice Presidential Balloting / 2nd Day of Convention (June 8, 1864)

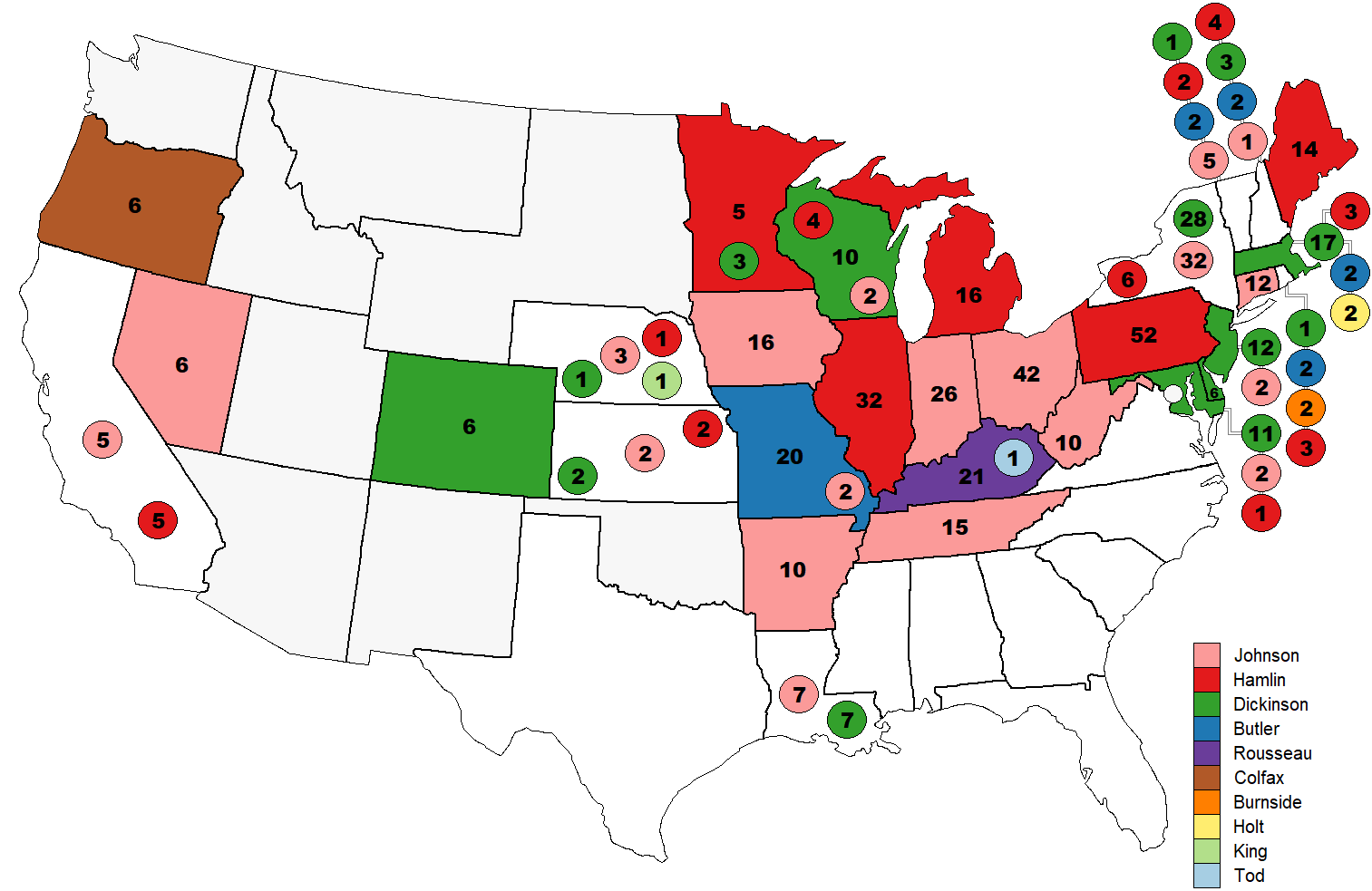
1st
Vice Presidential Ballot
(Before Shifts)

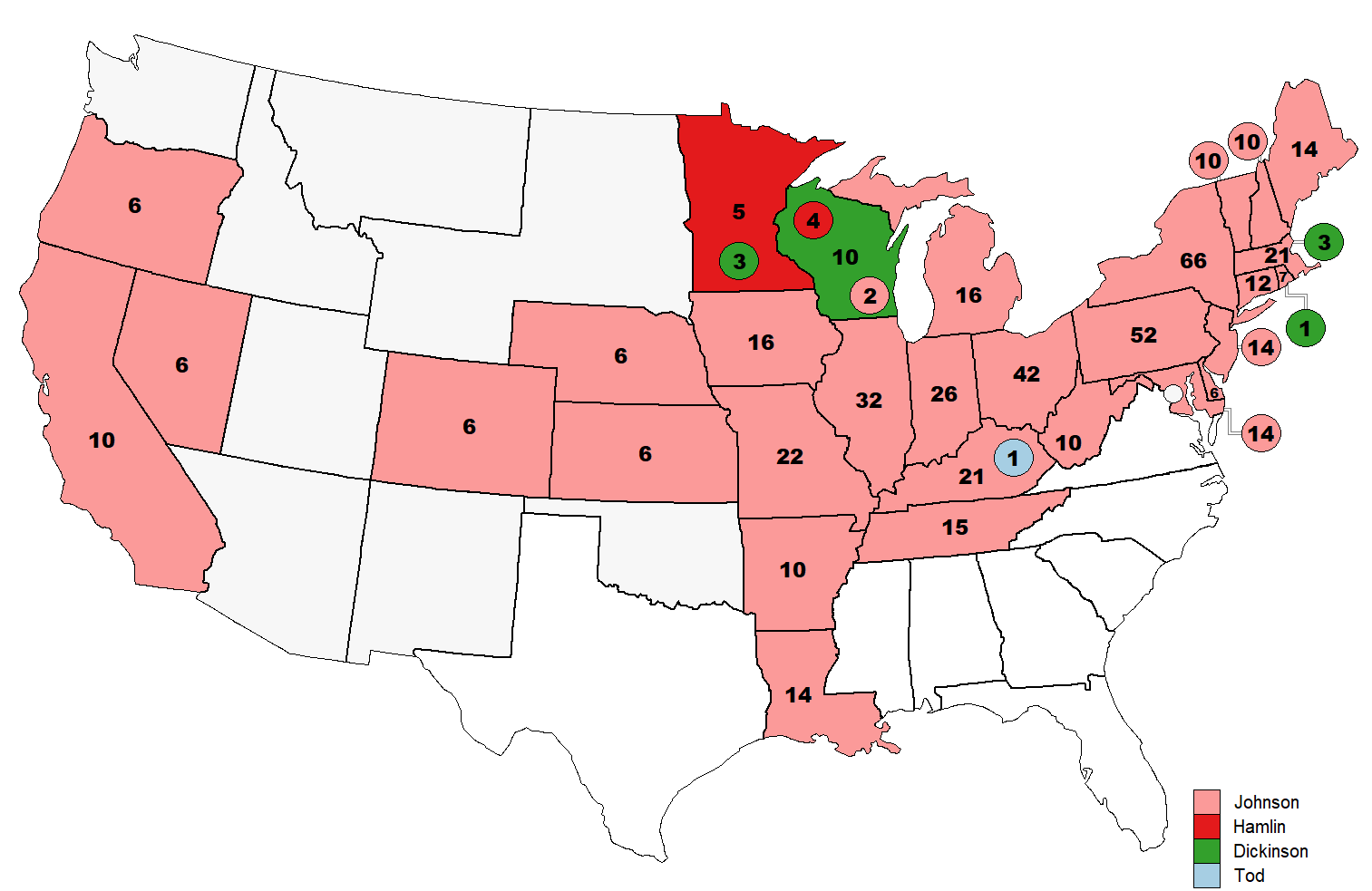
1st
Vice Presidential Ballot
(After Shifts)

== Lincoln's acceptance ==
In keeping with the tradition of the time, Lincoln did not attend the convention. On hearing the news of his re-nomination, he wrote on June 9, 1864:

I am very grateful for the renewed confidence which has been accorded to me, both by the convention and by the National [Union] League. I am not insensible at all to the personal compliment there is in this; yet I do not allow myself to believe that any but a small portion of it is to be appropriated as a personal compliment. The convention and the nation, I am assured, are alike animated by a higher view of the interests of the country for the present and the great future, and that part I am entitled to appropriate as a compliment is only that part which I may lay hold of as being the opinion of the convention and of the League, that I am not entirely unworthy to be instructed with the place I have occupied for the last three years. I have not permitted myself, gentlemen, to conclude that I am the best man in the country; but I am reminded, in this connection, of a story of an old Dutch farmer, who remarked to a companion once that "it was not best to swap horses when crossing streams."

== See also ==
- 1864 Democratic National Convention
- 1866 National Union Convention
- History of the United States Republican Party
- List of Republican National Conventions
- 1864 United States presidential election
- United States presidential nominating convention

Preceded by 1860; Chicago	Republican National Conventions	Succeeded by 1868; Chicago
