= Elections in Tennessee =

Elections in Tennessee are held to fill various local, state, and federal seats. Special elections may be held to fill vacancies at other points in time. Statewide legislative referrals and referendums may also be on the ballot in some elections. Tennessee is one of thirteen states that holds its presidential primaries on Super Tuesday.

Tennessee does not require voters to declare a party affiliation when registering. The state is one of eight states that require voters to present a form of photo identification. In a 2020 study, Tennessee was ranked as the 5th hardest state for citizens to vote in.

Between the end of the Civil War and the mid-20th century, Tennessee was part of the Democratic Solid South, but had the largest Republican minority of any former Confederate state. During this time, East Tennessee was heavily Republican and the western two thirds mostly voted Democratic, with the latter dominating the state. This division was related to the state's pattern of Unionist and Confederate loyalism during the Civil War.

Tennessee's politics are currently dominated by the Republican Party. Republicans currently hold both of the state's U.S. Senate seats, a majority of congressional seats, and the state legislature. Democratic strength is largely concentrated in Nashville, Memphis, and parts of Knoxville, Chattanooga, and Clarksville. Some suburban areas of Nashville and Memphis also contain significant Democratic minorities.

== Presidential ==
List of presidential elections in Tennessee from 1824–present.

United States presidential election results for Tennessee
Year	Republican / Whig		Democratic		Third party(ies)	
Year	No.	%	No.	%	No.	%
1824	216	1.04%	20,197	97.45%	312	1.51%
1828	2,240	4.81%	44,293	95.19%	0	0.00%
1832	1,347	4.58%	28,078	95.42%	0	0.00%
1836	36,027	57.92%	26,170	42.08%	0	0.00%
1840	60,194	55.66%	47,951	44.34%	0	0.00%
1844	60,040	50.05%	59,917	49.95%	0	0.00%
1848	64,321	52.52%	58,142	47.48%	0	0.00%
1852	58,586	50.73%	56,900	49.27%	0	0.00%
1856	0	0.00%	69,704	52.18%	63,878	47.82%
1860	0	0.00%	11,281	7.72%	134,825	92.28%
1864	30,000	85.71%	5,000	14.29%	0	0.00%
1868	56,628	68.43%	26,129	31.57%	0	0.00%
1872	85,655	47.84%	93,391	52.16%	0	0.00%
1876	89,566	40.21%	133,177	59.79%	0	0.00%
1880	107,677	44.26%	129,569	53.26%	6,017	2.47%
1884	124,101	47.74%	133,770	51.45%	2,107	0.81%
1888	138,978	45.76%	158,699	52.26%	6,017	1.98%
1892	100,537	37.83%	136,468	51.36%	28,727	10.81%
1896	148,683	46.33%	167,168	52.09%	5,052	1.57%
1900	123,108	44.95%	145,240	53.03%	5,512	2.01%
1904	105,363	43.40%	131,653	54.23%	5,734	2.36%
1908	117,977	45.87%	135,608	52.73%	3,595	1.40%
1912	60,475	24.00%	133,021	52.80%	58,437	23.20%
1916	116,223	42.70%	153,280	56.31%	2,687	0.99%
1920	219,829	51.29%	206,558	48.19%	2,239	0.52%
1924	130,728	43.54%	158,682	52.86%	10,810	3.60%
1928	195,388	53.76%	167,343	46.04%	742	0.20%
1932	126,752	32.48%	259,473	66.49%	4,031	1.03%
1936	146,520	30.81%	327,083	68.78%	1,935	0.41%
1940	169,153	32.35%	351,601	67.25%	2,069	0.40%
1944	200,311	39.22%	308,707	60.45%	1,674	0.33%
1948	202,914	36.87%	270,402	49.14%	76,967	13.99%
1952	446,147	49.99%	443,710	49.71%	2,696	0.30%
1956	462,288	49.21%	456,507	48.60%	20,609	2.19%
1960	556,577	52.92%	481,453	45.77%	13,762	1.31%
1964	508,965	44.49%	634,947	55.50%	34	0.00%
1968	472,592	37.85%	351,233	28.13%	424,792	34.02%
1972	813,147	67.70%	357,293	29.75%	30,742	2.56%
1976	633,969	42.94%	825,879	55.94%	16,498	1.12%
1980	787,761	48.70%	783,051	48.41%	46,804	2.89%
1984	990,212	57.84%	711,714	41.57%	10,067	0.59%
1988	947,233	57.89%	679,794	41.55%	9,223	0.56%
1992	841,300	42.43%	933,521	47.08%	207,817	10.48%
1996	863,530	45.59%	909,146	48.00%	121,429	6.41%
2000	1,061,949	51.15%	981,720	47.28%	32,512	1.57%
2004	1,383,336	56.81%	1,035,160	42.51%	16,453	0.68%
2008	1,479,178	56.85%	1,087,437	41.79%	35,367	1.36%
2012	1,462,330	59.42%	960,709	39.04%	37,865	1.54%
2016	1,522,925	60.72%	870,695	34.72%	114,407	4.56%
2020	1,852,475	60.66%	1,143,711	37.45%	57,665	1.89%
2024	1,966,865	64.19%	1,056,265	34.47%	40,812	1.33%

=== Presidential primaries ===
==== Republican primary ====
- 2000 Tennessee Republican presidential primary
- 2004 Tennessee Republican presidential primary
- 2008 Tennessee Republican presidential primary
- 2012 Tennessee Republican presidential primary
- 2016 Tennessee Republican presidential primary
- 2020 Tennessee Republican presidential primary
- 2024 Tennessee Republican presidential primary

==== Democratic primary ====
- 2000 Tennessee Democratic presidential primary
- 2004 Tennessee Democratic presidential primary
- 2008 Tennessee Democratic presidential primary
- 2012 Tennessee Democratic presidential primary
- 2016 Tennessee Democratic presidential primary
- 2020 Tennessee Democratic presidential primary
- 2024 Tennessee Democratic presidential primary

== National legislative ==
List of national legislative elections in Tennessee from 2000–present.

=== Senate elections ===
- 2000 United States Senate election in Tennessee
- 2002 United States Senate election in Tennessee
- 2006 United States Senate election in Tennessee
- 2008 United States Senate election in Tennessee
- 2012 United States Senate election in Tennessee
- 2014 United States Senate election in Tennessee
- 2018 United States Senate election in Tennessee
- 2020 United States Senate election in Tennessee
- 2024 United States Senate election in Tennessee
- 2026 United States Senate election in Tennessee

=== House of Representatives elections ===
- 2000 United States House of Representatives elections in Tennessee
- 2002 United States House of Representatives elections in Tennessee
- 2004 United States House of Representatives elections in Tennessee
- 2006 United States House of Representatives elections in Tennessee
- 2008 United States House of Representatives elections in Tennessee
- 2010 United States House of Representatives elections in Tennessee
- 2012 United States House of Representatives elections in Tennessee
- 2014 United States House of Representatives elections in Tennessee
- 2016 United States House of Representatives elections in Tennessee
- 2018 United States House of Representatives elections in Tennessee
- 2020 United States House of Representatives elections in Tennessee
- 2022 United States House of Representatives elections in Tennessee
- 2024 United States House of Representatives elections in Tennessee
- 2025 Tennessee's 7th congressional district special election
- 2026 Tennessee House of Representatives election

== Gubernatorial ==
List of gubernatorial elections in Tennessee from 2002–present.

- 2002 Tennessee gubernatorial election
- 2006 Tennessee gubernatorial election
- 2010 Tennessee gubernatorial election
- 2014 Tennessee gubernatorial election
- 2018 Tennessee gubernatorial election
- 2022 Tennessee gubernatorial election
- 2026 Tennessee gubernatorial election

== State legislative ==
=== State Senate elections ===
- 2002 Tennessee Senate election
- 2004 Tennessee Senate election
- 2006 Tennessee Senate election
- 2008 Tennessee Senate election
- 2010 Tennessee Senate election
- 2012 Tennessee Senate election
- 2014 Tennessee Senate election
- 2016 Tennessee Senate election
- 2018 Tennessee Senate election
- 2020 Tennessee Senate election
- 2022 Tennessee Senate election
- 2024 Tennessee Senate election
- 2026 Tennessee Senate election

=== State House elections ===
- 2006 Tennessee House of Representatives election
- 2008 Tennessee House of Representatives election
- 2010 Tennessee House of Representatives election
- 2012 Tennessee House of Representatives election
- 2014 Tennessee House of Representatives election
- 2016 Tennessee House of Representatives election
- 2018 Tennessee House of Representatives election
- 2020 Tennessee House of Representatives election
- 2022 Tennessee House of Representatives election
- 2024 Tennessee House of Representatives election
- 2026 Tennessee House of Representatives election

== Ballot propositions ==
- 1978 Tennessee Proposal 1
- 2006 Tennessee Marriage Protection Amendment
- 2014 Tennessee Amendment 1
- 2022 Tennessee Amendment 1
- 2022 Tennessee Amendment 3

== Local elections ==
=== Tennessee County elections ===
- 2026 Tennessee county mayoral elections

=== Davidson County elections ===
Nashville mayoral elections

- 2007 Nashville mayoral election
- 2011 Nashville mayoral election
- 2015 Nashville mayoral election
- 2018 Nashville mayoral special election
- 2019 Nashville mayoral election
- 2023 Nashville mayoral election

Nashville measures

- Nashville Charter Amendment 1
- Let's Move Nashville

=== Hamilton County elections ===
Countywide elections

- 2018 Hamilton County, Tennessee, mayoral election
- 2022 Hamilton County, Tennessee, mayoral election
- 2026 Hamilton County, Tennessee, mayoral election

Chattanooga elections

- 2005 Chattanooga mayoral election
- 2009 Chattanooga mayoral election
- 2013 Chattanooga mayoral election
- 2017 Chattanooga mayoral election
- 2021 Chattanooga mayoral election
- 2025 Chattanooga mayoral election

=== Knox County elections ===
Countywide elections

- 2010 Knox County, Tennessee, mayoral election
- 2014 Knox County, Tennessee, mayoral election
- 2018 Knox County, Tennessee, mayoral election
- 2022 Knox County, Tennessee, mayoral election
- 2026 Knox County, Tennessee, mayoral election

Knoxville elections

- 2003 Knoxville mayoral election
- 2007 Knoxville mayoral election
- 2011 Knoxville mayoral election
- 2015 Knoxville mayoral election
- 2019 Knoxville mayoral election
- 2023 Knoxville mayoral election

=== Montgomery County elections ===
- 2006 Clarksville mayoral election
- 2010 Clarksville mayoral election
- 2014 Clarksville mayoral election
- 2018 Clarksville mayoral election
- 2022 Clarksville mayoral election
- 2026 Clarksville mayoral election

=== Madison County elections ===
- 2015 Jackson, Tennessee mayoral election
- 2019 Jackson, Tennessee mayoral election
- 2023 Jackson, Tennessee mayoral election

=== Rutherford County elections ===
- 2014 Murfreesboro mayoral election
- 2018 Murfreesboro mayoral election
- 2022 Murfreesboro mayoral election
- 2026 Murfreesboro mayoral election

=== Shelby County elections ===
==== Countywide elections ====
- 2010 Shelby County, Tennessee, mayoral election
- 2014 Shelby County, Tennessee, mayoral election
- 2018 Shelby County, Tennessee, mayoral election
- 2022 Shelby County, Tennessee, mayoral election
- 2026 Shelby County, Tennessee, mayoral election

==== Memphis elections ====
- 2011 Memphis mayoral election
- 2015 Memphis mayoral election
- 2019 Memphis mayoral election
- 2023 Memphis mayoral election

== Elections by year ==
- 2000 Tennessee elections
- 2002 Tennessee elections
- 2004 Tennessee elections
- 2006 Tennessee elections
- 2008 Tennessee elections
- 2010 Tennessee elections
- 2012 Tennessee elections
- 2014 Tennessee elections
- 2016 Tennessee elections
- 2018 Tennessee elections
- 2019 Tennessee elections
- 2020 Tennessee elections
- 2022 Tennessee elections
- 2024 Tennessee elections
- 2026 Tennessee elections

== See also ==
- Political party strength in Tennessee
- United States presidential elections in Tennessee
- Politics in Tennessee
- List of United States senators from Tennessee
- List of United States representatives from Tennessee
- Tennessee Senate
- Tennessee House of Representatives
