= 1980 United States presidential election in Tennessee =

- November 4, 1980

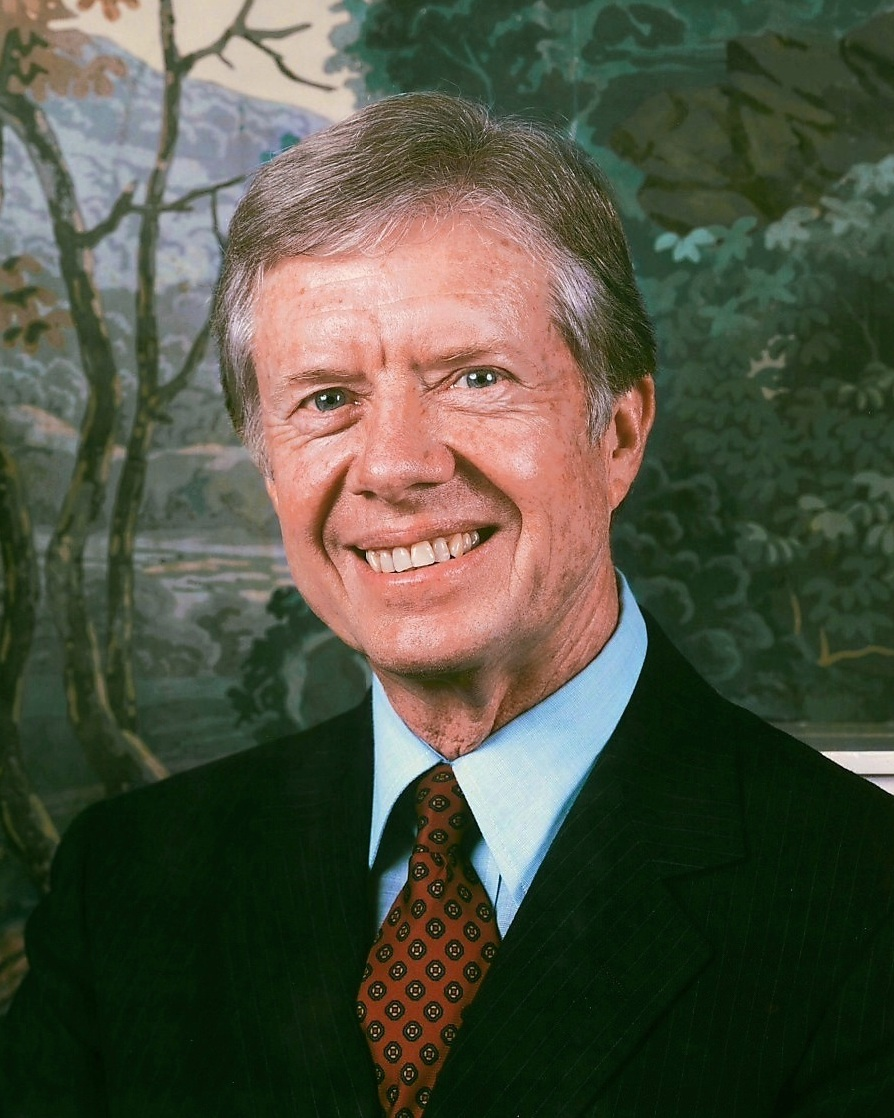
Nominee	Ronald Reagan	Jimmy Carter
Party	Republican	Democratic
Home state	California	Georgia
Running mate	George H. W. Bush	Walter Mondale
Electoral vote	10	0
Popular vote	787,761	783,051
Percentage	48.70%	48.41%

Reagan
40–50%
50–60%
60–70%
70–80%
Carter
40–50%
50–60%
60–70%
70–80%
President before election
Jimmy Carter
Democratic
Elected President
Ronald Reagan
Republican

The 1980 United States presidential election in Tennessee took place on November 4, 1980. All 50 states and The District of Columbia were part of the 1980 United States presidential election. Tennessee voters chose 10 electors to the Electoral College, who voted for president and vice president.

Tennessee was won by former California Governor Ronald Reagan (R) by a very slim margin of 0.29% and a margin of just 4,710 votes, partly because of President Jimmy Carter's southern roots. Amidst a national Republican landslide, Tennessee weighed in as 9.5 points more Democratic than the nation at-large, and Carter's 48.41% vote share has not been exceeded by any Democrat since (Bill Clinton would go on to carry the state with smaller pluralities in 1992 and 1996). Carter's strong performance given the national environment stands as a relative anomaly in Tennessee's recent electoral history; had he carried the state, it would have marked the only time since 1924 that a Republican was elected president without winning Tennessee.

Reagan’s victory was the first of three consecutive Republican victories in the state, as Tennessee would not vote Democratic again until Bill Clinton in 1992. Since then, it has become a safe Republican state. As of the 2024 presidential election, this is the last time that Tipton County voted for a Democratic presidential candidate, and the last time that a Republican carried Tennessee with a plurality, rather than a majority.

Among white voters, 55% supported Reagan while 42% supported Carter.

== Results ==
Presidential Candidate	Running Mate	Party	Electoral Vote (EV)	Popular Vote (PV)	
Ronald Reagan	George H. W. Bush	Republican	10	787,761	48.70%
Jimmy Carter (incumbent)	Walter Mondale (incumbent)	Democratic	0	783,051	48.41%
John B. Anderson	Patrick Lucey	Independent	0	35,991	2.22%
Ed Clark	David Koch	Independent	0	7,116	0.44%
Barry Commoner	—	Independent	0	1,112	0.07%
Benjamin Bubar	Earl Dodge	Independent	0	521	0.03%
David McReynolds	Diane Drufenbrock	Independent	0	519	0.03%
Gus Hall	Angela Davis	Independent	0	503	0.03%
Clifton DeBerry	Matilde Zimmermann	Independent	0	490	0.03%
Deirdre Griswold	Larry Holmes	Independent	0	400	0.02%
—	—	Write-ins	0	152	0.01%

=== Results by county ===
County	Ronald Reagan Republican		Jimmy Carter Democratic		John B. Anderson Independent		Ed Clark Independent		Various candidates Other parties		Margin		Total votes cast
County	#	%	#	%	#	%	#	%	#	%	#	%	Total votes cast
Anderson	14,235	55.31%	10,194	39.61%	1,161	4.51%	102	0.40%	44	0.17%	4,041	15.70%	25,736
Bedford	3,377	35.24%	5,987	62.48%	159	1.66%	40	0.42%	20	0.21%	-2,610	-27.24%	9,583
Benton	2,281	36.83%	3,811	61.54%	71	1.15%	30	0.48%	0	0.00%	-1,530	-24.71%	6,193
Bledsoe	1,970	54.94%	1,585	44.20%	26	0.73%	4	0.11%	1	0.03%	385	10.74%	3,586
Blount	17,959	63.81%	9,412	33.44%	620	2.20%	110	0.39%	43	0.15%	8,547	30.37%	28,144
Bradley	11,869	59.63%	7,638	38.37%	316	1.59%	68	0.34%	14	0.07%	4,231	21.26%	19,905
Campbell	5,537	52.99%	4,752	45.47%	120	1.15%	24	0.23%	17	0.16%	785	7.52%	10,450
Cannon	1,403	36.76%	2,351	61.59%	41	1.07%	11	0.29%	11	0.29%	-948	-24.83%	3,817
Carroll	5,681	50.98%	5,277	47.36%	125	1.12%	42	0.38%	18	0.16%	404	3.62%	11,143
Carter	11,648	64.44%	6,006	33.22%	326	1.80%	70	0.39%	27	0.15%	5,642	31.22%	18,077
Cheatham	2,296	37.03%	3,771	60.81%	90	1.45%	29	0.47%	15	0.24%	-1,475	-23.78%	6,201
Chester	2,751	55.69%	2,123	42.98%	52	1.05%	9	0.18%	5	0.10%	628	12.71%	4,940
Claiborne	4,289	59.05%	2,844	39.16%	94	1.29%	30	0.41%	6	0.08%	1,445	19.89%	7,263
Clay	1,344	48.61%	1,376	49.76%	27	0.98%	15	0.54%	3	0.11%	-32	-1.15%	2,765
Cocke	6,802	74.39%	2,139	23.39%	139	1.52%	38	0.42%	26	0.28%	4,663	51.00%	9,144
Coffee	5,454	40.72%	7,612	56.84%	239	1.78%	66	0.49%	22	0.16%	-2,158	-16.12%	13,393
Crockett	2,117	46.14%	2,422	52.79%	27	0.59%	18	0.39%	4	0.09%	-305	-6.65%	4,588
Cumberland	6,354	60.89%	3,775	36.17%	227	2.18%	51	0.49%	29	0.28%	2,579	24.72%	10,436
Davidson	65,772	37.45%	103,741	59.08%	4,834	2.75%	938	0.53%	321	0.18%	-37,969	-21.63%	175,606
DeKalb	1,841	37.82%	2,948	60.56%	48	0.99%	19	0.39%	12	0.25%	-1,107	-22.74%	4,868
Decatur	2,095	48.95%	2,139	49.98%	35	0.82%	8	0.19%	3	0.07%	-44	-1.03%	4,280
Dickson	3,636	34.74%	6,622	63.27%	157	1.50%	37	0.35%	15	0.14%	-2,986	-28.53%	10,467
Dyer	5,475	48.00%	5,713	50.08%	158	1.39%	49	0.43%	12	0.11%	-238	-2.08%	11,407
Fayette	2,944	40.92%	4,141	57.55%	75	1.04%	24	0.33%	11	0.15%	-1,197	-16.63%	7,195
Fentress	2,493	60.76%	1,543	37.61%	49	1.19%	14	0.34%	4	0.10%	950	23.15%	4,103
Franklin	3,995	36.02%	6,760	60.96%	251	2.26%	59	0.53%	25	0.23%	-2,765	-24.94%	11,090
Gibson	6,792	40.13%	9,829	58.08%	227	1.34%	52	0.31%	23	0.14%	-3,037	-17.95%	16,923
Giles	2,757	36.58%	4,653	61.74%	85	1.13%	23	0.31%	19	0.25%	-1,896	-25.16%	7,537
Grainger	3,254	67.12%	1,495	30.84%	66	1.36%	24	0.50%	9	0.19%	1,759	36.28%	4,848
Greene	10,704	63.13%	5,822	34.34%	338	1.99%	64	0.38%	28	0.17%	4,882	28.79%	16,956
Grundy	1,139	28.34%	2,837	70.59%	33	0.82%	3	0.07%	7	0.17%	-1,698	-42.25%	4,019
Hamblen	9,741	60.60%	5,890	36.65%	336	2.09%	87	0.54%	19	0.12%	3,851	23.95%	16,073
Hamilton	57,575	56.40%	41,913	41.05%	2,087	2.04%	374	0.37%	143	0.14%	15,662	15.35%	102,092
Hancock	1,734	69.72%	704	28.31%	32	1.29%	10	0.40%	7	0.28%	1,030	41.41%	2,487
Hardeman	2,931	40.68%	4,153	57.64%	73	1.01%	19	0.26%	29	0.40%	-1,222	-16.96%	7,205
Hardin	4,152	55.84%	3,164	42.56%	76	1.02%	31	0.42%	12	0.16%	988	13.28%	7,435
Hawkins	7,836	57.92%	5,283	39.05%	310	2.29%	63	0.47%	37	0.27%	2,553	18.87%	13,529
Haywood	2,435	40.97%	3,445	57.97%	49	0.82%	11	0.19%	3	0.05%	-1,010	-17.00%	5,943
Henderson	5,108	64.45%	2,702	34.09%	78	0.98%	28	0.35%	10	0.13%	2,406	30.36%	7,926
Henry	4,299	38.49%	6,601	59.11%	200	1.79%	52	0.47%	16	0.14%	-2,302	-20.62%	11,168
Hickman	1,903	36.39%	3,225	61.66%	78	1.49%	17	0.33%	7	0.13%	-1,322	-25.27%	5,230
Houston	738	29.04%	1,757	69.15%	31	1.22%	6	0.24%	9	0.35%	-1,019	-40.11%	2,541
Humphreys	1,897	31.80%	3,974	66.61%	74	1.24%	18	0.30%	3	0.05%	-2,077	-34.81%	5,966
Jackson	995	28.15%	2,480	70.16%	27	0.76%	27	0.76%	6	0.17%	-1,485	-42.01%	3,535
Jefferson	6,944	66.82%	3,180	30.60%	201	1.93%	42	0.40%	25	0.24%	3,764	36.22%	10,392
Johnson	3,716	74.99%	1,141	23.03%	66	1.33%	22	0.44%	10	0.20%	2,575	51.96%	4,955
Knox	66,153	56.26%	45,634	38.81%	4,801	4.08%	570	0.48%	427	0.36%	20,519	17.45%	117,585
Lake	823	32.11%	1,718	67.03%	11	0.43%	3	0.12%	8	0.31%	-895	-34.92%	2,563
Lauderdale	2,818	38.95%	4,318	59.68%	73	1.01%	16	0.22%	10	0.14%	-1,500	-20.73%	7,235
Lawrence	6,532	48.47%	6,082	45.13%	212	1.57%	158	1.17%	493	3.66%	450	3.34%	13,477
Lewis	1,076	32.52%	2,190	66.18%	33	1.00%	5	0.15%	5	0.15%	-1,114	-33.66%	3,309
Lincoln	2,856	33.96%	5,387	64.06%	119	1.42%	34	0.40%	13	0.15%	-2,531	-30.10%	8,409
Loudon	6,382	61.51%	3,699	35.65%	235	2.26%	40	0.39%	20	0.19%	2,683	25.86%	10,376
Macon	2,925	58.96%	1,947	39.25%	65	1.31%	19	0.38%	5	0.10%	978	19.71%	4,961
Madison	13,667	50.27%	12,986	47.77%	363	1.34%	103	0.38%	68	0.25%	681	2.50%	27,187
Marion	3,902	45.10%	4,623	53.44%	93	1.08%	26	0.30%	7	0.08%	-721	-8.34%	8,651
Marshall	2,282	34.23%	4,277	64.16%	78	1.17%	24	0.36%	5	0.08%	-1,995	-29.93%	6,666
Maury	6,637	44.16%	7,957	52.94%	225	1.50%	134	0.89%	77	0.51%	-1,320	-8.78%	15,030
McMinn	7,825	57.76%	5,460	40.30%	200	1.48%	53	0.39%	9	0.07%	2,365	17.46%	13,547
McNairy	4,603	54.06%	3,801	44.64%	76	0.89%	25	0.29%	9	0.11%	802	9.42%	8,514
Meigs	1,278	55.18%	999	43.13%	31	1.34%	6	0.26%	2	0.09%	279	12.05%	2,316
Monroe	6,246	56.45%	4,612	41.68%	125	1.13%	44	0.40%	38	0.34%	1,634	14.77%	11,065
Montgomery	8,503	41.08%	11,573	55.91%	490	2.37%	85	0.41%	47	0.23%	-3,070	-14.83%	20,698
Moore	551	34.55%	993	62.26%	34	2.13%	14	0.88%	3	0.19%	-442	-27.71%	1,595
Morgan	2,823	56.29%	2,094	41.75%	70	1.40%	21	0.42%	7	0.14%	729	14.54%	5,015
Obion	5,397	47.49%	5,766	50.73%	138	1.21%	34	0.30%	30	0.26%	-369	-3.24%	11,365
Overton	1,869	35.49%	3,343	63.47%	38	0.72%	15	0.28%	2	0.04%	-1,474	-27.98%	5,267
Perry	783	35.08%	1,401	62.77%	32	1.43%	13	0.58%	3	0.13%	-618	-27.69%	2,232
Pickett	1,319	62.75%	758	36.06%	12	0.57%	5	0.24%	8	0.38%	561	26.69%	2,102
Polk	2,414	48.67%	2,470	49.80%	45	0.91%	18	0.36%	13	0.26%	-56	-1.13%	4,960
Putnam	6,235	42.26%	8,084	54.80%	342	2.32%	66	0.45%	26	0.18%	-1,849	-12.54%	14,753
Rhea	4,689	59.44%	3,070	38.91%	93	1.18%	24	0.30%	13	0.16%	1,619	20.53%	7,889
Roane	11,096	61.03%	6,473	35.60%	481	2.65%	93	0.51%	39	0.21%	4,623	25.43%	18,182
Robertson	3,560	32.00%	7,381	66.34%	127	1.14%	45	0.40%	13	0.12%	-3,821	-34.34%	11,126
Rutherford	11,208	40.98%	15,213	55.62%	703	2.57%	153	0.56%	73	0.27%	-4,005	-14.64%	27,350
Scott	3,014	62.38%	1,724	35.68%	63	1.30%	17	0.35%	14	0.29%	1,290	26.70%	4,832
Sequatchie	1,512	49.54%	1,509	49.44%	23	0.75%	6	0.20%	2	0.07%	3	0.10%	3,052
Sevier	10,576	73.25%	3,450	23.89%	338	2.34%	48	0.33%	27	0.19%	7,126	49.36%	14,439
Shelby	140,157	45.43%	159,240	51.61%	7,180	2.33%	1,362	0.44%	578	0.19%	-19,083	-6.18%	308,517
Smith	1,755	31.73%	3,674	66.43%	69	1.25%	23	0.42%	10	0.18%	-1,919	-34.70%	5,531
Stewart	985	29.69%	2,274	68.54%	42	1.27%	11	0.33%	6	0.18%	-1,289	-38.85%	3,318
Sullivan	25,963	51.44%	22,341	44.27%	1,874	3.71%	196	0.39%	96	0.19%	3,622	7.17%	50,470
Sumner	11,876	44.42%	14,150	52.93%	540	2.02%	138	0.52%	31	0.12%	-2,274	-8.51%	26,735
Tipton	4,339	46.15%	4,934	52.48%	109	1.16%	16	0.17%	3	0.03%	-595	-6.33%	9,401
Trousdale	629	26.72%	1,674	71.11%	30	1.27%	14	0.59%	7	0.30%	-1,045	-44.39%	2,354
Unicoi	3,828	65.50%	1,880	32.17%	97	1.66%	18	0.31%	21	0.36%	1,948	33.33%	5,844
Union	2,453	62.09%	1,435	36.32%	45	1.14%	12	0.30%	6	0.15%	1,018	25.77%	3,951
Van Buren	499	35.54%	886	63.11%	11	0.78%	4	0.28%	4	0.28%	-387	-27.57%	1,404
Warren	3,680	37.16%	6,021	60.79%	148	1.49%	41	0.41%	14	0.14%	-2,341	-23.63%	9,904
Washington	17,457	57.71%	11,599	38.35%	934	3.09%	173	0.57%	86	0.28%	5,858	19.36%	30,249
Wayne	3,418	64.53%	1,633	30.83%	78	1.47%	38	0.72%	130	2.45%	1,785	33.70%	5,297
Weakley	5,668	48.15%	5,910	50.21%	136	1.16%	51	0.43%	6	0.05%	-242	-2.06%	11,771
White	2,100	37.41%	3,415	60.84%	64	1.14%	28	0.50%	6	0.11%	-1,315	-23.43%	5,613
Williamson	11,597	54.98%	8,815	41.79%	551	2.61%	104	0.49%	28	0.13%	2,782	13.19%	21,095
Wilson	7,535	39.09%	11,248	58.36%	380	1.97%	92	0.48%	19	0.10%	-3,713	-19.27%	19,274
Totals	787,761	48.70%	783,051	48.41%	35,991	2.22%	7,116	0.44%	3,697	0.23%	4,710	0.29%	1,617,616

==== Counties that flipped from Democratic to Republican ====
- Anderson
- Bledsoe
- Campbell
- Carroll
- Chester
- Claiborne
- Cumberland
- Fentress
- Hamblen
- Hardin
- Lawrence
- Loudon
- Madison
- McMinn
- McNairy
- Meigs
- Monroe
- Morgan
- Rhea
- Roane
- Sequatchie
- Sullivan
- Williamson

=== Results by congressional district ===
In Tennessee, Reagan won 5 out of the 8 congressional districts, including two that elected Democrats, while Carter won the other three.

District	Reagan	Carter	Representative
1st	61.3%	36.2%	Jimmy Quillen
2nd	58.3%	38.7%	John Duncan Sr.
3rd	56.6%	41.2%	Marilyn Lloyd
4th	41.2%	57.0%	Al Gore
5th	39.0%	58.4%	Bill Boner
6th	53.7%	44.2%	Robin Beard
7th	50.6%	47.8%	Ed Jones
8th	29.6%	68.4%	Harold Ford Sr.

== See also ==
- United States presidential elections in Tennessee
- Presidency of Ronald Reagan

== Works cited ==
- Black, Earl; Black, Merle (1992). The Vital South: How Presidents Are Elected. Harvard University Press. ISBN 0674941306.
