= United States presidential elections in Tennessee =

Presidential elections in Tennessee
- Number of elections: 57
- Voted Democratic: 25
- Voted Republican: 19
- Voted Whig: 5
- Voted Democratic-Republican: 7
- Voted other: 1 (Note: John Bell, 1860.)
- Voted for winning candidate: 37
- Voted for losing candidate: 18

Following is a table of United States presidential elections in Tennessee, ordered by year. Since its admission to statehood in 1796, Tennessee has participated in every U.S. presidential election except the election of 1864, during the American Civil War. At that time, Tennessee was controlled by the Union and held elections, but electors were not ultimately counted.

Between the end of the Civil War and the mid-20th century, Tennessee was part of the Democratic Solid South, but had the largest Republican minority of any former Confederate state. During this time, East Tennessee was heavily Republican and the western two thirds mostly voted Democratic, with the latter dominating the state. This division was related to the state's pattern of Unionist and Confederate loyalism during the Civil War.

Tennessee's politics are currently dominated by the Republican Party. Republicans currently hold both of the state's U.S. Senate seats, a majority of Congressional seats, and the state legislature. Democratic strength is largely concentrated in Nashville, Memphis, and parts of Knoxville, Chattanooga, and Clarksville. Some suburban areas of Nashville and Memphis also contain significant Democratic minorities.

Winners of the state are in bold. The shading refers to the state winner, and not the national winner.

== Elections from 1864 to present ==
View source data.

Year	Winner (nationally)	Votes	Percent	Runner-up (nationally)	Votes	Percent	Other national candidates (Note: For purposes of these lists, other national candidates are defined as those who won at least one electoral vote, or won at least ten percent of the vote in multiple states.)	Votes	Percent	Electoral votes	Notes
2024	**Donald Trump**	1,966,865	64.19	Kamala Harris	1,056,265	34.47	—			11	
2020	Joe Biden	1,143,711	37.45	**Donald Trump**	1,852,475	60.66	—			11	
2016	**Donald Trump** (Note: Won the electoral college while losing the popular vote)	1,522,925	60.72	Hillary Clinton	870,695	34.72	—			11	
2012	Barack Obama	960,709	39.08	**Mitt Romney**	1,462,330	59.48	—			11	
2008	Barack Obama	1,087,437	41.83	**John McCain**	1,479,178	56.90	—			11	
2004	**George W. Bush**	1,384,375	56.80	John Kerry	1,036,477	42.53	—			11	
2000	**George W. Bush**	1,061,949	51.15	Al Gore	981,720	47.28	—			11	
1996	**Bill Clinton**	909,146	48.00	Bob Dole	863,530	45.59	Ross Perot	105,918	5.59	11	
1992	**Bill Clinton**	933,521	47.08	George H. W. Bush	841,300	42.43	Ross Perot	199,968	10.09	11	
1988	**George H. W. Bush**	947,233	57.89	Michael Dukakis	679,794	41.55	—			11	
1984	**Ronald Reagan**	990,212	57.84	Walter Mondale	711,714	41.57	—			11	
1980	**Ronald Reagan**	787,761	48.70	Jimmy Carter	783,051	48.41	John B. Anderson	35,991	2.22	10	
1976	**Jimmy Carter**	825,879	55.94	Gerald Ford	633,969	42.94	—			10	
1972	**Richard Nixon**	813,147	67.70	George McGovern	357,293	29.75	—			10	
1968	**Richard Nixon**	472,592	37.85	Hubert Humphrey	351,233	28.13	George Wallace	424,792	34.02	11	
1964	**Lyndon B. Johnson**	634,947	55.50	Barry Goldwater	508,965	44.49	—			11	
1960	John F. Kennedy	481,453	45.77	**Richard Nixon**	556,577	52.92	—			11	
1956	**Dwight D. Eisenhower**	462,288	49.21	Adlai Stevenson II	456,507	48.60	T. Coleman Andrews/ Unpledged Electors (Note: Was allied with a slate of unpledged electors in Louisiana, Mississippi and South Carolina)	19,820	2.11	11	
1952	**Dwight D. Eisenhower**	446,147	49.99	Adlai Stevenson II	443,710	49.71	—			11	
1948	**Harry S. Truman**	270,402	49.14	Thomas E. Dewey	202,914	36.87	Strom Thurmond	73,815	13.41	12	Electoral vote split: 11 for Truman, 1 for Thurmond (faithless elector).
1944	**Franklin D. Roosevelt**	308,707	60.45	Thomas E. Dewey	200,311	39.22	—			12	
1940	**Franklin D. Roosevelt**	351,601	67.25	Wendell Willkie	169,153	32.35	—			11	
1936	**Franklin D. Roosevelt**	328,083	68.85	Alf Landon	146,520	30.75	—			11	
1932	**Franklin D. Roosevelt**	259,473	66.49	Herbert Hoover	126,752	32.48	—			11	
1928	**Herbert Hoover**	195,388	53.76	Al Smith	167,343	46.04	—			12	
1924	Calvin Coolidge	130,882	43.59	**John W. Davis**	158,537	52.8	Robert M. La Follette	10,656	3.55	12	
1920	**Warren G. Harding**	219,829	51.29	James M. Cox	206,558	48.19	Parley P. Christensen	—	—	12	
1916	**Woodrow Wilson**	153,280	56.31	Charles E. Hughes	116,223	42.70	—			12	
1912	**Woodrow Wilson**	133,021	52.80	Theodore Roosevelt	54,041	21.45	William H. Taft	60,475	24.00	12	
1908	William H. Taft	117,977	45.87	**William Jennings Bryan**	135,608	52.73	—			12	
1904	Theodore Roosevelt	105,363	43.40	**Alton B. Parker**	131,653	54.23	—			12	
1900	William McKinley	123,108	44.95	**William Jennings Bryan**	145,240	53.03	—			12	
1896	William McKinley	148,683	46.33	**William Jennings Bryan**	167,168	52.09	—			12	
1892	**Grover Cleveland**	136,468	51.36	Benjamin Harrison	100,537	37.83	James B. Weaver	23,918	9.00	12	
1888	Benjamin Harrison	138,978	45.76	**Grover Cleveland**	158,699	52.26	—			12	
1884	**Grover Cleveland**	133,770	51.45	James G. Blaine	124,101	47.74	—			12	
1880	James A. Garfield	107,677	44.26	**Winfield S. Hancock**	129,569	53.26	James B. Weaver	6,017	2.47	12	
1876	Rutherford B. Hayes	89,566	40.21	**Samuel J. Tilden**	133,177	59.79	—			12	
1872	Ulysses S. Grant	85,655	47.84	**Horace Greeley**	93,391	52.16	—			12	
1868	**Ulysses S. Grant**	56,628	68.4	Horatio Seymour	26,129	31.6	—			10	
1864	**Abraham Lincoln**			George B. McClellan			—				Under Union control by 1864 and held elections, but electors (who voted for Lincoln) were not ultimately counted.

== Election of 1860 ==
The election of 1860 was a complex realigning election in which the breakdown of the previous two-party alignment culminated in four parties each competing for influence in different parts of the country. The result of the election, with the victory of an ardent opponent of slavery, spurred the secession of eleven states, including Tennessee, and brought about the American Civil War.

Year	Winner (nationally)	Votes	Percent	Runner-up (nationally)	Votes	Percent	Runner-up (nationally)	Votes	Percent	Runner-up (nationally)	Votes	Percent	Electoral votes
1860	Abraham Lincoln	no ballots		Stephen A. Douglas	11,281	7.7	John C. Breckinridge	65,097	44.6	**John Bell**	69,728	47.7	12

== Elections from 1828 to 1856 ==
Year	Winner (nationally)	Votes	Percent	Runner-up (nationally)	Votes	Percent	Other national candidates	Votes	Percent	Electoral votes	Notes
1856	**James Buchanan**	69,704	52.18	John C. Frémont	no ballots		Millard Fillmore	63,878	47.82	12	
1852	Franklin Pierce	56,900	49.27	**Winfield Scott**	58,586	50.73	John P. Hale	no ballots		12	
1848	**Zachary Taylor**	64,321	52.52	Lewis Cass	58,142	47.48	Martin Van Buren	no ballots		13	
1844	James K. Polk	59,917	49.95	**Henry Clay**	60,040	50.05	—			13	
1840	**William Henry Harrison**	60,194	55.66	Martin Van Buren	47,951	44.34	—			15	
1836	Martin Van Buren	26,170	42.08	**Hugh Lawson White**	36,027	57.92	various (Note: Three other candidates ran and received electoral votes nationally as part of the unsuccessful Whig strategy to defeat Martin Van Buren by running four candidates with local appeal in different regions of the country. The others were William Henry Harrison, Daniel Webster, and Willie Person Mangum. None of these candidates appeared on the ballot in Tennessee.)			15	
1832	**Andrew Jackson**	28,078	95.42	Henry Clay	1,347	4.58	William Wirt	no ballots		15	
1828	**Andrew Jackson**	44,293	95.19	John Quincy Adams	2,240	4.81	—			11	

== Election of 1824 ==
The election of 1824 was a complex realigning election following the collapse of the prevailing Democratic-Republican Party, resulting in four different candidates each claiming to carry the banner of the party, and competing for influence in different parts of the country. The election was the only one in history to be decided by the House of Representatives under the provisions of the Twelfth Amendment to the United States Constitution after no candidate secured a majority of the electoral vote. It was also the only presidential election in which the candidate who received a plurality of electoral votes (Andrew Jackson) did not become president, a source of great bitterness for Jackson and his supporters, who proclaimed the election of Adams a corrupt bargain.

Year	Winner (nationally)	Votes	Percent	Runner-up (nationally)	Votes	Percent	Runner-up (nationally)	Votes	Percent	Runner-up (nationally)	Votes	Percent	Electoral votes
1824	**Andrew Jackson**	20,197	97.45	John Quincy Adams	216	1.04	Henry Clay	no ballots		William H. Crawford	312	1.51	11

== Elections of from 1796 to 1820 ==
In the election of 1820, incumbent President James Monroe ran effectively unopposed, winning all eight of Tennessee's electoral votes, and all electoral votes nationwide except one vote in New Hampshire. To the extent that a popular vote was held, it was primarily directed to filling the office of vice president.

Year	Winner (nationally)	Runner-up (nationally)	Electoral votes	Notes
1820	**James Monroe**	-	7	Monroe effectively ran unopposed.
1816	**James Monroe**	Rufus King	8	
1812	**James Madison**	DeWitt Clinton	8	
1808	**James Madison**	Charles C. Pinckney	5	
1804	**Thomas Jefferson**	Charles C. Pinckney	5	
1800	**Thomas Jefferson**	John Adams	3	
1796	John Adams	**Thomas Jefferson**	3	

== Results Maps ==
1972 United States presidential election

1976 United States presidential election

1980 United States presidential election

1984 United States presidential election

1988 United States presidential election

1996 United States presidential election

1996 United States presidential election

2000 United States presidential election

2004 United States presidential election

2008 United States presidential election

2012 United States presidential election

2016 United States presidential election

2020 United States presidential election

2024 United States presidential election

== See also ==
- Political party strength in Tennessee
- Elections in Tennessee
