= 1856 United States presidential election in Tennessee =

- November 4, 1856
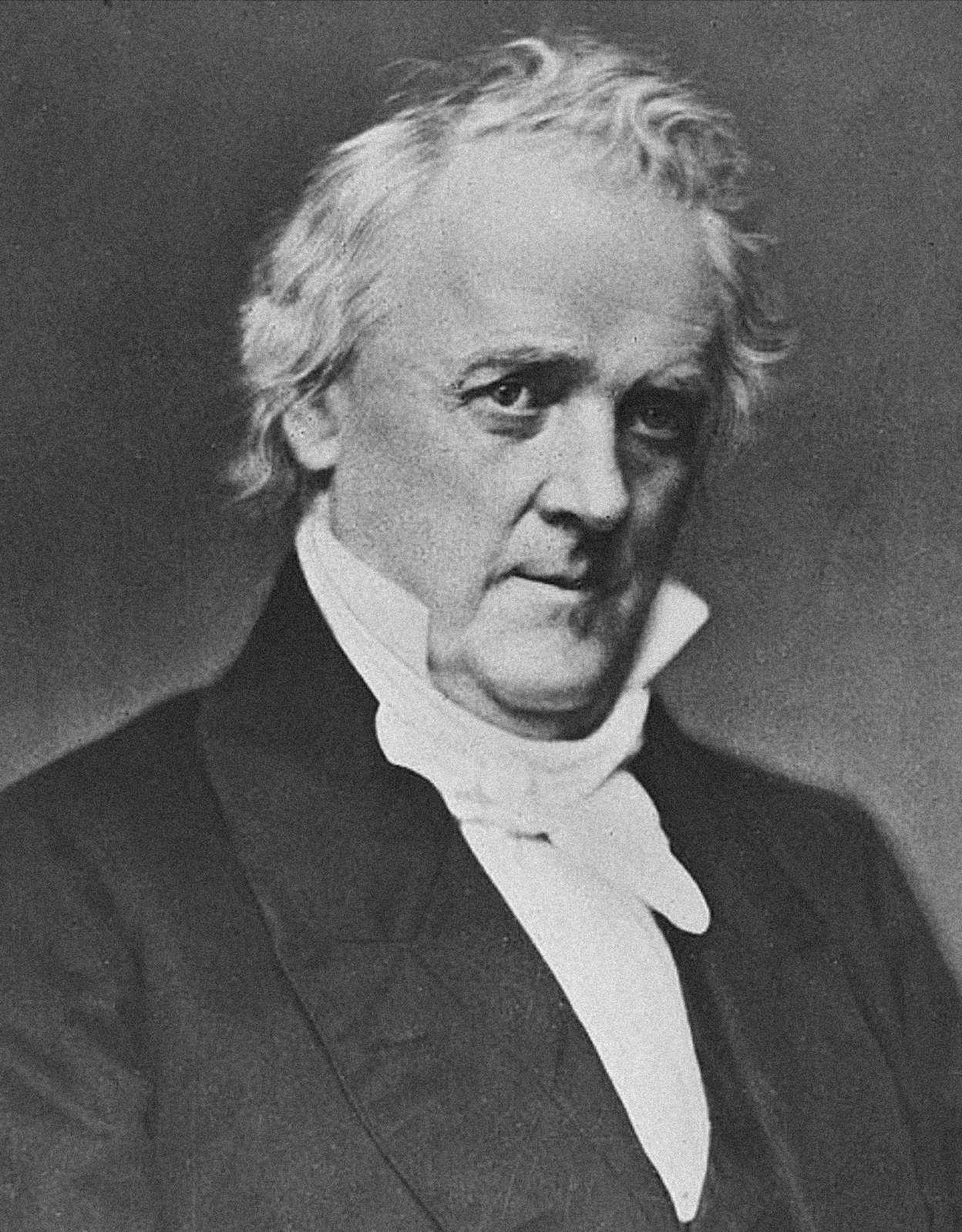

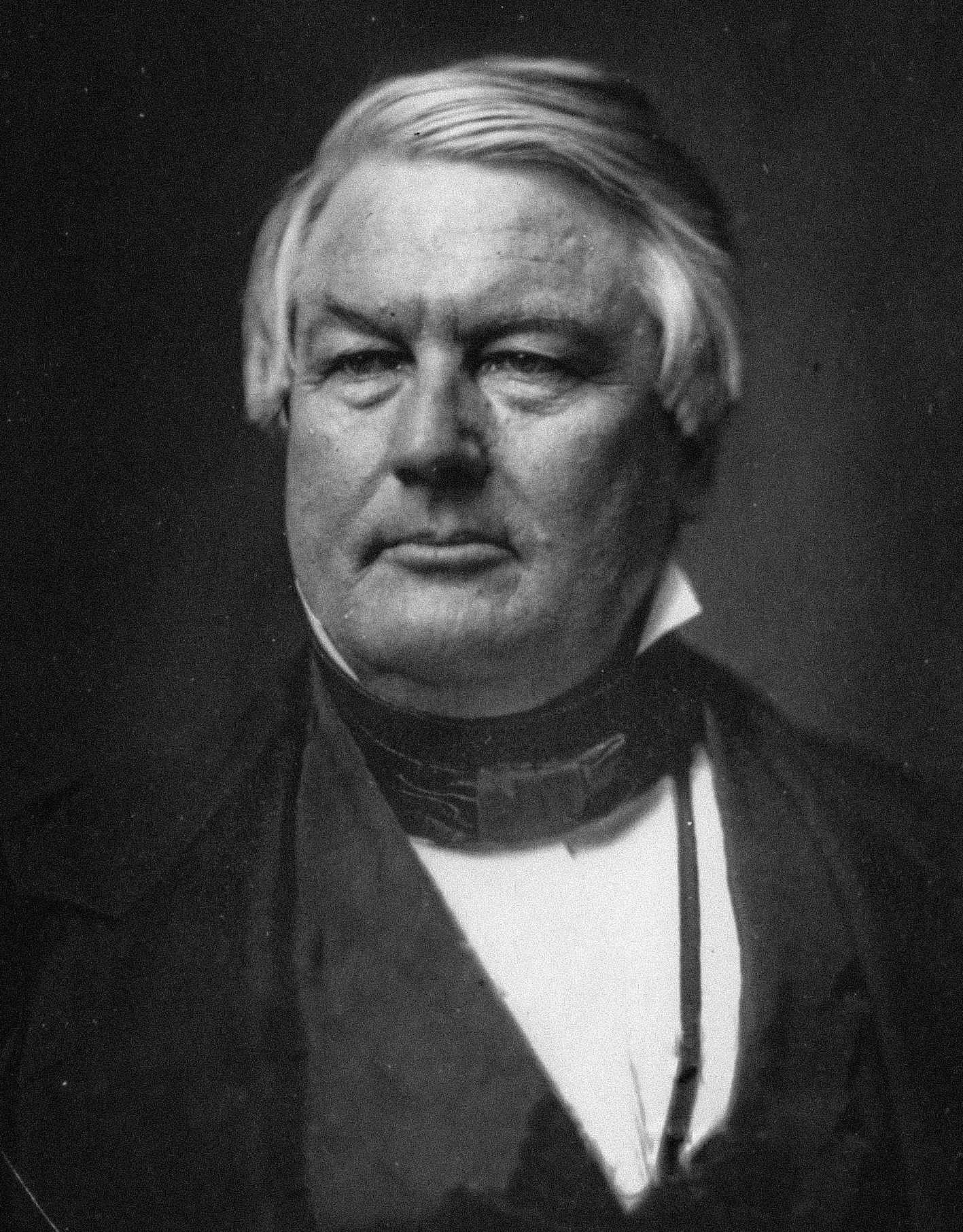
Nominee	James Buchanan	Millard Fillmore
Party	Democratic	Know Nothing
Home state	Pennsylvania	New York
Running mate	John C. Breckinridge	Andrew Jackson Donelson
Electoral vote	12	0
Popular vote	69,704	63,878
Percentage	52.18%	47.82%
County results
Buchanan
50–60%
60–70%
70–80%
80–90%
90–100%
Fillmore
50–60%
60–70%
70–80%
80–90%
Unknown/No vote
President before election
Franklin Pierce
Democratic
Elected President
James Buchanan
Democratic

The 1856 United States presidential election in Tennessee took place on November 4, 1856, as part of the 1856 United States presidential election. Voters chose twelve representatives, or electors to the Electoral College, who voted for president and vice president.

Tennessee voted for the Democratic candidate, James Buchanan, over American Party candidate Millard Fillmore. Buchanan won Tennessee by a margin of 4.36 percentage points, although Tennessee was Fillmore's third-strongest state after Maryland and Louisiana.

Republican Party candidate John C. Frémont was not on the ballot in the state.

This was the only instance between 1832 and 1872 when a Democrat won Tennessee. This is the most recent election in which Scott County, Hancock County, and Washington County voted for a Democratic presidential nominee, although the latter two counties would be won by Southern Democratic nominee John C. Breckinridge in the next election.

== Results ==
1856 United States presidential election in Tennessee
Party	Candidate	Running mate	Popular vote		Electoral vote	
Party	Candidate	Running mate	Count	%	Count	%
Democratic	James Buchanan of Pennsylvania	John C. Breckinridge of Kentucky	69,704	52.18%	12	100.00%
Know Nothing	Millard Fillmore of New York	Andrew Jackson Donelson of Tennessee	63,878	47.82%	0	0.00%
Total			133,582	100.00%	12	100.00%

== See also ==
- United States presidential elections in Tennessee
