= 1840 United States presidential election in Tennessee =

- November 3, 1840
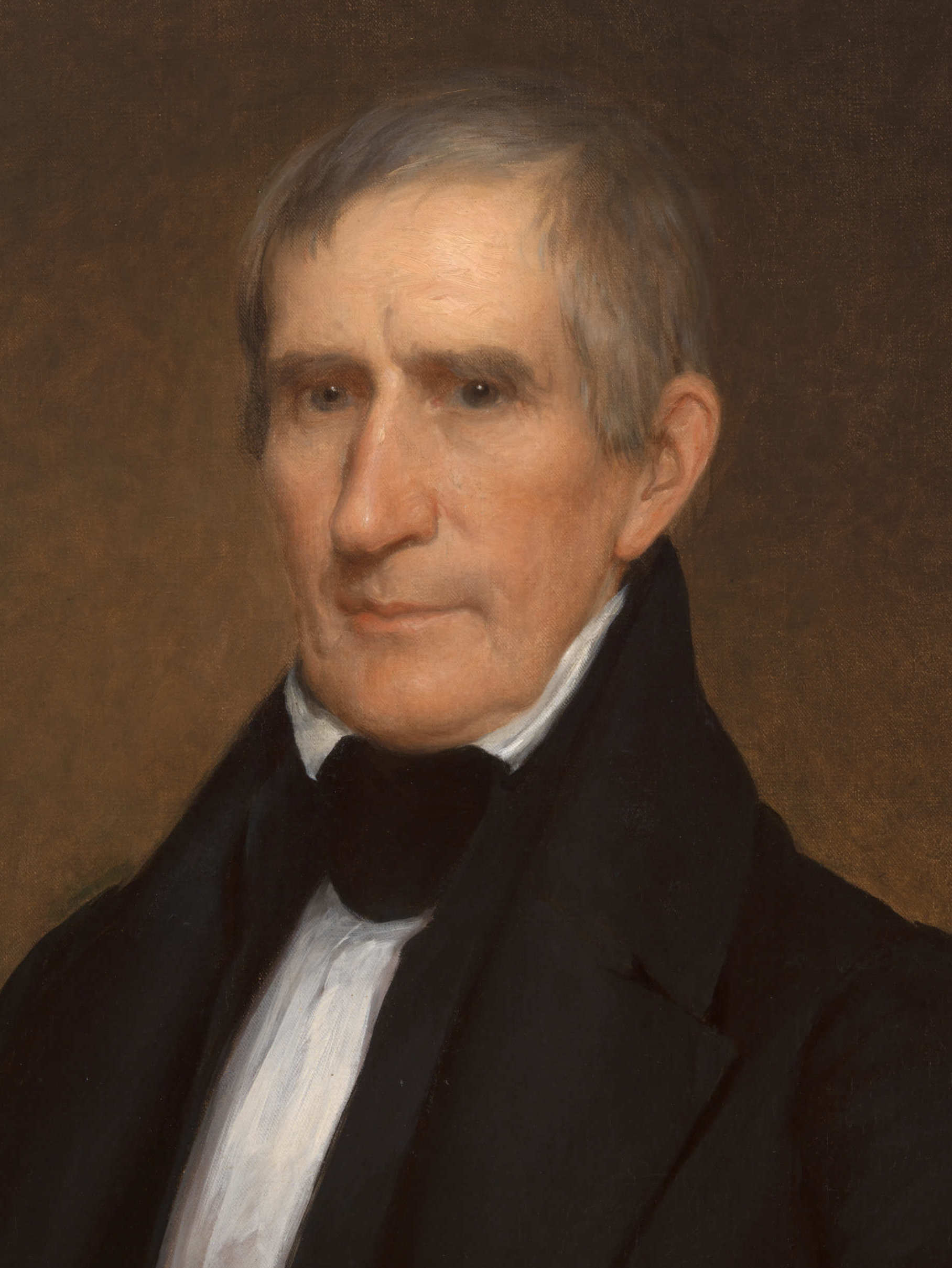

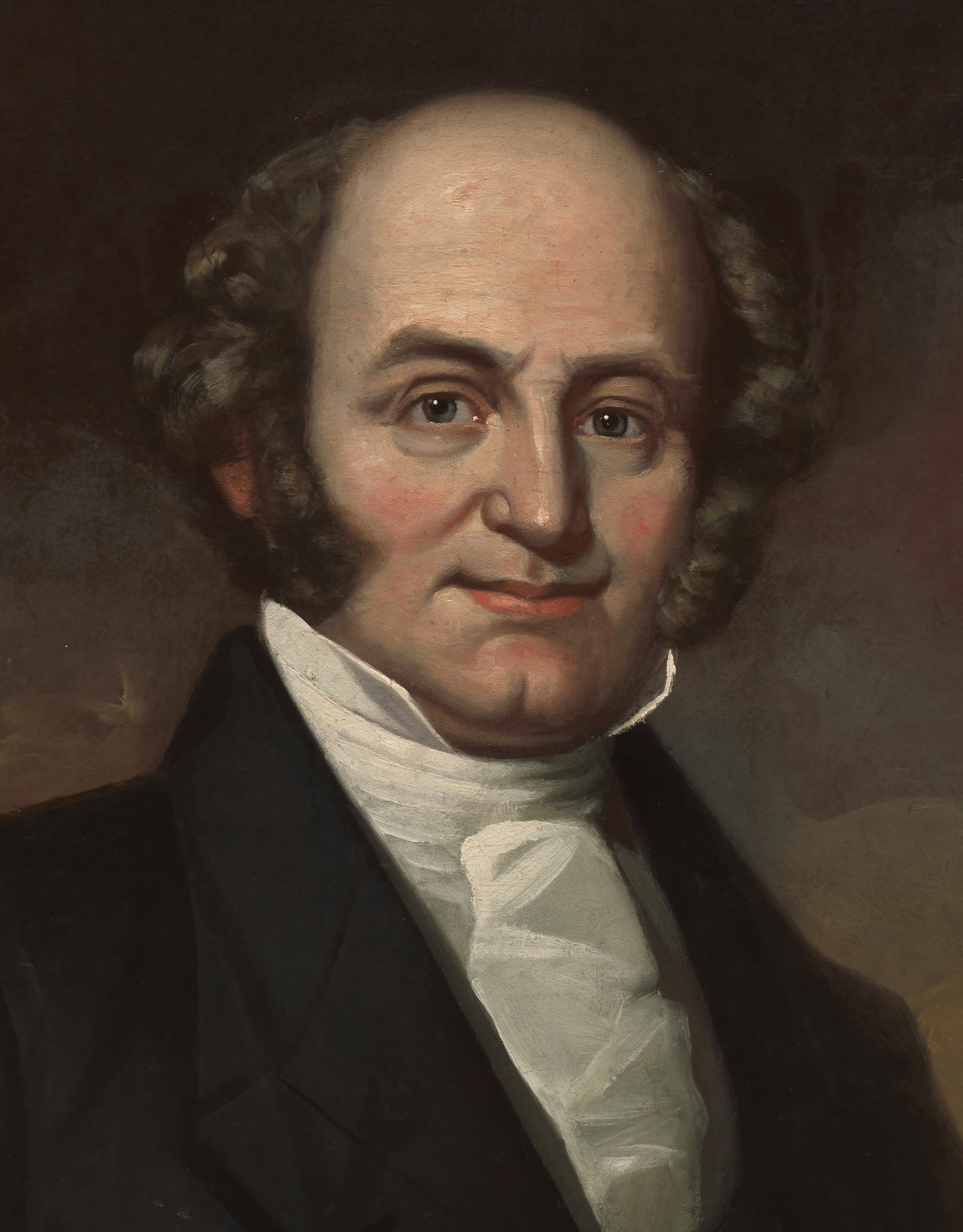
Nominee	William Henry Harrison	Martin Van Buren
Party	Whig	Democratic
Home state	Ohio	New York
Running mate	John Tyler	none
Electoral vote	15	0
Popular vote	60,194	47,951
Percentage	55.66%	44.34%
County results
Harrison
50–60%
60–70%
70–80%
80–90%
90–100%
Van Buren
50–60%
60–70%
70–80%
80–90%
Unknown/No vote
President before election
Martin Van Buren
Democratic
Elected President
William Henry Harrison
Whig

The 1840 United States presidential election in Tennessee was held on November 3, 1840 as part of the 1840 United States presidential election. Voters chose 15 representatives, or electors to the Electoral College, who voted for President and Vice President.

Tennessee voted for the Whig candidate, William Henry Harrison, over Democratic candidate Martin Van Buren. Harrison won the state by a margin of 11.32%.

== Results ==
1840 United States presidential election in Tennessee
Party	Candidate	Running mate	Popular vote		Electoral vote	
Party	Candidate	Running mate	Count	%	Count	%
Whig	William Henry Harrison of Ohio	John Tyler of Virginia	60,194	55.66%	15	100.00%
Democratic	Martin Van Buren of New York	Richard Mentor Johnson of Kentucky	47,951	44.34%	0	0.00%
Total			108,145	100.00%	15	100.00%

== See also ==
- United States presidential elections in Tennessee
