= 1860 United States presidential election in Tennessee =

- November 6, 1860
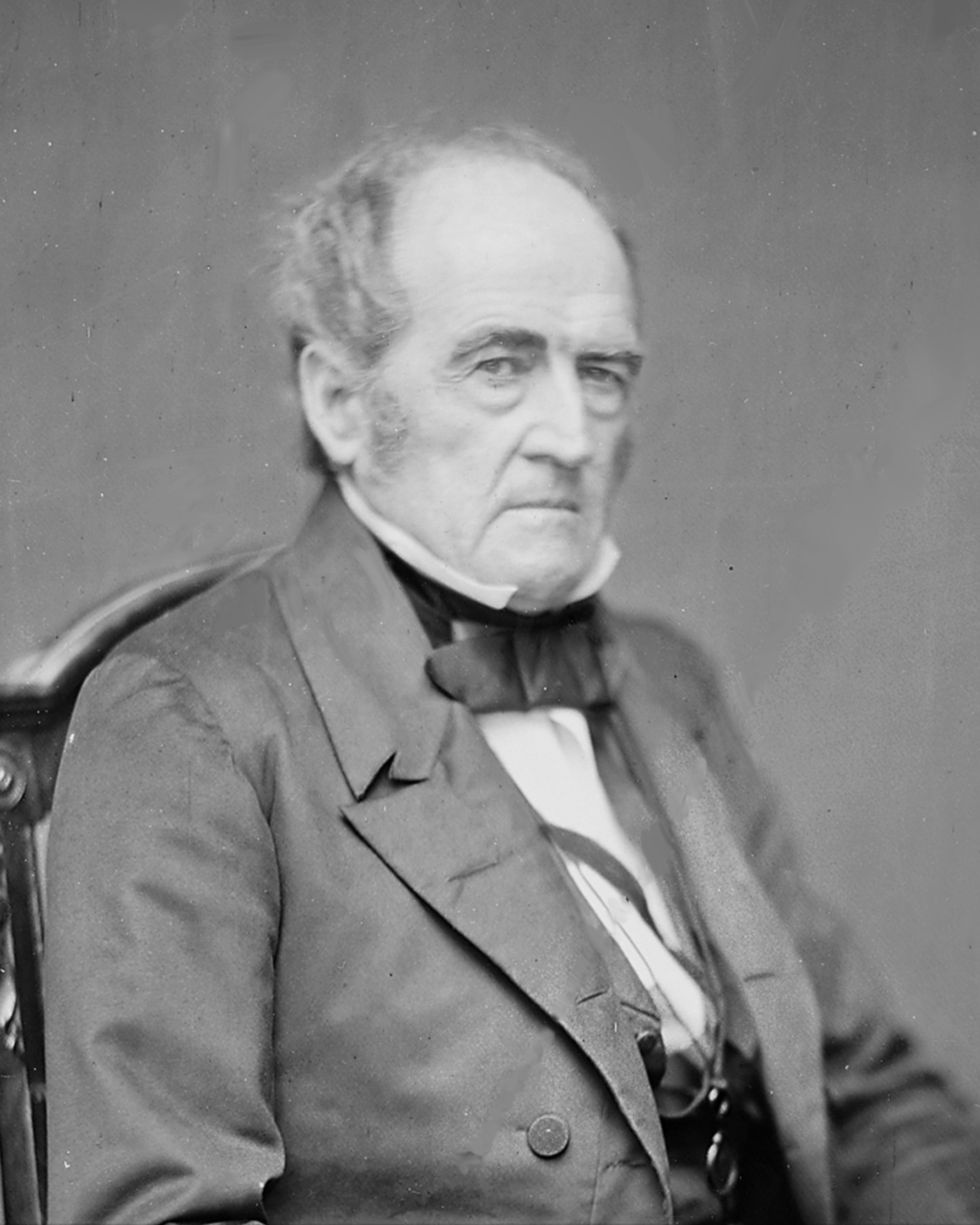

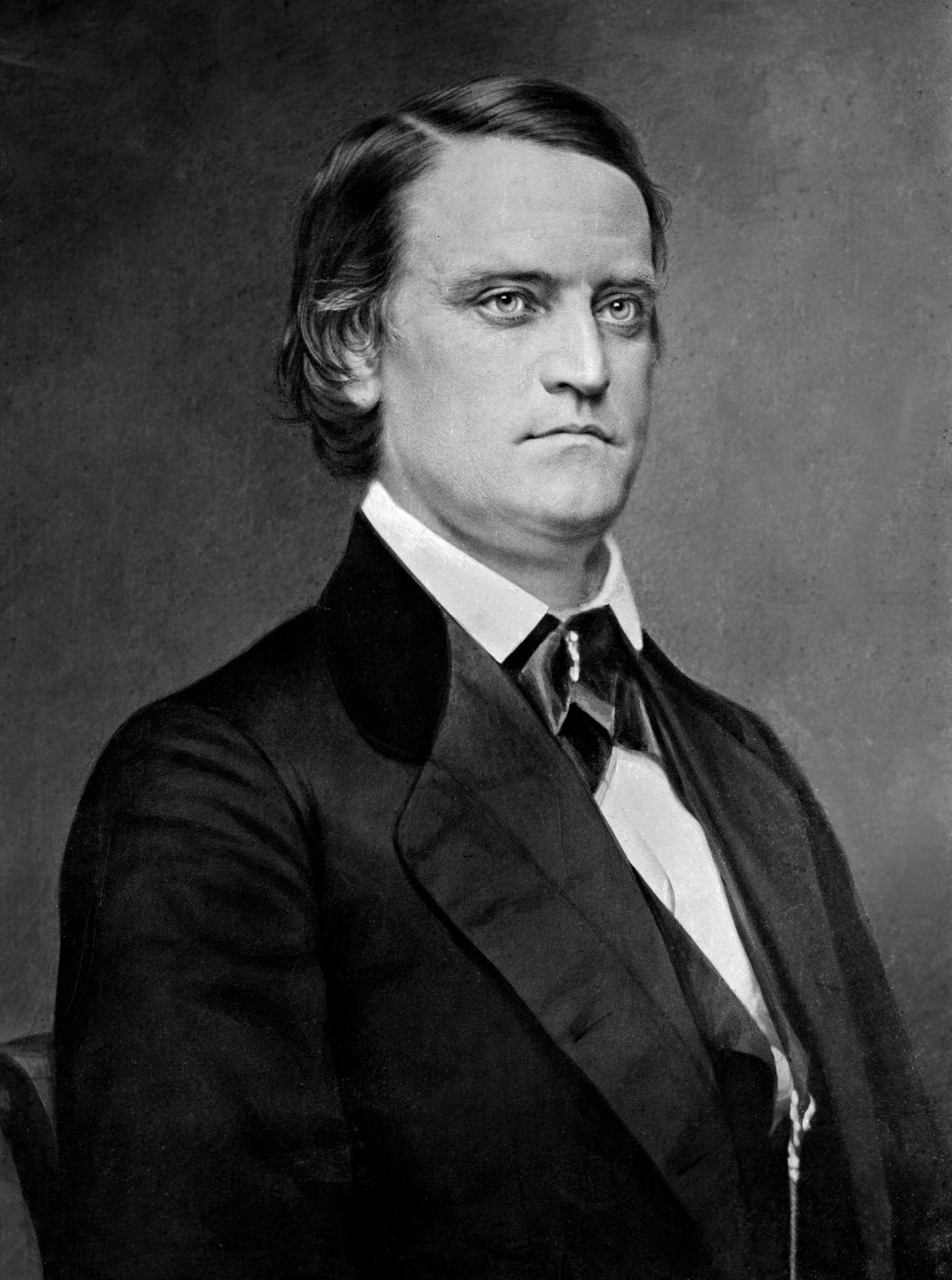

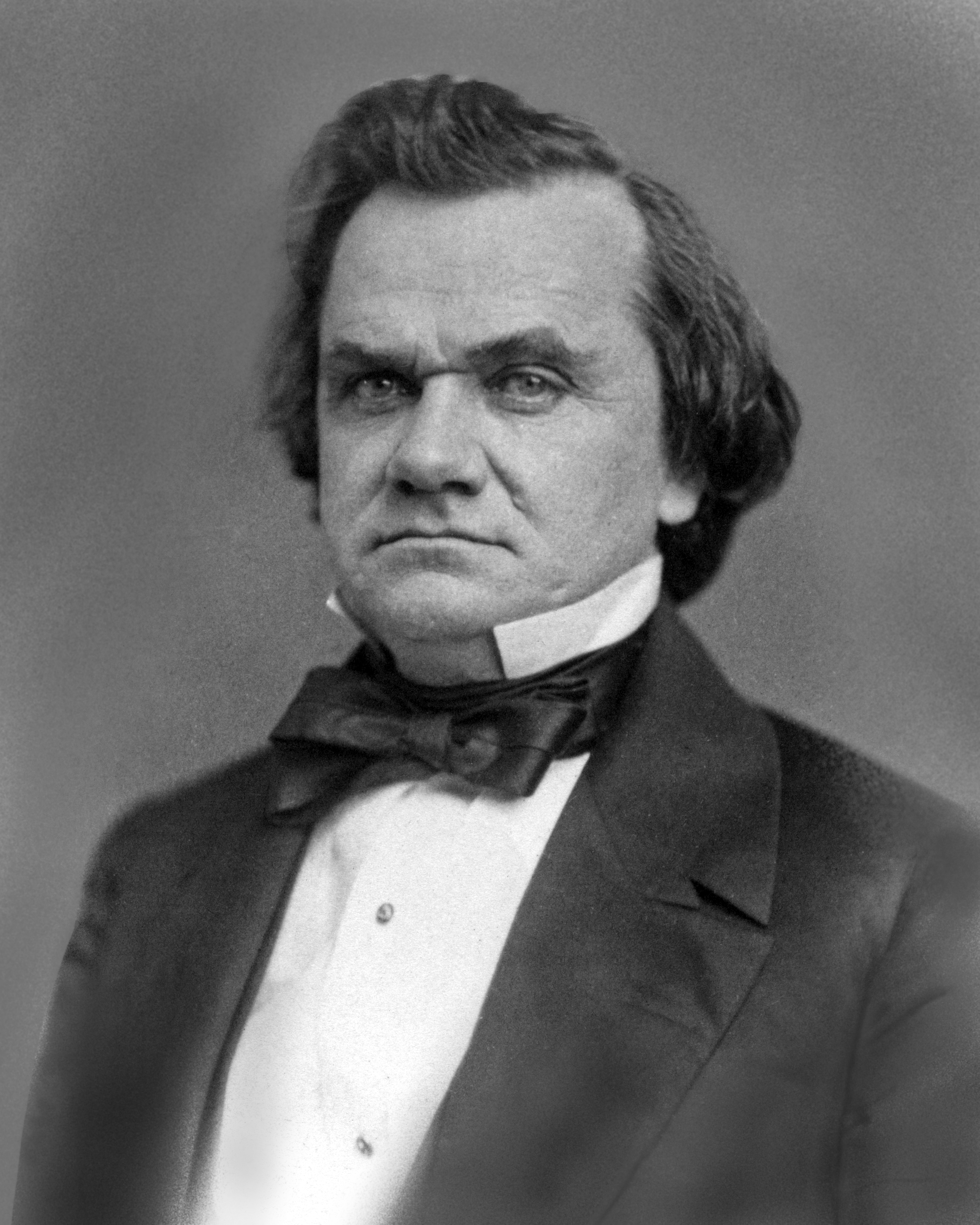
Nominee	John Bell	John C. Breckinridge	Stephen A. Douglas
Party	Constitutional Union	Southern Democratic	Democratic
Home state	Tennessee	Kentucky	Illinois
Running mate	Edward Everett	Joseph Lane	Herschel V. Johnson
Electoral vote	12	0	0
Popular vote	69,728	65,097	11,281
Percentage	47.72%	44.55%	7.72%
County results
Bell
30–40%
40–50%
50–60%
60–70%
70–80%
80–90%
Breckinridge
40–50%
50–60%
60–70%
70–80%
80–90%
Douglas
40–50%
President before election
James Buchanan
Democratic
Elected President
Abraham Lincoln
Republican

The 1860 United States presidential election in Tennessee took place on November 6, 1860, as part of the 1860 United States presidential election. Voters chose 12 representatives, or electors, to the Electoral College, who voted for president and vice president.

Tennessee was won by the Constitutional Union candidate and Tennessee native Senator John Bell and his running mate the 15th Governor of Massachusetts Edward Everett. They defeated the Southern Democratic candidate 14th Vice President of the United States John C. Breckinridge of Kentucky) and his running mate Senator Joseph Lane of Oregon as well as Democratic candidate Senator Stephen A. Douglas of Illinois and his running mate 41st Governor of Georgia Herschel V. Johnson. Bell won the state by a narrow margin of 3.17%.

Republican Party candidate and president-elect Abraham Lincoln did not have significant ballot distribution in the state. Tennessee was the only one of ten states where Lincoln was noncompetitive that would be carried by a candidate other than Breckinridge. Nonetheless, this is the last election in which Unionist Cocke County and Hancock County were not carried by the Republican presidential nominee.

== Results ==
1860 United States presidential election in Tennessee
Party	Candidate	Votes	%
Constitutional Union	John Bell	69,728	47.72%
Southern Democratic	John C. Breckinridge	65,097	44.55%
Democratic	Stephen A. Douglas	11,281	7.72%
Total votes		146,106	100.00%

=== Results by county ===
1860 United States Presidential Election in Tennessee (by county)
County	John Bell Constitutional Union		John C. Breckinridge Southern Democratic		Stephen A. Douglas Democratic		Total votes cast
County	#	%	#	%	#	%	Total votes cast
Anderson	614	62.46%	339	34.49%	30	3.05%	983
Bedford	1,506	51.40%	1,389	47.41%	35	1.19%	2,930
Benton	452	38.63%	713	60.94%	5	0.43%	1,170
Bledsoe	361	62.67%	177	30.73%	38	6.60%	576
Blount	1,261	66.58%	586	30.94%	47	2.48%	1,894
Bradley	710	40.11%	759	42.88%	301	17.01%	1,770
Campbell	345	54.25%	271	42.61%	20	3.14%	636
Cannon	445	32.08%	922	66.47%	20	1.44%	1,387
Carroll	1,570	64.45%	737	30.25%	129	5.30%	2,436
Carter	859	79.61%	205	19.00%	15	1.39%	1,079
Claiborne	614	45.75%	718	53.50%	10	0.75%	1,342
Cocke	933	65.70%	473	33.31%	14	0.99%	1,420
Coffee	361	24.57%	1,101	74.95%	7	0.48%	1,469
Cumberland	261	52.10%	236	47.11%	4	0.80%	501
Davidson (Note: Vote of Cheatham County included in Davidson, Montgomery, and Robertson Counties.)	3,850	67.96%	2,432	42.93%	383	6.76%	5,665
Decatur	473	51.64%	362	39.52%	81	8.84%	916
DeKalb	677	43.07%	882	56.11%	13	0.83%	1,572
Dickson	427	33.33%	768	59.95%	86	6.71%	1,281
Dyer	798	56.92%	450	32.10%	154	10.98%	1,402
Fayette	953	50.16%	364	19.16%	583	30.68%	1,900
Fentress	135	21.81%	468	75.61%	16	2.58%	619
Franklin	388	20.00%	1,526	78.66%	26	1.34%	1,940
Gibson	1,909	59.86%	1,039	32.58%	241	7.56%	3,189
Giles	1,313	45.12%	1,511	51.92%	86	2.96%	2,910
Grainger	1,047	60.49%	667	38.53%	17	0.98%	1,731
Greene	1,048	33.38%	2,054	65.41%	38	1.21%	3,140
Grundy	74	14.65%	431	85.35%	0	0.00%	505
Hamilton	1,074	52.16%	820	39.83%	165	8.01%	2,059
Hancock	309	37.68%	493	60.12%	18	2.20%	820
Haywood	885	52.03%	358	21.05%	458	26.93%	1,701
Hardeman	767	36.95%	555	26.73%	754	36.32%	2,076
Hawkins	1,067	46.27%	1,155	50.09%	84	3.64%	2,306
Hardin	671	43.83%	718	46.90%	142	9.27%	1,531
Henderson	1,246	64.53%	611	31.64%	74	3.83%	1,931
Henry	888	32.65%	1,808	66.47%	24	0.88%	2,720
Hickman	273	20.13%	1,067	78.69%	16	1.18%	1,356
Humphreys	350	34.38%	654	64.24%	14	1.38%	1,018
Jackson	1,182	52.19%	1,050	46.36%	33	1.46%	2,265
Jefferson	1,625	69.41%	681	29.09%	35	1.50%	2,341
Johnson	508	77.91%	140	21.47%	4	0.61%	652
Knox	2,471	71.46%	859	24.84%	128	3.70%	3,458
Lauderdale	493	52.73%	172	18.40%	270	28.88%	935
Lawrence	470	38.59%	690	56.65%	58	4.76%	1,218
Lewis	40	13.20%	255	84.16%	8	2.64%	303
Lincoln	517	15.90%	2,442	75.09%	293	9.01%	3,252
Macon	563	55.20%	430	42.16%	27	2.65%	1,020
Madison	1,441	61.85%	460	19.74%	429	18.41%	2,330
Marion	498	55.27%	347	38.51%	56	6.22%	901
Marshall	662	32.59%	1,326	65.29%	43	2.12%	2,031
Maury	1,434	44.42%	1,731	53.62%	63	1.95%	3,228
McMinn	986	46.84%	978	46.46%	141	6.70%	2,105
McNairy	1,064	51.38%	493	23.80%	514	24.82%	2,071
Meigs	150	19.76%	521	68.64%	88	11.59%	759
Monroe	915	44.29%	1,099	53.19%	52	2.52%	2,066
Montgomery (Note: Vote of Cheatham County included in Davidson, Montgomery, and Robertson Counties.)	1,426	55.64%	1,042	40.66%	95	3.71%	2,563
Morgan	168	38.89%	218	50.46%	46	10.65%	432
Obion	686	39.52%	885	50.98%	165	9.50%	1,736
Overton	394	21.29%	1,417	76.55%	40	2.16%	1,851
Perry	391	42.04%	520	55.91%	19	2.04%	930
Polk	396	30.84%	825	64.25%	63	4.91%	1,284
Rhea	289	41.34%	386	55.22%	24	3.43%	699
Roane	1,105	55.61%	839	44.22%	43	2.16%	1,987
Robertson (Note: Vote of Cheatham County included in Davidson, Montgomery, and Robertson Counties.)	1,309	56.47%	930	40.12%	79	3.41%	2,318
Rutherford	1,540	50.23%	1,505	49.09%	21	0.68%	3,066
Scott	252	61.92%	154	37.84%	1	0.25%	407
Sequatchie	175	57.00%	104	33.88%	28	9.12%	307
Sevier	1,035	84.15%	188	15.28%	7	0.57%	1,230
Shelby	3,048	45.15%	744	11.02%	2,959	43.83%	6,751
Smith	1,475	68.51%	618	28.70%	60	2.79%	2,153
Stewart	612	39.69%	786	50.97%	144	9.34%	1,542
Sullivan	538	25.33%	1,517	71.42%	69	3.25%	2,124
Sumner	883	32.55%	1,677	61.81%	153	5.64%	2,713
Tipton	420	39.11%	91	8.47%	563	52.42%	1,074
Van Buren	116	36.83%	187	59.37%	12	3.81%	315
Warren	378	23.45%	1,220	75.68%	14	0.87%	1,612
Washington	967	40.89%	1,331	56.28%	67	2.83%	2,365
Wayne	701	60.12%	392	33.62%	73	6.26%	1,166
Weakley	900	38.12%	1,335	56.54%	126	5.34%	2,361
White	763	51.66%	686	46.45%	28	1.90%	1,477
Williamson	1,587	65.69%	797	32.99%	32	1.32%	2,416
Wilson	2,223	64.40%	1,166	33.78%	63	1.83%	3,452
Total	69,710	47.70%	65,053	44.51%	11,384	7.79%	146,147

== See also ==
- United States presidential elections in Tennessee
