= 1836 United States presidential election in Tennessee =

- November 7, 1836
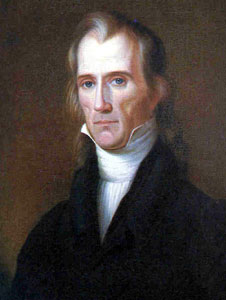

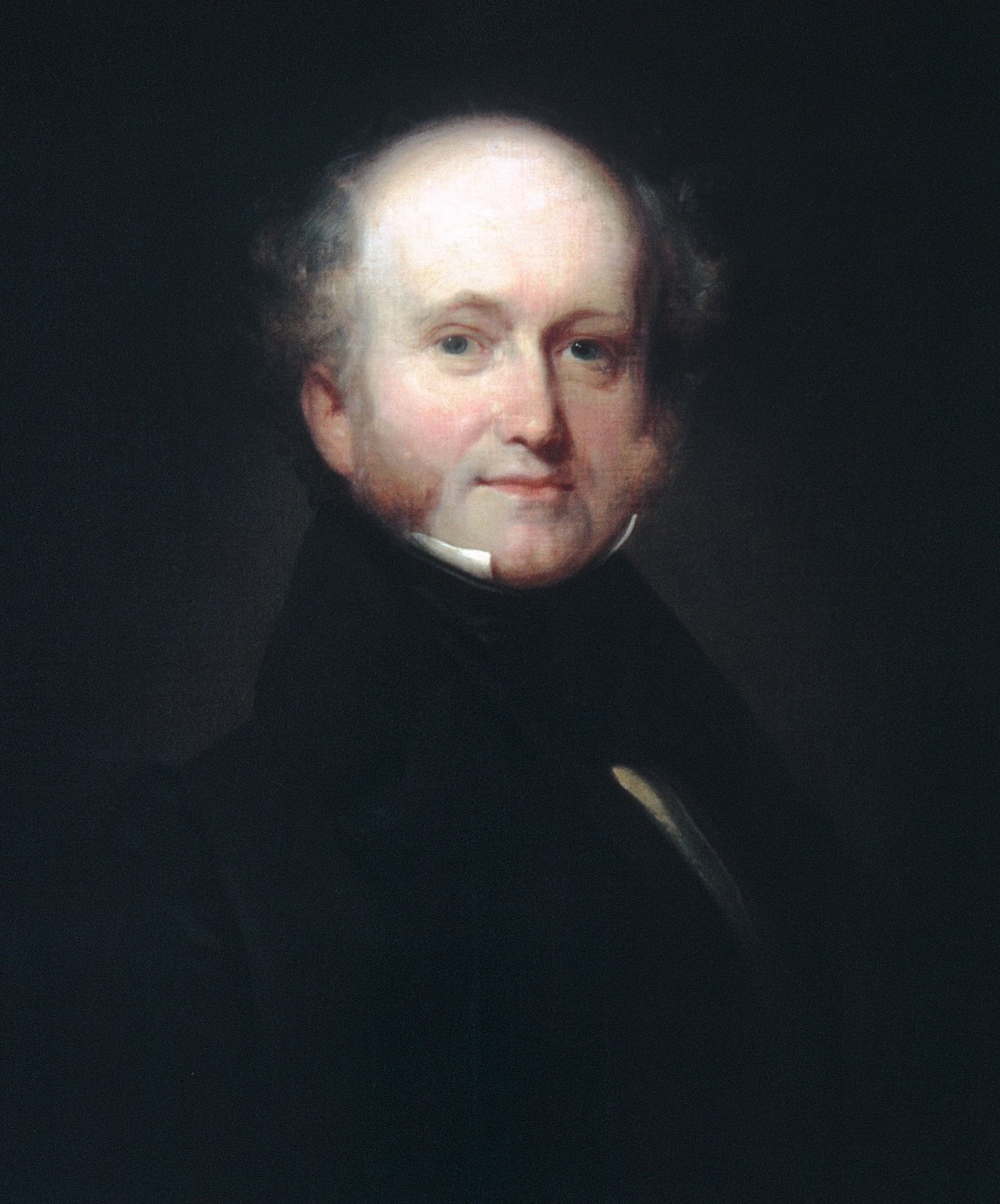
| Nominee | Hugh Lawson White | Martin Van Buren |
| Party | Whig | Democratic |
| Home state | Tennessee | New York |
| Running mate | John Tyler | Richard Mentor Johnson |
| Electoral vote | 15 | 0 |
| Popular vote | 36,027 | 26,170 |
| Percentage | 57.92% | 42.08% |
County results
White
50–60%
60–70%
70–80%
80–90%
90–100%
Van Buren
50–60%
60–70%
70–80%
80–90%
Unknown/No vote
President before election
Andrew Jackson
Democratic
Elected President
Martin Van Buren
Democratic

The 1836 United States presidential election in Tennessee was held on November 7, 1836 as part of the 1836 United States presidential election. Voters chose 15 representatives, or electors, to the Electoral College, who voted for President and Vice President.

The Whig Party, unable to agree on a candidate, ran four candidates against Democratic nominee Martin Van Buren: Hugh Lawson White, William Henry Harrison, Daniel Webster, and Willie Person Mangum. Tennessee Senator Hugh Lawson White was the Whig Party nominee in Tennessee.

During the campaign trail, Andrew Jackson actively campaigned against White in Tennessee and accused him of being a Federalist who was opposed to states' rights.

In spite of opposition from Jackson, Tennessee Whig nominee White won Tennessee, defeating Democratic nominee Van Buren, by a margin of 15.84%.

White also won Georgia, giving him 26 electoral votes, the third highest total behind Van Buren's 170, and Harrison's 73.

== Background ==
The 1835 Democratic National Convention chose a ticket of Van Buren (President Andrew Jackson's handpicked successor) and U.S. Representative Richard Mentor Johnson of Kentucky. The Whig Party, which had only recently emerged and was primarily united by opposition to Jackson, was not yet sufficiently organized to agree on a single candidate. Hoping to compel a contingent election in the House of Representatives by denying the Democrats an electoral majority, the Whigs ran multiple candidates. Most Northern and border state Whigs supported the ticket led by former Senator William Henry Harrison of Ohio, while most Southern Whigs supported the ticket led by Senator Hugh Lawson White of Tennessee. Two other Whigs, Daniel Webster and Willie Person Mangum, carried Massachusetts and South Carolina respectively on single-state tickets.

== Results ==
1836 United States presidential election in Tennessee
| Party | Candidate | Running mate | Popular vote | | Electoral vote | |
| Party | Candidate | Running mate | Count | % | Count | % |
|---|---|---|---|---|---|---|
| Whig | Hugh Lawson White of Tennessee | John Tyler of Virginia | 36,027 | 57.92% | 15 | 100.00% |
| Democratic | Martin Van Buren of New York | Richard Mentor Johnson of Kentucky | 26,170 | 42.08% | 0 | 0.00% |
| Total | | | 62,197 | 100.00% | 15 | 100.00% |

== See also ==
- United States presidential elections in Tennessee
