= 1824 United States presidential election in Tennessee =

- October 26 – December 2, 1824
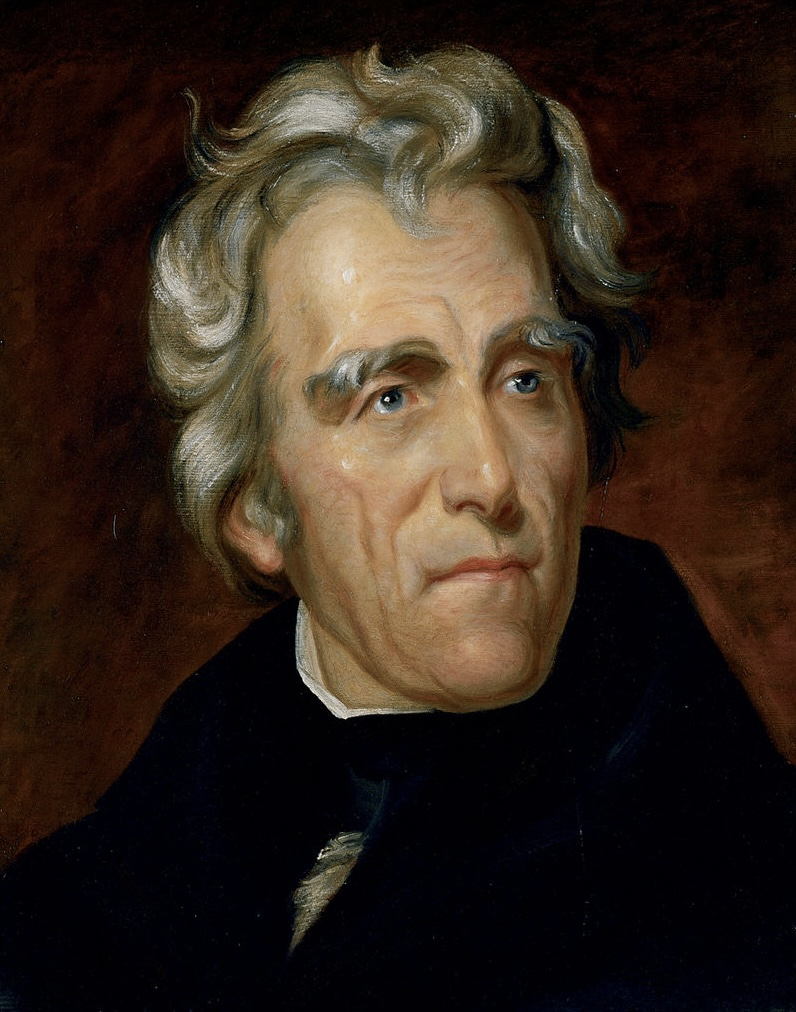
| Nominee | Andrew Jackson |
| Party | Democratic-Republican |
| Home state | Tennessee |
| Running mate | John C. Calhoun |
| Electoral vote | 11 |
| Popular vote | 20,197 |
| Percentage | 97.45% |
County results
Jackson
50–60%
60–70%
70–80%
80–90%
90–100%
Unknown/No vote
President before election
James Monroe
Democratic-Republican
Elected President
John Quincy Adams
Democratic-Republican

The 1824 United States presidential election in Tennessee took place between October 26 and December 2, 1824, as part of the 1824 United States presidential election. Voters chose 11 representatives, or electors, to the Electoral College, who voted for President and Vice President.

== Campaign ==
Henry Clay announced his campaign and received the support of leading Tennessee politicians such as John Overton, William Carroll, and Felix Grundy. Grundy, who not a member of a major faction, urged Clay to run for the presidency starting in 1821. Carroll was a member of Andrew Erwin's faction which was in ascendancy. Andrew Jackson wrote to Clay on January 16, 1822, stating that "you will get all the votes in Tennessee in preference to any man whose name has been mentioned".

Overton, whose faction was in decline, came to support Jackson in order to revive his political standing. The Nashville Gazette, the organ of Overton's faction, "took the field openly and boldly" for Jackson. Pleasant Moorman Miller, the leader of the Overton faction in the state house and a supporter of John Quincy Adams for the presidency, suggested that Jackson should run for governor in 1823. Grundy came to also support Jackson.

John Eaton and William Berkeley Lewis nominated Jackson for U.S. Senate in 1823, and he defeated incumbent U.S. Senator John Williams.

== Results ==
1824 United States presidential election in Tennessee
| Party | Candidate | Votes | Percentage | Electoral votes |
|---|---|---|---|---|
| Democratic-Republican | Andrew Jackson | 20,197 | 97.45% | 11 |
| Democratic-Republican | William H. Crawford | 312 | 1.51% | 0 |
| Democratic-Republican | John Quincy Adams | 216 | 1.04% | 0 |
| Totals | | 20,725 | 100.0% | 11 |

== See also ==
- United States presidential elections in Tennessee

== Works cited ==
- Sellers, Charles (1957). "Jackson Men with Feet of Clay". The American Historical Review. 62 (3). Oxford University Press: 537–51. doi:10.2307/1847330. JSTOR 1847330.
