= 1848 United States presidential election in Tennessee =

- November 7, 1848
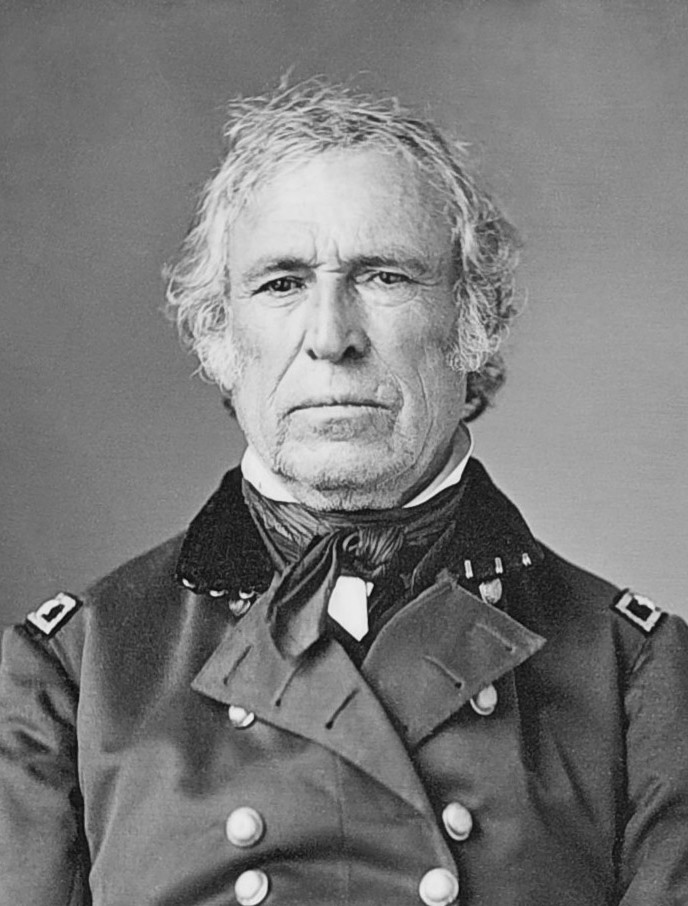

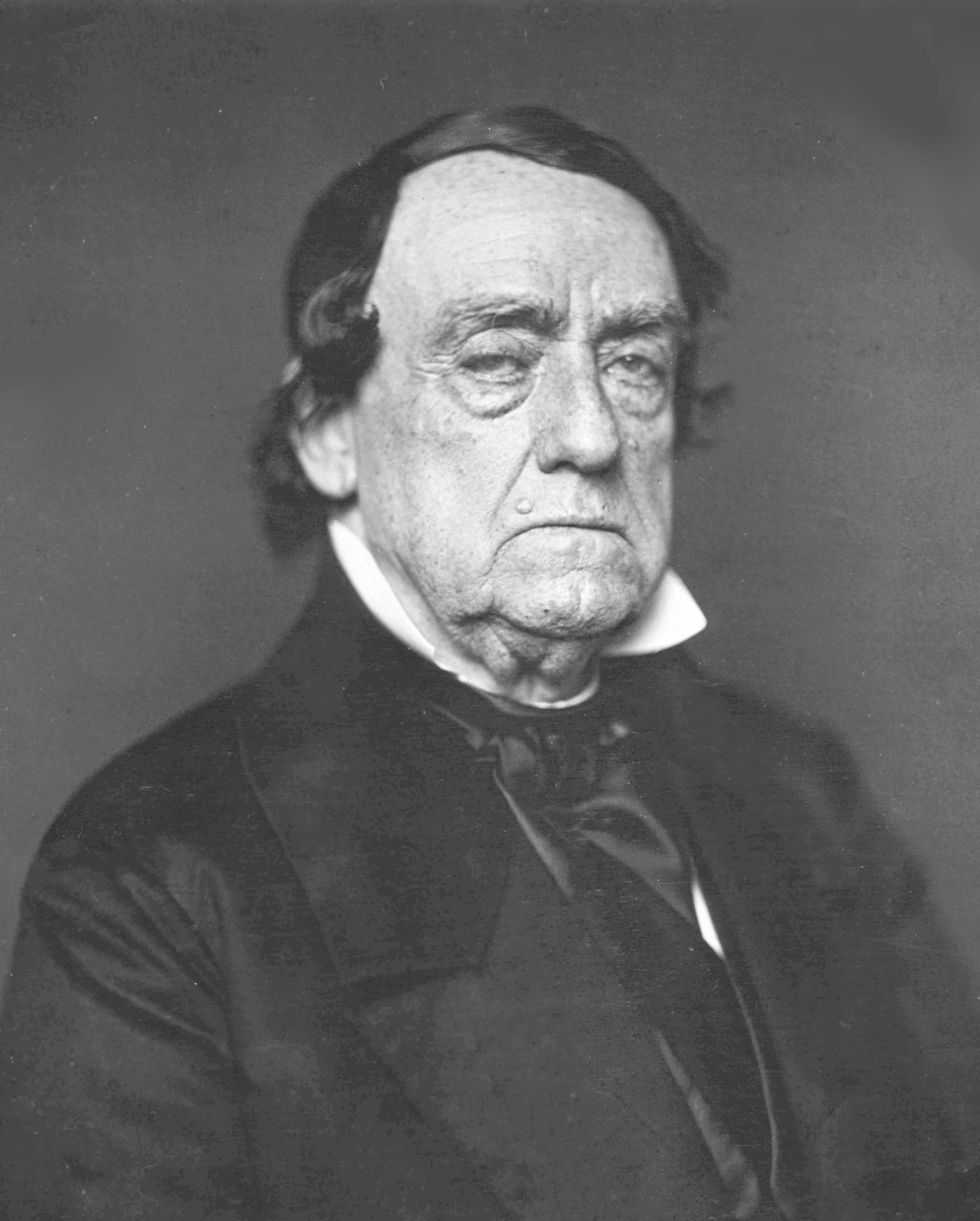
Nominee	Zachary Taylor	Lewis Cass
Party	Whig	Democratic
Home state	Louisiana	Michigan
Running mate	Millard Fillmore	William O. Butler
Electoral vote	13	0
Popular vote	64,321	58,142
Percentage	52.52%	47.48%
County results
Taylor
50–60%
60–70%
70–80%
80–90%
90–100%
Cass
50–60%
60–70%
70–80%
Unknown/No vote
President before election
James K. Polk
Democratic
Elected President
Zachary Taylor
Whig

The 1848 United States presidential election in Tennessee took place on November 7, 1848, as part of the 1848 United States presidential election. Voters chose 13 representatives, or electors to the Electoral College, who voted for President and Vice President.

Tennessee voted for the Whig candidate Zachary Taylor over Democratic candidate Lewis Cass. Taylor won Tennessee by a margin of 5.04%.

== Results ==
1848 United States presidential election in Tennessee
Party	Candidate	Running mate	Popular vote		Electoral vote	
Party	Candidate	Running mate	Count	%	Count	%
Whig	Zachary Taylor of Louisiana	Millard Fillmore of New York	64,321	52.52%	13	100.00%
Democratic	Lewis Cass of Michigan	William O. Butler of Kentucky	58,142	47.48%	0	0.00%
Total			122,463	100.00%	13	100.00%

== See also ==
- United States presidential elections in Tennessee
