= 1956 United States presidential election in Tennessee =

- November 6, 1956

Nominee	Dwight D. Eisenhower	Adlai Stevenson
Party	Republican	Democratic
Home state	Pennsylvania (Note: Although he was born in Texas and grew up in Kansas before his military career, at the time of the 1952 election Eisenhower was president of Columbia University and was, officially, a resident of New York. During his first term as president, he moved his private residence to Gettysburg, Pennsylvania, and officially changed his residency to Pennsylvania.)	Illinois
Running mate	Richard Nixon	Estes Kefauver
Electoral vote	11	0
Popular vote	462,288	456,507
Percentage	49.21%	48.60%

Eisenhower
40–50%
50–60%
60–70%
70–80%
80–90%
Stevenson
40–50%
50–60%
60–70%
70–80%
80–90%
Andrews
40–50%
President before election
Dwight D. Eisenhower
Republican
Elected President
Dwight D. Eisenhower
Republican

The 1956 United States presidential election in Tennessee took place on November 6, 1956, as part of the 1956 United States presidential election. Tennessee voters chose eleven representatives, or electors, to the Electoral College, who voted for president and vice president. Incumbent Republican Dwight D. Eisenhower narrowly carried the state over Democratic candidate Adlai Stevenson, becoming the first Republican nominee ever to carry the state more than once.

For over a century after the Civil War, Tennessee was divided according to political loyalties established in that war. Unionist regions covering almost all of East Tennessee, Kentucky Pennyroyal-allied Macon County, and the five Western Highland Rim counties of Carroll, Henderson, McNairy, Hardin, and Wayne voted Republican — generally by landslide margins — as they saw the Democratic Party as the "war party" who had forced them into a war they did not wish to fight. Contrariwise, the rest of Middle and West Tennessee who had supported and driven the state's secession was equally fiercely Democratic as it associated the Republicans with Reconstruction. After the disfranchisement of the state's African-American population by a poll tax was largely complete in the 1890s, the Democratic Party was certain of winning statewide elections if united, although unlike the Deep South Republicans would almost always gain thirty to forty percent of the statewide vote from mountain and Highland Rim support.

Between 1896 and 1948, the Republicans would win statewide contests three times but only in the second amiss the national anti-Wilson tide of 1920 did they receive down-ballot coattails by winning three congressional seats in addition to the rock-ribbed GOP First and Second Districts. After the beginning of the Great Depression, however, for the next third of a century the Republicans would rarely contest statewide offices seriously despite continuing dominance of East Tennessee and half a dozen Unionist counties in the middle and west of the state. State GOP leader B. Carroll Reece is widely believed to have had agreements with E. H. Crump and later Frank G. Clement and Buford Ellington that Republicans would not contest offices statewide or outside their traditional pro-Union areas. The Crump machine would abruptly fall in 1948 after its leader supported Dixiecrat Strom Thurmond but his own subordinates dissented knowing that a Democratic split would hand the state to the Republicans: even Crump's long-time ally Senator Kenneth D. McKellar broke with him, and a Middle Tennessee liberal, Estes Kefauver, won Tennessee's other Senate seat in 1948. In 1949, after a failed effort six years before, Tennessee would substantially modify its poll tax and entirely abolish it two years later, largely because the Crump machine had “block bought” voters’ poll taxes. Only eight years later, Kefauver would be on the ballot in Tennessee as the Democrats' candidate for vice president in this election.

== Polls ==
Source	Ranking	As of
Chattanooga Daily Times	Likely D (flip)	September 19, 1956
Spokane Chronicle	Tossup	October 16, 1956

== Results ==
1956 United States presidential election in Tennessee
Party	Candidate	Votes	%
Republican	Dwight D. Eisenhower (inc.)	462,288	49.21%
Democratic	Adlai Stevenson	456,507	48.60%
Dixiecrat	T. Coleman Andrews	19,820	2.11%
Prohibition	Enoch Holtwick	789	0.08%
Total votes		939,404	100%

=== Results by county ===
County	Dwight D. Eisenhower Republican		Adlai Stevenson Democratic		T. Coleman Andrews States’ Rights		Enoch Holtwick Prohibition		Margin		Total votes cast
County	#	%	#	%	#	%	#	%	#	%	Total votes cast
Anderson	11,071	52.42%	9,368	44.35%	682	3.23%	0	0.00%	1,703	8.07%	21,121
Bedford	2,258	33.08%	4,517	66.18%	50	0.73%	0	0.00%	-2,259	-33.10%	6,825
Benton	1,279	36.22%	2,231	63.18%	21	0.59%	0	0.00%	-952	-26.96%	3,531
Bledsoe	1,429	56.57%	1,079	42.72%	18	0.71%	0	0.00%	350	13.85%	2,526
Blount	12,667	70.90%	5,076	28.41%	113	0.63%	11	0.06%	7,591	42.49%	17,867
Bradley	6,247	65.00%	3,225	33.56%	139	1.45%	0	0.00%	3,022	31.44%	9,611
Campbell	5,065	64.78%	2,628	33.61%	126	1.61%	0	0.00%	2,437	31.17%	7,819
Cannon	919	37.13%	1,547	62.51%	9	0.36%	0	0.00%	-628	-25.38%	2,475
Carroll	4,235	55.80%	3,232	42.58%	123	1.62%	0	0.00%	1,003	13.22%	7,590
Carter	11,218	78.80%	2,933	20.60%	85	0.60%	0	0.00%	8,285	58.20%	14,236
Cheatham	498	17.72%	2,297	81.71%	11	0.39%	5	0.18%	-1,799	-63.99%	2,811
Chester	1,460	48.85%	1,495	50.02%	32	1.07%	2	0.07%	-35	-1.17%	2,989
Claiborne	3,377	62.21%	1,973	36.35%	34	0.63%	44	0.81%	1,404	25.86%	5,428
Clay	902	48.31%	948	50.78%	17	0.91%	0	0.00%	-46	-2.47%	1,867
Cocke	5,526	82.29%	1,121	16.69%	39	0.58%	29	0.43%	4,405	65.60%	6,715
Coffee	2,389	32.42%	4,930	66.90%	50	0.68%	0	0.00%	-2,541	-34.48%	7,369
Crockett	1,026	33.02%	1,964	63.21%	105	3.38%	12	0.39%	-938	-30.19%	3,107
Cumberland	3,200	62.00%	1,925	37.30%	36	0.70%	0	0.00%	1,275	24.70%	5,161
Davidson	37,077	39.08%	56,822	59.89%	975	1.03%	0	0.00%	-19,745	-20.81%	94,874
Decatur	1,512	48.76%	1,554	50.11%	35	1.13%	0	0.00%	-42	-1.35%	3,101
DeKalb	1,690	45.76%	1,982	53.67%	21	0.57%	0	0.00%	-292	-7.91%	3,693
Dickson	1,247	24.38%	3,799	74.29%	68	1.33%	0	0.00%	-2,552	-49.91%	5,114
Dyer	2,682	36.21%	4,524	61.08%	201	2.71%	0	0.00%	-1,842	-24.87%	7,407
Fayette	358	18.19%	639	32.47%	971	49.34%	0	0.00%	-332 (Note: In this county where Andrews came first with Stevenson second and Eisenhower third, margin given is Stevenson vote minus Andrews vote and percentage margin Stevenson percentage minus Andrews percentage.)	-16.87%	1,968
Fentress	2,233	69.52%	934	29.08%	30	0.93%	15	0.47%	1,299	40.44%	3,212
Franklin	1,727	26.19%	4,791	72.65%	77	1.17%	0	0.00%	-3,064	-46.46%	6,595
Gibson	3,481	29.72%	7,884	67.31%	348	2.97%	0	0.00%	-4,403	-37.59%	11,713
Giles	1,401	22.65%	4,750	76.79%	35	0.57%	0	0.00%	-3,349	-54.14%	6,186
Grainger	2,497	72.40%	913	26.47%	39	1.13%	0	0.00%	1,584	45.93%	3,449
Greene	7,396	64.87%	3,949	34.63%	57	0.50%	0	0.00%	3,447	30.24%	11,402
Grundy	918	30.36%	2,076	68.65%	23	0.76%	7	0.23%	-1,158	-38.29%	3,024
Hamblen	5,608	67.77%	2,592	31.32%	75	0.91%	0	0.00%	3,016	36.45%	8,275
Hamilton	34,429	53.11%	28,287	43.63%	2,114	3.26%	0	0.00%	6,142	9.48%	64,830
Hancock	1,939	83.29%	350	15.03%	26	1.12%	13	0.56%	1,589	68.26%	2,328
Hardeman	818	24.40%	1,754	52.31%	781	23.29%	0	0.00%	-936	-27.91%	3,353
Hardin	2,898	61.92%	1,734	37.05%	48	1.03%	0	0.00%	1,164	24.87%	4,680
Hawkins	6,916	68.04%	3,180	31.29%	37	0.36%	31	0.30%	3,736	36.75%	10,164
Haywood	516	17.04%	2,217	73.22%	295	9.74%	0	0.00%	-1,701	-56.18%	3,028
Henderson	3,294	66.91%	1,613	32.76%	16	0.33%	0	0.00%	1,681	34.15%	4,923
Henry	2,337	28.97%	5,625	69.72%	106	1.31%	0	0.00%	-3,288	-40.75%	8,068
Hickman	1,040	29.75%	2,439	69.77%	11	0.31%	6	0.17%	-1,399	-40.02%	3,496
Houston	340	24.55%	1,033	74.58%	8	0.58%	4	0.29%	-693	-50.03%	1,385
Humphreys	713	19.99%	2,841	79.67%	12	0.34%	0	0.00%	-2,128	-59.68%	3,566
Jackson	881	33.13%	1,743	65.55%	35	1.32%	0	0.00%	-862	-32.42%	2,659
Jefferson	4,870	77.63%	1,338	21.33%	65	1.04%	0	0.00%	3,532	56.30%	6,273
Johnson	3,690	87.44%	503	11.92%	27	0.64%	0	0.00%	3,187	75.52%	4,220
Knox	46,167	60.09%	29,768	38.74%	800	1.04%	96	0.12%	16,399	21.35%	76,831
Lake	512	22.80%	1,673	74.49%	61	2.72%	0	0.00%	-1,161	-51.69%	2,246
Lauderdale	1,049	18.94%	4,383	79.12%	108	1.95%	0	0.00%	-3,334	-60.18%	5,540
Lawrence	4,588	51.67%	4,227	47.60%	44	0.50%	21	0.24%	361	4.07%	8,880
Lewis	522	28.16%	1,321	71.25%	11	0.59%	0	0.00%	-799	-43.09%	1,854
Lincoln	1,207	21.21%	4,434	77.90%	51	0.90%	0	0.00%	-3,227	-56.69%	5,692
Loudon	4,583	60.91%	2,844	37.80%	75	1.00%	22	0.29%	1,739	23.11%	7,524
Macon	2,207	66.96%	1,069	32.43%	20	0.61%	0	0.00%	1,138	34.53%	3,296
Madison	6,642	41.42%	8,540	53.25%	810	5.05%	45	0.28%	-1,898	-11.83%	16,037
Marion	2,925	50.45%	2,781	47.96%	92	1.59%	0	0.00%	144	2.49%	5,798
Marshall	1,527	26.58%	4,100	71.37%	94	1.64%	24	0.42%	-2,573	-44.79%	5,745
Maury	2,853	29.39%	6,662	68.64%	191	1.97%	0	0.00%	-3,809	-39.25%	9,706
McMinn	6,075	59.83%	3,950	38.90%	93	0.92%	35	0.34%	2,125	20.93%	10,153
McNairy	3,349	57.37%	2,403	41.16%	86	1.47%	0	0.00%	946	16.21%	5,838
Meigs	847	51.93%	759	46.54%	21	1.29%	4	0.25%	88	5.39%	1,631
Monroe	4,998	58.28%	3,511	40.94%	55	0.64%	12	0.14%	1,487	17.34%	8,576
Montgomery	2,778	25.41%	8,034	73.48%	122	1.12%	0	0.00%	-5,256	-48.07%	10,934
Moore	270	23.14%	893	76.52%	4	0.34%	0	0.00%	-623	-53.38%	1,167
Morgan	2,402	62.83%	1,379	36.07%	42	1.10%	0	0.00%	1,023	26.76%	3,823
Obion	2,349	30.76%	5,185	67.89%	103	1.35%	0	0.00%	-2,836	-37.13%	7,637
Overton	1,508	38.44%	2,385	60.80%	15	0.38%	15	0.38%	-877	-22.36%	3,923
Perry	694	39.43%	1,052	59.77%	14	0.80%	0	0.00%	-358	-20.34%	1,760
Pickett	985	63.30%	560	35.99%	11	0.71%	0	0.00%	425	27.31%	1,556
Polk	2,136	58.22%	1,533	41.78%	0	0.00%	0	0.00%	603	16.44%	3,669
Putnam	3,492	43.63%	4,481	55.98%	31	0.39%	0	0.00%	-989	-12.35%	8,004
Rhea	2,516	55.70%	1,930	42.73%	71	1.57%	0	0.00%	586	12.97%	4,517
Roane	6,147	56.82%	4,531	41.88%	131	1.21%	9	0.08%	1,616	14.94%	10,818
Robertson	1,517	23.25%	4,961	76.02%	34	0.52%	14	0.21%	-3,444	-52.77%	6,526
Rutherford	2,713	29.15%	6,494	69.78%	99	1.06%	0	0.00%	-3,781	-40.63%	9,306
Scott	3,282	79.10%	842	20.29%	25	0.60%	0	0.00%	2,440	58.81%	4,149
Sequatchie	683	43.89%	859	55.21%	14	0.90%	0	0.00%	-176	-11.32%	1,556
Sevier	6,950	86.46%	1,043	12.98%	40	0.50%	5	0.06%	5,907	73.48%	8,038
Shelby	65,690	48.65%	62,051	45.96%	7,284	5.39%	0	0.00%	3,639	2.69%	135,025
Smith	1,267	29.96%	2,949	69.73%	8	0.19%	5	0.12%	-1,682	-39.77%	4,229
Stewart	560	20.77%	2,120	78.64%	16	0.59%	0	0.00%	-1,560	-57.87%	2,696
Sullivan	18,903	56.42%	14,106	42.10%	206	0.61%	291	0.87%	4,797	14.32%	33,506
Sumner	2,123	22.28%	7,368	77.34%	36	0.38%	0	0.00%	-5,245	-55.06%	9,527
Tipton	983	16.26%	4,828	79.87%	234	3.87%	0	0.00%	-3,845	-63.61%	6,045
Trousdale	209	16.76%	1,032	82.76%	6	0.48%	0	0.00%	-823	-66.00%	1,247
Unicoi	3,978	77.71%	1,111	21.70%	30	0.59%	0	0.00%	2,867	56.01%	5,119
Union	2,154	79.69%	535	19.79%	14	0.52%	0	0.00%	1,619	59.90%	2,703
Van Buren	381	38.45%	602	60.75%	8	0.81%	0	0.00%	-221	-22.30%	991
Warren	1,954	32.58%	4,014	66.92%	30	0.50%	0	0.00%	-2,060	-34.34%	5,998
Washington	13,471	71.23%	5,314	28.10%	127	0.67%	0	0.00%	8,157	43.13%	18,912
Wayne	2,557	70.67%	1,045	28.88%	16	0.44%	0	0.00%	1,512	41.79%	3,618
Weakley	2,720	36.22%	4,717	62.81%	61	0.81%	12	0.16%	-1,997	-26.59%	7,510
White	1,346	35.81%	2,378	63.26%	35	0.93%	0	0.00%	-1,032	-27.45%	3,759
Williamson	1,979	31.86%	4,174	67.20%	58	0.93%	0	0.00%	-2,195	-35.34%	6,211
Wilson	2,266	30.04%	5,221	69.21%	57	0.76%	0	0.00%	-2,955	-39.17%	7,544
Totals	462,288	49.21%	456,507	48.60%	19,820	2.11%	789	0.08%	5,781	0.61%	939,404

==== Counties that flipped from Democratic to Republican ====
- Marion
- Shelby

==== Counties that flipped from Republican to Democratic ====
- Chester

==== Counties that flipped from Democratic to Unpledged ====
- Fayette

== Analysis ==
In 1952, Dwight D. Eisenhower, aided by acquisition of 1948 Dixiecrat votes in West Tennessee cotton counties, would carry the state for the Republicans by an 0.28 percent margin. Unlike in 1952, neither Eisenhower nor Stevenson visited the state. For the 1956 presidential election, Senator Kefauver would seek the presidential nomination but was ultimately chosen by second-time Democratic nominee Adlai Stevenson II as his running mate. Despite some campaigners writing the state off for the GOP, Tennessee was won by Eisenhower with 49.21 percent of the popular vote, against Stevenson's 48.60 percent. This was a slight increase upon Eisenhower’s 1952 margin, due entirely to large gains from 1952 amongst the substantial black electorate of Memphis.
