= 1992 United States presidential election in Tennessee =

- November 3, 1992

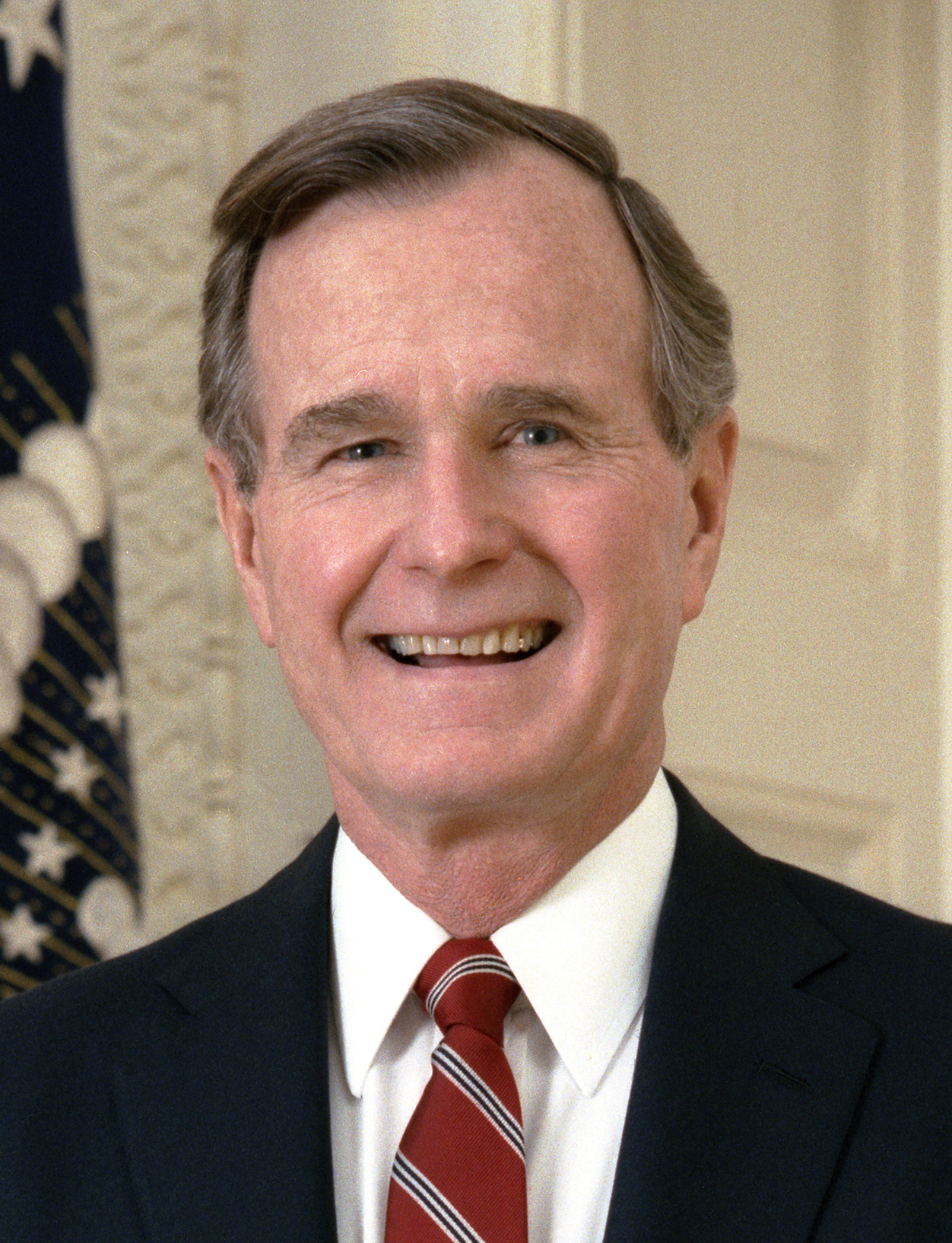

| Nominee | Bill Clinton | George H. W. Bush | Ross Perot |
| Party | Democratic | Republican | Independent |
| Home state | Arkansas | Texas | Texas |
| Running mate | Al Gore | Dan Quayle | James Stockdale |
| Electoral vote | 11 | 0 | 0 |
| Popular vote | 933,521 | 841,300 | 199,968 |
| Percentage | 47.08% | 42.43% | 10.09% |

Clinton
40–50%
50–60%
60–70%
70–80%
Bush
40–50%
50–60%
President before election
George H. W. Bush
Republican
Elected President
Bill Clinton
Democratic

The 1992 United States presidential election in Tennessee took place on November 3, 1992, as part of the 1992 United States presidential election. Voters chose 11 representatives, or electors to the Electoral College, who voted for president and vice president.

Tennessee was won by Governor Bill Clinton (D-Arkansas) with 47.08% of the popular vote over incumbent President George H. W. Bush (R-Texas) with 42.43%. Businessman Ross Perot (I-Texas) finished in third, with 10.09% of the popular vote. Clinton ultimately won the national vote, defeating incumbent President Bush and Perot.

Clinton, from neighboring Arkansas, benefited from having the state's junior U.S. Senator Al Gore as his vice presidential running mate. As of the 2024 presidential election, this is the last election in which Rutherford County, Sumner County, Wilson County, Lincoln County, Claiborne County, Hardin County, Macon County, Bledsoe County, and Pickett County voted for a Democratic presidential candidate.

== Background ==
Leading up to the 1992 election, The Republican presidential nominee had won Tennessee in every presidential election since 1968 except for Democratic nominee Jimmy Carter's victory in 1976.

== Primary elections ==
=== Democratic ===
Paul Tsongas stated that he was only seeking a strong second-place result as he was campaigning in Bill Clinton's region. Jeff Clark, the director of Bob Kerrey's campaign in the state, criticized Democratic officials in the state for almost entirely endorsing Clinton, but Clark later endorsed Clinton himself.

Clinton selected Al Gore, one of Tennessee's two U.S. Senators, as his running mate.

=== Republican ===
Pat Buchanan only visited Tennessee once during the primary while George H. W. Bush and Dan Quayle conducted a combined five visits.

== General election ==
The Democrats won their biggest majority since 1976 in the concurrent Tennessee House of Representatives elections.

=== Results ===
1992 United States presidential election in Tennessee
| Party | Candidate | Votes | Percentage | Electoral votes |
|---|---|---|---|---|
| Democratic | Bill Clinton | 933,521 | 47.08% | 11 |
| Republican | George H. W. Bush (incumbent) | 841,300 | 42.43% | 0 |
| Independent | Ross Perot | 199,968 | 10.09% | 0 |
| Independent | Andre Marrou | 1,847 | 0.09% | 0 |
| Independent | J. Quinn Brisben | 1,356 | 0.07% | 0 |
| Independent | James "Bo" Gritz | 756 | 0.04% | 0 |
| Independent | Lenora Fulani | 727 | 0.04% | 0 |
| Independent | Dr. John Hagelin | 599 | 0.03% | 0 |
| Independent | Howard Phillips | 579 | 0.03% | 0 |
| Independent | Ron Daniels | 511 | 0.03% | 0 |
| Independent | Lyndon LaRouche | 460 | 0.02% | 0 |
| Independent | Earl Dodge | 343 | 0.02% | 0 |
| Independent | James Warren | 277 | 0.01% | 0 |
| Independent | John Yiamouyiannis | 233 | 0.01% | 0 |
| Write-ins | | 161 | 0.01% | 0 |
| Totals | | 1,982,638 | 100.00% | 11 |

=== Results by county ===
| County | Bill Clinton Democratic | | George H. W. Bush Republican | | Ross Perot Independent | | Various candidates Independent | | Margin | | Total votes cast |
| County | # | % | # | % | # | % | # | % | # | % | Total votes cast |
|---|---|---|---|---|---|---|---|---|---|---|---|
| Anderson | 13,482 | 47.12% | 11,838 | 41.38% | 3,149 | 11.01% | 142 | 0.50% | 1,644 | 5.74% | 28,611 |
| Bedford | 5,978 | 52.34% | 3,836 | 33.59% | 1,541 | 13.49% | 66 | 0.58% | 2,142 | 18.75% | 11,421 |
| Benton | 3,896 | 63.72% | 1,625 | 26.58% | 559 | 9.14% | 34 | 0.56% | 2,271 | 37.14% | 6,114 |
| Bledsoe | 1,884 | 46.89% | 1,776 | 44.20% | 352 | 8.76% | 6 | 0.15% | 108 | 2.69% | 4,018 |
| Blount | 14,655 | 38.92% | 18,415 | 48.91% | 4,468 | 11.87% | 113 | 0.30% | -3,760 | -9.99% | 37,651 |
| Bradley | 9,889 | 33.30% | 16,528 | 55.66% | 3,212 | 10.82% | 67 | 0.23% | -6,639 | -22.36% | 29,696 |
| Campbell | 6,756 | 52.25% | 4,897 | 37.87% | 1,240 | 9.59% | 38 | 0.29% | 1,859 | 14.38% | 12,931 |
| Cannon | 2,593 | 59.87% | 1,229 | 28.38% | 495 | 11.43% | 14 | 0.32% | 1,364 | 31.49% | 4,331 |
| Carroll | 5,741 | 48.66% | 4,842 | 41.04% | 1,139 | 9.65% | 77 | 0.65% | 899 | 7.62% | 11,799 |
| Carter | 6,502 | 33.88% | 10,712 | 55.82% | 1,898 | 9.89% | 78 | 0.41% | -4,210 | -21.94% | 19,190 |
| Cheatham | 4,817 | 49.21% | 3,496 | 35.72% | 1,433 | 14.64% | 42 | 0.43% | 1,321 | 13.49% | 9,788 |
| Chester | 2,317 | 41.40% | 2,834 | 50.64% | 439 | 7.84% | 6 | 0.11% | -517 | -9.24% | 5,596 |
| Claiborne | 4,509 | 47.54% | 4,065 | 42.86% | 860 | 9.07% | 51 | 0.54% | 444 | 4.68% | 9,485 |
| Clay | 1,922 | 59.58% | 1,072 | 33.23% | 223 | 6.91% | 9 | 0.28% | 850 | 26.35% | 3,226 |
| Cocke | 3,495 | 34.95% | 5,298 | 52.98% | 1,124 | 11.24% | 83 | 0.83% | -1,803 | -18.03% | 10,000 |
| Coffee | 8,534 | 50.07% | 6,047 | 35.48% | 2,420 | 14.20% | 43 | 0.25% | 2,487 | 14.59% | 17,044 |
| Crockett | 2,657 | 49.60% | 2,180 | 40.69% | 507 | 9.46% | 13 | 0.24% | 477 | 8.91% | 5,357 |
| Cumberland | 6,393 | 40.48% | 7,116 | 45.06% | 2,200 | 13.93% | 83 | 0.53% | -723 | -4.58% | 15,792 |
| Davidson | 106,355 | 52.18% | 76,567 | 37.57% | 20,184 | 9.90% | 701 | 0.34% | 29,788 | 14.61% | 203,807 |
| Decatur | 2,633 | 56.49% | 1,667 | 35.76% | 351 | 7.53% | 10 | 0.21% | 966 | 20.73% | 4,661 |
| DeKalb | 4,382 | 65.19% | 1,714 | 25.50% | 608 | 9.04% | 18 | 0.27% | 2,668 | 39.69% | 6,722 |
| Dickson | 7,863 | 55.79% | 4,450 | 31.58% | 1,730 | 12.28% | 50 | 0.35% | 3,413 | 24.21% | 14,093 |
| Dyer | 5,845 | 45.71% | 5,668 | 44.33% | 1,241 | 9.71% | 33 | 0.26% | 177 | 1.38% | 12,787 |
| Fayette | 4,211 | 48.91% | 3,713 | 43.13% | 657 | 7.63% | 28 | 0.33% | 498 | 5.78% | 8,609 |
| Fentress | 2,730 | 47.40% | 2,391 | 41.52% | 606 | 10.52% | 32 | 0.56% | 339 | 5.88% | 5,759 |
| Franklin | 7,773 | 54.83% | 4,507 | 31.79% | 1,837 | 12.96% | 59 | 0.42% | 3,266 | 23.04% | 14,176 |
| Gibson | 9,555 | 52.12% | 7,161 | 39.06% | 1,536 | 8.38% | 80 | 0.44% | 2,394 | 13.06% | 18,332 |
| Giles | 5,601 | 57.26% | 2,827 | 28.90% | 1,309 | 13.38% | 44 | 0.45% | 2,774 | 28.36% | 9,781 |
| Grainger | 2,242 | 40.37% | 2,772 | 49.92% | 513 | 9.24% | 26 | 0.47% | -530 | -9.55% | 5,553 |
| Greene | 7,857 | 37.64% | 9,912 | 47.48% | 2,930 | 14.04% | 176 | 0.84% | -2,055 | -9.84% | 20,875 |
| Grundy | 2,997 | 68.33% | 1,004 | 22.89% | 366 | 8.34% | 19 | 0.43% | 1,993 | 45.44% | 4,386 |
| Hamblen | 7,114 | 39.85% | 8,898 | 49.84% | 1,760 | 9.86% | 82 | 0.46% | -1,784 | -9.99% | 17,854 |
| Hamilton | 46,770 | 40.64% | 53,476 | 46.47% | 14,400 | 12.51% | 439 | 0.38% | -6,706 | -5.83% | 115,085 |
| Hancock | 1,000 | 40.83% | 1,274 | 52.02% | 151 | 6.17% | 24 | 0.98% | -274 | -11.19% | 2,449 |
| Hardeman | 4,832 | 56.01% | 3,122 | 36.19% | 594 | 6.89% | 79 | 0.92% | 1,710 | 19.82% | 8,627 |
| Hardin | 3,922 | 45.65% | 3,875 | 45.10% | 734 | 8.54% | 61 | 0.71% | 47 | 0.55% | 8,592 |
| Hawkins | 6,623 | 40.67% | 7,758 | 47.64% | 1,847 | 11.34% | 57 | 0.35% | -1,135 | -6.97% | 16,285 |
| Haywood | 3,511 | 55.07% | 2,518 | 39.49% | 331 | 5.19% | 16 | 0.25% | 993 | 15.58% | 6,376 |
| Henderson | 3,502 | 38.81% | 4,719 | 52.29% | 785 | 8.70% | 18 | 0.20% | -1,217 | -13.48% | 9,024 |
| Henry | 6,797 | 56.20% | 3,661 | 30.27% | 1,588 | 13.13% | 49 | 0.41% | 3,136 | 25.93% | 12,095 |
| Hickman | 4,093 | 60.84% | 1,820 | 27.06% | 795 | 11.82% | 19 | 0.28% | 2,273 | 33.78% | 6,727 |
| Houston | 2,012 | 68.18% | 648 | 21.96% | 280 | 9.49% | 11 | 0.37% | 1,364 | 46.22% | 2,951 |
| Humphreys | 3,875 | 63.16% | 1,641 | 26.75% | 609 | 9.93% | 10 | 0.16% | 2,234 | 36.41% | 6,135 |
| Jackson | 3,208 | 75.34% | 708 | 16.63% | 332 | 7.80% | 10 | 0.23% | 2,500 | 58.71% | 4,258 |
| Jefferson | 4,740 | 38.34% | 6,184 | 50.02% | 1,385 | 11.20% | 53 | 0.43% | -1,444 | -11.68% | 12,362 |
| Johnson | 1,781 | 32.02% | 3,170 | 56.98% | 574 | 10.32% | 38 | 0.68% | -1,389 | -24.96% | 5,563 |
| Knox | 59,702 | 41.90% | 66,607 | 46.75% | 15,669 | 11.00% | 498 | 0.35% | -6,905 | -4.85% | 142,476 |
| Lake | 1,449 | 62.84% | 680 | 29.49% | 151 | 6.55% | 26 | 1.13% | 769 | 33.35% | 2,306 |
| Lauderdale | 4,452 | 55.94% | 2,928 | 36.79% | 561 | 7.05% | 17 | 0.21% | 1,524 | 19.15% | 7,958 |
| Lawrence | 6,816 | 49.16% | 5,608 | 40.45% | 1,403 | 10.12% | 37 | 0.27% | 1,208 | 8.71% | 13,864 |
| Lewis | 2,491 | 60.00% | 1,218 | 29.34% | 434 | 10.45% | 9 | 0.22% | 1,273 | 30.66% | 4,152 |
| Lincoln | 5,063 | 49.15% | 3,814 | 37.02% | 1,371 | 13.31% | 54 | 0.52% | 1,249 | 12.13% | 10,302 |
| Loudon | 5,414 | 40.07% | 6,444 | 47.70% | 1,602 | 11.86% | 50 | 0.37% | -1,030 | -7.63% | 13,510 |
| Macon | 2,961 | 51.71% | 2,299 | 40.15% | 443 | 7.74% | 23 | 0.40% | 662 | 11.56% | 5,726 |
| Madison | 13,629 | 43.69% | 14,869 | 47.66% | 2,634 | 8.44% | 64 | 0.21% | -1,240 | -3.97% | 31,196 |
| Marion | 5,589 | 55.51% | 3,262 | 32.40% | 1,186 | 11.78% | 31 | 0.31% | 2,327 | 23.11% | 10,068 |
| Marshall | 4,491 | 55.46% | 2,516 | 31.07% | 1,050 | 12.97% | 41 | 0.51% | 1,975 | 24.39% | 8,098 |
| Maury | 9,997 | 48.86% | 7,440 | 36.37% | 2,821 | 13.79% | 201 | 0.98% | 2,557 | 12.49% | 20,459 |
| McMinn | 6,682 | 41.79% | 7,453 | 46.61% | 1,812 | 11.33% | 43 | 0.27% | -771 | -4.82% | 15,990 |
| McNairy | 4,691 | 48.89% | 4,093 | 42.66% | 774 | 8.07% | 37 | 0.39% | 598 | 6.23% | 9,595 |
| Meigs | 1,673 | 48.02% | 1,355 | 38.89% | 453 | 13.00% | 3 | 0.09% | 318 | 9.13% | 3,484 |
| Monroe | 5,384 | 43.38% | 6,025 | 48.55% | 936 | 7.54% | 66 | 0.53% | -641 | -5.17% | 12,411 |
| Montgomery | 14,507 | 46.29% | 13,011 | 41.51% | 3,753 | 11.97% | 70 | 0.22% | 1,496 | 4.78% | 31,341 |
| Moore | 1,151 | 53.66% | 661 | 30.82% | 327 | 15.24% | 6 | 0.28% | 490 | 22.84% | 2,145 |
| Morgan | 3,190 | 51.58% | 2,306 | 37.29% | 658 | 10.64% | 30 | 0.49% | 884 | 14.29% | 6,184 |
| Obion | 6,497 | 50.51% | 4,812 | 37.41% | 1,494 | 11.61% | 61 | 0.47% | 1,685 | 13.10% | 12,864 |
| Overton | 4,489 | 67.49% | 1,657 | 24.91% | 468 | 7.04% | 37 | 0.56% | 2,832 | 42.58% | 6,651 |
| Perry | 1,889 | 64.71% | 708 | 24.25% | 317 | 10.86% | 5 | 0.17% | 1,181 | 40.46% | 2,919 |
| Pickett | 1,144 | 48.31% | 1,094 | 46.20% | 121 | 5.11% | 9 | 0.38% | 50 | 2.11% | 2,368 |
| Polk | 2,583 | 56.03% | 1,584 | 34.36% | 419 | 9.09% | 24 | 0.52% | 999 | 21.67% | 4,610 |
| Putnam | 10,858 | 50.54% | 7,998 | 37.23% | 2,473 | 11.51% | 153 | 0.71% | 2,860 | 13.31% | 21,482 |
| Rhea | 4,289 | 41.45% | 4,860 | 46.97% | 1,163 | 11.24% | 36 | 0.35% | -571 | -5.52% | 10,348 |
| Roane | 9,812 | 46.73% | 8,719 | 41.52% | 2,396 | 11.41% | 72 | 0.34% | 1,093 | 5.21% | 20,999 |
| Robertson | 8,498 | 53.86% | 5,271 | 33.41% | 1,978 | 12.54% | 32 | 0.20% | 3,227 | 20.45% | 15,779 |
| Rutherford | 21,084 | 44.73% | 18,877 | 40.04% | 7,005 | 14.86% | 174 | 0.37% | 2,207 | 4.69% | 47,140 |
| Scott | 2,730 | 42.54% | 3,011 | 46.91% | 643 | 10.02% | 34 | 0.53% | -281 | -4.37% | 6,418 |
| Sequatchie | 1,754 | 49.28% | 1,381 | 38.80% | 405 | 11.38% | 19 | 0.53% | 373 | 10.48% | 3,559 |
| Sevier | 6,719 | 31.60% | 11,714 | 55.08% | 2,760 | 12.98% | 73 | 0.34% | -4,995 | -23.48% | 21,266 |
| Shelby | 191,322 | 52.26% | 153,310 | 41.88% | 20,223 | 5.52% | 1,255 | 0.34% | 38,012 | 10.38% | 366,110 |
| Smith | 5,061 | 71.85% | 1,482 | 21.04% | 486 | 6.90% | 15 | 0.21% | 3,579 | 50.81% | 7,044 |
| Stewart | 2,779 | 64.28% | 1,046 | 24.20% | 487 | 11.27% | 11 | 0.25% | 1,733 | 40.08% | 4,323 |
| Sullivan | 20,935 | 36.74% | 28,801 | 50.55% | 6,730 | 11.81% | 514 | 0.90% | -7,866 | -13.81% | 56,980 |
| Sumner | 19,387 | 46.01% | 17,401 | 41.30% | 5,177 | 12.29% | 167 | 0.40% | 1,986 | 4.71% | 42,132 |
| Tipton | 5,652 | 41.20% | 6,757 | 49.26% | 1,279 | 9.32% | 29 | 0.21% | -1,105 | -8.06% | 13,717 |
| Trousdale | 1,846 | 69.29% | 565 | 21.21% | 243 | 9.12% | 10 | 0.38% | 1,281 | 48.08% | 2,664 |
| Unicoi | 2,375 | 36.84% | 3,344 | 51.87% | 709 | 11.00% | 19 | 0.29% | -969 | -15.03% | 6,447 |
| Union | 2,478 | 46.28% | 2,274 | 42.47% | 580 | 10.83% | 22 | 0.41% | 204 | 3.81% | 5,354 |
| Van Buren | 1,329 | 63.89% | 555 | 26.68% | 191 | 9.18% | 5 | 0.24% | 774 | 37.21% | 2,080 |
| Warren | 7,189 | 58.19% | 3,704 | 29.98% | 1,415 | 11.45% | 47 | 0.38% | 3,485 | 28.21% | 12,355 |
| Washington | 13,071 | 36.84% | 18,206 | 51.31% | 4,002 | 11.28% | 204 | 0.57% | -5,135 | -14.47% | 35,483 |
| Wayne | 1,868 | 35.47% | 2,955 | 56.11% | 424 | 8.05% | 19 | 0.36% | -1,087 | -20.64% | 5,266 |
| Weakley | 5,691 | 47.95% | 4,800 | 40.44% | 1,355 | 11.42% | 23 | 0.19% | 891 | 7.51% | 11,869 |
| White | 4,102 | 57.99% | 2,118 | 29.94% | 821 | 11.61% | 33 | 0.47% | 1,984 | 28.05% | 7,074 |
| Williamson | 13,053 | 32.47% | 22,015 | 54.77% | 5,026 | 12.50% | 101 | 0.25% | -8,962 | -22.30% | 40,195 |
| Wilson | 13,861 | 46.35% | 12,061 | 40.33% | 3,848 | 12.87% | 133 | 0.44% | 1,800 | 6.02% | 29,903 |
| Totals | 933,521 | 47.08% | 841,300 | 42.43% | 199,968 | 10.09% | 7,849 | 0.40% | 92,221 | 4.65% | 1,982,638 |

==== Counties that flipped from Republican to Democratic ====
- Anderson
- Bedford
- Bledsoe
- Campbell
- Carroll
- Cheatham
- Claiborne
- Clay
- Coffee
- Crockett
- Davidson
- Decatur
- Dickson
- Dyer
- Fayette
- Fentress
- Gibson
- Hardeman
- Hardin
- Lauderdale
- Lawrence
- Lincoln
- Macon
- Marion
- Marshall
- Maury
- McNairy
- Meigs
- Montgomery
- Moore
- Morgan
- Obion
- Pickett
- Polk
- Putnam
- Roane
- Rutherford
- Sequatchie
- Shelby
- Sumner
- Union
- Weakley
- White
- Wilson

== See also ==
- 1992 United States House of Representatives elections in Tennessee
- Presidency of Bill Clinton

== Works cited ==
- Moreland, Laurence; Steed, Robert; Baker, Tod, eds. (1991). The 1988 Presidential Election in the South: Continuity Amidst Change in Southern Party Politics. Praeger Publishers. ISBN 0275931455.
- Steed, Robert; Moreland, Laurence; Baker, Tod, eds. (1994). The 1992 Presidential Election in the South: Current Patterns of Southern Party and Electoral Politics. Praeger Publishers. ISBN 0275945340.
