= 1832 United States presidential election in Tennessee =

- November 2 – December 5, 1832
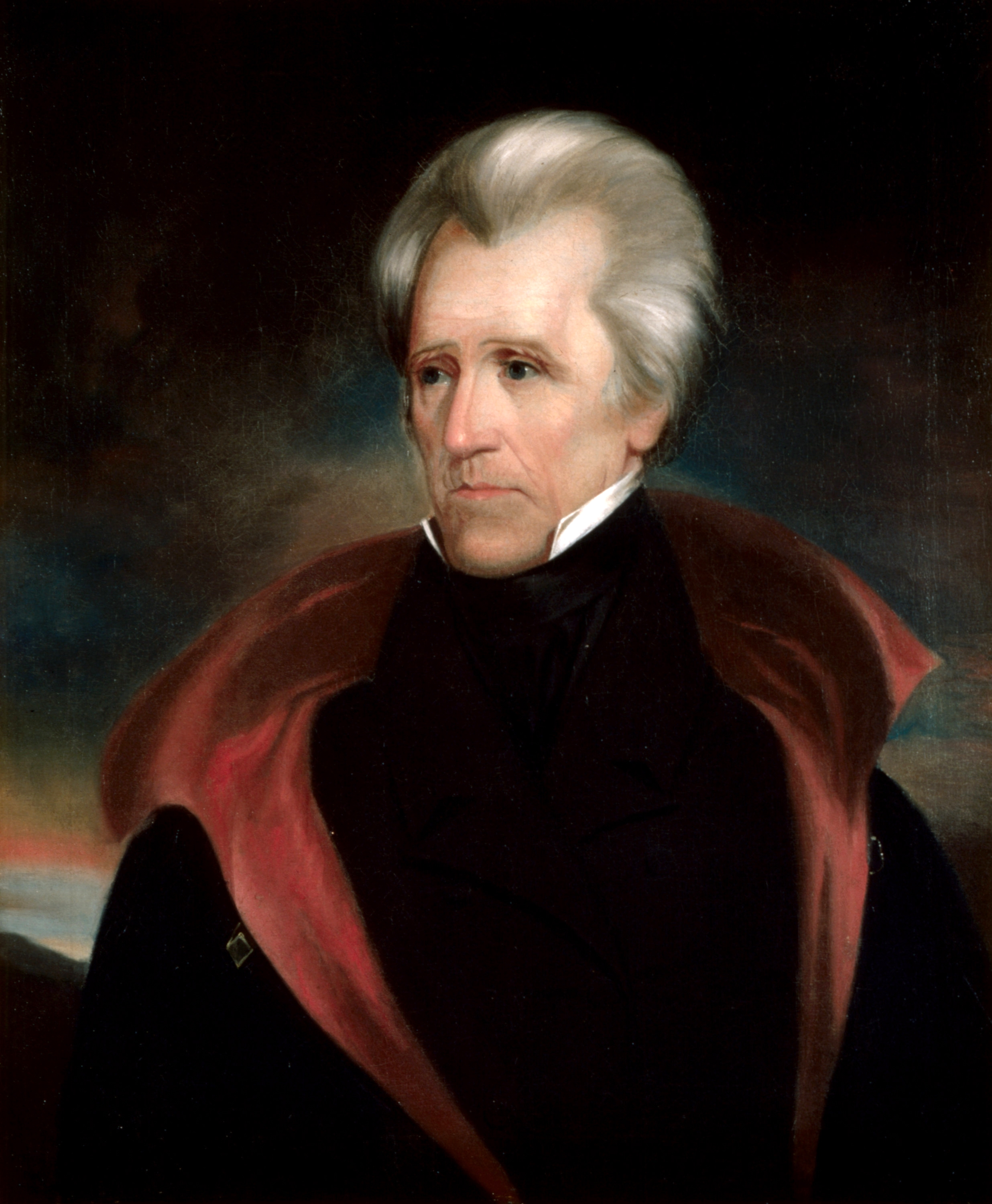

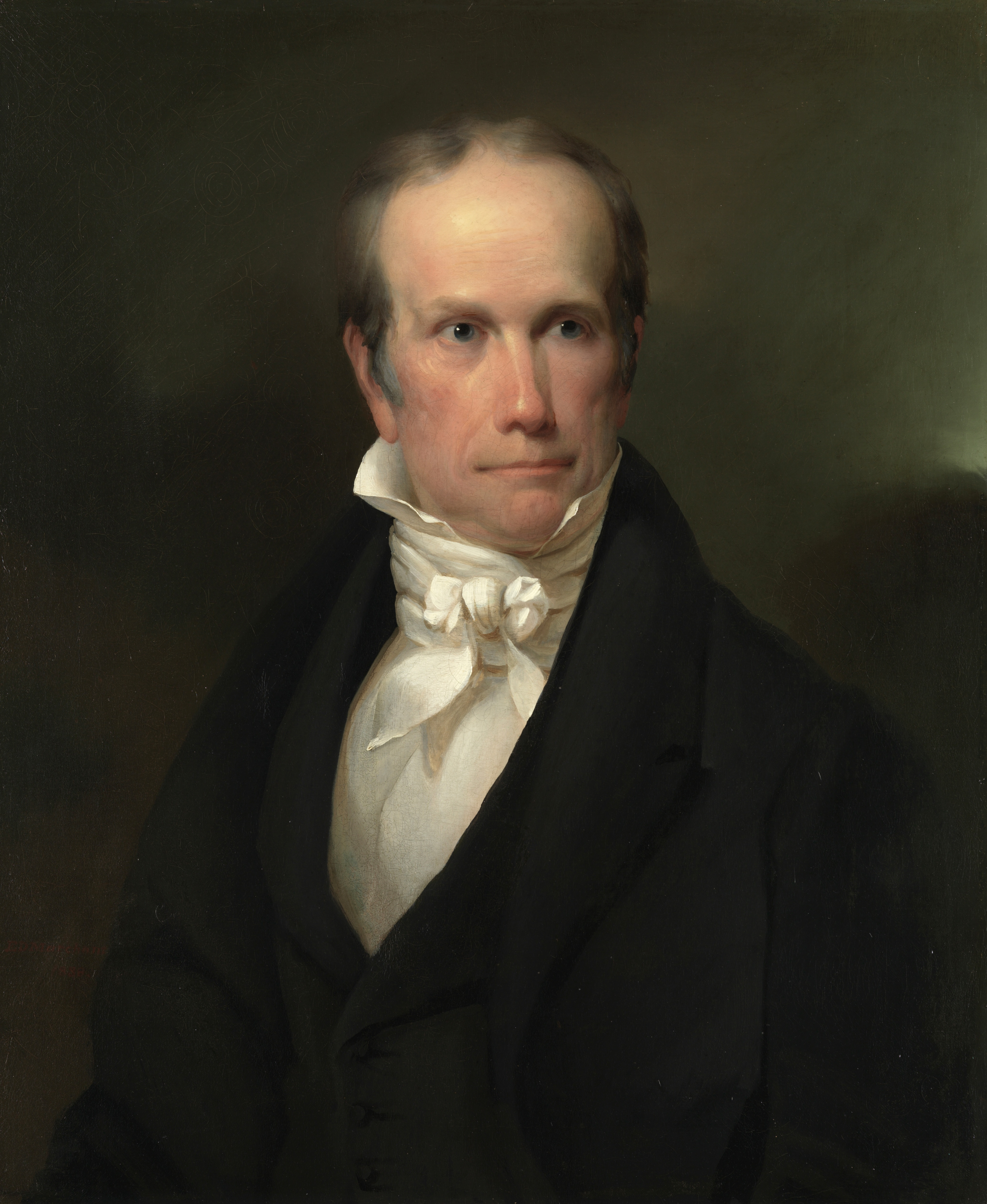
Nominee	Andrew Jackson	Henry Clay
Party	Democratic	National Republican
Home state	Tennessee	Kentucky
Running mate	Martin Van Buren	John Sergeant
Electoral vote	15	0
Popular vote	28,078	1,347
Percentage	95.42%	4.58%
County results
Jackson
60–70%
80–90%
90–100%
Clay
50–60%
Precinct before election
Andrew Jackson
Democratic
Elected Precinct
Andrew Jackson
Democratic

The 1832 United States presidential election in Tennessee took place between November 2 and December 5, 1832, as part of the 1832 United States presidential election. Voters chose 15 representatives, or electors to the Electoral College, who voted for President and Vice President.

Tennessee voted for the Democratic Party candidate, state native Andrew Jackson, over the National Republican candidate, Henry Clay. Jackson won Tennessee by a large margin of 90.84%. This is the most recent election in which Blount County, Carter County, Cocke County, Grainger County, Jefferson County, and Sevier County voted for a Democratic presidential candidate on a presidential level.

== Results ==
1832 United States presidential election in Tennessee
Party	Candidate	Votes	Percentage	Electoral votes
Democratic	Andrew Jackson (incumbent)	28,078	95.42%	15
National Republican	Henry Clay	1,347	4.58%	0
Totals		29,425	100.00%	15

== See also ==
- United States presidential elections in Tennessee
