= 1864 United States presidential election =

Re-election of Abraham Lincoln

- November 8, 1864

234 members (Note: 234 electors were permitted to cast votes; however, an elector from Nevada pledged to the Lincoln/Johnson ticket was snowbound and unable to cast a vote for President or Vice President, bringing the total number of electoral votes cast to 233.) (+17 invalidated) (Note: Elections were held in the Union-occupied military districts in the states of Louisiana and Tennessee, but no electoral votes were counted from them.) of the Electoral College 118 electoral votes needed to win
- Turnout: 73.8% (▼7.4 pp)

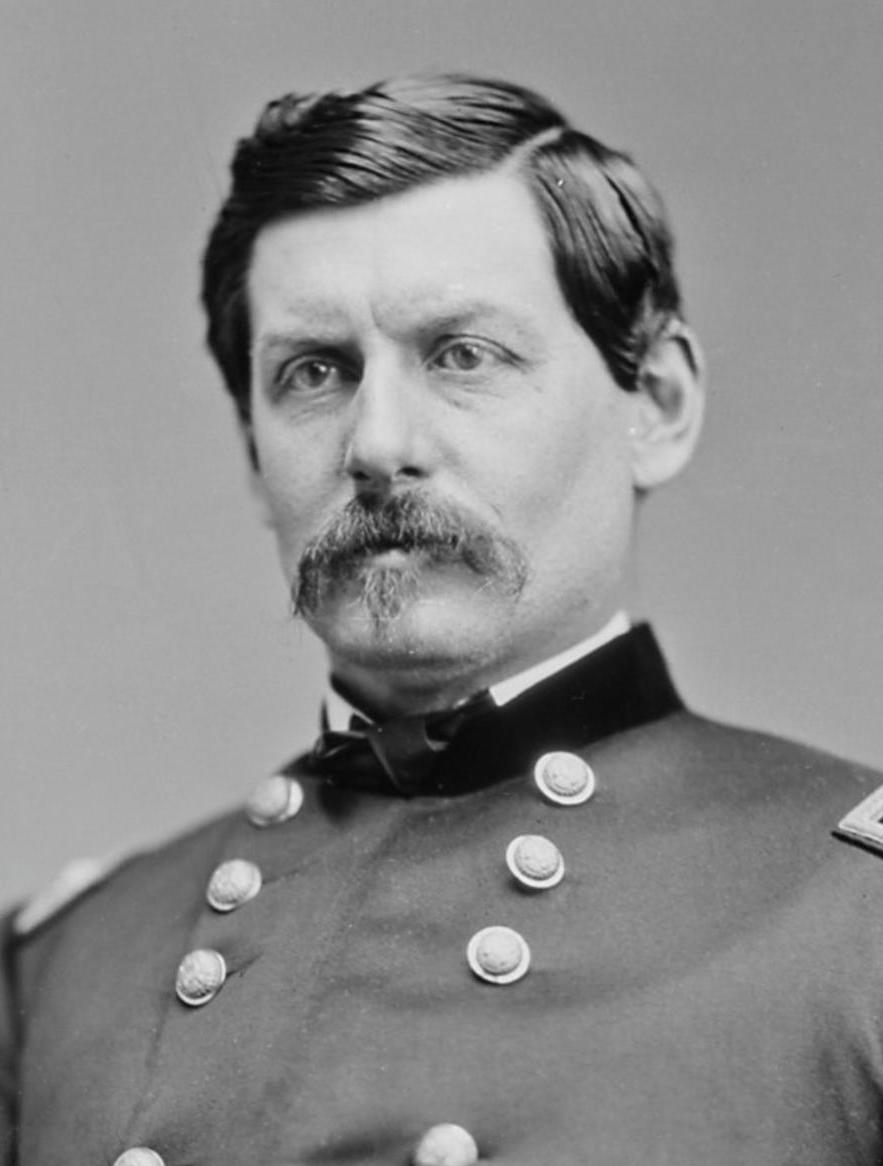
Nominee	Abraham Lincoln	George B. McClellan
Party	National Union	Democratic
Alliance	Republican
Home state	Illinois	New Jersey
Running mate	Andrew Johnson	George H. Pendleton
Electoral vote	212 (+17 invalidated)	21
States carried	22 (+2 invalidated)	3
Popular vote	2,218,388	1,812,807
Percentage	55.0%	45.0%
- Presidential election results map. Maroon denotes states won by Lincoln/Johnson, Blue denotes those won by McClellan/Pendleton, and Brown denotes non-voting Confederate states. The seceded states of Louisiana and Tennessee, which had recently been captured from Confederate control, held elections; however, no electoral votes were counted from either of them due to their allegiance to the Confederacy. One of Nevada's three electors was snowbound and unable to cast a vote for President or Vice President. Numbers indicate electoral votes cast by each state.
President before election
Abraham Lincoln
Republican
Elected President
Abraham Lincoln
National Union

A presidential election was held in the United States on November 8, 1864, near the end of the American Civil War. Incumbent President Abraham Lincoln of the National Union Party broadly defeated the Democratic nominee, former General George B. McClellan, by a wide margin of 212–21 in the electoral college, with 55% of the popular vote. For the election, the Republican Party and some Democrats created the National Union Party, especially to attract War Democrats.

Despite some intra-party opposition from Salmon Chase and the Radical Republicans, Lincoln won his party's nomination at the 1864 National Union National Convention. Rather than re-nominate Vice President Hannibal Hamlin, the convention selected Andrew Johnson of Tennessee, a War Democrat, as Lincoln's running mate. John C. Frémont, who had been the Republican nominee in 1856, started to run as the nominee of the new Radical Democratic Party, with War Democrat John Cochrane as Frémont's running mate; the new party criticized Lincoln for being too moderate on the issue of racial equality, but Frémont and Cochrane withdrew from the race in September and their new party dissolved. The Democrats were divided between the Copperheads, who favored immediate peace with the Confederacy, and War Democrats, who supported the war. The 1864 Democratic National Convention nominated McClellan, a War Democrat, but adopted a platform advocating peace with the Confederacy, which McClellan rejected, although his running mate George H. Pendleton wrote it. While the Confederacy seemed to have survival potential in summer 1864, it was visibly collapsing by election day in November.

Despite his early fears of defeat, Lincoln won strong majorities in the popular and electoral vote, partly as a result of the recent Union victory at the Battle of Atlanta. As the Civil War was still raging, no electoral votes were counted from any of the eleven southern states that had joined the Confederate States of America. Lincoln's re-election ensured that he would preside over the successful conclusion of the Civil War.

Lincoln's victory made him the first president to win re-election since Andrew Jackson in 1832, as well as the first Northern president to ever win re-election. Lincoln was assassinated six weeks into his second term. He was succeeded by his vice president, Andrew Johnson, who favored quick restoration of the seceded states to the Union without protection for the former slaves. This led to conflict with the Republican-dominated Congress, culminating in Johnson's impeachment by the House of Representatives in 1868; he was acquitted in the Senate by one vote.

== Background ==
The 1864 presidential election took place during the American Civil War. According to the Miller Center for the study of the presidency, the election was noteworthy for occurring at all, an unprecedented democratic exercise in the midst of a civil war.

A group of Republican dissidents who called themselves Radical Republicans formed a party named the Radical Democratic Party and nominated John C. Frémont as their candidate for president. Frémont later withdrew and endorsed Lincoln. War Democrats joined with Republicans as the National Union Party, with Lincoln at the head of the ticket. The National Union Party was a temporary name used to attract War Democrats and Southern Border State Unionists who would not vote for the Republican Party. It faced off against the regular Democratic Party, including Peace Democrats.

== Nominations ==
The 1864 presidential election conventions of the parties are considered below in order of the party's popular vote.

=== National Union Party nomination ===
1864 National Union Party ticket
Abraham Lincoln	Andrew Johnson
for President	for Vice President
16th President of the United States (1861–1865)	Military Governor of Tennessee (1862–1865)

National Union candidates:

- Abraham Lincoln, President of the United States
- Ulysses S. Grant, Commanding General from Illinois

==== National Union Party presidential candidates gallery ====
President Abraham Lincoln

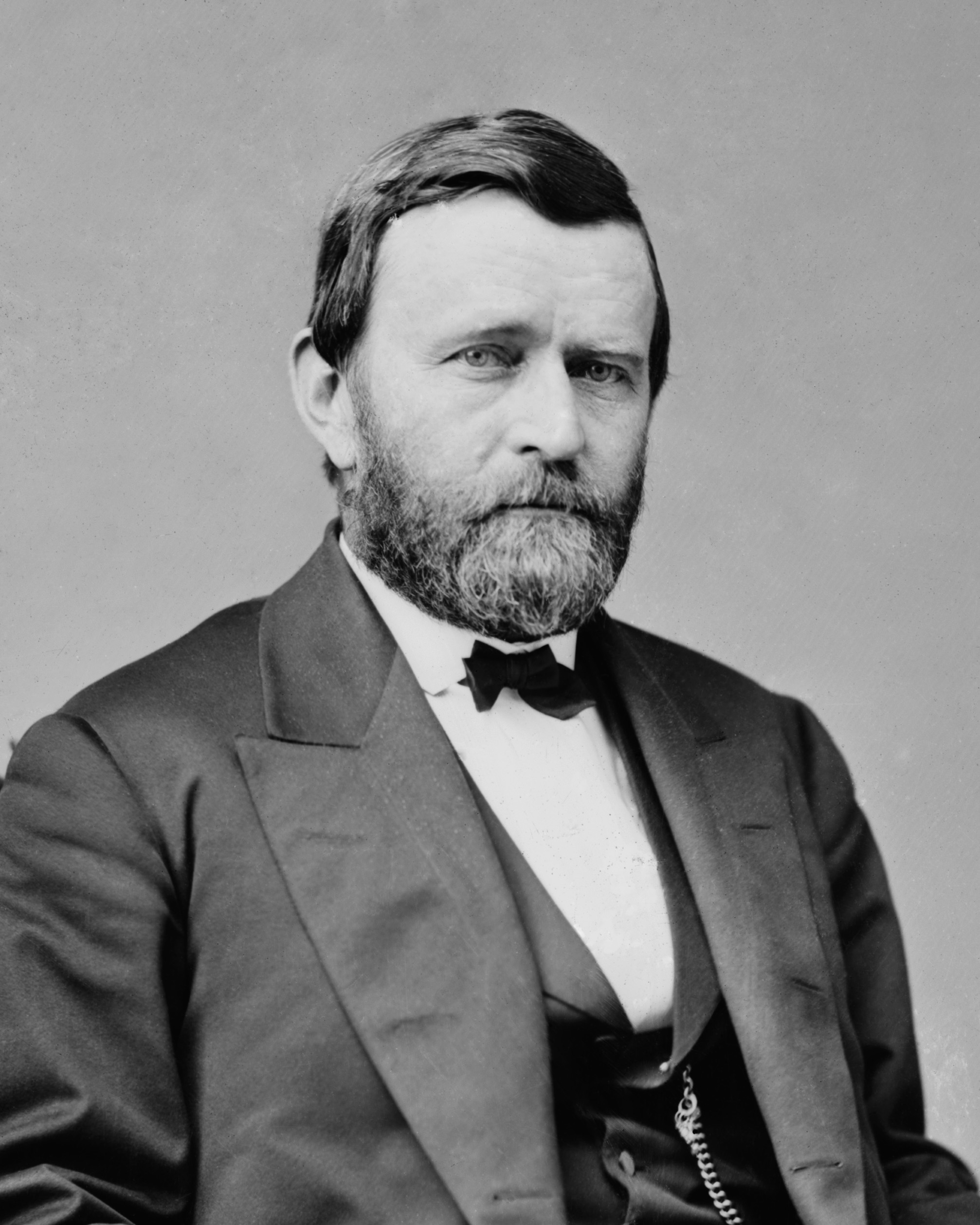
Commanding General Ulysses S. Grant from Illinois

==== National Union Party vice presidential candidates gallery ====
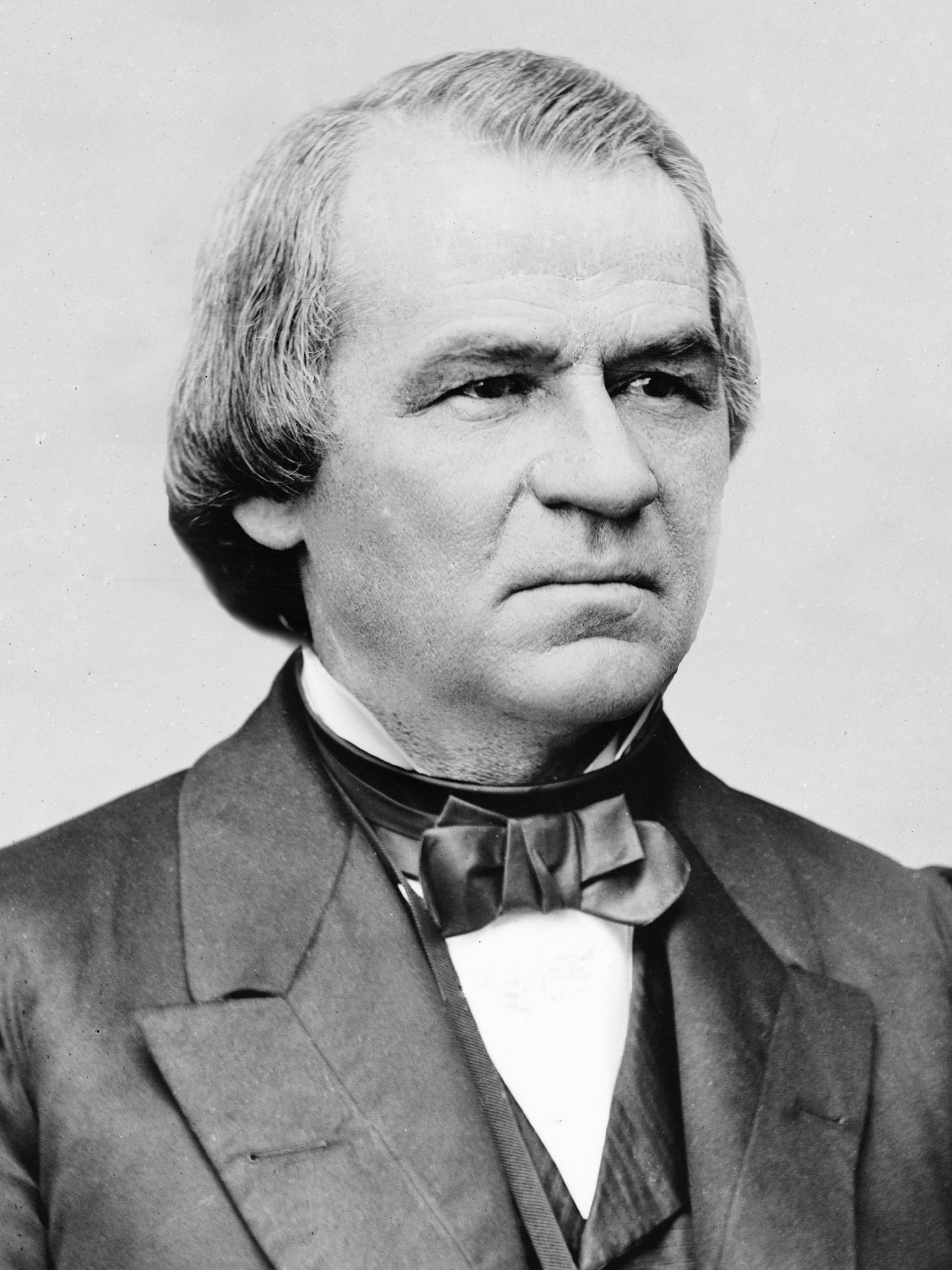
Former Senator Andrew Johnson from Tennessee

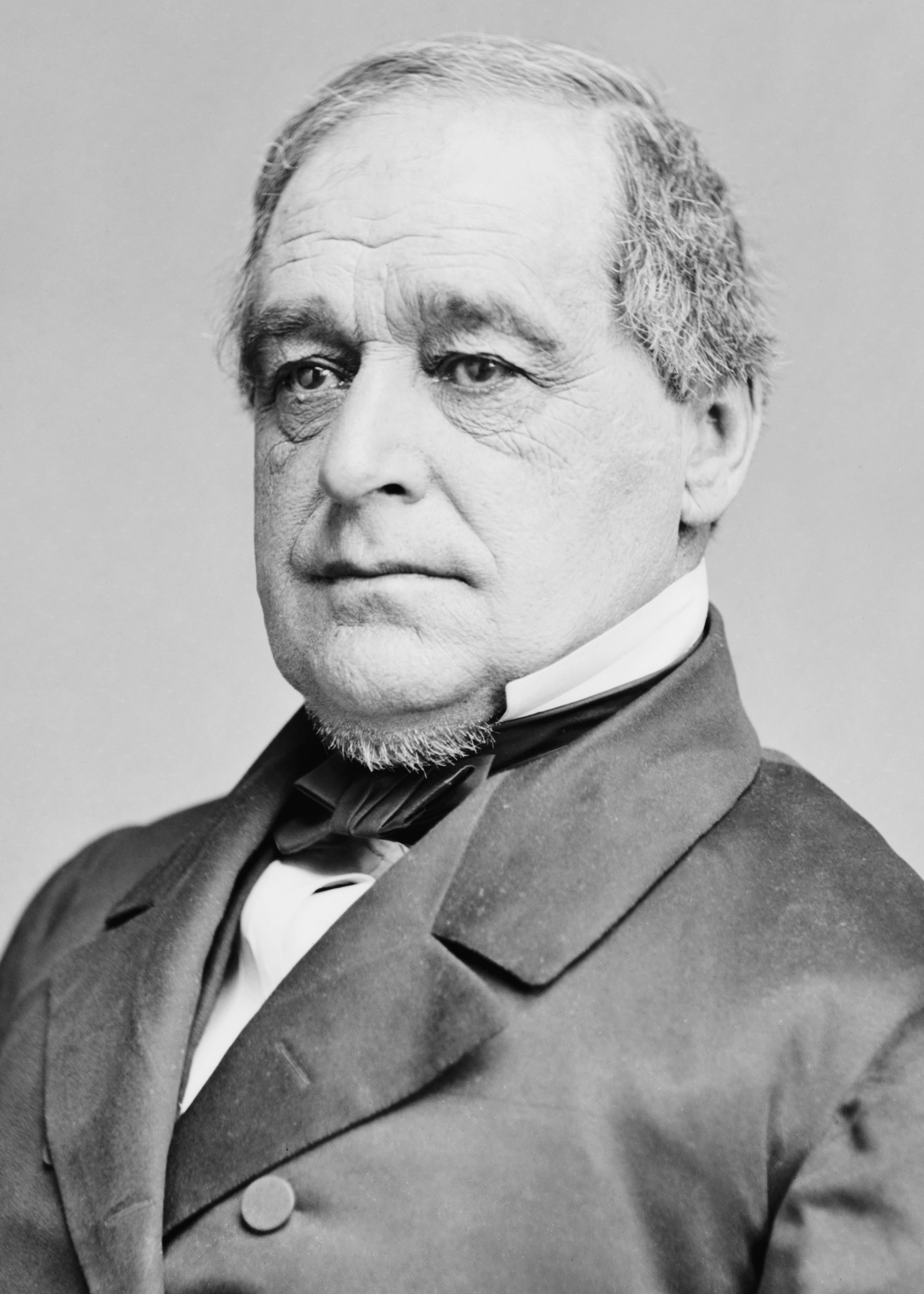
Vice President Hannibal Hamlin from Maine

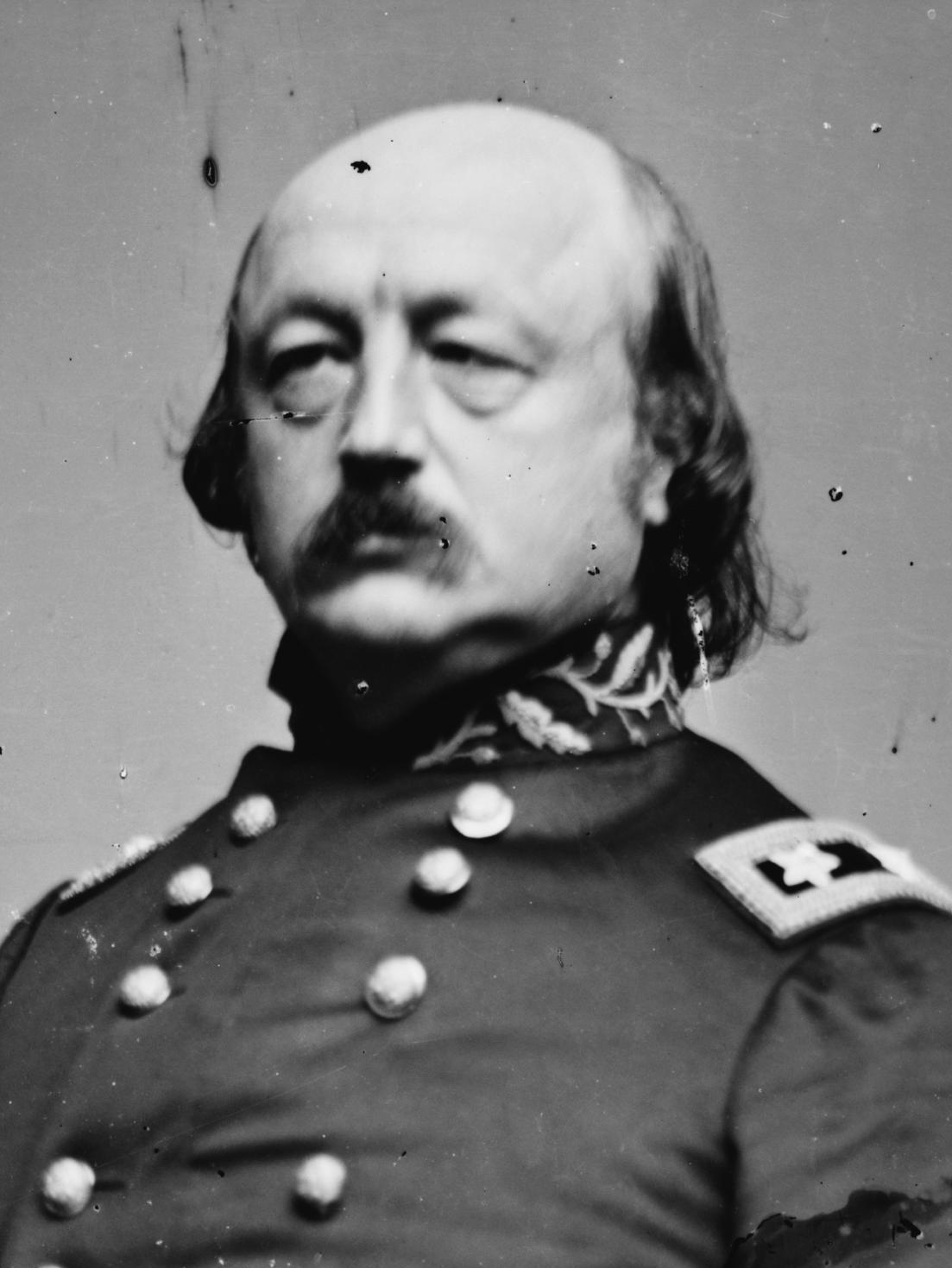
Major General Benjamin Butler from Massachusetts

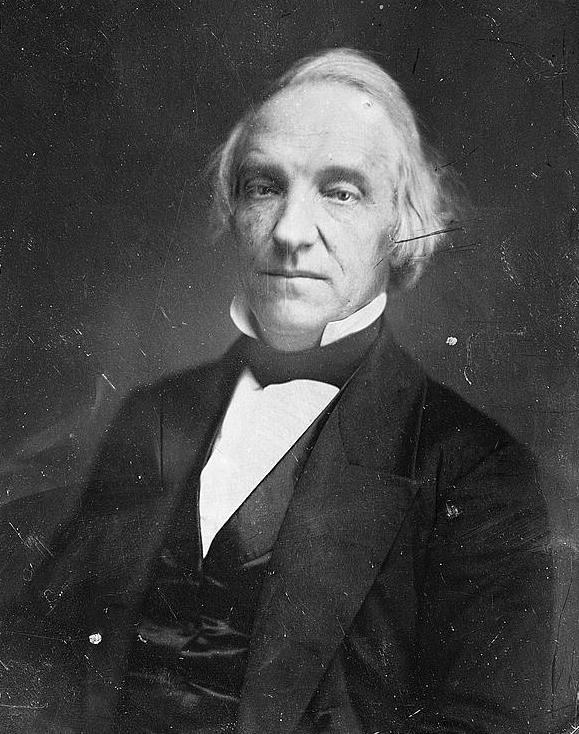
Former Senator Daniel Dickinson from New York

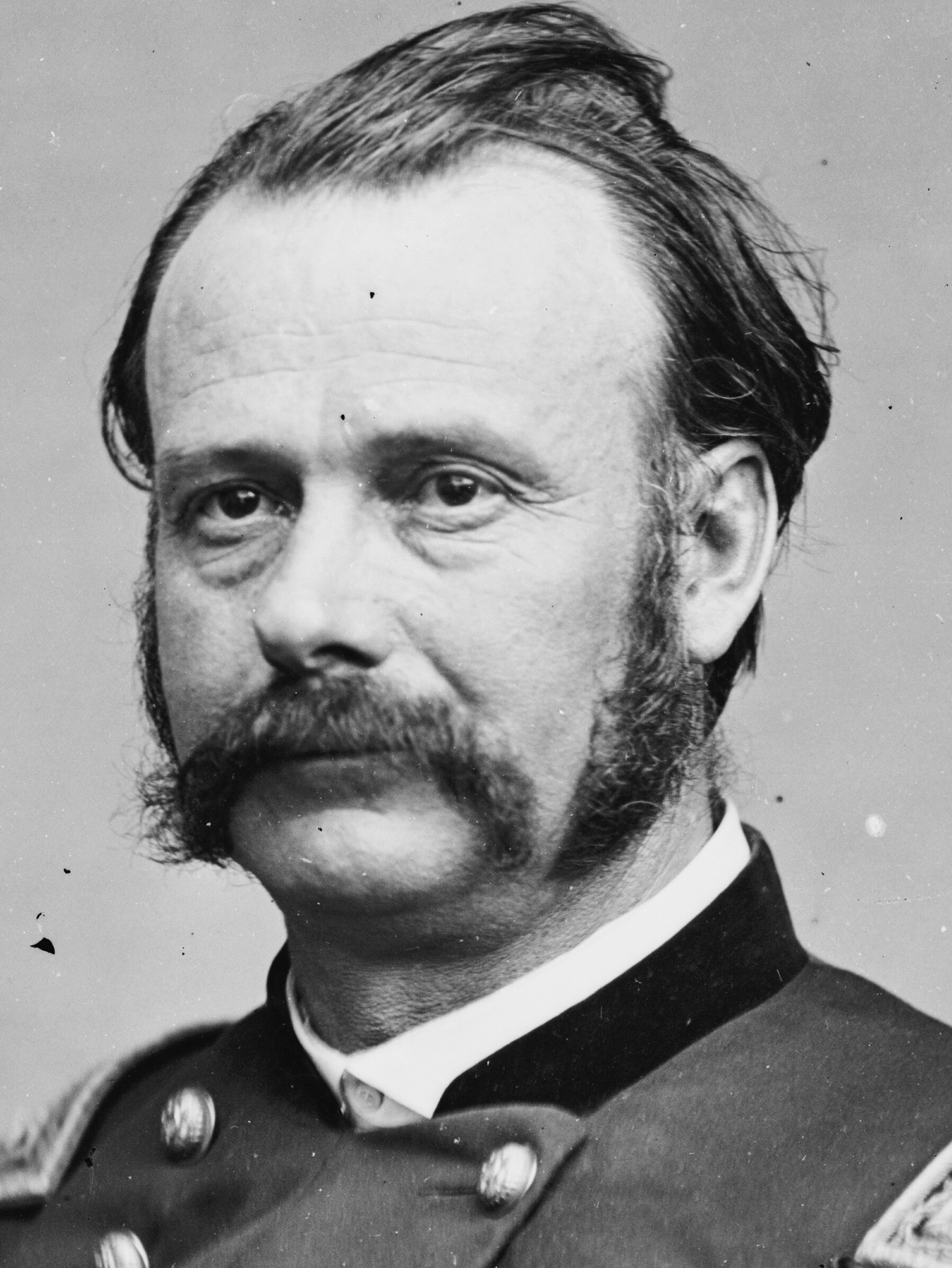
Major General Lovell Rousseau from Kentucky

==== Temporary split in the Republican Party ====
As the Civil War progressed, political opinions within the Republican Party began to diverge. Senators Charles Sumner and Henry Wilson from Massachusetts wanted the Republican Party to advocate constitutional amendments to prohibit slavery and guarantee racial equality before the law. Initially, not all northern Republicans supported such measures.

Democratic leaders hoped that the radical Republicans would put forth their own ticket in the election. The New York World newspaper, particularly interested in undermining the National Union Party, ran a series of articles predicting a delay for the National Union Convention until late in 1864 to allow Frémont time to collect delegates to win the nomination. Frémont supporters in New York City established a newspaper called the New Nation, which declared in one of its initial issues that the National Union Convention would be a "nonentity". The New York World also published false information (further purported by Samuel S. Cox) to limit Lincoln's popularity.

==== National Union Party ====
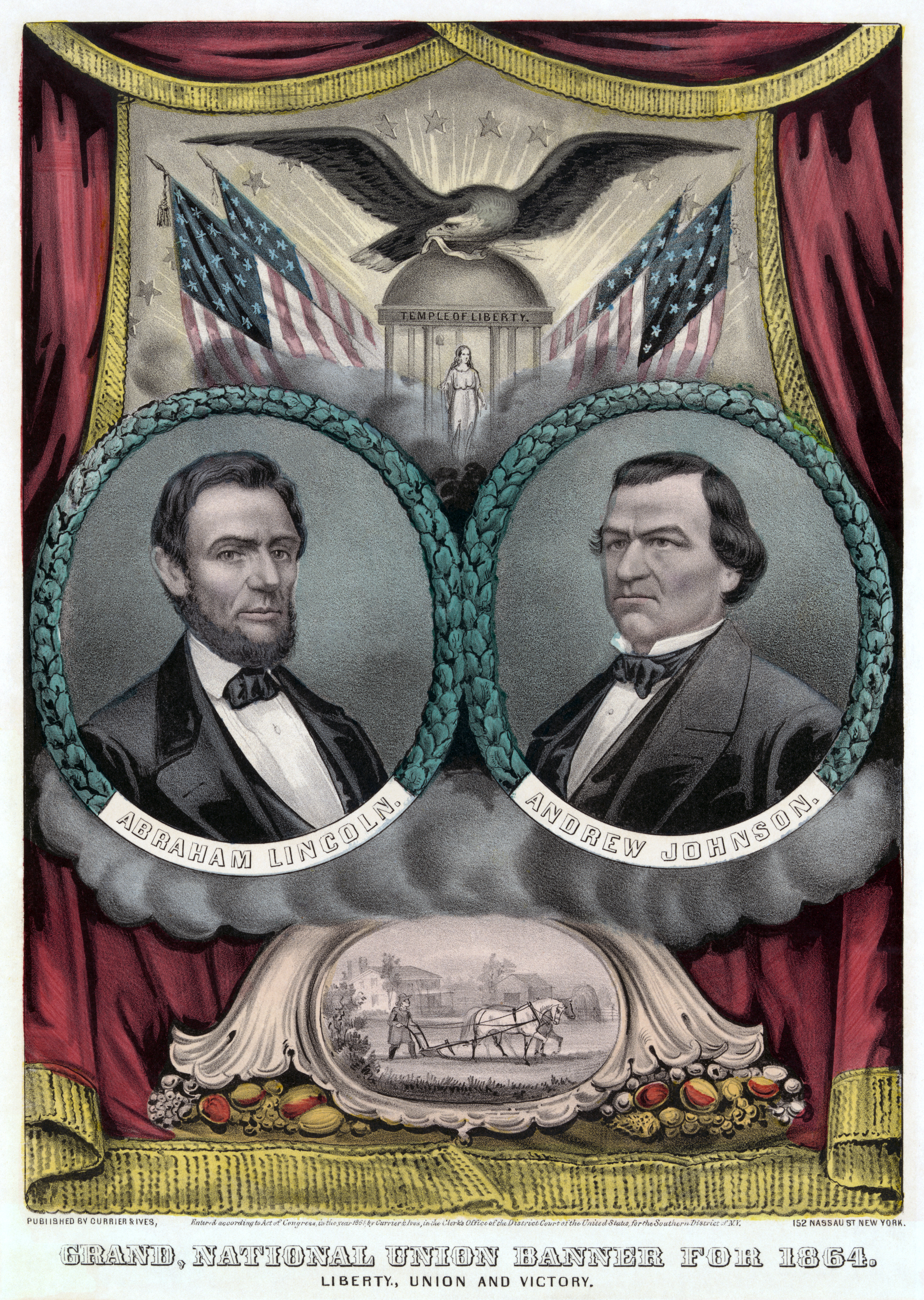
Lincoln and Johnson campaign poster

Before the election, some War Democrats joined the Republicans to form the National Union Party. With the outcome of the Civil War still in doubt, some political leaders, including Salmon P. Chase, Benjamin Wade, and Horace Greeley, opposed Lincoln's re-nomination on the grounds that he could not win. Chase himself became the only candidate to contest Lincoln's re-nomination actively, but he withdrew in March when a slew of Republican officials, including some within the state of Ohio upon whom Chase's campaign depended, endorsed Lincoln for re-nomination. Lincoln was still popular with most members of the Republican Party, and the National Union Party nominated him for a second term as president at their convention in Baltimore, Maryland, on June 7–8, 1864. The party platform included these goals: "pursuit of the war, until the Confederacy surrendered unconditionally; a constitutional amendment for the abolition of slavery; aid to disabled Union veterans; continued European neutrality; enforcement of the Monroe Doctrine; encouragement of immigration; and construction of a transcontinental railroad." It also praised the use of black troops and Lincoln's management of the war.

With incumbent vice president Hannibal Hamlin remaining indifferent about the prospect of a second term in office, Andrew Johnson, the former senator from and current military governor of Tennessee, was named as Lincoln's vice presidential running-mate. He had been governor of Tennessee from 1853 to 1857 and was elected by the legislature to the Senate in 1857. In his congressional service, he sought passage of the Homestead Bill which was enacted soon after he left his Senate seat in 1862. When the Southern slave states, including Tennessee, seceded, he remained firmly with the Union. He was the only sitting senator from a Confederate state who did not resign his seat upon learning of his state's secession. In 1862, Lincoln appointed him as military governor of Tennessee after most of it had been retaken. In 1864, Johnson was a logical choice as running mate for Lincoln, who wished to send a message of national unity in his re-election campaign, especially to ensure the electoral votes of the border states.

Others who were considered for the nomination, at one point or another, were former Senator Daniel Dickinson, Major General Benjamin Butler, Major General William Rosecrans, Joseph Holt, and former Treasury Secretary and Senator John Dix.

=== Democratic Party nomination ===
1864 Democratic Party ticket
George B. McClellan	George H. Pendleton
for President	for Vice President
4th Commanding General of the U.S. Army (1861–1862)	U.S. Representative for Ohio's 1st (1857–1865)
Campaign

Democratic presidential candidates:

- George B. McClellan, General from New Jersey
- Thomas H. Seymour, Former Governor of Connecticut

==== Democratic Party candidates gallery ====
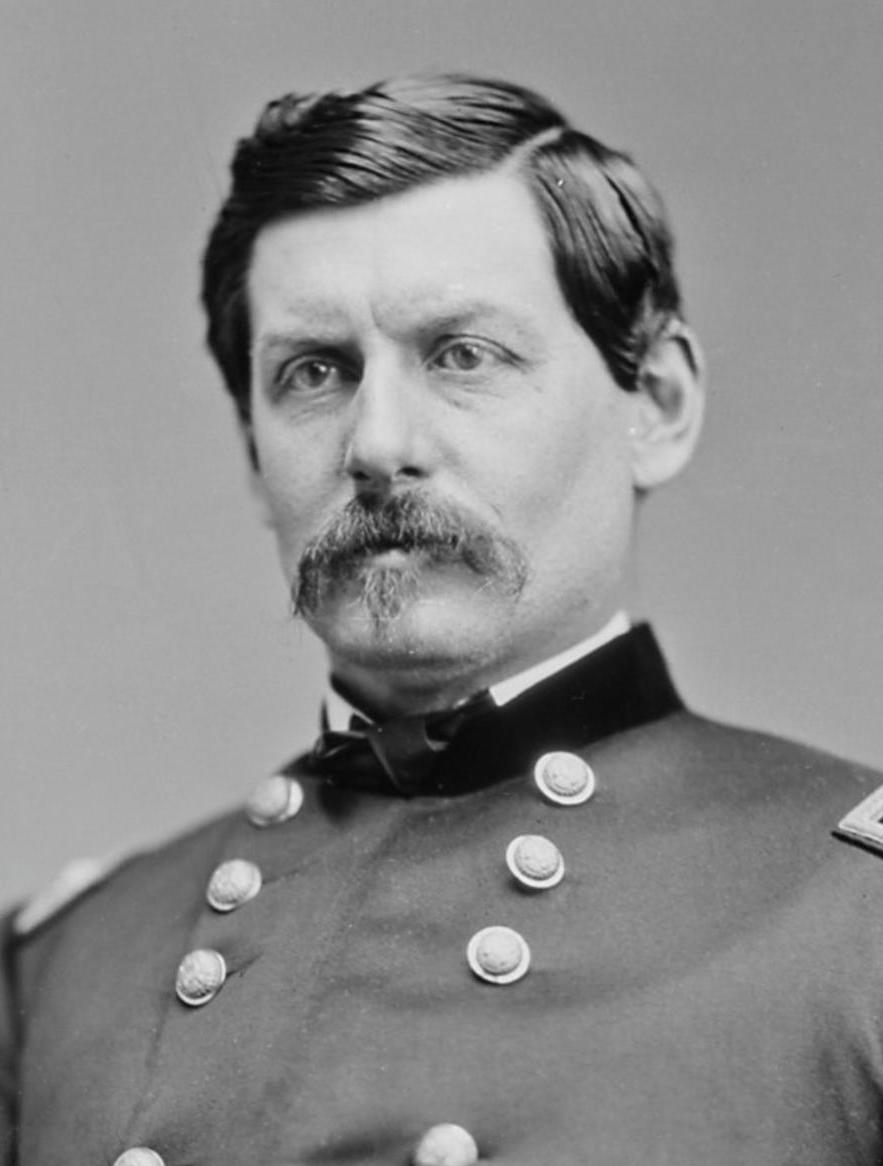
Major General
George B. McClellan
of New Jersey

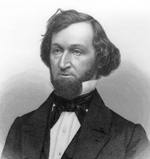
Former Governor Thomas H. Seymour
of Connecticut

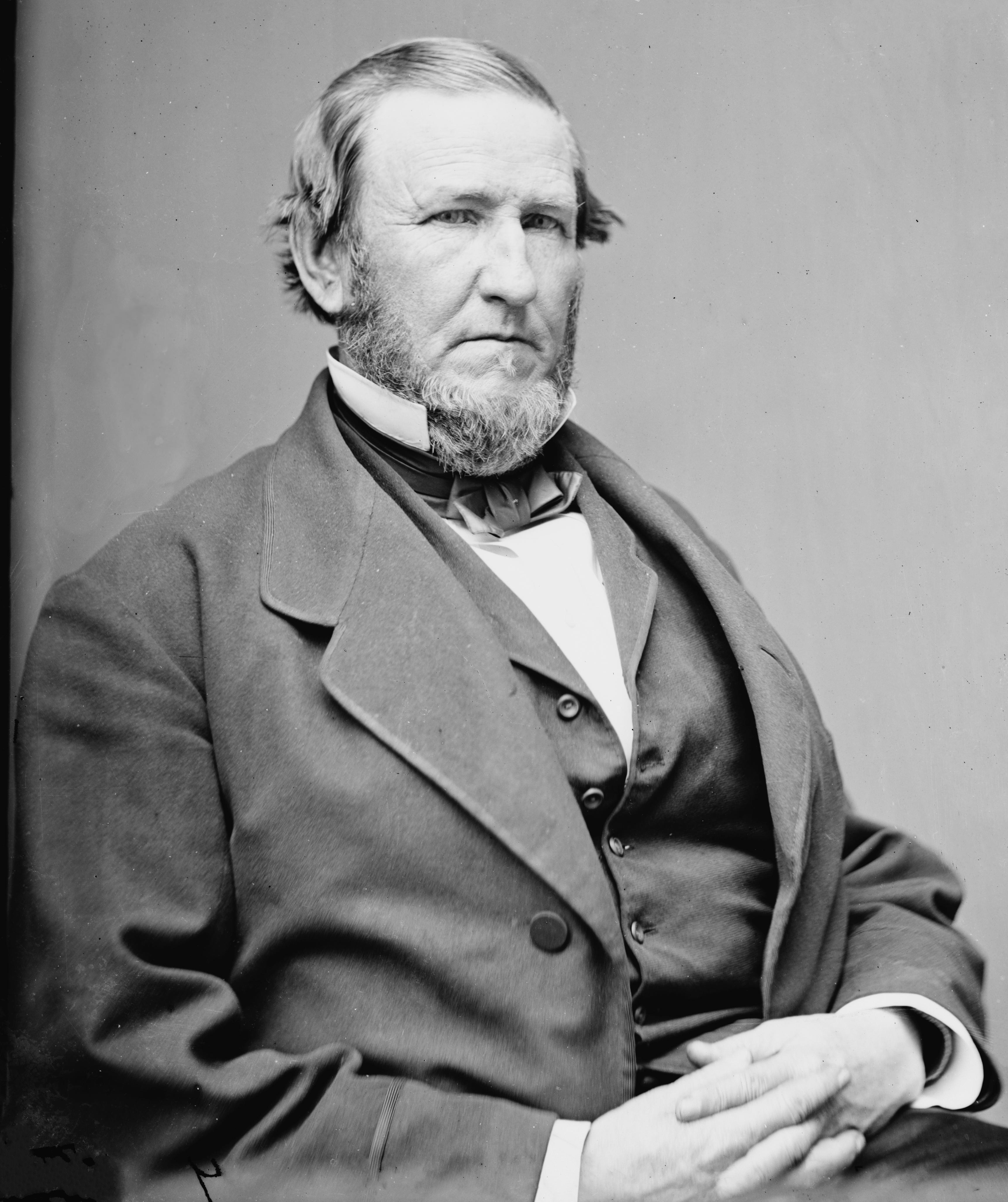
Senator
Lazarus W. Powell
of Kentucky
(Declined to be Nominated)

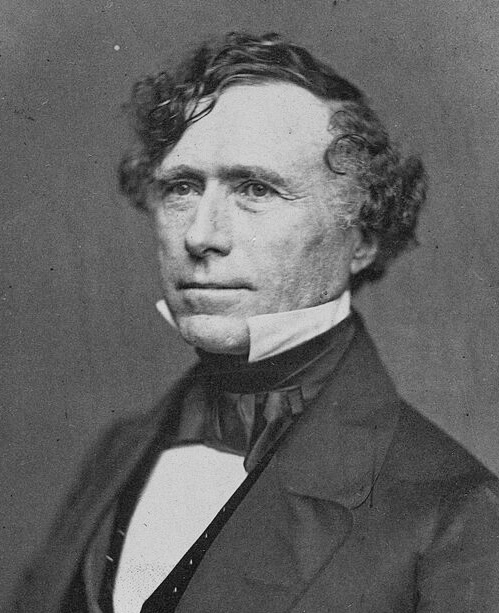
Former President Franklin Pierce
of New Hampshire
(Declined to be Nominated)

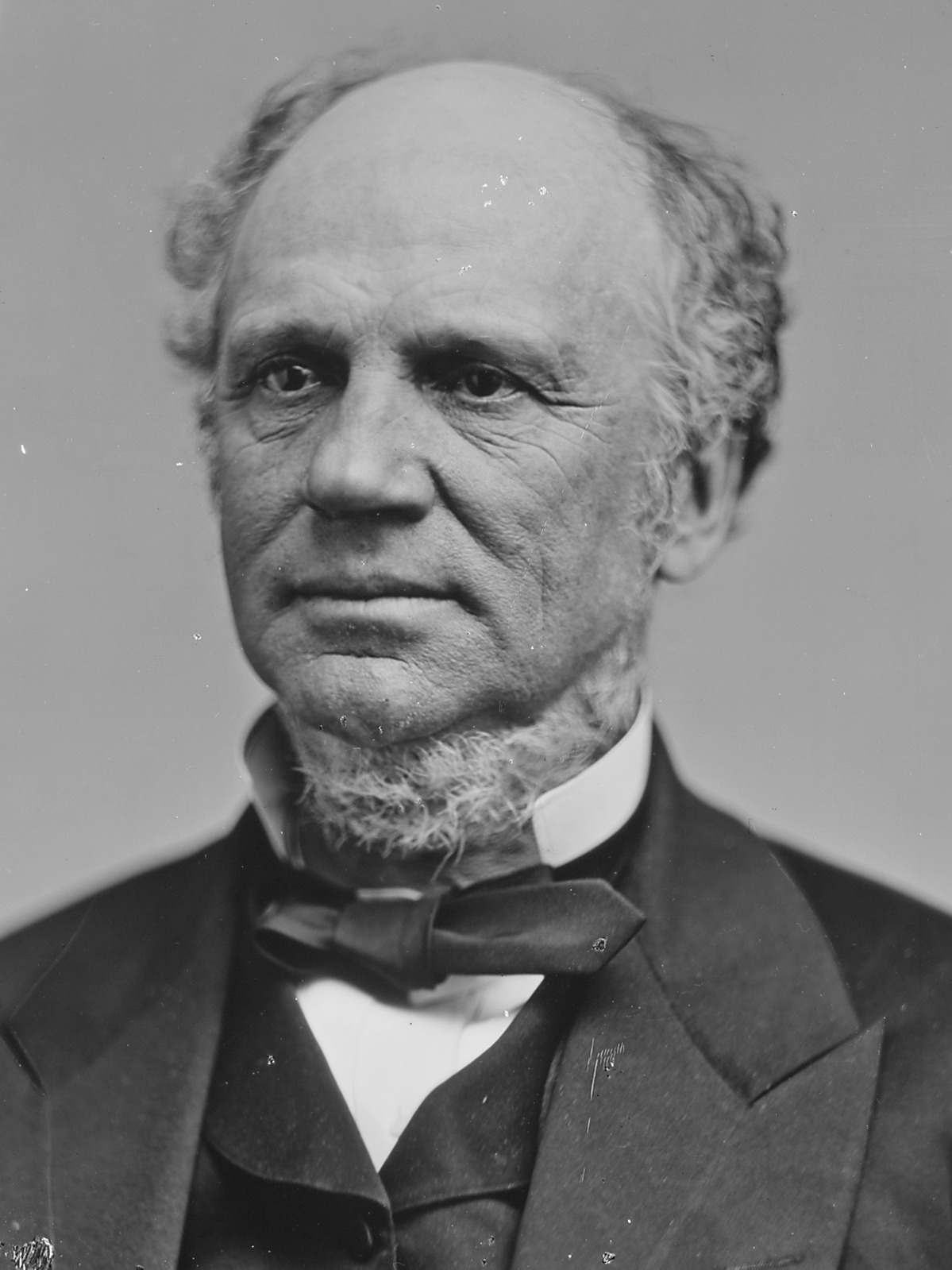
Governor
Horatio Seymour
of New York
(Declined to be Nominated)

==== Democratic Party vice presidential candidates gallery ====
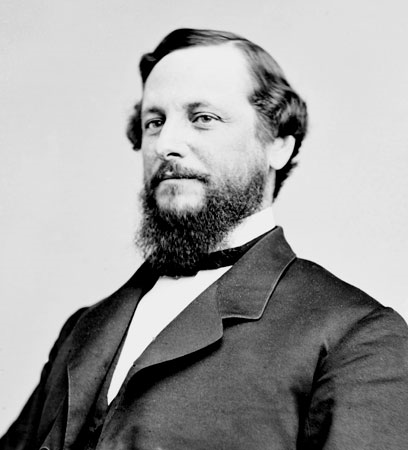
Representative
George H. Pendleton
from Ohio

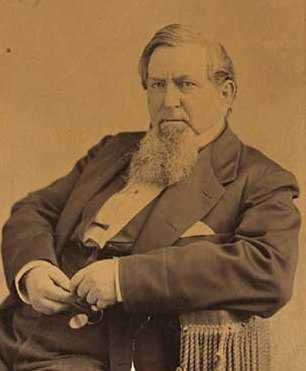
Railroad President George W. Cass
from Pennsylvania

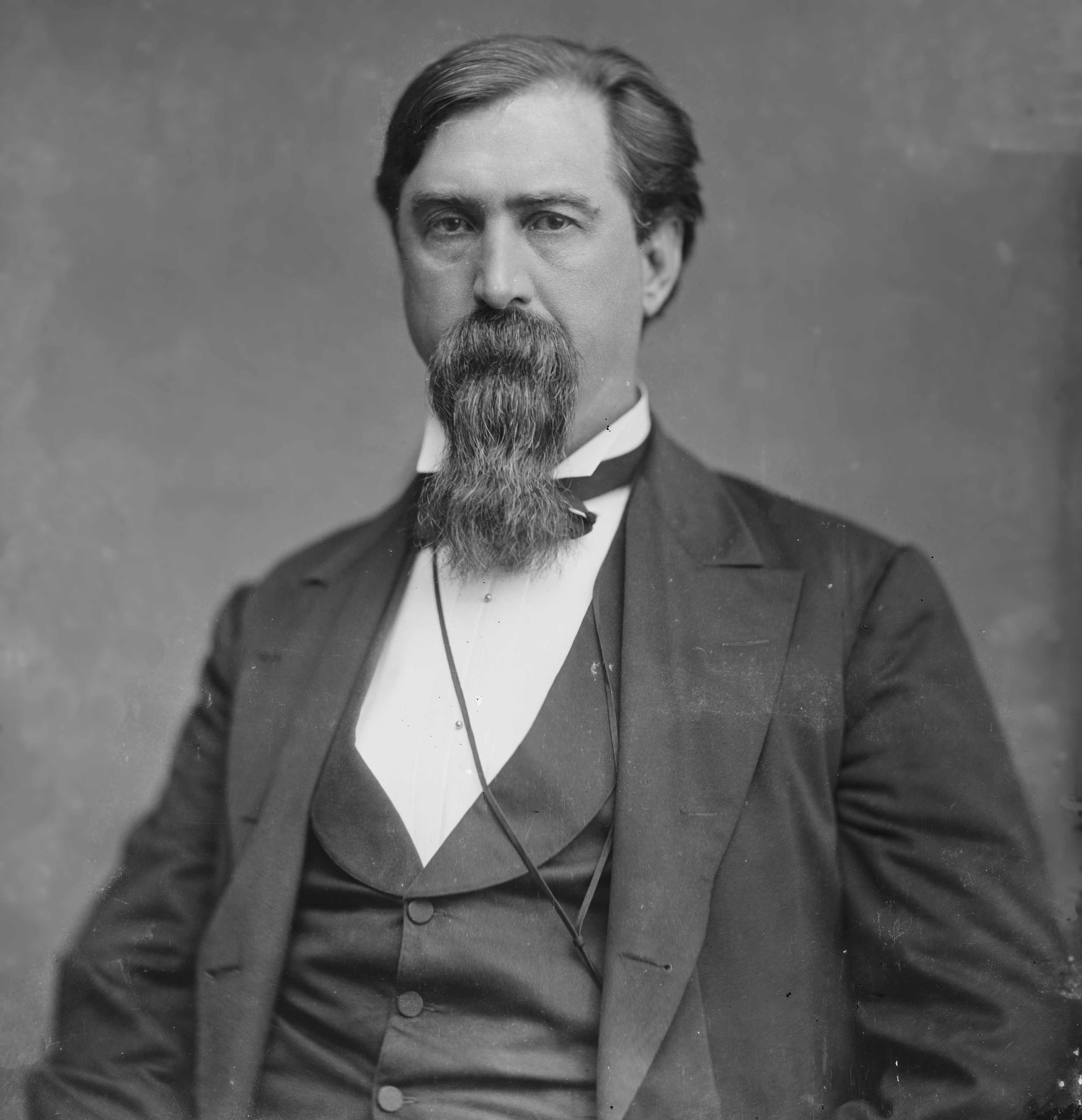
Representative
Daniel W. Voorhees
from Indiana

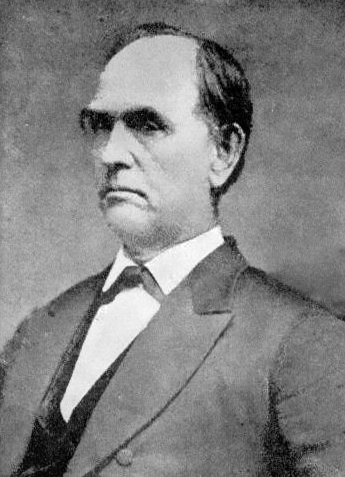
Former Senator Augustus C. Dodge
from Iowa

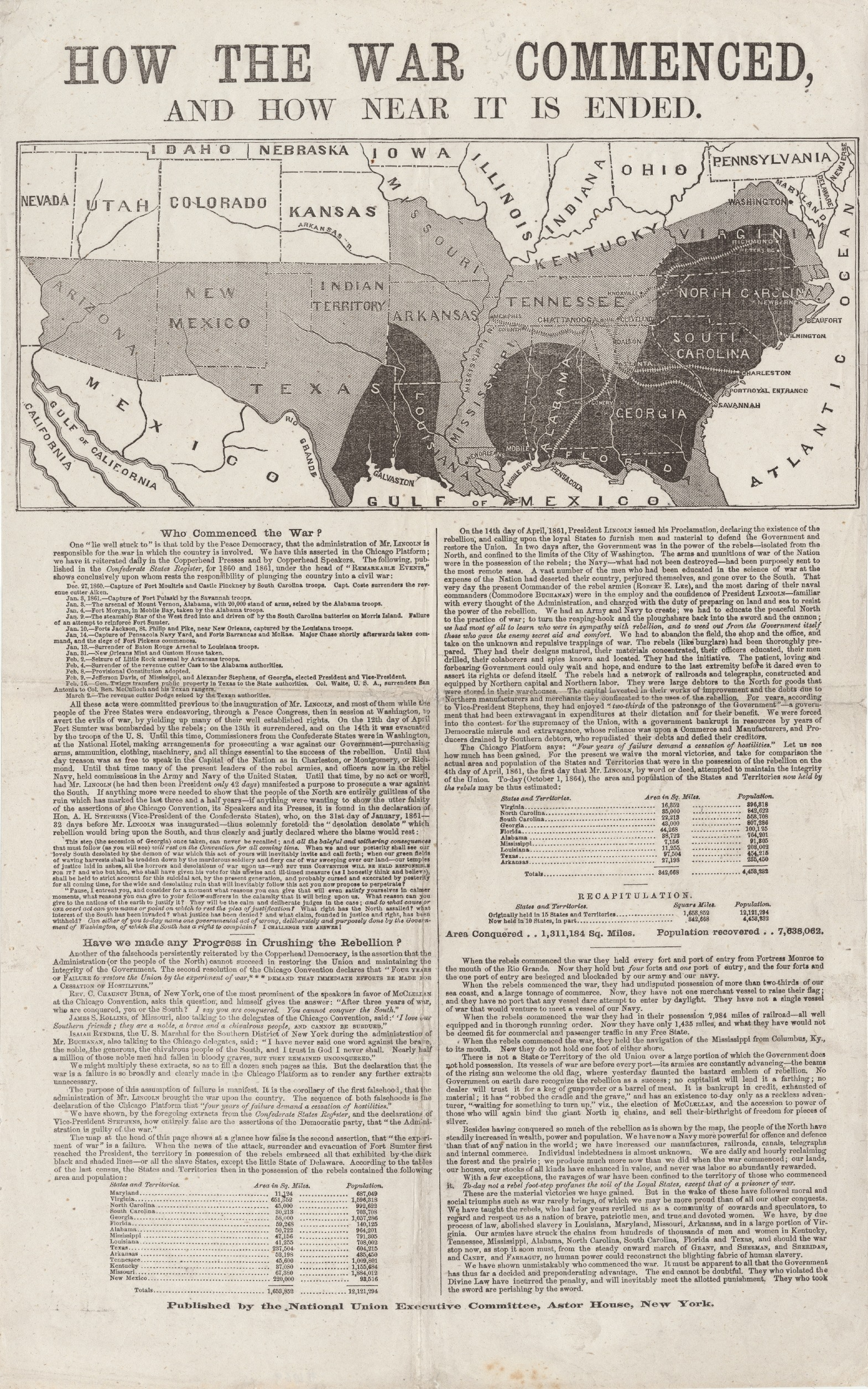
"How the War Commenced and How Near It Is Ended" published by the National Union Executive Committee.

The Democratic Party was bitterly split between War Democrats and Peace Democrats, a group further divided among competing factions. Moderate Peace Democrats who supported the war against the Confederacy, such as Horatio Seymour, were preaching the wisdom of a negotiated peace. After the Union victory at the Battle of Gettysburg in 1863, moderate Peace Democrats proposed a negotiated peace that would secure Union victory. They believed this was the best course of action, because an armistice could finish the war without devastating the South. Radical Peace Democrats known as Copperheads, such as Thomas H. Seymour, declared the war to be a failure and favored an immediate end to hostilities without securing Union victory.

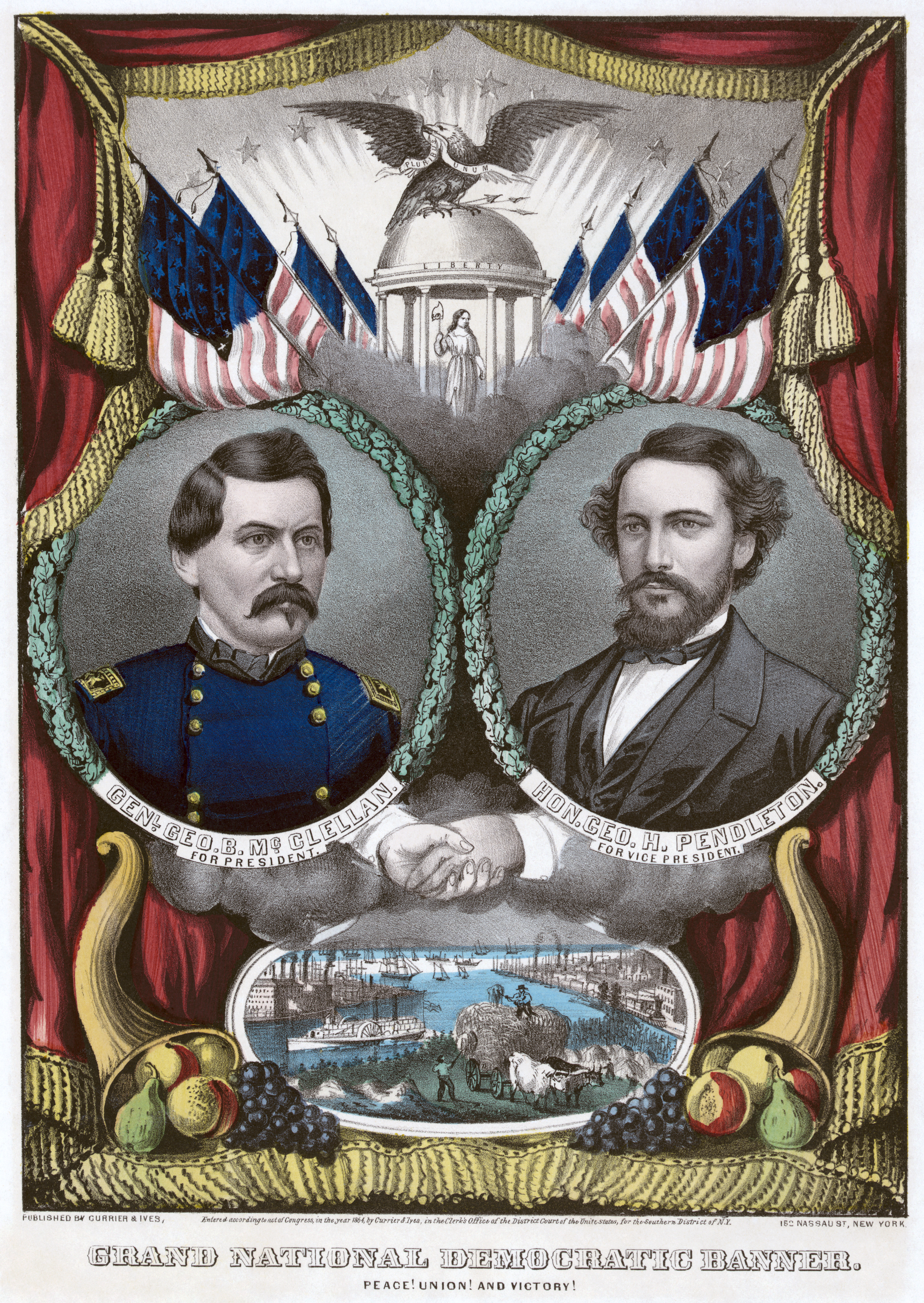
McClellan and Pendleton campaign poster

George B. McClellan vied for the presidential nomination. Additionally, friends of Horatio Seymour insisted on placing his name before the convention, which was held in Chicago, Illinois, on August 29–31, 1864. But on the day before the organization of that body, Horatio Seymour announced positively that he would not be a candidate.

Since the Democrats were divided by issues of war and peace, they sought a strong candidate who could unify the party. The compromise was to nominate pro-war General George B. McClellan for president and anti-war Representative George H. Pendleton for vice president. McClellan, a War Democrat, was nominated for president over the Copperhead Thomas H. Seymour. Pendleton, a close associate of the Copperhead Clement Vallandigham, balanced the ticket, since he was known for having strongly opposed the Union war effort. The convention adopted a peace platform – a platform McClellan personally rejected. McClellan supported the continuation of the war and restoration of the Union, but the party platform, written by Vallandigham, opposed this position.

=== Radical Democratic Party nomination ===
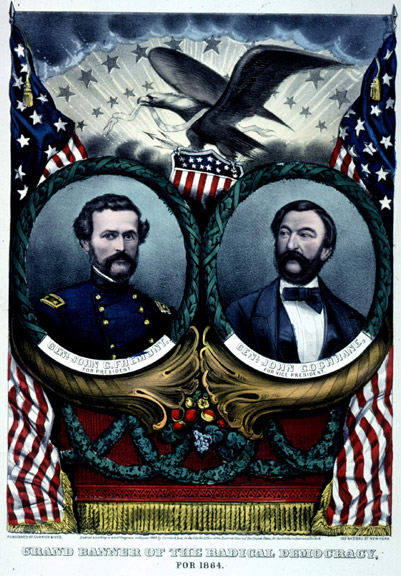
Frémont and Cochrane campaign poster

==== Radical Democratic Party candidates gallery ====
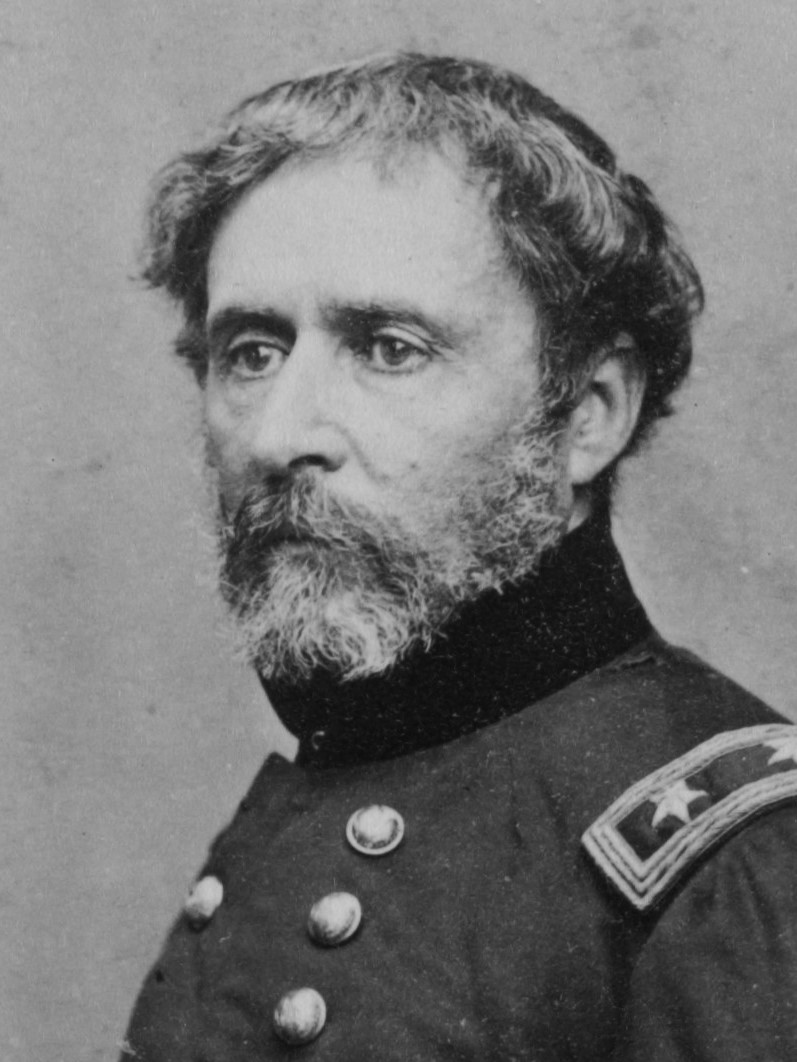
Former Senator John C. Frémont from California
(Withdrew Sep. 22, 1864)

==== Radical Democratic Party vice presidential candidates gallery ====
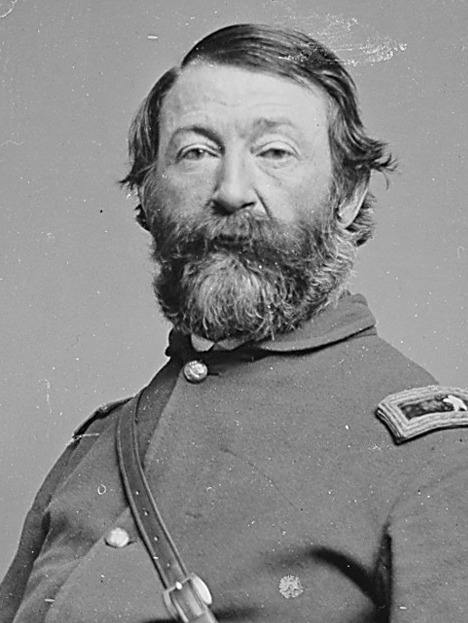
General John Cochrane from New York

The Radical Democratic Convention assembled in Ohio with delegates arriving on May 29, 1864. The New York Times reported that the hall which the convention organizers had planned to use had been double-booked by an opera troupe. Almost all delegates were instructed to support Frémont, with a major exception being the New York delegation, which was composed of War Democrats who supported Ulysses S. Grant. Various estimates of the number of delegates were reported in the press; The New York Times reported 156 delegates, but the number generally reported elsewhere was 350 delegates. The delegates came from 15 states and the District of Columbia. They adopted the name Radical Democratic Party.

A supporter of Grant was appointed chairman. The platform was passed with little discussion, and a series of resolutions that bogged down the convention proceedings were voted down decisively. The convention nominated Frémont for president, and he accepted the nomination on June 4, 1864. In his letter, he stated that he would step aside if the National Union Convention would nominate someone other than Lincoln for president. John Cochrane was nominated for vice president.

== General election ==
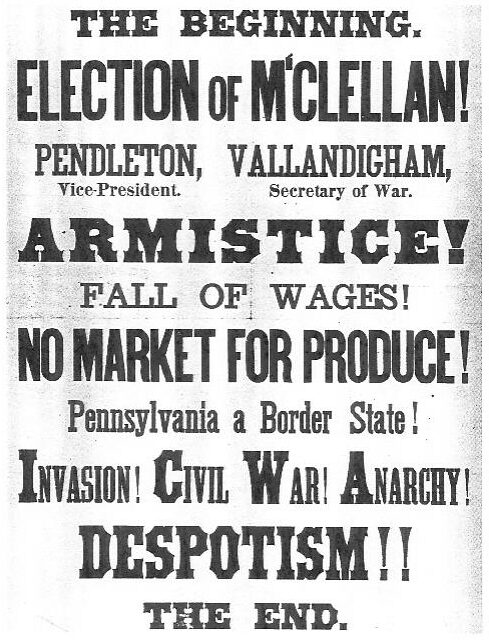
A National Union poster warns of a McClellan victory.

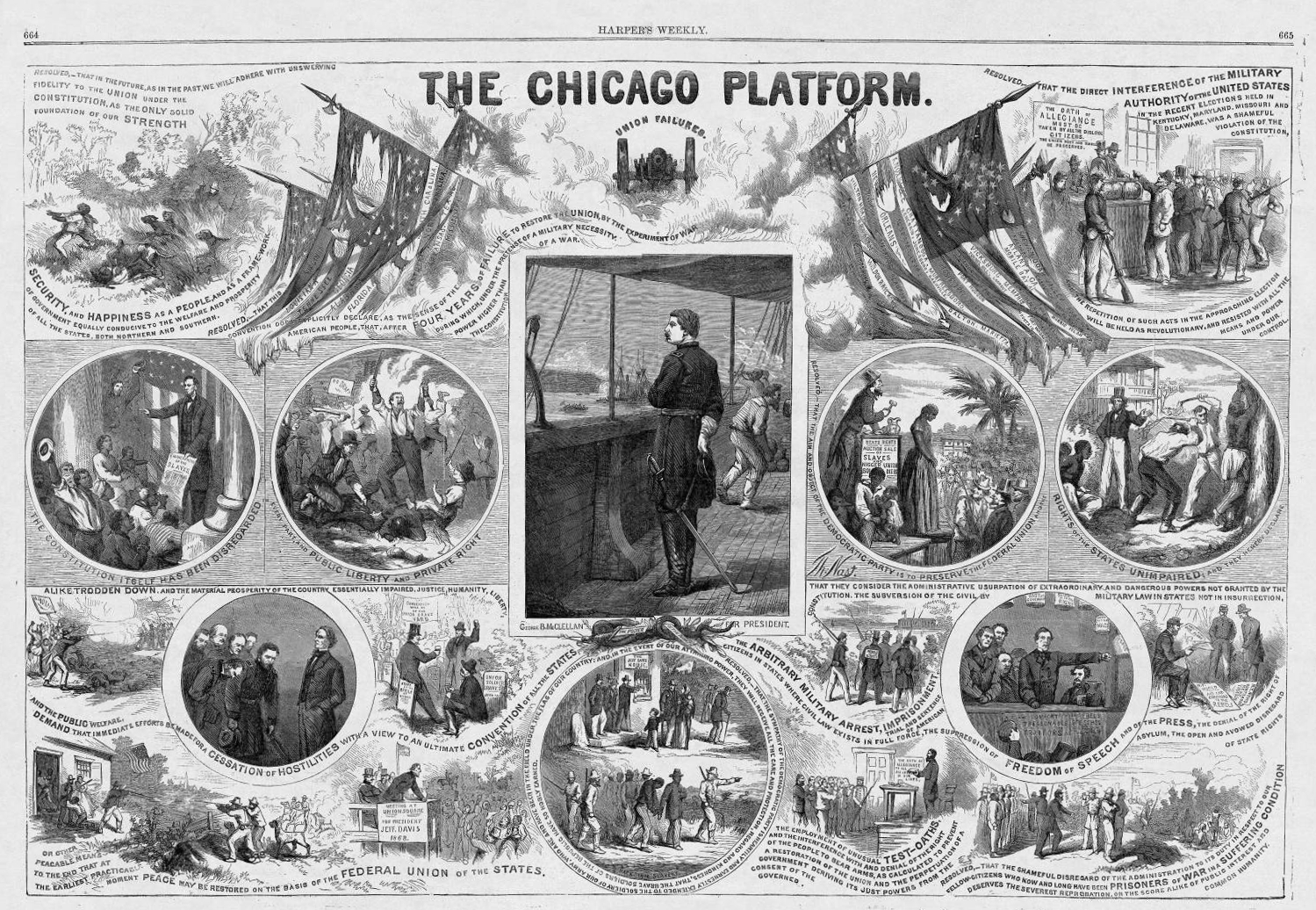
An anti-McClellan poster from Harper's Weekly, drawn by Thomas Nast, showing rioters assaulting children, slave-catchers chasing runaway slaves, and a woman being sold at a slave auction.

The 1864 election was the first time since 1812 that a presidential election took place during a war.

For much of 1864, Lincoln himself believed he had little chance of being re-elected. Confederate forces had triumphed at the Battle of Mansfield, the Battle of Cold Harbor, the Battle of Brices Cross Roads, the Battle of Kennesaw Mountain and the Battle of the Crater. In addition, the war was continuing to take a very high toll in terms of casualties with campaigns such as Grant's Overland Campaign and the perceived lack of progress. The prospect of a long and bloody war started to make the idea of "peace at all cost" offered by the Ultra Peace Democrats look more desirable.

However, several political and military events eventually made Lincoln's re-election inevitable. In the first place, the Democrats had to confront the severe internal strains within their party at the Democratic National Convention. The political compromises made at the Democratic National Convention were contradictory and made McClellan's efforts to campaign seem inconsistent.

Secondly, the Democratic National Convention influenced Frémont's campaign. Frémont was appalled at the Democratic platform, which he described as "union with slavery". After three weeks of discussions with Cochrane and his supporters, Frémont withdrew from the race in September 1864. In his statement, Frémont declared that winning the Civil War was too important to divide the Republican vote. Although he still felt that Lincoln was not going far enough, the defeat of McClellan was of the greatest necessity. General Cochrane, who was a War Democrat, agreed and withdrew with Frémont. On September 23, 1864, Frémont also brokered a political deal in which Lincoln removed U.S. Postmaster General Montgomery Blair from office, and on September 24 Abraham Lincoln relieved Blair of his duty as Postmaster General. McClellan's chances of victory faded after Frémont withdrew from the presidential race.

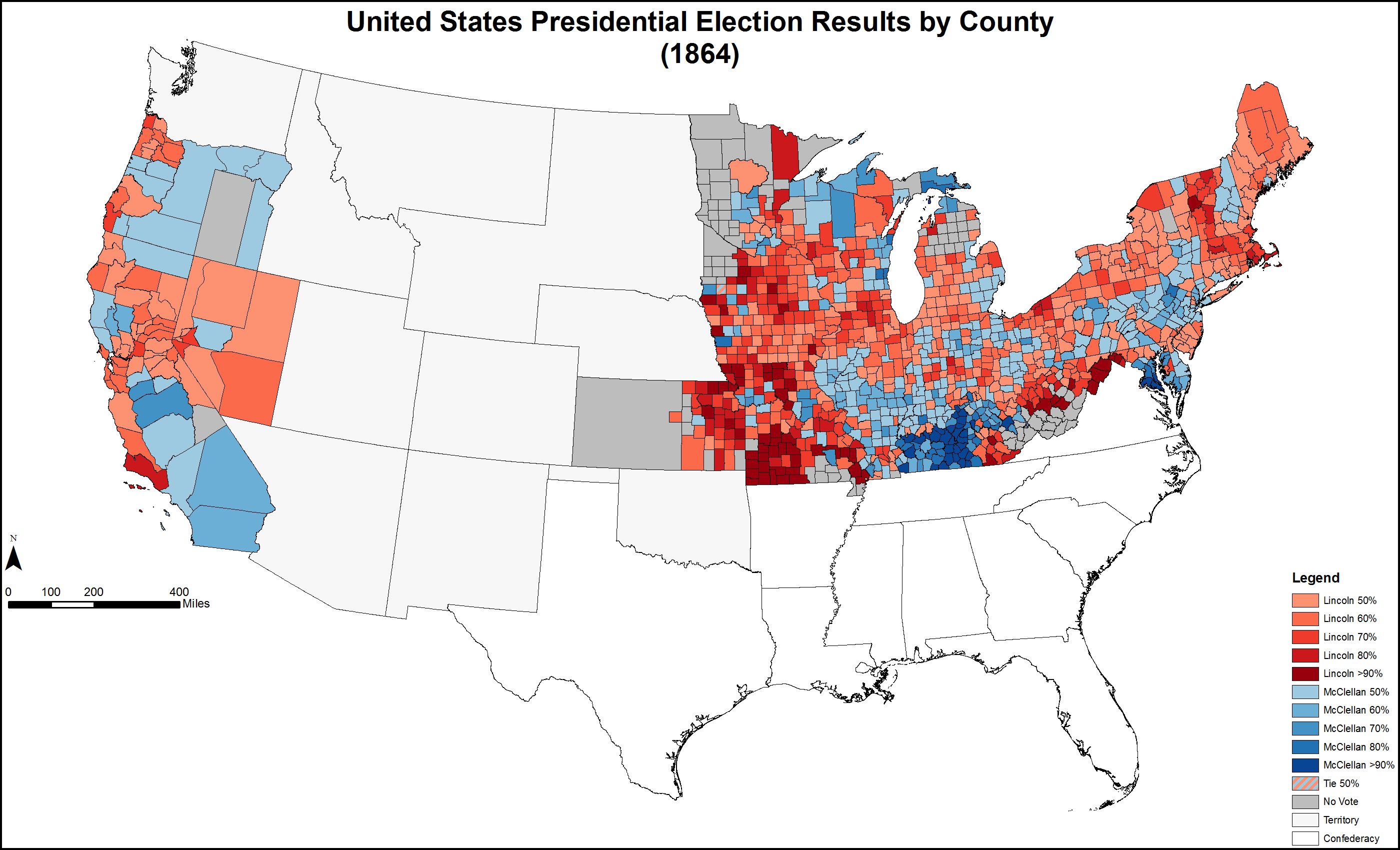
Results by county explicitly indicating the percentage of the winning candidate in each county. Shades of red are for Lincoln (National Union) and shades of blue are for McClellan (Democratic).

Lastly, with the fall of Atlanta on September 2, there was no longer any question that a Union military victory was inevitable and close at hand.

In the end, the Union Party mobilized the full strength of both the Republicans and the War Democrats under the slogan "Don't change horses in the middle of a stream". It was energized as Lincoln made emancipation the central issue, and state Republican parties stressed the perfidy of the Copperheads.

=== Results ===
24.4% of the voting age population and 76.3% of eligible voters participated in the election. The American Civil War was in progress and unfinished during this election. Because eleven Southern states plus two claimed additional Southern states had declared secession from the Union and formed the Confederate States of America, only twenty-five states participated in the election.

Louisiana and Tennessee had recently been re-captured. They chose presidential electors, but their votes were rejected by Congress due to having recently seceded from the Union. Both states had voted for Lincoln, so it would not have changed the result in any case.

Three new states participated for the first time: Kansas, West Virginia, and Nevada.

Despite Kentucky's state government never fully seceding from the Union, and Kentucky's Confederate Government that was formed at the Russellville Convention being driven from the state in 1862, the Commonwealth had an election participation rate decrease of almost 40% compared to the election of 1860.

McClellan won just three states: Kentucky, Delaware, and his home state of New Jersey. Lincoln won in every state he carried in 1860 except New Jersey, and also carried a state won four years earlier by Stephen Douglas (Missouri), one carried by John C. Breckinridge (Maryland) and all three newly admitted states (Kansas, Nevada and West Virginia). Altogether, 212 electoral votes were counted in Congress for Lincoln – more than enough to win the presidency even if all of the states in rebellion had participated and voted against him. This would be the last election in which a party nominee won completely different states than the previous nominee, with McClellan flipping Kentucky and New Jersey, while having lost Missouri.

Lincoln was highly popular with soldiers and they in turn recommended him to their families back home. The following states allowed soldiers to cast ballots: California, Kansas, Kentucky, Maine, Michigan, Rhode Island, and Wisconsin. Out of the 40,247 army votes cast, Lincoln received 30,503 (75.8%) and McClellan 9,201 (22.9%), with the rest (543 votes) scattering (1.3%). Only soldiers from Kentucky gave McClellan a majority of their votes, and he carried the army vote in the state by a vote of 2,823 (70.3%) to 1,194 (29.7%).

Of the 1,129 counties making returns, Lincoln won in 728 (64.5%), while McClellan carried 400 (35.4%). One county (0.1%) in Iowa split evenly between Lincoln and McClellan.

This was the last election the Republicans won in Maryland until 1896.

Electoral results
Presidential candidate	Party	Home state	Popular vote^{(a)}		Electoral vote^{(a), (b), (c)}	Running mate		
Presidential candidate	Party	Home state	Count	Percentage	Electoral vote^{(a), (b), (c)}	Vice-presidential candidate	Home state	Electoral vote^{(a), (b), (c)}
Abraham Lincoln (incumbent)	National Union	Illinois	2,218,388	55.02%	212^{(b)}	Andrew Johnson	Tennessee	212^{(b)}
George B. McClellan	Democratic	New Jersey	1,812,807	44.96%	21	George H. Pendleton	Ohio	21
Other			658	0.02%	—	Other		—
Total			4,031,887	100%	233^{(b)}			233^{(b)}
Needed to win					118^{(b)}			118^{(b)}

Source (Popular Vote): Leip, David. "1864 Presidential Election Results". Dave Leip's Atlas of U.S. Presidential Elections.
Source (Electoral Vote): "Electoral College Box Scores 1789–1996". National Archives and Records Administration.

Popular vote
Lincoln	55.02%
McClellan	44.96%
Others	0.02%

Electoral vote
Lincoln	91.63%
McClellan	8.93%

^{(a)} The states in rebellion did not participate in the election of 1864.
^{(b)} The 17 electoral votes from Tennessee and Louisiana were rejected. Had they not been rejected, Lincoln would have received 229 electoral votes out of a total of 251 (250 cast), well in excess of the 126 required to win.
^{(c)} One elector from Nevada did not vote.

=== Geography of results ===
==== Cartographic gallery ====
1864 United States Presidential Election mapped by Counties

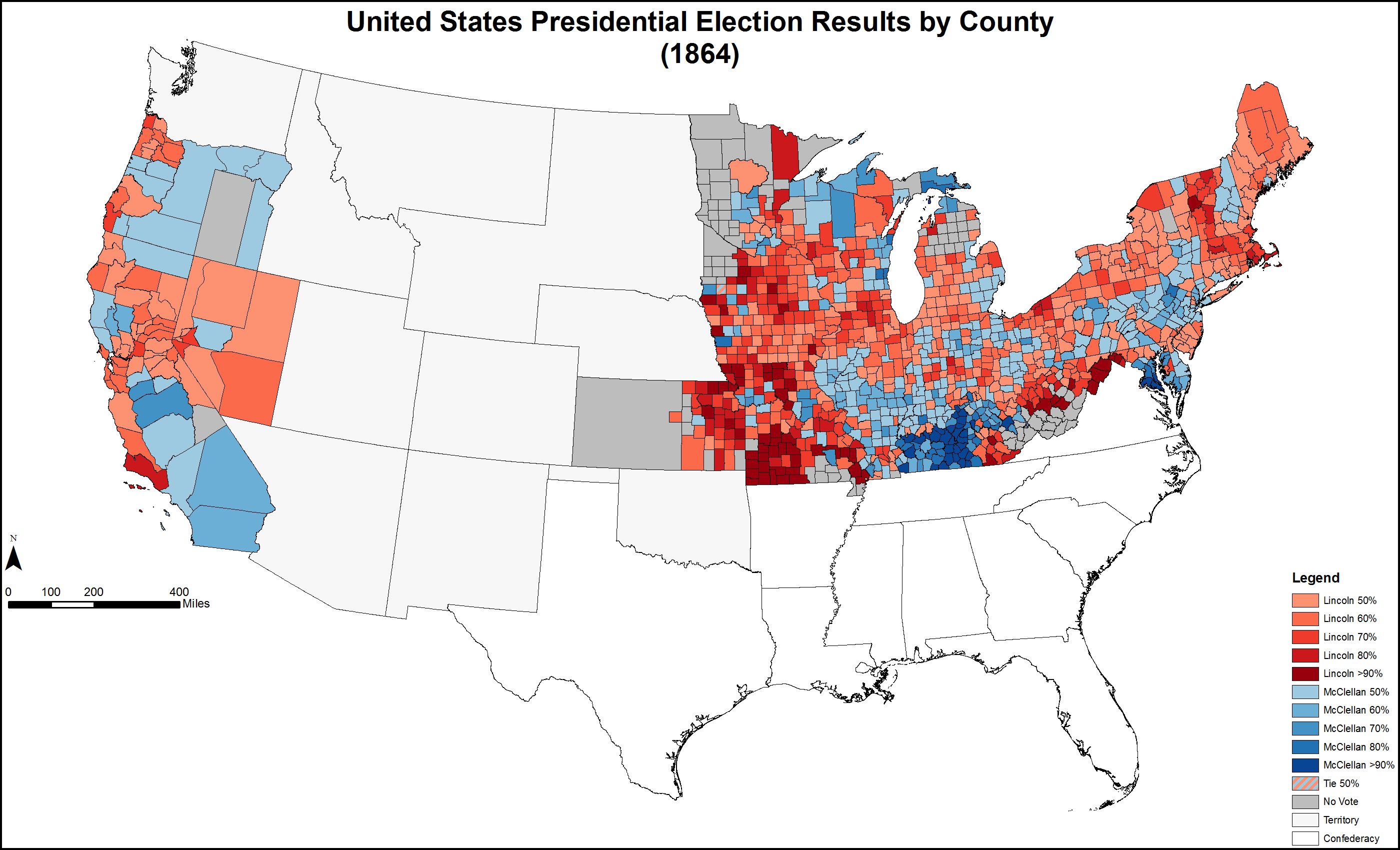
Map of presidential election results by county

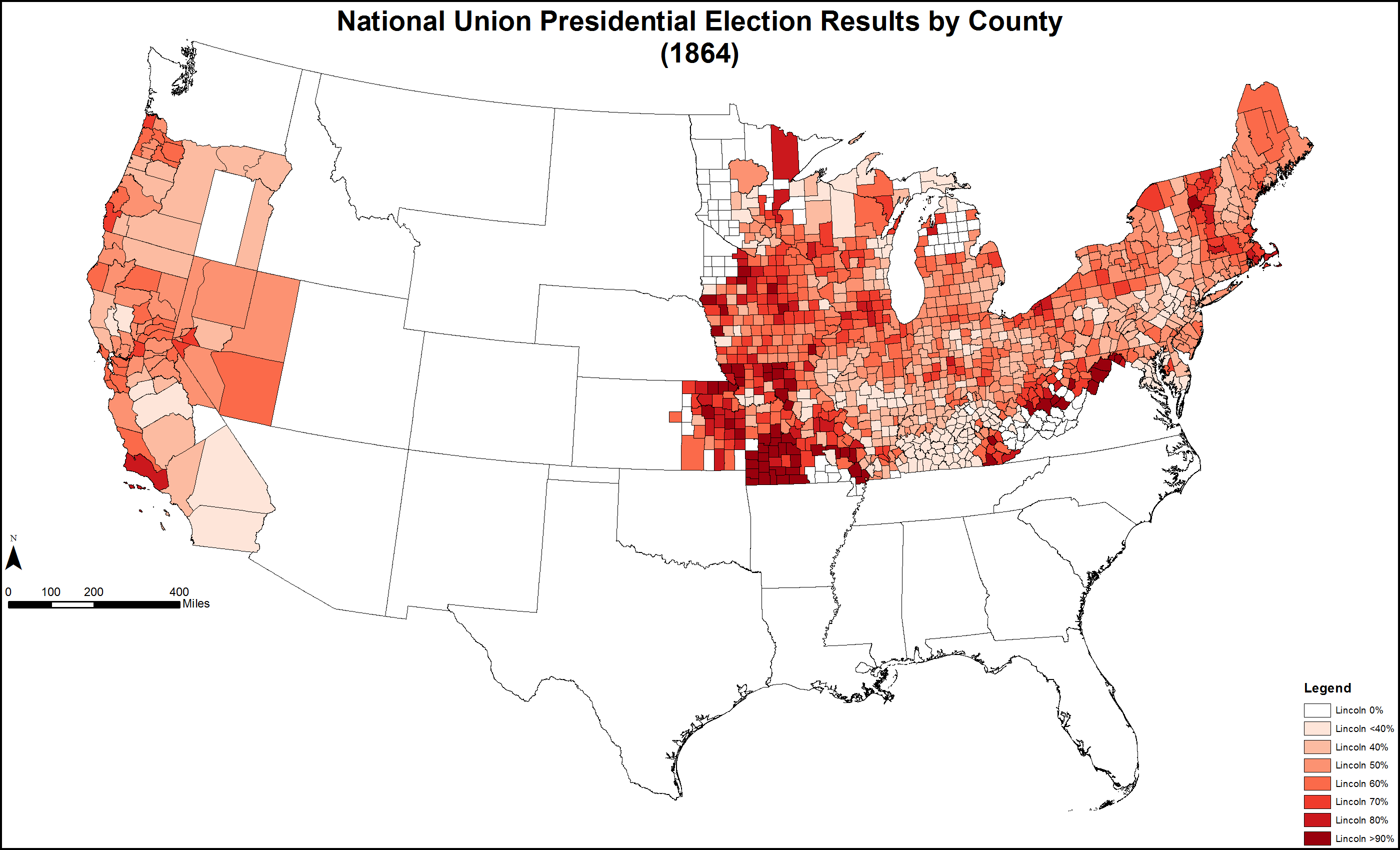
Results explicitly indicating the percentage for the National Union candidate in each county

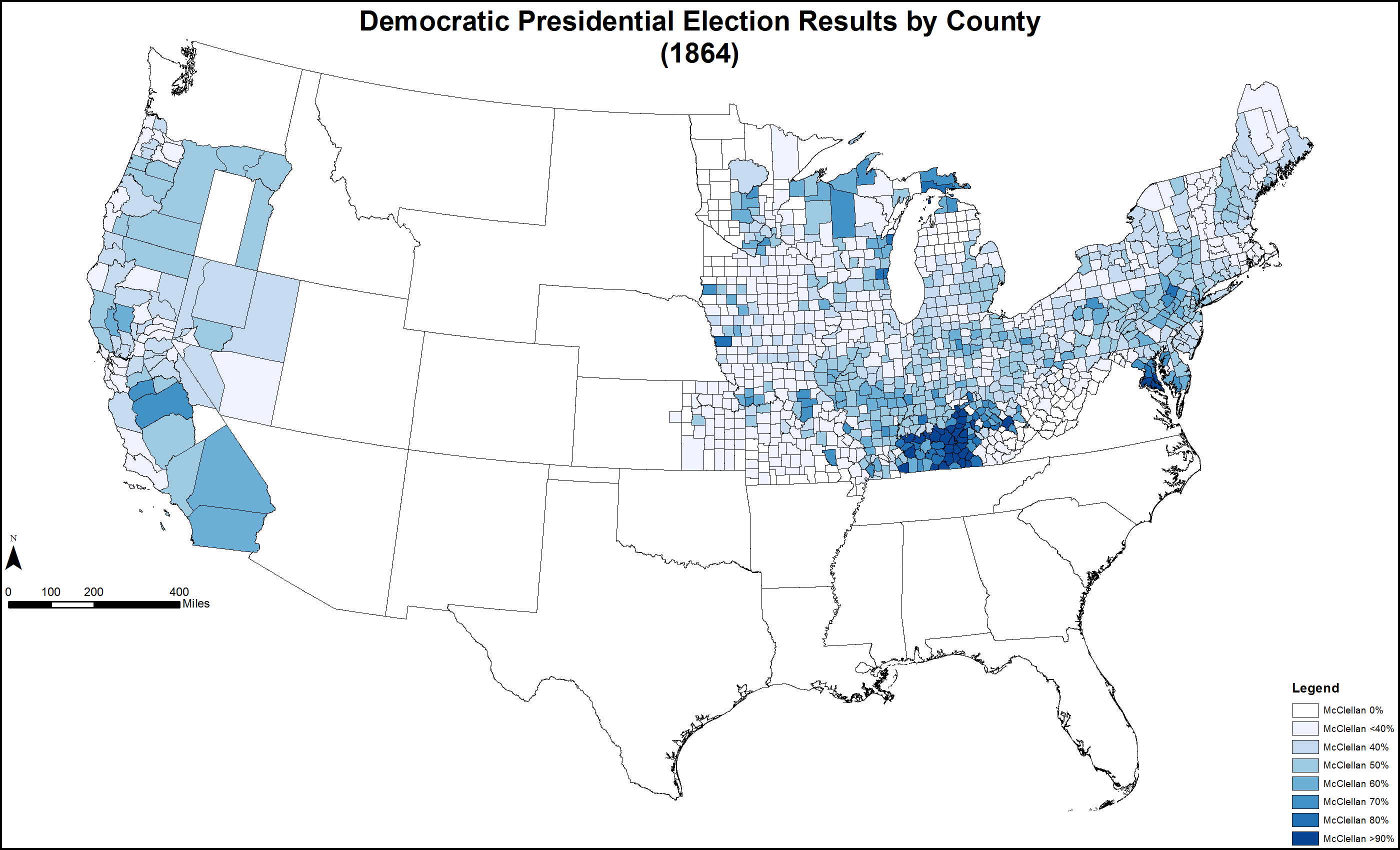
Results explicitly indicating the percentage for the Democratic candidate in each county

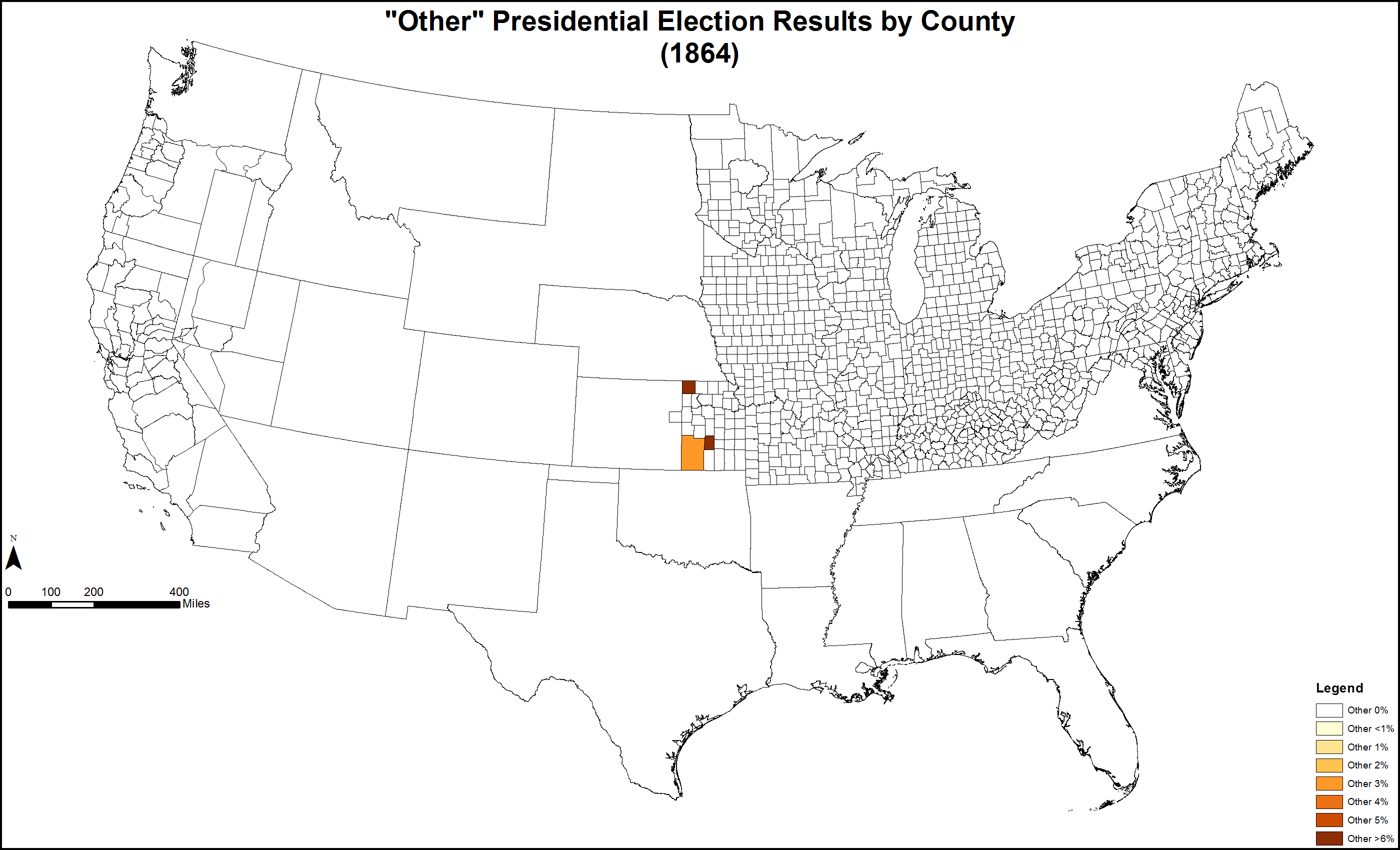
Results explicitly indicating the percentage for "other" candidate(s) in each county

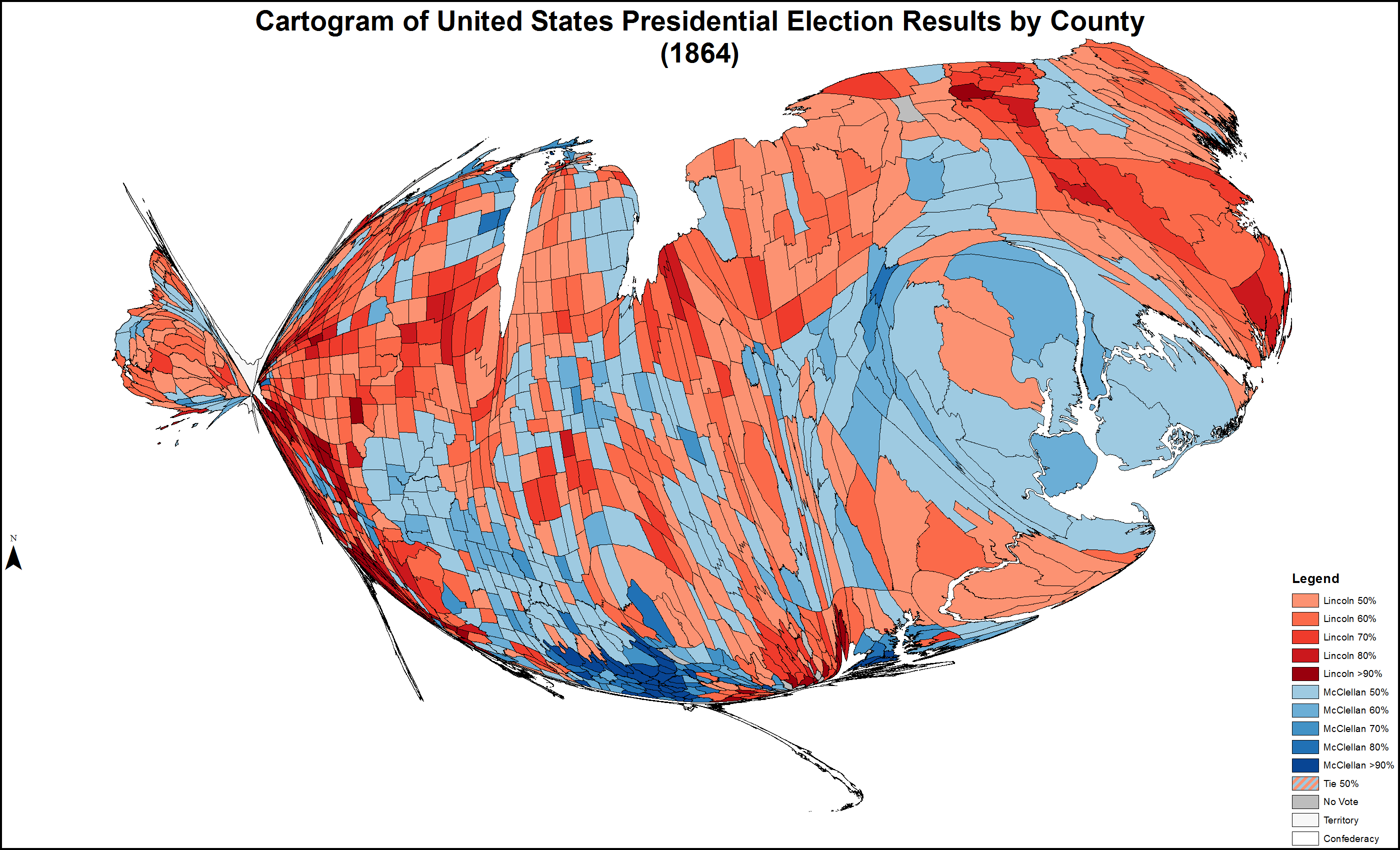
Cartogram of presidential election results by county

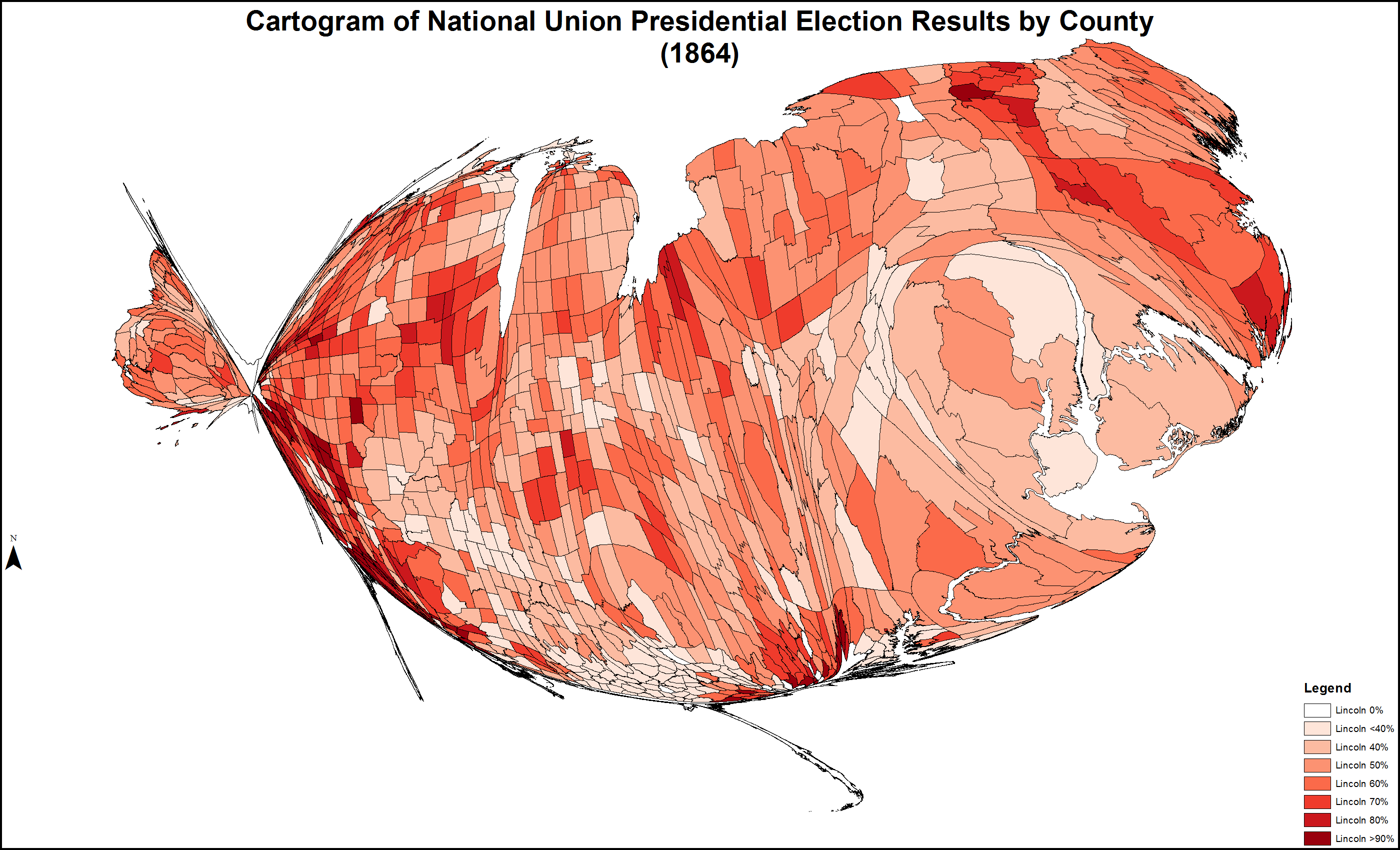
Cartogram of National Union presidential election results by county

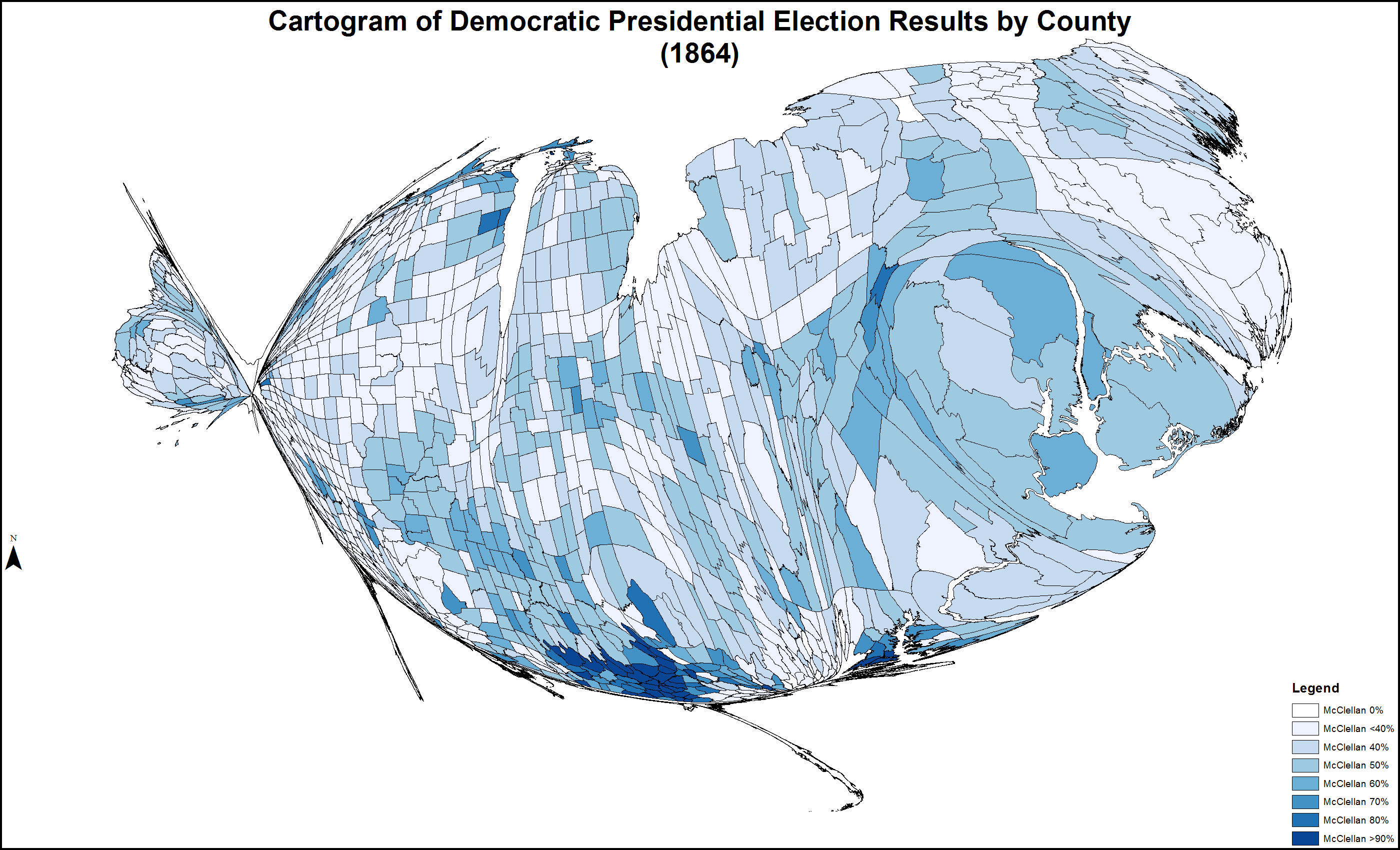
Cartogram of Democratic presidential election results by county

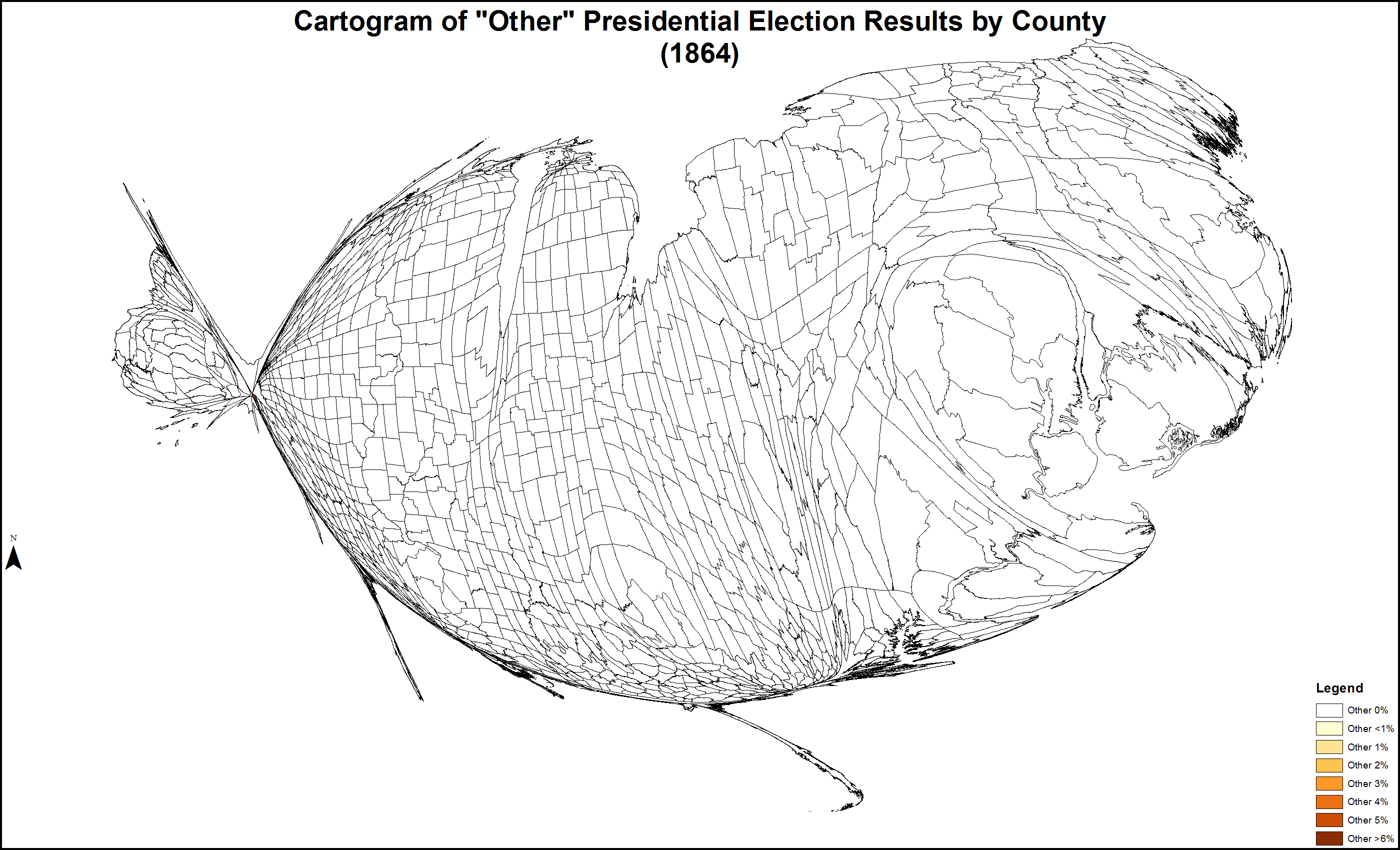
Cartogram of "other" presidential election results by county

==== Results by state ====
- Source (most states): Data from Walter Dean Burnham, Presidential ballots, 1836–1892 (Johns Hopkins University Press, 1955) pp. 247–57.
- Source (Tennessee): contemporary Chicago Tribune newspaper.

States/districts won by McClellan/Pendleton
States/districts won by Lincoln/Johnson

		Abraham Lincoln National Union			George B. McClellan Democratic			Margin		State Total
State	electoral votes	#	%	electoral votes	#	%	electoral votes	#	%	#
California	5	62,140	58.63%	5	43,838	41.36%	–	18,302	17.27%	105,986
Connecticut	6	44,693	51.38%	6	42,288	48.62%	–	2,405	2.76%	86,981
Delaware	3	8,155	48.19%	–	8,767	51.81%	3	-612	-3.62%	16,922
Illinois	16	189,512	54.42%	16	158,724	45.58%	–	30,788	8.84%	348,236
Indiana	13	150,422	53.59%	13	130,233	46.40%	–	20,189	7.19%	280,655
Iowa	8	88,500	64.12%	8	49,525	35.88%	–	38,975	28.24%	138,025
Kansas	3	17,089	79.19%	3	3,836	17.78%	–	13,253	61.41%	21,580
Kentucky	11	27,787	30.17%	–	64,301	69.83%	11	-36,514	-39.66%	92,088
Louisiana	7	no popular vote		7	no popular vote		–	N/A	Votes not counted	
Maine	7	67,805	59.07%	7	46,992	40.93%	–	20,813	18.14%	114,797
Maryland	7	40,153	55.09%	7	32,739	44.91%	–	7,414	10.18%	72,892
Massachusetts	12	126,742	72.22%	12	48,745	27.78%	–	77,997	44.44%	175,490
Michigan	8	79,149	53.60%	8	68,513	46.40%	–	10,636	7.20%	147,662
Minnesota	4	25,055	59.06%	4	17,357	40.94%	–	7,688	18.12%	42,422
Missouri	11	72,750	69.72%	11	31,596	30.28%	–	41,154	39.44%	104,346
Nevada	2	9,826	59.84%	2	6,594	40.16%	–	3,232	19.68%	16,420
New Hampshire	5	36,596	52.56%	5	33,034	47.44%	–	3,562	5.12%	69,630
New Jersey	7	60,723	47.16%	–	68,024	52.84%	7	-7,301	-5.68%	128,747
New York	33	368,735	50.46%	33	361,986	49.54%	–	6,749	0.92%	730,721
Ohio	21	265,654	56.37%	21	205,599	43.63%	–	60,055	12.74%	471,253
Oregon	3	9,888	53.90%	3	8,457	46.10%	–	1,431	7.80%	18,345
Pennsylvania	26	296,391	51.75%	26	276,316	48.25%	–	20,075	3.50%	572,707
Rhode Island	4	13,962	62.24%	4	8,470	37.76%	–	5,492	24.48%	22,432
Tennessee	10	30,000	85.71%	10	5,000	14.29%	–	25,000		35,000
Vermont	5	42,420	76.10%	5	13,322	23.90%	–	29,098	52.20%	55,742
West Virginia	5	23,799	68.24%	5	11,078	31.76%	–	12,721	36.48%	34,877
Wisconsin	8	83,458	55.88%	8	65,884	44.12%	–	17,574	11.80%	149,342
TOTALS:	233	2,211,317	55.03%	212	1,806,227	44.93%	21	405,090	10.10%	4,018,202

Source (Popular Vote): Leip, David. "1864 Presidential Election Results". Dave Leip's Atlas of U.S. Presidential Elections. Source (Electoral Vote): "Electoral College Box Scores 1789–1996". National Archives and Records Administration.

==== States that flipped from Constitutional Union to Democratic ====
- Kentucky

==== States that flipped from Democratic to National Union ====
- Maryland
- Missouri

==== States that flipped from Republican to Democratic ====
- New Jersey (EVs only)

=== Close states ===
States in red were won by Republican Abraham Lincoln; states in blue were won by Democrat George B. McClellan.

State where the margin of victory was under 1% (33 electoral votes):

1. New York 0.92% (6,749 votes)

States where the margin of victory was under 5% (35 electoral votes):

1. Connecticut 2.76% (2,405 votes)
2. Pennsylvania 3.50% (20,075 votes)
3. Delaware 3.62% (612 votes)

States where the margin of victory was under 10% (65 electoral votes):

1. New Hampshire 5.12% (3,562 votes)
2. New Jersey 5.68% (7,301 votes)
3. Indiana 7.19% (20,189 votes)
4. Michigan 7.20% (10,636 votes)
5. Oregon 7.8% (1,431 votes)
6. Illinois 8.8% (30,788 votes) (Tipping-Point State)

== See also ==
- American election campaigns in the 19th century
- Electoral history of Abraham Lincoln
- History of the United States (1849–1865)
- Second inauguration of Abraham Lincoln
- Third Party System
- 1864–65 United States House of Representatives elections

== Works cited ==
- Abramson, Paul; Aldrich, John; Rohde, David (1995). Change and Continuity in the 1992 Elections. CQ Press. ISBN 0871878399.
