= 1864 United States presidential election in Tennessee =

- November 8, 1864

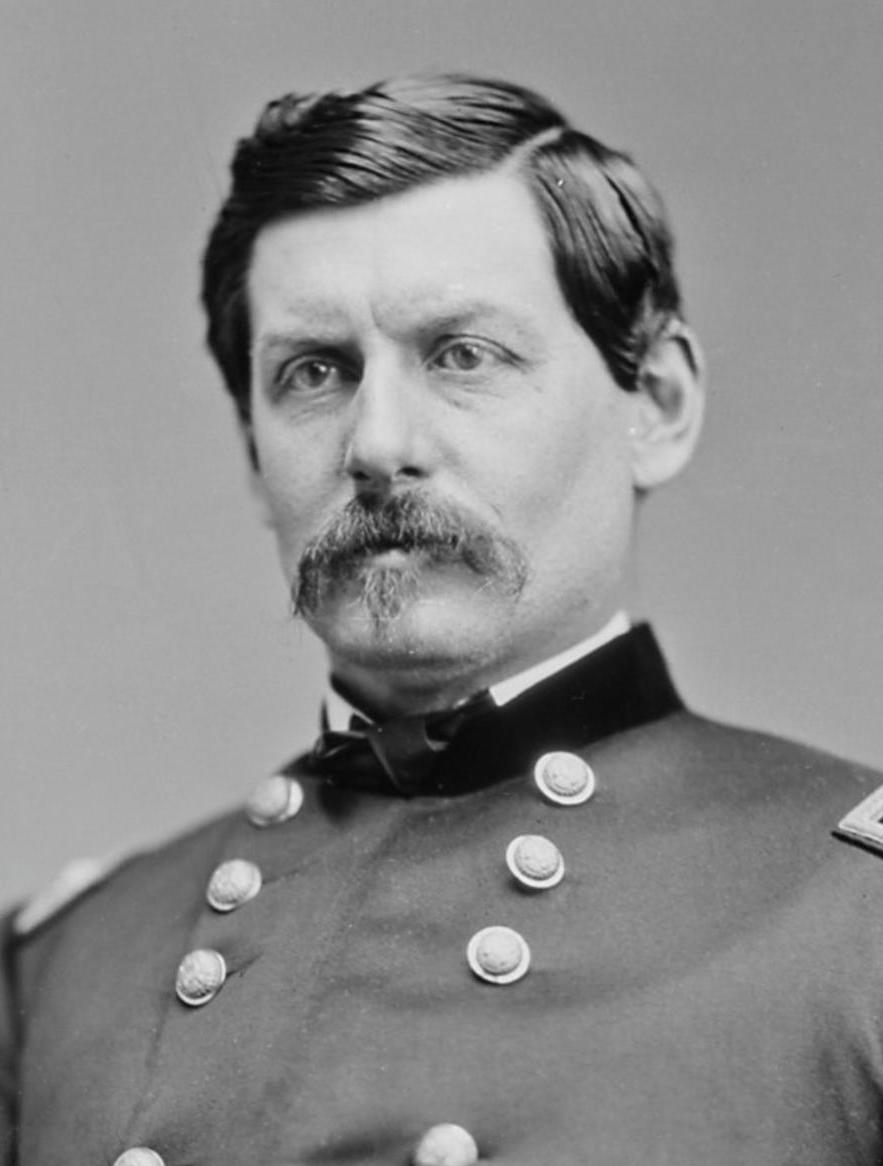
Nominee	Abraham Lincoln	George B. McClellan
Party	National Union	Democratic
Home state	Illinois	New Jersey
Running mate	Andrew Johnson	George H. Pendleton
Electoral vote	0 (+10 invalidated) (Note: Elections were held in the Union-occupied military districts in the states of Louisiana and Tennessee, but no electoral votes were counted from them.)	0
Popular vote	≈30,000	≈5,000
Percentage	≈86%	≈14%
- County results unknown due to destroyed ballot boxes
President before election
Abraham Lincoln
Republican
Elected President
Abraham Lincoln
National Union

The 1864 United States presidential election in Tennessee took place on November 8, 1864, as part of the 1864 United States presidential election. The state legislature chose 10 electors to the Electoral College, who voted for president and vice president. However, due to Tennessee's prior secession and allegiance to the Confederacy, all votes from the state were rejected.

Tennessee voted for the National Union candidate, incumbent Republican President Abraham Lincoln. The state (along with Louisiana) chose electors for the election after being captured early in the American Civil War. However, due to issues related to the Civil War, their votes were rejected.

The Chicago Tribune reported that about 30,000 votes were cast for Lincoln and 5,000 for Democratic candidate George B. McClellan, but that many ballot boxes were destroyed by Confederate guerrillas and thus the exact number was not known. In marked contrast, Anne H. Hopkins and William Lyons claim Lincoln won 99.2% of 17,264 votes cast in Tennessee, without specifying the exact number of votes for either ticket.

If these figures are taken to be correct or even remotely close to correct, then Lincoln's share of the total vote is the best Republican performance ever in Tennessee for a presidential election.

== See also ==
- United States presidential elections in Tennessee
- 1864 United States presidential election in Louisiana - The other state during the 1864 presidential election where the votes were rejected
