= George McClellan 1864 presidential campaign =

American political campaign

George McClellan for President
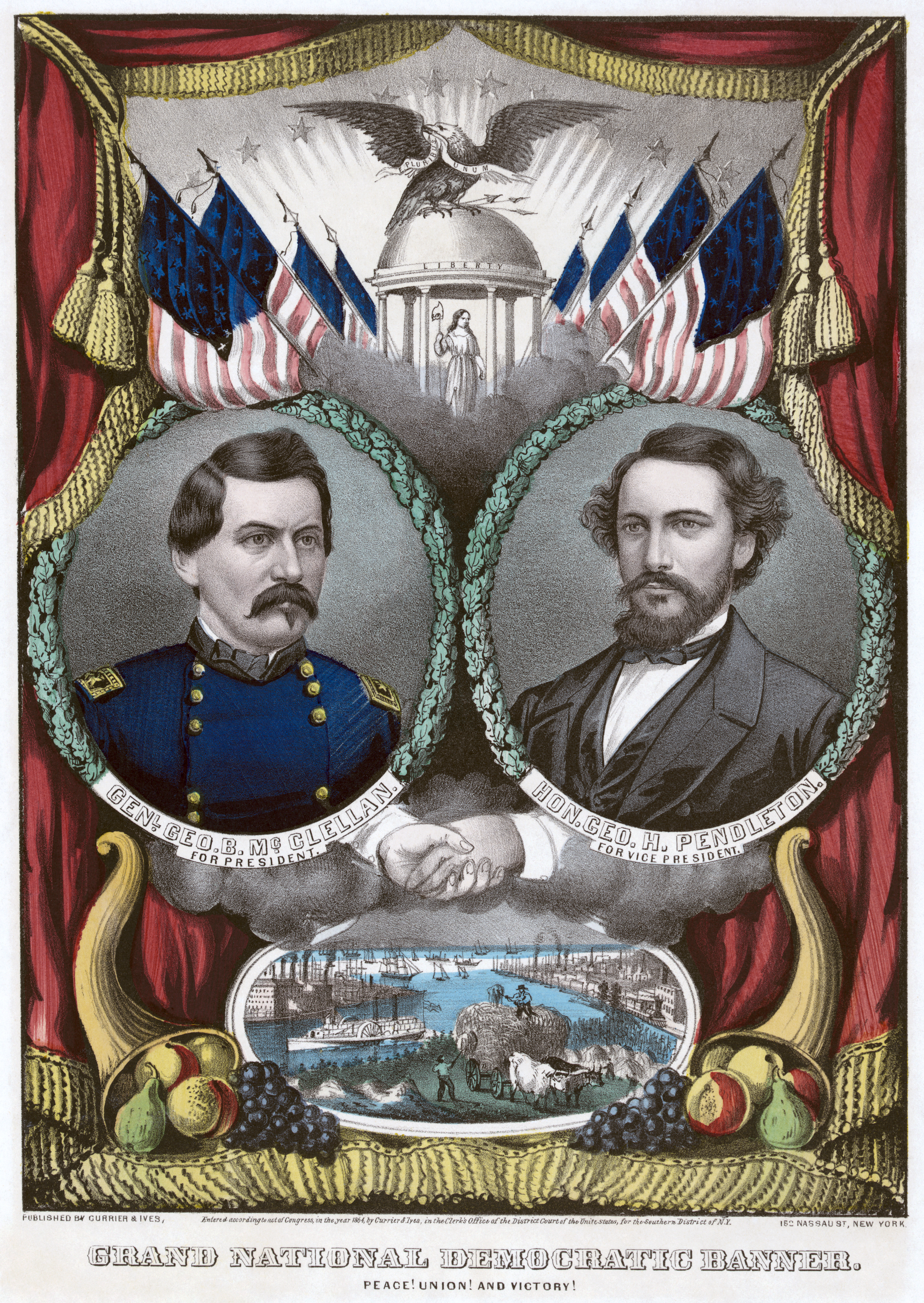
- Campaign: U.S. presidential election, 1864
- Candidate: George McClellan; 4th Commanding General of the United States Army (1861–1862); George Pendleton; U.S. Representative for Ohio's 1st district (1857–1865)
- Affiliation: Democratic Party
- Status: Lost general election: November 8, 1864
- Slogan(s): An honorable, permanent and happy peace.

In the 1864 U.S. presidential election, the Democrats nominated Union Army General George McClellan for U.S. President and Ohio U.S. Representative George Pendleton (who later became notable for the Pendleton Act) for U.S. Vice President. During the campaign, McClellan vowed to do a better job of prosecuting the Union Army effort in the American Civil War than incumbent U.S. President Abraham Lincoln did. Ultimately, the McClellan-Pendleton ticket lost to the National Union ticket of Abraham Lincoln and former U.S. Senator Andrew Johnson.

== 1864 Democratic National Convention ==
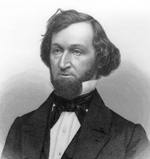
Connecticut Governor Thomas Seymour ran against McClellan for the 1864 Democratic presidential nomination and lost.

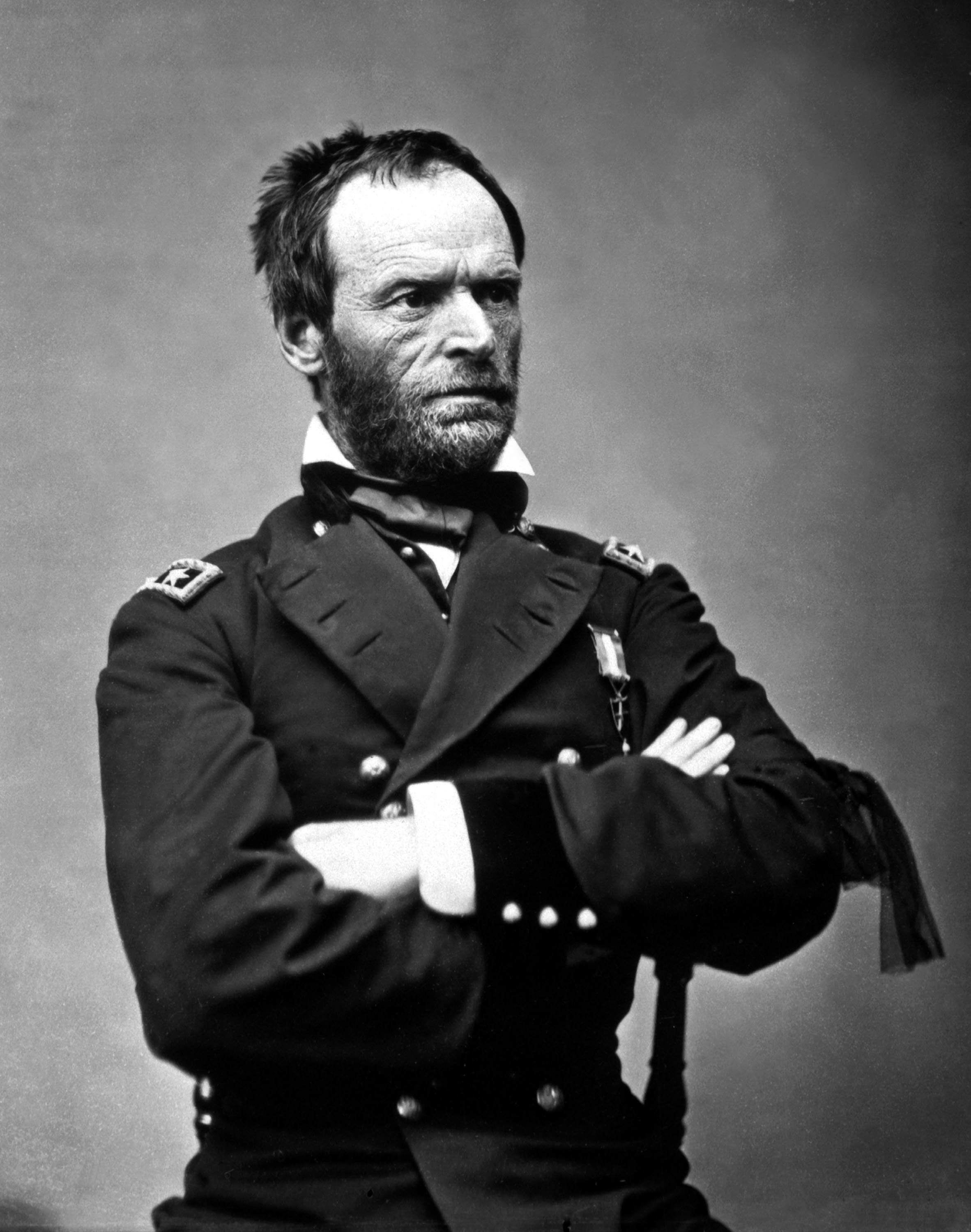
General Sherman's capture of Atlanta in 1864 reduced McClellan's chances of winning the U.S. presidency that year.

A map of the results of the 1864 U.S. presidential election.

By the summer of 1864, the Civil War had gone on for over three years. Over 250,000 Union soldiers had been killed, with many more maimed or crippled. A Union victory was not yet in sight. Democrats were energized by what they saw as "death, debt, and destruction with no end in sight" and also hoped to capitalize on public opposition to various policies of incumbent U.S. President Abraham Lincoln such as "emancipation, the military draft, the use of black troops, and violations of civil liberties." Democrats also argued that the Republicans were advocating in favor of miscegenation (sexual relations and marriage between people of different races) trying to destroy the traditional race relations in the United States.

The delegates at the 1864 Democratic National Convention adopted proposals by former Congressman Clement Vallandigham and Congressman Fernando Wood for a cease-fire and a negotiated settlement with the Confederacy to end the American Civil War. However, the delegates also chose War Democrat George McClellan as their presidential nominee. In his fight for the Democratic nomination, McClellan beat out New York Governor Horatio Seymour (who would become the Democratic presidential nominee himself just four years later) and former Connecticut Governor Thomas Seymour, both of whom ran as peace candidates. Once former Treasury Secretary James Guthrie withdrew from consideration, the Democratic vice presidential nomination went to Ohio Congressman George Pendleton.

== The campaign ==
After he captured the Democratic presidential nomination, McClellan repudiated the peace plank of the Democratic platform and instead vowed to continue the war effort and to do a better job with this than the incumbent Lincoln Administration was doing. McClellan emphasized the fact that he previously led the Union military effort in the American Civil War and that he was and remains committed to "the restoration of the Union in all its integrity" due to his belief that the massive sacrifices that the Union endured during this war should not be in vain. Incumbent U.S. President Abraham Lincoln worried about his reelection chances and was afraid that if McClellan won the election, the Copperheads (the Peace faction of the Democratic Party) would successfully pressure McClellan to recant his campaign promise to continue the war. Thus, Lincoln made his Cabinet secretly promise to cooperate with McClellan if he won the election to win the war by the time that McClellan will be inaugurated. Fortunately for Lincoln, the tide of the war effort began to turn in the Union's favor in the autumn of 1864 as a result of Union General William Tecumseh Sherman's capture of Atlanta on September 2 as well as Sherman's subsequent military successes. These successes increased Lincoln's popularity and reduced McClellan's chances of defeating Lincoln in November 1864.

== Results ==
With a voter turnout of 78%, incumbent U.S. President Abraham Lincoln won a decisive victory in the November general election. Lincoln won 55% of the popular vote to McClellan's 45% and received over 90% of the total electoral votes (212 for Lincoln versus 21 for McClellan). Lincoln's popular vote victory was the largest since 1828 and wouldn't be surpassed again until 1872. In this election, McClellan did the best in the cities and among Irish-Americans and German-Americans (many of whom were immigrants). Meanwhile, Lincoln received the votes of 78% of all Union soldiers and sailors—something that, while not being decisive in Lincoln's victory—did help Republicans win some additional seats in the U.S. Congress and recapture control of several state legislatures. However, McClellan could bask in the fact that he won 48% of the total vote in a bloc of U.S. states stretching from Connecticut to Illinois (Lincoln's home state), that Lincoln underperformed in 1864 relative to 1860 in several crucial U.S. states (such as New York, Pennsylvania, and Indiana), and that the Republicans lost the Governorship in his (McClellan's) home state of New Jersey.
