= 1864 United States presidential election in Louisiana =

- November 8, 1864
Nominee	Abraham Lincoln
Party	National Union
Home state	Illinois
Running mate	Andrew Johnson
Electoral vote	0 (+7 invalidated) (Note: Elections were held in the Union-occupied military districts in the states of Louisiana and Tennessee, but no electoral votes were counted from them.)
President before election
Abraham Lincoln
Republican
Elected President
Abraham Lincoln
National Union

The 1864 United States presidential election in Louisiana took place on November 8, 1864, as part of the 1864 United States presidential election.

Louisiana voted for incumbent Republican President Abraham Lincoln. The state (along with Tennessee) chose electors for the election after being captured early in the American Civil War. However, due to war issues, its votes were rejected.

== See also ==
- United States presidential elections in Louisiana
- 1864 United States presidential election in Tennessee - The other state during the 1864 presidential election where the votes were rejected
