= Commanding General of the United States Army =

Extinct military position in the US

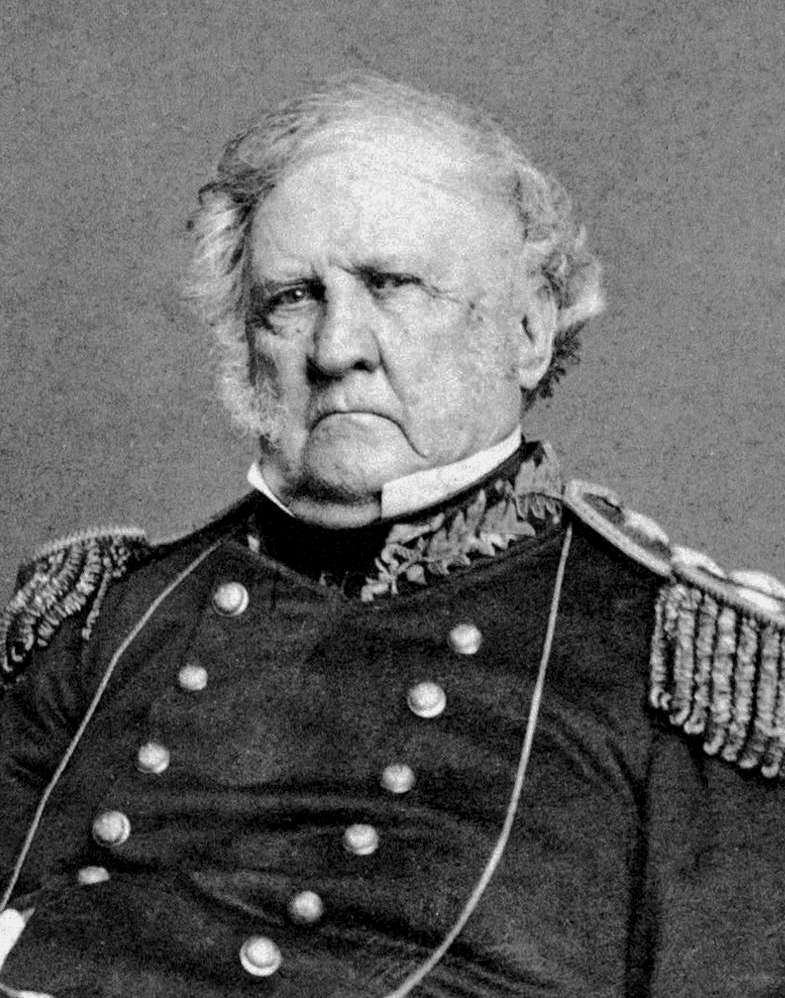
- Longest serving Brevet LTG Winfield Scott; 5 July 1841 – 1 November 1861
- United States Army; United States Department of War
- Type: Senior-most officer
- Reports to: The secretary of war
- Seat: Several HQs (Washington)
- Appointer: The president; with Congress advice and consent
- Term length: No fixed term
- Constituting instrument: An act of the Second Continental Congress
- Formation: 15 June 1775; June 1821
- First holder: GEN George Washington as Commander-in-Chief of the Continental Army; MG Jacob Brown as Commanding General of the United States Army
- Final holder: LTG Nelson A. Miles
- Abolished: 8 August 1903
- Succession: Chief of Staff of the Army

Commanding General of the United States Army was the title given to the service chief and highest-ranking officer of the United States Army (and its predecessor the Continental Army), prior to the establishment of the chief of staff of the United States Army in 1903.

During the American Revolutionary War (1775–1783), the title was Commander-in-Chief of the Continental Army. Between 1783 and 1821, there was no true overall commander for the army. Historians use the term Senior Officer of the United States Army to refer to the individual that held the highest rank by virtue of his date of commission, though the authority they exerted depended on the will of the secretary of war (senior member of the President's Cabinet). In 1821, Secretary John C. Calhoun appointed Jacob Brown as the Commanding General of the United States Army, thus establishing the office of Commanding General. The office was often referred to by various other titles, such as "Major General Commanding the Army" or "General-in-Chief".

From 1789 until its abolition in 1903, the position of commanding general was legally subordinate to the secretary of war, and was replaced by the creation of the statutory chief of staff of the Army by an act of Congress in 1903, under the 26th president Theodore Roosevelt (1901–1909).

== Officeholders ==
† denotes people who died in office.

=== Commander-in-Chief of the Continental Army (1775–1783) ===
No.	Portrait	Commander-in-Chief	Took office	Left office	Time in office	Notes
1	George Washington	General (Note: Promoted posthumously to General of the Armies in 1976, by an Act of Congress (Public Law 94-479) as part of the United States Bicentennial.); George Washington (1732–1799)	15 June 1775	23 December 1783	8 years, 191 days	Appointed by the Second Continental Congress, after being nominated by Samuel Adams and John Adams. Resigned to the Congress of the Confederation, at the end of the American Revolutionary War.

=== Senior Officer of the United States Army (1783–1821) ===
No.	Portrait	Senior Officer	Took office	Left office	Time in office	Notes
1	Henry Knox	Major General; Henry Knox (1750–1806)	23 December 1783	20 June 1784	180 days	Resigned to begin career farming and developing land in Maine; appointed Secretary of War under Articles of Confederation in 1785.
2	John Doughty	Brevet Major; John Doughty (1754–1826)	20 June 1784	12 August 1784	53 days	Served when the Army was reduced to only 80 soldiers. Lowest ranking individual ever to command the U.S. Army.
3	Josiah Harmar	Brevet Brigadier General; Josiah Harmar (1753–1813)	12 August 1784	4 March 1791	6 years, 204 days	Served at the beginning of the Northwest Indian War with the Northwestern Confederacy. Removed by President George Washington in the aftermath of the Harmar campaign.
4	Arthur St. Clair	Major General; Arthur St. Clair (1736–1818)	4 March 1791	5 March 1792	1 year, 1 day	Simultaneously served as Governor of the Northwest Territory (1787–1802). Resigned as Senior Officer at the request of President George Washington, in the aftermath of St. Clair's defeat.
5	Anthony Wayne	Major General; Anthony Wayne (1745–1796)	13 April 1792	15 December 1796 †	4 years, 246 days	Commanded the Legion of the United States during the Northwest Indian War and negotiated the Treaty of Greenville with the Northwestern Confederacy after the Battle of Fallen Timbers.
6	James Wilkinson	Brigadier General; James Wilkinson (1757–1825)	15 December 1796	13 July 1798	1 year, 210 days	Commanded the Legion of the United States at the start of the Quasi War. Responsible for establishing Reserve Corps in the Ohio River Valley and the lower Mississippi River Valley to be deployed in the event of war with France or Spain. Later discovered by historian Charles Gayarré to have been a Spanish spy.
7	George Washington	Lieutenant General; George Washington (1732–1799)	13 July 1798	14 December 1799 †	1 year, 154 days	Previously served as President of the United States (1789–1797). Appointed by President Adams during the Quasi-War against the French Republic. Did not actively command the Army during this period but was prepared to lead it if the need arose.
8	Alexander Hamilton	Major General; Alexander Hamilton (1755/1757–1804)	14 December 1799	15 June 1800	183 days	Previously served as Secretary of the Treasury (1789–1795). Served as Inspector General of the Army with rank of major general, with effective command-and-control during the Quasi-War from 19 July 1798. Became Senior Officer in the Army after the death of Washington.
6	James Wilkinson	Brigadier General (Note: Promoted to major general during the War of 1812 and retired on 15 June 1815.); James Wilkinson (1757–1825)	15 June 1800	27 January 1812	11 years, 226 days	Commanded during the Louisiana Purchase and the Lewis and Clark Expedition. Known for suppressing the Burr conspiracy.
9	Henry Dearborn	Major General; Henry Dearborn (1751–1829)	27 January 1812	15 June 1815	3 years, 139 days	Previously served as Secretary of War (1801–1809). Last American Revolutionary War veteran to serve as Senior Officer. Served as the Commanding General at the beginning of the War of 1812. Known for authorizing the American invasion of Lower Canada, including the Battle of York. Reassigned to administrative post in New York City after achieving few victories.
10	Jacob Brown	Major General; Jacob Brown (1775–1828)	15 June 1815	June 1821	5 years, 351 days	Appointed Commanding General of the Army after successes on the Northwestern front of the War of 1812. Presided over a reduction in the size of the U.S. Army in the 1810s. Created the United States's first military colleges and the General Recruiting Service.

=== Commanding General of the United States Army (1821–1903) ===
No.	Portrait	Commanding General	Took office	Left office	Time in office	Notes
1	Jacob Brown	Major General; Jacob Brown (1775–1828)	June 1821	24 February 1828 †	6 years, 268 days	.
2	Alexander Macomb	Major General; Alexander Macomb (1782–1841)	29 May 1828	25 June 1841 †	13 years, 27 days	Commanding general at the Battle of Plattsburgh. Advocated expanding the U.S. Army during his tenure.
3	Winfield Scott	Brevet Lieutenant General; Winfield Scott (1786–1866)	5 July 1841	1 November 1861	20 years, 119 days	Personally commanded the Army in the Battle for Mexico City in 1847, during the Mexican–American War. Runner-up in the 1852 presidential election. Commanded the Union Army at the beginning of the American Civil War. Developed the Anaconda Plan to defeat the Confederacy and recommended expanding the Regular Army rather than relying on militia. Resigned after the Union defeat at the First Battle of Bull Run. Age 75 at his retirement, Scott was the oldest person to serve as Commanding General.
4	George B. McClellan	Major General; George B. McClellan (1826–1885)	1 November 1861	11 March 1862	130 days	Simultaneously served as Commander of the Army of the Potomac. Removed by President Abraham Lincoln after the Peninsula campaign and McClellan's failure to pursue the Army of Northern Virginia after the Battle of Antietam. Later unsuccessfully campaigned with the Democratic Party in the 1864 election.
Position vacant (11 March 1862 – 23 July 1862) (Note: Eicher, Civil War High Commands. The gap from 11 March 1862 to 23 July 1862 was filled with direct control of the Army by President Abraham Lincoln and Secretary of War Edwin Stanton, with the help of an unofficial "War Board" that was established on 17 March 1862. The board consisted of Ethan A. Hitchcock, the chairman, with Department of War bureau chiefs Lorenzo Thomas, Montgomery C. Meigs, Joseph G. Totten, James W. Ripley, and Joseph P. Taylor.)
5	Henry Halleck	Major General; Henry Halleck (1815–1872)	23 July 1862	9 March 1864	1 year, 230 days	Reassigned as the Army's chief of staff, subordinate to Grant.
6	Ulysses S. Grant	General of the Army (Note: Promoted posthumously to General of the Armies in 2024, in compliance with Section 583 of the NDAA 2023.); Ulysses S. Grant (1822–1885)	9 March 1864	4 March 1869	4 years, 360 days	Appointed after successes in the Battle of Vicksburg and the Chattanooga campaign. When appointed, Grant served in the field, his headquarters attached to the Army of the Potomac. Defeated the Army of Northern Virginia at the Overland Campaign and the Petersburg campaign. Accepted General Robert E. Lee's surrender at the Battle of Appomattox. Resigned to become the 18th president of the United States after winning the 1868 election. (1869–1877).
7	William Tecumseh Sherman	General of the Army; William Tecumseh Sherman (1820–1891)	8 March 1869	1 November 1883	14 years, 238 days	Known for leading the March to the Sea and the Campaign of the Carolinas during the American Civil War. Served as commanding general during the Modoc War, the Great Sioux War of 1876, and the Nez Perce War. Resigned position; retired upon reaching mandatory retirement age of 64 in 1884.
8	Philip Sheridan	General of the Army; Philip Sheridan (1831–1888)	1 November 1883	5 August 1888 †	4 years, 278 days	Known for service in the American Civil War, Reconstruction, and the Indian Wars. Influential in establishment of Yellowstone National Park.
9	John Schofield	Lieutenant General; John Schofield (1831–1906)	14 August 1888	29 September 1895	7 years, 46 days	Former military commander during the American Civil War and Reconstruction. Advised the government during the Pullman Strike. Retired upon reaching mandatory retirement age of 64.
10	Nelson A. Miles	Lieutenant General; Nelson A. Miles (1839–1925)	5 October 1895	8 August 1903	7 years, 307 days	Served as commanding general during the Spanish–American War and the Army beef scandal. Retired upon reaching mandatory retirement age of 64. Position replaced with the Army Chief of Staff upon Miles's retirement.

== See also ==
- United States military seniority

== Bibliography ==
- Historical Resources Branch; United States Army Center of Military History.
- Eicher, John H.; Eicher, David J. (2001). Civil War High Commands. Stanford University Press. ISBN 0-8047-3641-3.
- Bell, William Gardner (2005). Commanding Generals and Chiefs of Staff 1775–2005: Portraits and Biographical Sketches. Washington, D.C.: United States Army Center of Military History. Archived from the original on 10 April 2021.
- King, Archibald (1960) [1949]. Command of the Army (PDF). Military Affairs. Charlottesville, Virginia: The Judge Advocate General's School, U.S. Army.
