= Cedar Grove =

Cedar Grove may refer to:

== Towns, cities, and neighborhoods ==
=== United States ===
- Cedar Grove, Fresno County, California
- Cedar Grove, Florida
- Cedar Grove, Laurens County, Georgia
- Cedar Grove, Walker County, Georgia
- Cedar Grove, Indiana
- Cedar Grove, Bullitt County, Kentucky
- Cedar Grove, Shreveport, Louisiana
- Cedar Grove, Mississippi
- Cedargrove, Missouri
- Cedar Grove, Mercer County, New Jersey
- Cedar Grove, Essex County, New Jersey
- Cedar Grove, New Mexico
- Cedar Grove, Orange County, North Carolina
- Cedar Grove, Randolph County, North Carolina
- Cedar Grove, Tennessee (disambiguation), several places
- Cedar Grove, Texas
- Cedar Grove, Frederick County, Virginia
- Cedar Grove, West Virginia
- Cedar Grove, Wisconsin

=== Elsewhere ===
- Cedar Grove, Antigua and Barbuda, on the island of Antigua
- Cedar Grove, Queensland, Australia
- Cedar Grove, Ontario, Canada

== Buildings and other properties ==
=== Australia ===
- Cedar Grove Weir, on the Logan River, Queensland

=== United States ===
- Cedar Grove Plantation, a historic plantation house near Faunsdale, Alabama
- Susina Plantation, a historic plantation house also known as Cedar Grove, near Thomasville, Georgia
- Cedar Grove (Baltimore, Maryland), a historic home
- Cedar Grove (La Plata, Maryland), a historic home
- Cedar Grove (Williamsport, Maryland), a historic home
- Thomas Cole House or Cedar Grove, a National Historic Landmark that includes the home and the studio of painter Thomas Cole
- Cedar Grove (Oak Grove, Kentucky), listed on the National Register of Historic Places in Christian County, Kentucky
- Cedar Grove (Franklin, Missouri), a historic home
- Cedar Grove (Natchez, Mississippi), a historic plantation house
- Cedar Grove (Vicksburg, Mississippi), listed on the National Register of Historic Places in Warren County, Mississippi
- Cedar Grove Place, a historic building in Church Hill, Mississippi
- Cedar Grove (Huntersville, North Carolina), a historic plantation house
- Cedar Grove Mansion, a historic home in Philadelphia
- Cedar Grove (Edgefield, South Carolina), a historic plantation house
- Cedar Grove (Brownsville, Tennessee), a historic cottage
- Cedar Grove (Clarksville, Virginia), a historic plantation house
- Cedar Grove (Halifax County, Virginia), a historic farm property
- Cedar Grove (Providence Forge, Virginia), a historic plantation house
- Cedar Grove (Cedar Grove, West Virginia), a historic home

== Organizations ==
- Cedar Grove Productions, a media production company in Los Angeles, California
- Cedar Grove OnStage, a theatre organization in Los Angeles, California

== Transportation ==
- Cedar Grove station, in Boston, Massachusetts, United States
- Cedar Grove Transit Station, in Eagan, Minnesota, United States

== Other uses ==
- Cedar Grove (album)
- Cedar Grove Cemetery (disambiguation)
- Cedar Grove High School (disambiguation)
- Cedar Grove Elementary, an elementary school in Williamston, South Carolina
