= Sullivan County, Tennessee =

County in Tennessee, United States

- County
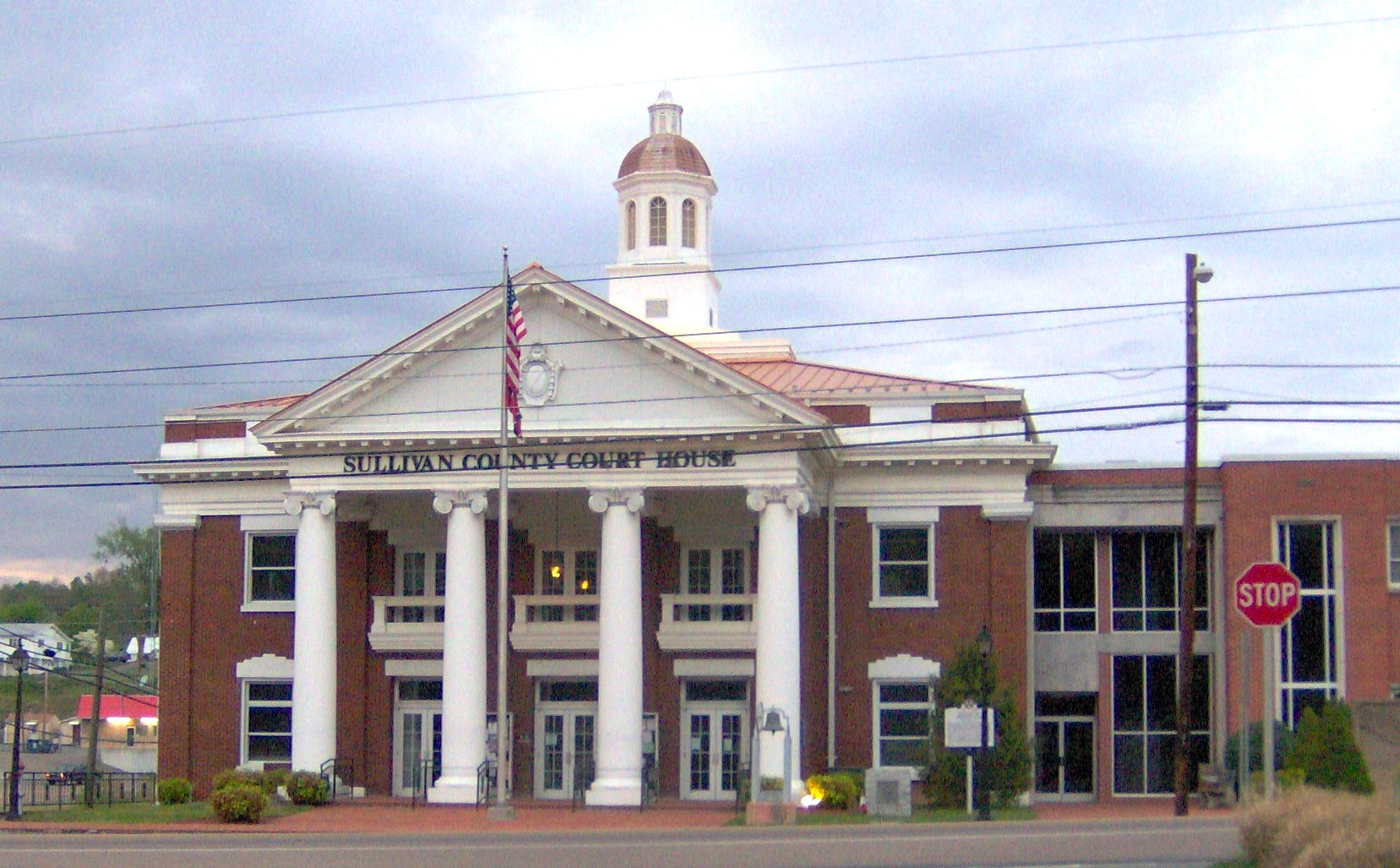
- Sullivan County Courthouse in Blountville

- Location within the U.S. state of Tennessee
- Coordinates: 36°31′N 82°18′W
- Country: United States
- State: Tennessee
- Founded: 1779
- Named for: John Sullivan
- Seat: Blountville
- Largest city: Kingsport

Government
  - County Mayor: Richard Venable (R)

Area
  - Total: 430 sq mi (1,100 km^{2})
  - Land: 413 sq mi (1,070 km^{2})
  - Water: 16 sq mi (41 km^{2}) 3.8%

Population (2020)
  - Total: 158,163
  - Estimate (2025): 163,759 ▲
  - Density: 383/sq mi (148/km^{2})
- Time zone: UTC−5 (Eastern)
  - Summer (DST): UTC−4 (EDT)
- Congressional district: 1st
- Website: sullivancountytn.gov

Sullivan County is a county located in the U.S. state of Tennessee on its northeast border. As of the 2020 census, the population was 158,163. Its county seat is Blountville. Sullivan County is part of the Kingsport–Bristol TN–VA Metropolitan Statistical Area, which is a component of the Kingsport–Johnson City–Bristol, TN–VA Combined Statistical Area, commonly known as the "Tri-Cities" region. Sullivan is Tennessee's second-oldest county; it was established in 1779 when the area was still part of North Carolina. From 1784 to 1788, it was part of the extra-legal State of Franklin.

== History ==
Sullivan County was created in 1779 from a portion of Washington County, and named for John Sullivan, a Patriot general in the Revolutionary War. Long Island of the Holston in Kingsport was long an important center for the Cherokee, who occupied much of this territory. Later in 1761 the British colonists built Fort Robinson on Long Island, following the fall of Fort Loudoun further to the south. This attracted other settlers, and the Sullivan area became one of the earliest areas of Tennessee to be settled by European Americans.

As political tensions rose prior to the American Civil War, Sullivan County was one of the few East Tennessee counties to support secession. It became known as the Little Confederacy. In Tennessee's June 1861 referendum, the county voted 1,586 to 627 in favor of secession.

== Geography ==
According to the U.S. Census Bureau, the county has a total area of 430 square miles (1,100 km^{2}), of which 413 square miles (1,070 km^{2}) is land and 16 square miles (41 km^{2}) (3.8%) is water. The western portion of the county lies within the Ridge-and-Valley Appalachians, which are characterized by long, narrow ridges roughly oriented northeast-to-southwest. The northeastern end of Bays Mountain, part of the Ridge-and-Valley range, rises southwest of Kingsport. The eastern portion of the county lies within the Blue Ridge Mountains. Holston Mountain, which at 4,284 feet (1,306 m) is the highest point in Sullivan, straddles the county's eastern boundary with Johnson County.

In Kingsport, the South Fork Holston River and the North Fork Holston River join to form the Holston River, one of the tributaries of the Tennessee River. The Watauga River, a tributary of the South Fork Holston, forms part of Sullivan's boundary with Washington County to the south. The North Fork Holston forms part of Sullivan's boundary with Hawkins County to the west. Fort Patrick Henry Dam and Boone Dam both create large artificial lakes along the South Fork Holston southeast of Kingsport.

Blountville, Sullivan's county seat, is Tennessee's only unincorporated county seat.

=== Morrell Cave ===
Morrell Cave (also known as Worleys Cave) is a Tennessee State Natural Area. The cave has a surveyed length of 4.4 miles (7.1 km), making it the second-longest cave in East Tennessee and the 177th longest cave in the United States. Morrell Cave is located on the south side of the Holston River, 2.5 miles (4.0 km) east of Bluff City.

During the Civil War, the cave was a major source of saltpeter, the main ingredient of gunpowder. Significant evidence of this mining activity remains in the cave, including evidence of large amounts of saltpeter-bearing dirt having been removed, pick marks in the dirt, and an elaborate system of trails used by the miners. Cave historian Marion O. Smith has determined that two companies of the Confederate Nitre and Mining Bureau, District No. 7, were active in Sullivan County.

=== Adjacent counties and independent city ===
- Scott County, Virginia (north)
- Washington County, Virginia (northeast)
- Bristol, Virginia (northeast)
- Johnson County (east)
- Carter County (southeast)
- Washington County (south)
- Hawkins County (west)

=== National protected areas ===
- Appalachian Trail (part)
- Cherokee National Forest (part)

=== State protected areas ===
- Morrell's Cave State Natural Area
- Rocky Mount State Historic Site
- Warriors' Path State Park

=== Other protected areas ===
- Bays Mountain Park (part)

=== Major highways ===
- I-26
- I-81
- US 11E
- US 11W
- US 19
- US 19E
- US 19W
- US 23
- US 421
- SR 1
- SR 34
- SR 36
- SR 44
- SR 75
- SR 93
- SR 126
- SR 346
- SR 347
- SR 357
- SR 358
- SR 390
- SR 394
- SR 435

== Demographics ==
Historical population
Census	Pop.	Note	%±
1790	4,447		—
1800	10,218		129.8%
1810	6,847		−33.0%
1820	7,015		2.5%
1830	10,073		43.6%
1840	10,736		6.6%
1850	11,742		9.4%
1860	13,552		15.4%
1870	13,136		−3.1%
1880	18,321		39.5%
1890	20,879		14.0%
1900	24,935		19.4%
1910	28,120		12.8%
1920	36,259		28.9%
1930	51,087		40.9%
1940	69,085		35.2%
1950	95,063		37.6%
1960	114,139		20.1%
1970	127,329		11.6%
1980	143,968		13.1%
1990	143,596		−0.3%
2000	153,048		6.6%
2010	156,823		2.5%
2020	158,163		0.9%
2025 (est.)	163,759	▲	3.5%
U.S. Decennial Census; 1790-1960 1900-1990; 1990-2000 2010-2019

=== Racial and ethnic composition ===
Sullivan County, Tennessee – Racial and ethnic composition Note: the US Census treats Hispanic/Latino as an ethnic category. This table excludes Latinos from the racial categories and assigns them to a separate category. Hispanics/Latinos may be of any race.
Race / Ethnicity (NH = Non-Hispanic)	Pop 1980	Pop 1990	Pop 2000	Pop 2010	Pop 2020	% 1980	% 1990	% 2000	% 2010	% 2020
White alone (NH)	140,306	139,678	147,036	148,033	143,354	97.46%	97.27%	96.07%	94.39%	90.64%
Black or African American alone (NH)	2,594	2,551	2,868	3,272	3,197	1.80%	1.78%	1.87%	2.09%	2.02%
Native American or Alaska Native alone (NH)	146	358	322	379	350	0.10%	0.25%	0.21%	0.24%	0.22%
Asian alone (NH)	244	479	644	881	1,270	0.17%	0.33%	0.42%	0.56%	0.80%
Native Hawaiian or Pacific Islander alone (NH)	x	x	19	28	36	x	x	0.01%	0.02%	0.02%
Other race alone (NH)	53	9	92	110	457	0.04%	0.01%	0.06%	0.07%	0.29%
Mixed race or Multiracial (NH)	x	x	977	1,799	5,951	x	x	0.64%	1.15%	3.76%
Hispanic or Latino (any race)	625	521	1,090	2,321	3,548	0.43%	0.36%	0.71%	1.48%	2.24%
Total	143,968	143,596	153,048	156,823	158,163	100.00%	100.00%	100.00%	100.00%	100.00%

=== 2020 census ===
As of the 2020 census, there were 158,163 people, 67,853 households, and 44,284 families residing in the county. The median age was 45.7 years. 19.1% of residents were under the age of 18 and 22.5% of residents were 65 years of age or older. For every 100 females there were 94.6 males, and for every 100 females age 18 and over there were 92.5 males age 18 and over.

The racial makeup of the county was 91.3% White, 2.1% Black or African American, 0.3% American Indian and Alaska Native, 0.8% Asian, <0.1% Native Hawaiian and Pacific Islander, 1.0% from some other race, and 4.6% from two or more races. Hispanic or Latino residents of any race comprised 2.2% of the population.

73.5% of residents lived in urban areas, while 26.5% lived in rural areas.

Of all households, 25.2% had children under the age of 18 living in them; 47.1% were married-couple households, 18.5% were households with a male householder and no spouse or partner present, and 28.1% were households with a female householder and no spouse or partner present. About 30.5% of all households were made up of individuals and 14.5% had someone living alone who was 65 years of age or older.

There were 75,476 housing units, of which 10.1% were vacant. Among occupied housing units, 71.7% were owner-occupied and 28.3% were renter-occupied. The homeowner vacancy rate was 1.9% and the rental vacancy rate was 9.5%.

=== 2010 census ===
As of the 2010 United States census, there were 156,823 people living in the county. 95.1% were White, 2.1% Black or African American, 0.6% Asian, 0.3% Native American, 0.6% of some other race and 1.3% of two or more races. 1.5% were Hispanic or Latino (of any race).

=== 2000 census ===
As of the census of 2000, there were 153,048 people, 63,556 households, and 44,806 families living in the county. The population density was 371 people per square mile (143 people/km^{2}). There were 69,052 housing units at an average density of 167 units per square mile (64/km^{2}). The racial makeup of the county was 96.55% White, 1.89% Black or African American, 0.22% Native American, 0.43% Asian, 0.01% Pacific Islander, 0.21% from other races, and 0.69% from two or more races. 0.71% of the population were Hispanic or Latino of any race.

There were 63,556 households, out of which 28.40% had children under the age of 18 living with them, 57.10% were married couples living together, 10.20% had a female householder with no husband present, and 29.50% were non-families according to the United States Census Bureau. Of 63,556 households, 1,915 are unmarried partner households: 1,702 heterosexual, 97 same-sex male, 116 same-sex female. 26.40% of all households were made up of individuals, and 11.10% had someone living alone who was 65 years of age or older. The average household size was 2.36 and the average family size was 2.84.

In the county, the population was spread out, with 21.80% under the age of 18, 7.30% from 18 to 24, 28.40% from 25 to 44, 26.50% from 45 to 64, and 15.90% who were 65 years of age or older. The median age was 40 years. For every 100 females, there were 93.30 males. For every 100 females age 18 and over, there were 90.20 males.

The median income for a household in the county was $33,529, and the median income for a family was $41,025. Males had a median income of $31,204 versus $21,653 for females. The per capita income for the county was $19,202. About 9.70% of families and 12.90% of the population were below the poverty line, including 17.10% of those under age 18 and 11.90% of those age 65 or over.

== Government ==
Sullivan County, like all of Tennessee outside Nashville and Memphis, is heavily Republican, but, unlike most of East Tennessee, has not voted consistently Republican since the Civil War. Being one of only six counties in East Tennessee and the only county in Northeast Tennessee to support the Confederacy, Sullivan County mostly voted Democratic between the end of the Civil War and the mid-20th century, the only county in the northern two-thirds of East Tennessee to do so. The last Democratic presidential candidate to carry Sullivan County was southerner Jimmy Carter in 1976.

Richard Venable is the county mayor. The county commission has 24 members. Before 2010, commissioners were elected on a nonpartisan basis, but Sullivan County's commission election became a partisan election in 2010 after the county Republican Party decided to conduct a primary election for commission seats. The county elections also cover Circuit Court Judges, Chancellor, Criminal Court Judge, District Attorney General, Public Defender, County Trustee, General Session Judge, Sheriff, Circuit Court Clerk, County Clerk, Register of Deeds, Commissioner of Highways, County Attorney, and School Board.

United States presidential election results for Sullivan County, Tennessee
Year	Republican		Democratic		Third party(ies)	
Year	No.	%	No.	%	No.	%
1880	1,207	34.77%	2,264	65.23%	0	0.00%
1884	1,298	36.98%	2,176	61.99%	36	1.03%
1888	1,513	39.36%	2,255	58.66%	76	1.98%
1892	1,304	33.26%	2,281	58.17%	336	8.57%
1896	1,914	42.70%	2,512	56.05%	56	1.25%
1900	1,739	41.25%	2,421	57.42%	56	1.33%
1904	1,506	41.06%	2,116	57.69%	46	1.25%
1908	1,836	43.09%	2,393	56.16%	32	0.75%
1912	538	12.72%	2,413	57.07%	1,277	30.20%
1916	1,776	40.51%	2,601	59.33%	7	0.16%
1920	3,593	45.37%	4,327	54.63%	0	0.00%
1924	2,247	39.95%	3,313	58.90%	65	1.16%
1928	4,149	56.33%	3,216	43.67%	0	0.00%
1932	2,999	35.52%	5,322	63.04%	121	1.43%
1936	3,492	35.65%	6,269	64.00%	34	0.35%
1940	4,153	36.36%	7,234	63.34%	34	0.30%
1944	5,223	45.24%	6,290	54.49%	31	0.27%
1948	6,984	46.19%	7,626	50.44%	510	3.37%
1952	15,596	56.58%	11,849	42.99%	118	0.43%
1956	18,903	56.42%	14,106	42.10%	497	1.48%
1960	22,354	59.46%	14,731	39.18%	513	1.36%
1964	17,703	47.59%	19,496	52.41%	0	0.00%
1968	20,251	50.60%	9,783	24.44%	9,991	24.96%
1972	27,593	71.64%	10,007	25.98%	917	2.38%
1976	22,087	47.23%	23,353	49.94%	1,322	2.83%
1980	25,963	51.44%	22,341	44.27%	2,166	4.29%
1984	36,516	67.83%	16,925	31.44%	394	0.73%
1988	32,996	64.73%	17,396	34.13%	585	1.15%
1992	28,801	50.55%	20,935	36.74%	7,244	12.71%
1996	29,296	54.42%	20,571	38.21%	3,970	7.37%
2000	33,482	60.08%	21,354	38.32%	891	1.60%
2004	42,555	67.94%	19,637	31.35%	447	0.71%
2008	44,808	70.02%	18,354	28.68%	835	1.30%
2012	43,562	72.74%	15,321	25.58%	1,004	1.68%
2016	46,979	75.43%	12,578	20.20%	2,721	4.37%
2020	55,860	75.12%	17,272	23.23%	1,225	1.65%
2024	58,154	76.98%	16,624	22.01%	763	1.01%

=== Current composition of the Sullivan County Commission ===
District	Member	Location
District 1	David Hayes (2022- )	Bristol, TN
District 2	David Akard	Bristol, TN
District 2	Cheryl Harvey (2022- )	Bristol, TN
District 2	Matt Slagle (2022- )	Bristol, TN
District 3	Andrew Cross	Bristol, TN
District 4	Michael Cole	Blountville, TN
District 4	Joyce Crosswhite	Blountville, TN
District 4	Tony Leonard	Bristol, TN
District 5	Hershel Glover	Bluff City, TN
District 5	Dwight Kings	Piney Flats, TN
District 6	Daniel Horne (2022- )	Kingsport, TN
District 6	Jessica Crowder Means (2022- )	Kingsport, TN
District 6	Zane Vanover (2022- )	Kingsport, TN
District 7	Sam Jones	Kingsport, TN
District 7	Travis Ward (2022 - )	Kingsport, TN
District 8	Darlene Calton	Kingsport, TN
District 8	Mark Ireson (2022- )	Kingsport, TN
District 9	Joe Carr (2022- )	Kingsport, TN
District 9	Joseph McMurray (2022- )	Kingsport, TN
District 10	Larry Crawford	Kingsport, TN
District 10	Gary Stidham	Kingsport, TN
District 11	John Gardner	Kingsport, TN
District 11	Hunter Locke	Kingsport, TN
District 11	Archie Pierce	Kingsport, TN

==== 2022 ====
The primary election took place on May 3, 2022, with the general election concurring with the State/Federal general election on August 4. The following incumbents did not run for re-election, Randy C. Morrell (District 1), Mark Hutton (District 2), and Judy Blalock (District 6). Angie Stanley retired from her seat in District 7 to unsuccessfully challenge incumbent mayor Richard Veneable in a primary. Both of the incumbents from District 9 (Downton Kingsport, Tennessee, retired, Collette George (who also serves on the Kingsport BMA [her son was running for county mayor]) and Doug Woods.

==== Incumbents who lost re-election ====
The following incumbents lost re-nomination: District 2 - Mark Vance (ran for county mayor, dropped out, lost renomination) District 6 - Todd Broughton (placed 4th in top 3 advance) District 6 - Terry Harkleroad (placed 6th in top 3 advance)

No incumbents lost re-election in the general election. Most races were uncontested (the republicans were the only ones on the ballot), except District 7 in which Lori Love (wife of perennial candidate Avril Love, and Democratic State Executive Committeewoman) garnered 15% of the vote, and District 9, Independent Candidate Randall Bowers garnered 15% if the vote.

==== Sheriff ====
Sullivan County Sheriff Jeff Cassidy first ran for the position in 2018 as an independent beating out controversial Republican Wayne Anderson. He ran for re-election in 2022 as a Republican. Alongside Circuit Court Judge District 2, Part I, John S. McLellan III, who was serving as a Democrat, by changing both of their political affiliations to Republican in this election, they have effectively ended

==== County Mayoral Election ====
The election for County Mayor was between incumbent Richard S. Veneable (Republican), Val Edwards George (Independent [Conservative]), and Bobby Weaver (Independent [Conservative])

2021 Mayoral Election
Party	Candidate	Votes	%
Republican	Richard Veneable (incumbent)	5,162	66.26
Nonpartisan	Val Edwards George	1,967	25.25
Nonpartisan	Bobby Weaver	661	8.49
Total votes		7,790	100

=== Law enforcement ===
The Sullivan County Sheriffs Office has a staff of 260 deputies, corrections officers, and support personnel. The department also staffs a 24-7 9-1-1 dispatch center that provides dispatching for the sheriff's office, Bluff City Police Department, Sullivan County Fire Departments, and Sullivan County EMS. The dispatch center receives approximately 100,000 calls each year.

As of 2022 the sheriff is Jeff Cassidy, who won election in 2018 after a very contentious race against previous sheriff Wayne Anderson. Anderson apologized after sending text messages to a corrections employee that threatened to fire anyone who voted for his opponent, Jeff Cassidy, and saying that department employees would urinate on Cassidy's grave.

A 2022 lawsuit claims that sheriff's deputies retaliated against a woman who had asked them to wear face masks due to the COVID-19 pandemic.

Since the organization was established, 10 members of the sheriff's office have died in the line of duty.

== Communities ==
=== Cities ===
- Bluff City
- Bristol
- Johnson City (mostly in Washington County and a small portion in Carter County)
- Kingsport (partly in Hawkins County)

=== Census-designated places ===
- Bloomingdale
- Blountville (county seat)
- Colonial Heights
- Orebank
- Spurgeon (partial)
- Sullivan Gardens
- Walnut Hill

=== Unincorporated communities ===
- Arcadia
- Boring
- Buffalo
- Cedar Grove (east)
- Cedar Grove (west)
- Fordtown
- Holston Valley
- Lynn Garden
- Morrison City
- Piney Flats

== Education ==
The three school districts are Bristol Tennessee City Schools, Kingsport City School District, and Sullivan County School District.

The Sullivan county school district includes:

Elementary schools

- Bluff City Elementary
- Central Heights Elementary
- Mary Hughes School
- Sullivan Gardens Elementary
- Emmett Elementary
- Holston Elementary
- Indian Springs Elementary
- Ketron Elementary
- Miller Perry Elementary
- Rock Springs Elementary

Middle schools

- Central Middle
- East Middle
- Sullivan Heights Middle

High schools

- Sullivan East High School
- West Ridge High School

== Notable people ==
- Besse Cooper, (1896-2012), age 116, the world's oldest living person from June 21, 2011, until her death on December 4, 2012.
- Austin Augustus King (1802–1870), American lawyer, politician, and military officer. Tenth governor of Missouri and a one-term United States congressman.
- John Smith, early leader in the Restoration Movement.

== See also ==
- National Register of Historic Places listings in Sullivan County, Tennessee
