= Cedar Grove, North Carolina =

Cedar Grove, North Carolina may refer to:

- Cedar Grove (Huntersville, North Carolina), a historic plantation house
- Cedar Grove, Orange County, North Carolina, an unincorporated community
- Cedar Grove, Randolph County, North Carolina, an unincorporated community

== See also ==
- Cedar Grove (disambiguation)
