= Cedar Grove, Tennessee =

Cedar Grove, Tennessee may refer to the following places in Tennessee:

- Cedar Grove, Bedford County, Tennessee, an unincorporated community
- Cedar Grove, Carroll County, Tennessee, an unincorporated community
- Cedar Grove, Henderson County, Tennessee, an unincorporated community
- Cedar Grove, Humphreys County, Tennessee, an unincorporated community
- Cedar Grove, Pickett County, Tennessee, an unincorporated community
- Cedar Grove, Roane County, Tennessee, an unincorporated community
- Cedar Grove, Rutherford County, Tennessee, an unincorporated community
- Cedar Grove (east), Sullivan County, Tennessee, an unincorporated community
- Cedar Grove (west), Sullivan County, Tennessee, an unincorporated community
- Cedar Grove, Van Buren County, Tennessee, an unincorporated community
- Cedar Grove, Wilson County, Tennessee, an unincorporated community
