= Tennessee State Route 75 =

State highway in Tennessee, United States

State Route 75
- SR 75 mainline in red

Route information
- Maintained by TDOT
- Length: 27.7 mi (44.6 km)
- Existed: October 1, 1923–present

Major junctions
- South end: US 11E / US 321 in Limestone
- I-26 / US 23 in Johnson City/Gray; SR 36 in Spurgeon; SR 357 to I-81 in Blountville
- North end: SR 126 in Blountville

Location
- Country: United States
- State: Tennessee
- Counties: Washington, Sullivan

Highway system
- Tennessee State Routes; Interstate; US; State
← I-75	→ US 76

State Route 75 (SR 75) is a state highway in Tennessee in the northeastern portion of the state. The highway begins at US 11E and US 321 in Limestone and ends at SR 126 in Blountville.

== Route description ==
=== Washington County ===
SR 75 begins as a 2-lane highway in Washington County in Limestone at an intersection with US 11E/US 321/SR 34. The highway then heads northeast through rural farmland to have an intersection with SR 81 just before passing through Sulphur Springs. SR 75 then continues to enter Gray, where it has an interchange with I-26/US 23 (Exit 13). The highway then widens to a 4-lane undivided highway and passes just southeast of downtown before leaving Gray and passing through Spurgeon, where it has an intersection with SR 36. SR 75 then crosses the South Fork Holston River into Sullivan County, just north of Boone Dam and Boone Lake.

=== Sullivan County ===
SR 75 continues northeast to pass through Boring before entering Blountville and passing by the Tri-Cities Regional Airport, where it has an interchange with SR 357. SR 75 then narrows to 2-lanes and passes rural areas of Blountville before entering downtown, where it comes to an intersection with SR 126.

The entire route of SR 75 is a secondary highway.

== History ==
The current SR 75 is the third state highway in Tennessee to bear this numbering. The first alignment was one of the original state highways established on October 1, 1923, and ran between Springfield to the Kentucky line along what is now US 31W. In 1925 or 1926, this route was truncated by part of SR 79, and completely renumbered as part of SR 49 and SR 52 in 1927 or 1928. Around the same time, the second SR 75 was established between the North Carolina line near the Sevier-Cocke County line and US 25/70 in Newport. This route was renumbered as part of SR 32 in 1939 or 1940. The present-day SR 75 was established between 1964 and 1969, as a renumbering of part of SR 37 between US 23 in Gray and SR 126 in Blountville. On July 1, 1983, SR 75 was extended south to US 11E/321 in Limestone on Gray Station Road as part of a statewide takeover and renumbering of roads that year. Signs were posted the following year.

In May 2000, the Gray Fossil Site was discovered by TDOT construction crews along SR 75 near Gray. This site consists of fossils from the early Pliocene epoch that are between 4.5 and 4.9 million years old. A museum on the site opened in 2007.

== Future ==
A widening project has been taking place on SR 75 to provide a four-lane highway from Interstate 26 in Gray to the Tri-Cities Regional Airport in Blountville. On November 1, 2013, TDOT opened all four lanes of traffic, but much work still needs to be done.

== Junction list ==
County	Location	mi	km	Destinations	Notes
Washington	Limestone	0.0	0.0	US 11E / US 321 (Andrew Johnson Highway/SR 34) – Greeneville, Jonesborough	Southern terminus
Washington				SR 81 – Fall Branch, Kingsport, Jonesborough, Erwin	
Washington	Johnson City			I-26 / US 23 – Kingsport, Johnson City	I-26 exit 13
Washington	Spurgeon			SR 36 – Colonial Heights, Kingsport, Johnson City	
Sullivan	Blountville			Airport Parkway – Tri-Cities Regional Airport	Interchange, no southbound SR 75 access to Airport via Interchange
Sullivan	Blountville			SR 357 north (Airport Parkway) to I-81 – Kingsport	Interchange
Sullivan	Blountville	27.7	44.6	SR 126 (Bristol Highway/Memorial Boulevard) – Blountville, Bristol, Kingsport	Northern terminus
1.000 mi = 1.609 km; 1.000 km = 0.621 mi: Incomplete access
