= Fordtown, Tennessee =

Fordtown
- Unincorporated community
- Location within Tennessee Location within the United States
- Coordinates: 36°27′10.4″N 82°30′12.5″W
- Country: United States
- State: Tennessee
- County: Sullivan
- Elevation: 1,467 ft (447 m)
- Time zone: UTC-5 (Eastern)
  - Summer (DST): UTC-4 (EDT)
- ZIP code: 37663
- Area code: 423
- GNIS feature ID: 1303455

Fordtown is an unincorporated community in Sullivan County, Tennessee, located south of Colonial Heights. This community's name was adopted due to the number of people with the Ford surname who lived in the area. Country singer Tennessee Ernie Ford (1919–1991) was born in Fordtown. The community is accessed by the road named after it, Fordtown Road.
