= Boring, Tennessee =

Unincorporated community in Tennessee, US

Coordinates: 36°27′25″N 082°25′10″W

Boring is an unincorporated community in Sullivan County, Tennessee. Boring is located off Tennessee State Route 75 in Southern Sullivan County, southeast of Kingsport.

== History ==
A post office called Boring was established in 1881, and remained in operation until it was discontinued in 1903. The community might be named for a member of the Boring family known to be residing there in the 1870s.
