= Colonial Heights =

Colonial Heights is the name of several places in the United States:

- Colonial Heights, Virginia
- Colonial Heights, Tennessee
- Colonial Heights, Lawrence, Massachusetts
- Colonial Heights Neighborhood, Yonkers, New York
