= Tennessee State Route 357 =

State highway in Tennessee, United States

State Route 357
- Airport Parkway
- SR 357 highlighted in red

Route information
- Maintained by TDOT
- Length: 2.55 mi (4.10 km)
- Existed: July 1, 1983–present
- History: Completed in 1975

Major junctions
- South end: SR 75 in Kingsport city limits
- North end: I-81 in Kingsport city limits

Location
- Country: United States
- State: Tennessee
- Counties: Sullivan

Highway system
- Tennessee State Routes; Interstate; US; State
← SR 356	→ SR 358

State Route 357 (SR 357) is a 2.55-mile-long (4.10 km), north–south state route in Sullivan County, Tennessee. A four-lane divided highway, the route serves as a connector road from the Tri-Cities Regional Airport to Interstate 81 (I-81) and is known as Airport Parkway. It was constructed in conjunction with I-81 and was completed in 1975. The state assumed maintenance of the road in 1983, designating it as SR 357. Two proposed extensions of the road received significant public opposition and were ultimately indefinitely deferred in favor of other road improvements.

== Route description ==
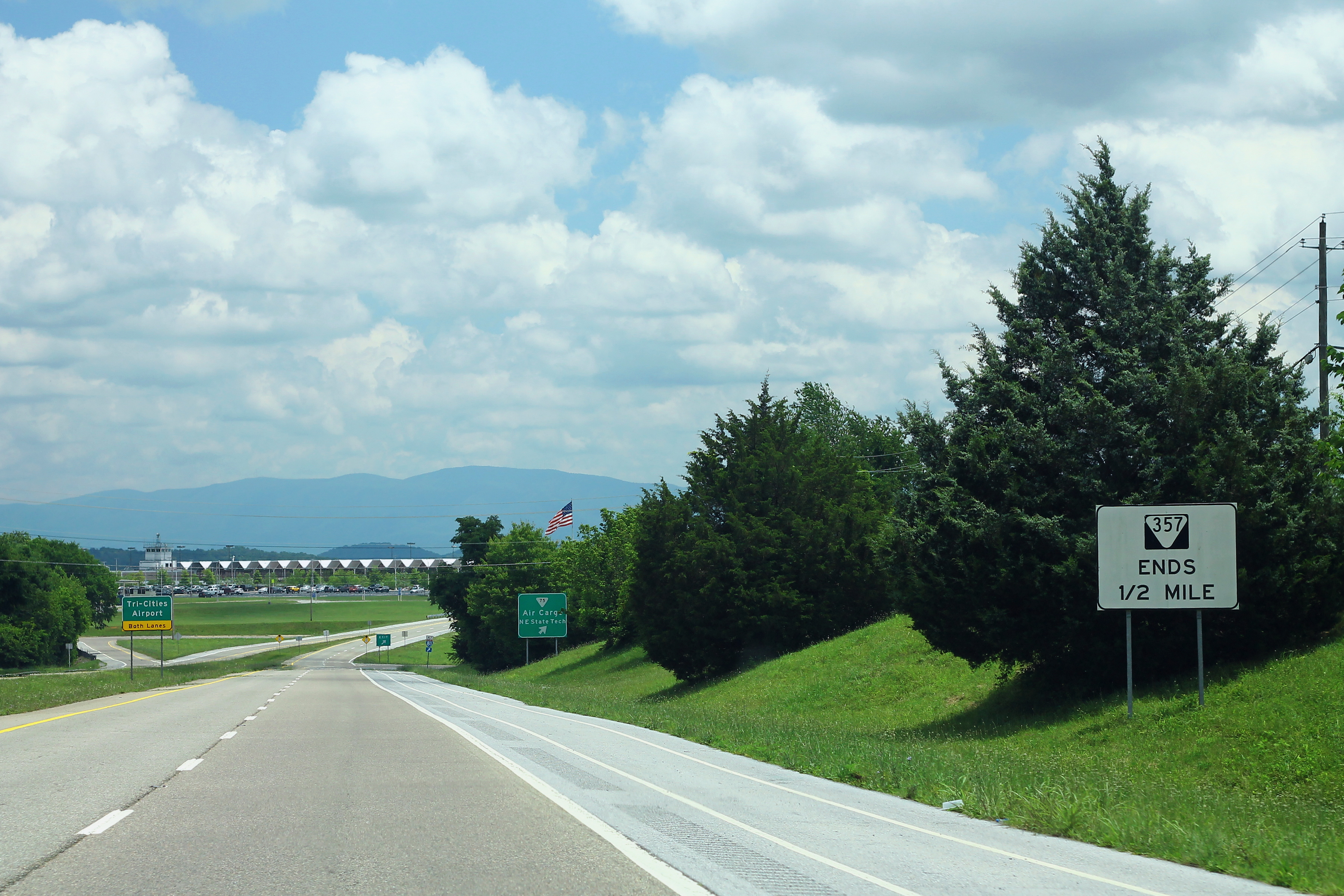
The southbound lanes near the southern terminus

SR 357 is a four-lane divided highway for its entire length of 2.55 miles (4.10 km) and is known as Airport Parkway. The route is technically located within the city limits of Kingsport, although it is about 10 miles (16 km) southeast of the main populated area of the city, and is about the same distance from the census-designated place of Blountville. The highway is classified as an intermodal connector in the National Highway System, a national network of roads identified as important to the national economy, defense, and mobility. The road is classified as a secondary highway by the Tennessee Department of Transportation (TDOT), despite being a major arterial.

SR 357 begins at a partial diamond interchange with SR 75 (Bristol Highway) adjacent to the Tri-Cities Regional Airport. East of the interchange, the unnumbered Airport Parkway continues as a two-lane road to the main airport terminal and parking area. The highway initially goes west for a short distance before passing through the Northeast Tennessee Business Park, where it has a four-way intersection with Harry Steadman Drive, and turns north-northwest. The route then crosses Centenary Road, which is accessible via an interchange-style connector road. Passing a rock quarry, the highway curves around a small ridge and crosses Shipley Ferry Road, which is also accessible via an interchange connector road. SR 357 then curves back around and reaches its northern terminus at I-81. North of this point, the road continues for 1/2 mile (0.80 km) to the north as Browder Road, a two-lane locally maintained road.

== History ==
=== Construction and early history ===
During the planning phase of the Interstate Highway System, the route that became I-81 was placed northwest of the airport. In 1957, the Johnson City Planning Commission unsuccessfully lobbied to move the routing a few miles south to run closer to the airport, as well as Johnson City. For this reason, a connector road between the airport and I-81 was planned. On February 14, 1967, a plan was presented to the Sullivan County Court to allow the state and county each to fund half of the project. Some local officials were reluctant to back the proposal at that time, since the project was still in the planning phase. Others felt that Sullivan County should not be responsible for the entire cost of local funding, since the airport is regional. After further analysis, the county court ultimately approved the funding plan on July 17, 1967.

The connector road, which was initially known as Tri-Cities Airport Road or the Tri-Cities Airport Connector, was constructed in conjunction with I-81. The contract for the route was awarded on May 4, 1971, and construction was underway three months later. The project was initially slated for completion in August 1973, but that month, the contractor ceased work on the project in order to focus on completing Interstate Highways in the state. This action was blamed on fuel shortages that were presumably part of the global energy crisis that year. However, the delay was also speculated to be due to an emphasis on completing Interstate Highways in East Tennessee, including I-81, which were also delayed by the energy crisis. Construction reportedly resumed a few months later, and by February 1974, the route was expected to be complete by the fall of that year. The project experienced additional delays, however. The road was opened to traffic on a limited basis by February 1975, and was completed four months later. The connecting section of I-81 was partially opened in December 1974 and fully opened in August 1975.

The connector road was constructed as a partnership between the state and county government, and then turned over to local control once construction was complete, with the exceptions of each termini. On July 1, 1983, the state assumed control of the route as part of a statewide takeover of approximately 3,300 miles (5,300 km) of city- and county-maintained roads, which also included a renumbering of a number of existing state routes. At this time, the road was designated SR 357. In 2003 and 2004, the overpass over SR 75 at the southern terminus of SR 357 was widened to include an additional turn lane as part of an expansion project at the airport.

=== Proposed extensions ===
SR 357 has been proposed to be extended. In 1994, the Sullivan County Commission and several cities requested that TDOT study the feasibility of extending the route beyond its southern terminus. TDOT explored a total of four routes for a southeastern extension that would begin approximately midway along the route's current alignment. These included an alignment north of the airport to SR 394 near the Bristol Motor Speedway, and two options running south of the airport to the intersection of US 11E and US 19E in Bluff City. A public hearing was first held on February 11, 1997, where several people expressed opposition. By September 1997, TDOT had settled on a nine-mile (14 km) alignment running north of the airport to connect to Bluff City that was a combination of the other alternatives. Preliminary planning was underway in 1999. By early 2001, two local advocacy groups were expressing opposition to the proposal, and a public hearing on April 17 of that year was met largely with negative feedback. Opponents cited the potential of the roadway to induce sprawl in a predominantly rural area and negative environmental impacts where the roadway would cross the Boone Lake reservoir on the South Fork Holston River, and also argued that the projected traffic volumes did not justify the extension. Many also believed that other road improvements were of a greater need. Supporters, including state senator Ron Ramsey and Sullivan County commissioners, argued the extension was necessary for economic development.

In response to the backlash, the Sullivan County Commission narrowly voted on April 23, 2001, to request that TDOT delay the extension so that they could conduct a study. Four months later, the commission hired a consultant to study the feasibility and impacts of the project. In 2003, the eastern extension was one of 15 controversial projects reviewed by the University of Tennessee Center for Transportation Research in response to public opposition to various TDOT projects. This study resulted in the formation of a 19-member team of citizens from Sullivan County to evaluate interests and concerns about the project in February 2004, after local officials reaffirmed their support for the project two months prior. On December 7, 2005, the Federal Highway Administration, in conjunction with TDOT, published a notice of intent to prepare an environmental impact statement for the project. After nearly two years of public engagement, TDOT announced on March 12, 2007, that it was suspending the project indefinitely and focusing on other projects in the area. During the public involvement period, TDOT found that there was a lack of perception of a need for the extension, and the local metropolitan planning organizations (MPOs) also did not consider it to be a priority. One week later, the Sullivan County Commission passed a resolution asking TDOT to rescind their decision.

SR 357 has also been proposed to be extended north of I-81 to US 11W in central Kingsport, which would also provide a connection to SR 126. In 1994, this proposal was included in a long-term road improvement plan developed by the city of Kingsport. In early 1997, Kingsport officials asked TDOT to begin studying four potential alignments, which had been developed in collaboration between the Kingsport MPO and TDOT. The purpose of this project was to provide a more direct route to the airport from Kingsport. Local advocacy groups also expressed opposition to this proposal in the early 2000s. The project resurfaced again in November 2020 when TDOT representatives presented a concept for extending the route to SR 126 to improve access to West Ridge High School, which opened the following year. The local governments ultimately chose to construct access roads to the school.

== Junction list ==
The entire route is in Sullivan County.

Location	mi	km	Destinations	Notes
Kingsport	0.00	0.00	SR 75 – Blountville, Bristol, Gray	Interchange; road continues straight to Tri-Cities Regional Airport
Kingsport	1.48	2.38	Centenary Road	Accessible via two-way access road
Kingsport	2.02	3.25	Shipley Ferry Road	Accessible via two-way access road
Kingsport	2.55	4.10	I-81 – Bristol, Kingsport, Knoxville	I-81 exit 63; northern terminus; road continues north as Browder Road
1.000 mi = 1.609 km; 1.000 km = 0.621 mi
