= DeVault =

DeVault is a family name. It may also refer to the following:

People and places

- Mike DeVault (born 1958), American politician
- Devault, Pennsylvania
- The DeVault Memorial Stadium
- The DeVault-Massengill House in Tennessee
