= Morrison City, Tennessee =

Unincorporated community in Tennessee, US

Coordinates: 36°35′29″N 82°34′25″W

Morrison City is an unincorporated community in Sullivan County, Tennessee, United States. Named for pioneer settler Peter Morison, Morrison City developed with the industrial growth of nearby Kingsport, Tennessee, in the 1930s. Peter Morison, his wife Mary Kirkpatrick Morison, and other relatives, are buried in the Morrison Chapel Cemetery, in the heart of the community. They were awarded a land grant by the state of North Carolina, which controlled the area prior to Tennessee Statehood, in 1780. This was to recognize distinguished service during the Battle of King's Mountain.

Lynn Garden Drive (Tennessee State Route 36) and U.S. Route 23 intersect where the community's business district once stood, running north and south. Carter's Valley road runs east and west through the community. Bell Ridge School stands to the south of West Carter's Valley Road, behind State Line Baptist Church. This school was the community's only educational enterprise, and was part of the Sullivan County School system until it closed and was purchased by a private school.

Tenneva Street and Echo Drive were the main north–south streets before Lynn Garden Drive. Two churches, several businesses, and many homes were removed or relocated when the new US 23 was built through the area in the 1980s. Basset's Dairy Bar, W. D. Sensabaugh's Store, Lee's Barber Shop, a Monument Company, and several fruitstands once operated there. Parker's Grill was a restaurant that later was occupied by a taxidermy shop.

Citizens just north of the Virginia state line were categorized by utility companies for several years in a grouping called "Morrison City, Virginia." They maintained Virginia residency, but were served by Tennessee telephone and mail service. The Virginia side had several businesses attracted to the area because of the proximity to the state line, and capitalizing on cheaper goods not available in Tennessee due to differences in state and county laws. These included cigarette sales businesses, liquor trafficking stores, fireworks stands, and a club where alcohol was served to customers.

An unnamed tributary of the North Fork of the Holston River begins in the Tennessee side of the Morrison City community and runs through the state line, alongside of the state highway, and empties into the river in Virginia. A natural gap in ridge dividing the two states provides easy access for the roadways.
