= Bill Streever =

Biologist and author

- Born: 1961 (age 64–65); Kingsport, Tennessee
- Website: http://billstreever.com/

Bill Streever (born 1961) is a biologist and writer known for bringing scientific topics to a popular audience.

== Books ==
Books written by Streever are as follows;

- In oceans deep: courage, innovation, and adventure beneath the waves (2019).
- And soon I heard a roaring wind: a natural history of moving air (2016)
- Heat: adventures in the world's fiery places (2013)
- Cold: Adventures in the World's Frozen Places Little, Brown, and Company (2009).
