= Orebank, Tennessee =

- Census-designated place
- Location within Tennessee Location within the United States
- Coordinates: 36°33′24″N 82°27′53″W
- Country: United States
- State: Tennessee
- County: Sullivan

Area
  - Total: 0.88 sq mi (2.28 km^{2})
  - Land: 0.88 sq mi (2.28 km^{2})
  - Water: 0 sq mi (0.00 km^{2})
- Elevation: 1,440 ft (440 m)

Population (2020)
  - Total: 929
  - Density: 1,054.7/sq mi (407.23/km^{2})
- Time zone: UTC-5 (Eastern (EST))
  - Summer (DST): UTC-4 (EDT)
- ZIP Code: 37664 (Kingsport)
- Area codes: 423 and 729
- FIPS code: 47-55980
- GNIS feature ID: 2804640

Orebank is an unincorporated community and census-designated place (CDP) in Sullivan County, Tennessee. It was first listed as a CDP prior to the 2020 census.

It is in the northwest part of the county, bordered to the north, west, and south by the city of Kingsport. It sits on a topographic bench between Chestnut Ridge to the south and the valley of Reedy Creek to the north. Reedy Creek is a west-flowing tributary of the South Fork of the Holston River, part of the Tennessee River watershed. Orebank Road is the main street through the community, leading west into Kingsport. Downtown Kingsport is 6 miles (10 km) west of Orebank.

== Demographics ==
Historical population
Census	Pop.	Note	%±
2020	929		—
U.S. Decennial Census
