= Jeff Chapman-Crane =

American painter

- Born: 1953 (age 72–73); Kingsport, Tennessee
- Occupations: Painter and sculptor
- Writing career
- Genres: gouache, egg tempera, watercolor

Jeff Chapman-Crane (born 1953) is an Appalachian artist and American realist.

== Biographical background ==
Chapman was born in 1953 in Kingsport, Tennessee. His only formal training was four years of high school art classes under his teacher- and later, mentor- Don Hilton. He credits Hilton as having a significant influence on his artistic growth. Chapman-Crane began his career in the arts in 1974.

== Body of work ==
=== Book covers ===
Chapman-Crane's work has appeared on various literary covers and pages within publications. His art wrapped the words of Ann Pancake's novel, "As Strange as This Weather Has Been," Artie Ann Bates' children's book, "Ragsale," Jenny Galloway Collins' book, "Ember Days," and a book of poems by Cranston Stroup called "Give God a Flower." "Ragsale" won the New England Bookfair's award for "Best in Show," and Louisville, Kentucky's Bernheim Arboretum Purchase Award. In addition to books, Chapman-Crane's art work appeared on the cover of the 17th edition of the journal, "Pine Mountain Sand and Gravel," and the program for the 16th Annual Festival of Faith in Louisville, Kentucky. His art also appeared in the October 1986 edition of American Artist Magazine, along with his instructions for painting with casein.

== Art as activism ==
=== Broad form deed ===
Chapman-Crane's art has been used in two activist campaigns. During a push to end the broad form deed, the grassroots organization, Kentuckians for the Commonwealth, utilized a print by Chapman-Crane in their advertisements. The image showed a silhouette of a bulldozer headed towards a simple house with the caption, "Save The Homeplace. Stop abuses of broad form deeds." That campaign ended in 1988 when the practice was outlawed.

=== The Agony of Gaia ===
More recently, Chapman-Crane's mixed media sculpture, The Agony of Gaia, has been used to promote awareness about Mountain Top Removal Mining in the Appalachians. It was unveiled in 2004 at a meeting of Kentuckians for the Commonwealth. The sculpture had been at more than 50 venues as of December 2011. It has been used to attract attention to the issue in the form of book covers, a billboard, and through making appearances at campuses, churches, and activist events. It also had a presence at a United Nations hearing.

The Agony of Gaia made its first cover appearance on Ann Pancake's novel, "Strange as this Weather Has Been". The cover image of the sculpture was snapped by photographer, James Archambeault. More recently, Gaia's image wrapped the frame of the journal, Pine Mountain Sand and Gravel.
