= Buffalo, Sullivan County, Tennessee =

Buffalo, Tennessee
- Unincorporated community
- Location within Tennessee Location within the United States
- Coordinates: 36°29′32″N 82°18′20″W
- Country: United States
- State: Tennessee
- County: Sullivan
- Elevation: 1,398 ft (426 m)
- Time zone: UTC-5 (Eastern (EST))
  - Summer (DST): UTC-4 (EDT)
- Area code: 423
- GNIS feature ID: 1314765

Buffalo is an unincorporated community in Sullivan County, Tennessee, United States.
