= Pal's =

American fast food restaurant chain

Pal’s Sudden Service

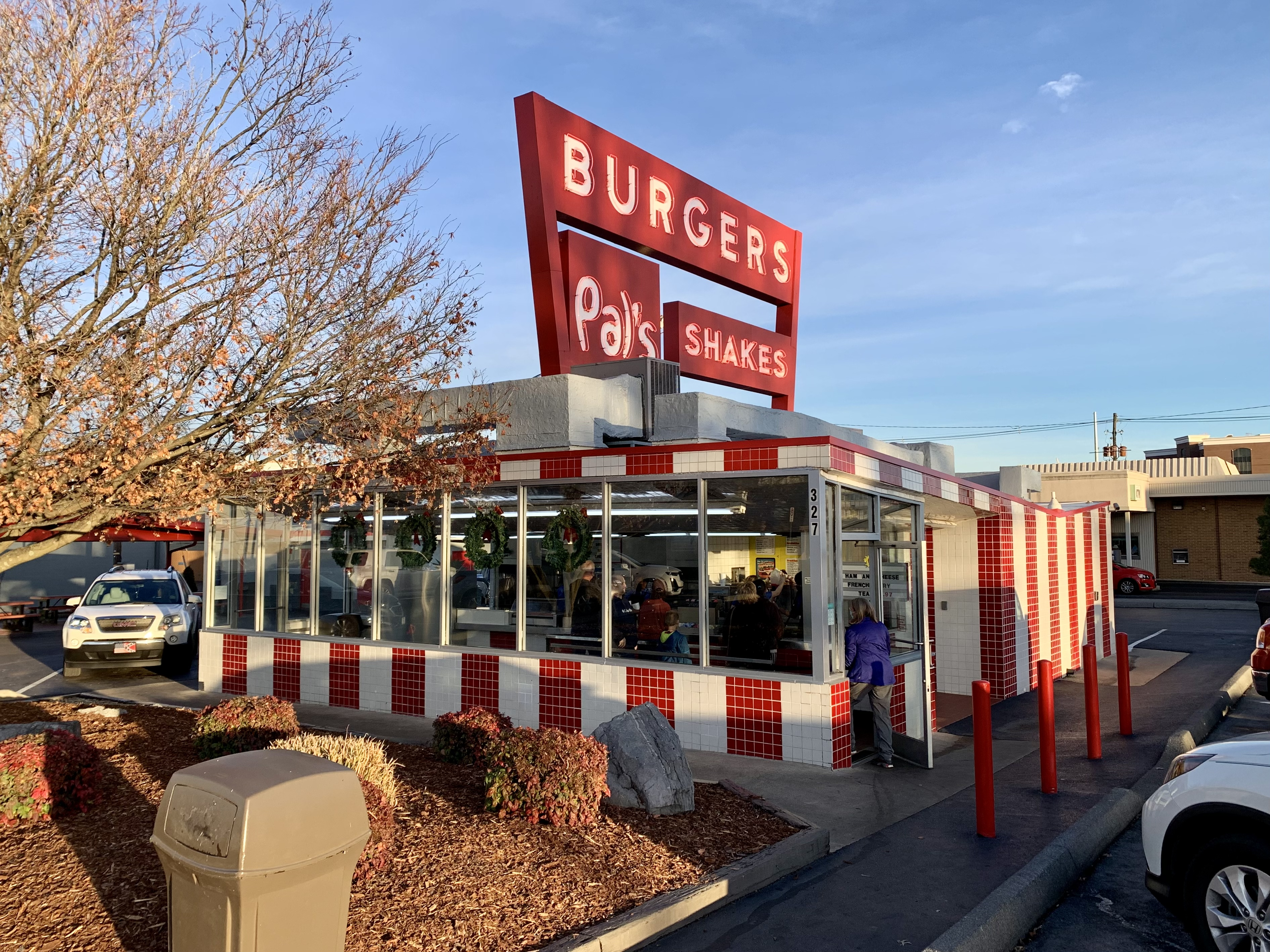
- The first Pal’s location, in downtown Kingsport, Tennessee
- Type: Private
- Industry: Fast food
- Founded: 1956
- Founder: Pal Barger
- Headquarters: Kingsport, Tennessee, U.S.
- Number of locations: 31 (as of April 2023)
- Area served: East Tennessee, Southwest Virginia
- Products: Hamburgers; Hot dogs; French fries; Soft drinks; Milkshakes; Sweet tea; Breakfast
- Number of employees: 1100 (2024)
- Website: eatpals.com

Pal's Sudden Service, normally called Pal's for short, is a regional fast food restaurant chain located in northeast Tennessee and southwestern Virginia, with stores concentrated in the Tri-Cities, Tennessee metro region. The first Pal's opened in 1956 in Kingsport, Tennessee a year after the founder of Pal's, Fred "Pal" Barger, attended a National Restaurant Convention in Chicago and met Ray Kroc and Fred Turner, observing the construction and equipment they used for the first McDonald's restaurant. Pal's longtime CEO is Thom Crosby who joined the company in 1981. In 2023, the company had 31 locations.

In 2001, Pal's won the Malcolm Baldrige National Quality Award, becoming the first restaurant company to receive the award.

== Organizational culture ==
The organization is often studied by competition and used as a case study for industrial/organizational psychologists. This is per the company's unique organizational culture, with training that includes pop quizzes, flashcards, and over 200 hours of training for employees, which results in significantly low turnover for the industry.

== Aesthetics ==
Pal's drive-thrus are recognized by their novelty architecture in the form of large replicas of food items placed on the roof. Added in 1985, these were designed by California artists Karen and Tony Barone. In addition to the novelty architecture, the buildings are typically painted a bright, cyan blue color, which adds to the visual distinction.

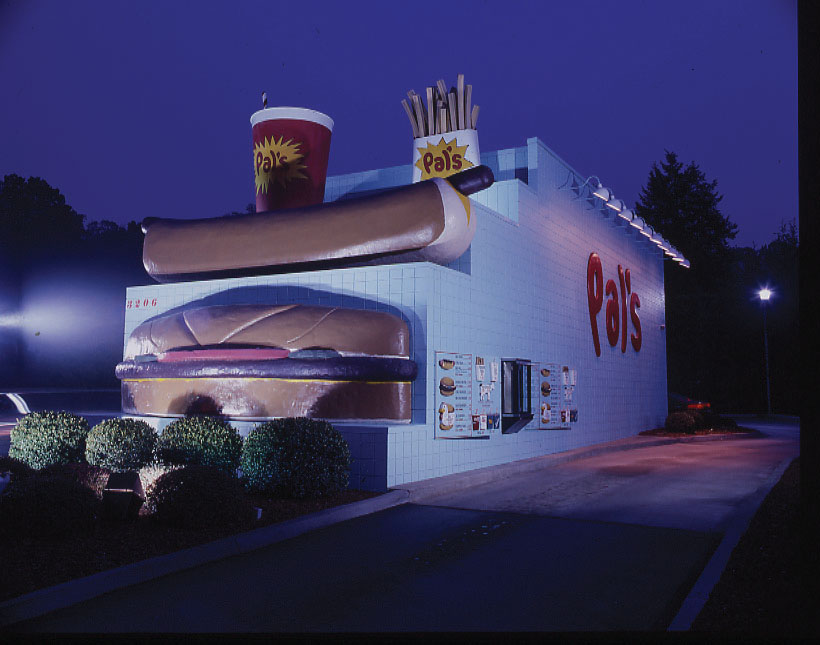
A typical Pal's Sudden Service location.

== Company history ==
- 1956 - First Pal's opened Kingsport #01
- 1958 - Lynn Garden Drive Pal's #02
- Pal’s opened in Elizabethton in the late 60’s, staying open until the mid 70’s
- 1967 - Circle Burger (closed) - Brook's Circle (a different building & location than current Pal's #12).
- 1985 - First box/tier design drive thrus open in Kingsport. Pal's #03 in Colonial Heights and #04 on Stone Drive.
- 1987 Pal's invents the “Big Tea.”
- 1990 - Pal's #05 opened in Johnson City near ETSU
- 1991 - Greeneville #06 and Gate City #07
- 1992 - Pal's Johnson City Mall #08 and Elizabethton #09
- 1993 - Pal's #10 Volunteer Parkway
- 1994 - Pal's #11 Bristol Highway
- 1995 - Pal's Brook's Circle #12 and Rogersville #13
- 1997 - Pal's Morristown #14 Pals Celebrates the 10th year of the “Big Tea”
- 1998 - Pal's #15 in Church Hill and Big Breakfast Introduced
- 1999 - Pal's opens in Bristol at Exit 7 #16
- 2001 - Pal's Wins Baldrige National Quality Award
- 2002 - President Bush presents Pal's CEO Thom Crosby and founder Pal Barger the Baldrige Award
- 2003 - Two new Pal's, Gray #18 and Blountville #19.
- 2006 - Pal's opens in Jonesborough Pal's #20.
- 2007 - Pal's celebrates the 20th year of the "Big Tea"
- 2008 - Pal's opens in Lebanon, Virginia #21
- 2009 - Pal's opens in Greeneville #22
- 2009 - Pal's introduces Razzie Tea
- 2009 - Neon sign at Pal's #2 taken down and replaced with "Big Man"
- 2010 - Pal's opens in Norton, Virginia. #23 It has the biggest opening in Pal's history to that time.
- 2012 - Pal's introduces new 3D website Pal's Sudden Service Pal's #24 Boone's Creek opened.
- 2013 - Pal's opened Pal's #25 Jefferson City and Pal's #26 Erwin, Tennessee locations.
- 2015 - Pal's opened Pal's #27 Bristol, Tennessee & Pal's #28 Morristown East
- 2016 - Pal's opened Pal's #29 Sunset Drive, Johnson City
- 2020 - Pal's opened store #30 in Abingdon, Area celebrates the 90th birthday of founder Pal Barger, Founder Pal Barger died on 10/29
- 2023 - Pal's opened Pal's #31 in Kingsport, TN
