= DeVault-Massengill House =

Historic house in Tennessee, United States

- U.S. National Register of Historic Places
- Location within Tennessee Location within the United States
- Nearest city: Piney Flats, Tennessee
- Coordinates: 36°24.342′N 82°20.677′W
- Built: 1769, 1842
- Architectural style: Log house, Greek Revival
- NRHP reference No.: 85000669
- Added to NRHP: 1985

The DeVault-Massengill House (also known as Mary Lou Farms) is a historical building and farmstead in Piney Flats, Tennessee, United States. The house is a mansion built in the Greek Revival style by Isaac DeVault in 1842. The first building on the property, a log cabin built by Henry Massengill around 1769, is also still intact. The house and property was listed in the U.S. National Register of Historic Places as the DeVault-Masengill house in 1985 for its architectural significance.

== History of the buildings and land ==
The property was first developed by Henry Massengill, who settled in eastern Tennessee in 1769. He built a log cabin on the property, which has been restored and is still there. He also developed it into a plantation, which remained in operation for many generations. The DeVault family acquired the property in the 19th century, and the Massengills bought it back in 1937. Today it lies along the Bristol Highway, across from the Rocky Mount Museum.
