= Cedar Grove (west), Sullivan County, Tennessee =

Cedar Grove, Tennessee
- Unincorporated community
- Location within Tennessee Location within the United States
- Coordinates: 36°34′24″N 82°31′29″W
- Country: United States
- State: Tennessee
- County: Sullivan
- Elevation: 1,381 ft (421 m)
- Time zone: UTC-5 (Eastern (EST))
  - Summer (DST): UTC-4 (EDT)
- Area code: 423
- GNIS feature ID: 1280031

Cedar Grove is an unincorporated community in Sullivan County, Tennessee, United States. Cedar Grove is located near the northern border of Kingsport, west of Tennessee State Route 93.
