= Piney Flats, Tennessee =

Unincorporated community in United States

Piney Flats is an unincorporated community in Sullivan County in the U.S. state of Tennessee. It is part of the Metropolitan Statistical Area, which is a component of the Johnson City-Kingsport-Bristol, TN-VA Combined Statistical Area – commonly known as the "Tri-Cities" region. Some areas of Piney Flats along U.S. Route 11E have been annexed by Johnson City (south of the Allison Road and Piney Flats Road intersection) and Bluff City north of the intersection and areas along Allison Road & Piney Flats Road. The ZIP Code for Piney Flats is 37686.

== Geography ==
Piney Flats is located at 36°25′10″N 82°18′14″W.

== See also ==
- Rocky Mount State Historic Site
