= Cedar Grove (east), Sullivan County, Tennessee =

Cedar Grove, Tennessee
- Unincorporated community
- Location within Tennessee Location within the United States
- Coordinates: 36°28′48″N 82°11′18″W
- Country: United States
- State: Tennessee
- County: Sullivan
- Elevation: 1,460 ft (450 m)
- Time zone: UTC-5 (Eastern (EST))
  - Summer (DST): UTC-4 (EDT)
- Area code: 423
- GNIS feature ID: 1327861

Cedar Grove is an unincorporated community in Sullivan County, Tennessee, United States. Cedar Grove is located along Tennessee State Route 44 7.9 miles (12.7 km) south of Bristol.
