= Cedar Grove (La Plata, Maryland) =

Historic house in Maryland, United States

- U.S. National Register of Historic Places
- Location within Maryland Location within the United States
- Nearest city: La Plata, Maryland
- Coordinates: 38°28′50″N 77°4′22″W
- Built: 1854
- Architectural style: Federal
- NRHP reference No.: 79001124
- Added to NRHP: March 2, 1979

Cedar Grove is a historic home located near La Plata, Charles County, Maryland, United States. It is a three-part house in the late Federal style, and built about 1854 by Francis Boucher Franklin Burgess. The house consists of a 2 1/2-story main block with a two-part east wing, all of common bond brick construction. There are several outbuildings, including two large barns, a small cattle barn, and several sheds.

Cedar Grove was listed on the National Register of Historic Places in 1979.
