= Cedar Grove Cemetery =

Cedar Grove Cemetery may refer to:

- Cedar Grove Cemetery (Franklin, Somerset County, New Jersey)
- Cedar Grove Cemetery (Chaumont, New York)
- Cedar Grove Cemetery (Queens), New York
- Cedar Grove Cemetery (New London, Connecticut)
- Cedar Grove Cemetery (New Bern, North Carolina)
- Cedar Grove Cemetery (Lebanon, Tennessee)
- Cedar Grove Cemetery (Portsmouth, Virginia)
- Cedar Grove Cemetery (University of Notre Dame), Indiana
