= Cedar Grove (Natchez, Mississippi) =

Historic house in Mississippi, United States

- U.S. National Register of Historic Places
- Location within Mississippi Location within the United States
- Location: SE of Natchez
- Coordinates: 31.42873°N 91.29562°W
- Area: 22.4 acres (9.1 ha)
- Architectural style: Greek Revival
- NRHP reference No.: 82003088
- Added to NRHP: March 19, 1982

Cedar Grove is a former plantation in Natchez, Adams County, Mississippi.

== Location ==
It is located in South East Natchez.

== History ==
The mansion was built in the 1850s for Absalom Sharp (1824-1851), a prominent cotton merchant from New Jersey. Additionally, he owned up to 900 acres of cotton fields and farmland. Whereas upstairs there used to be a ballroom, it was reconverted into bedrooms as well as a dining-room and a study in the 1870s.

It has been listed on the National Register of Historic Places since March 19, 1982. It now serves as a bed & breakfast.
