= Cedar Grove, Rutherford County, Tennessee =

Cedar Grove, Tennessee
- Unincorporated community
- Location within Tennessee Location within the United States
- Coordinates: 35°46′52″N 86°37′10″W
- Country: United States
- State: Tennessee
- County: Rutherford
- Elevation: 768 ft (234 m)
- Time zone: UTC-6 (Central (CST))
  - Summer (DST): UTC-5 (CDT)
- Area code: 615
- GNIS feature ID: 1280028

Cedar Grove is an unincorporated community in Rutherford County, Tennessee, United States. Cedar Grove is located in southwest Rutherford County 3.2 miles (5.1 km) north-northeast of Eagleville.
