= Cedar Grove, Bedford County, Tennessee =

Cedar Grove, Tennessee
- Unincorporated community
- Location within Tennessee Location within the United States
- Coordinates: 35°38′39″N 86°37′34″W
- Country: United States
- State: Tennessee
- County: Bedford
- Elevation: 718 ft (219 m)
- Time zone: UTC-6 (Central (CST))
  - Summer (DST): UTC-5 (CDT)
- Area code: 931
- GNIS feature ID: 1314807

Cedar Grove is an unincorporated community in Bedford County, Tennessee, United States. Cedar Grove is 4 miles (6.4 km) east-northeast of Chapel Hill.
