= Cedar Grove, Bullitt County, Kentucky =

Unincorporated community in Kentucky, United States

Cedar Grove
- Unincorporated community
- Location within the state of Kentucky Cedar Grove (the United States)
- Coordinates: 37°58′20″N 85°37′52″W
- Country: United States
- State: Kentucky
- County: Bullitt
- Elevation: 541 ft (165 m)
- Time zone: UTC-5 (Eastern (EST))
  - Summer (DST): UTC-4 (CST)
- ZIP codes: 40165
- GNIS feature ID: 507674

Cedar Grove is an unincorporated community located in Bullitt County, Kentucky, United States.
