= Rocky Mount State Historic Site =

- Rocky Mount
- U.S. National Register of Historic Places
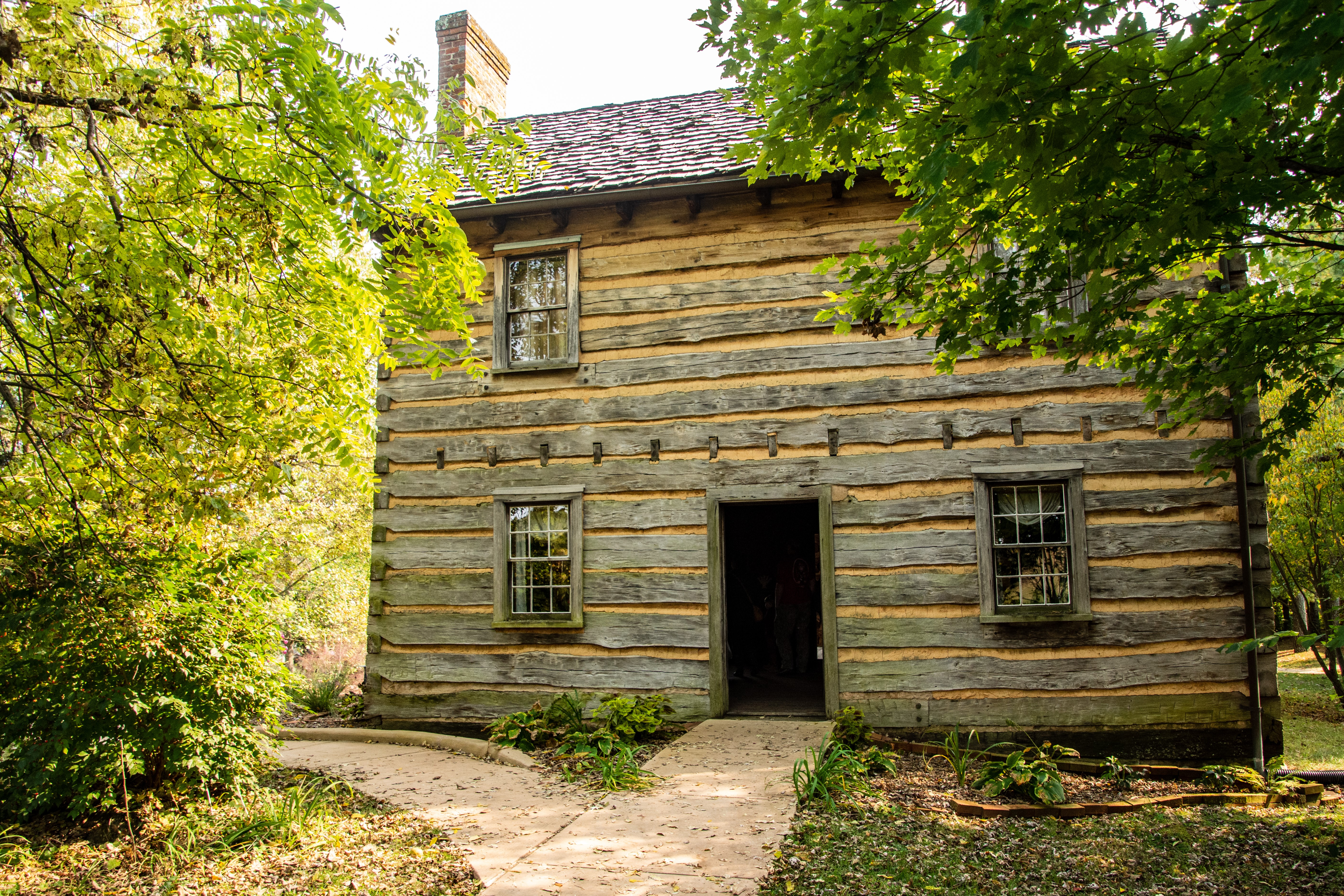
- The Cobb-Massengill House

- Location within Tennessee Location within the United States
- Nearest city: Piney Flats, Tennessee
- Coordinates: 36°24′21″N 82°20′12″W
- Area: 10 acres (4.0 ha)
- Built: 1828
- Architectural style: Log house
- NRHP reference No.: 70000617
- Added to NRHP: February 26, 1970

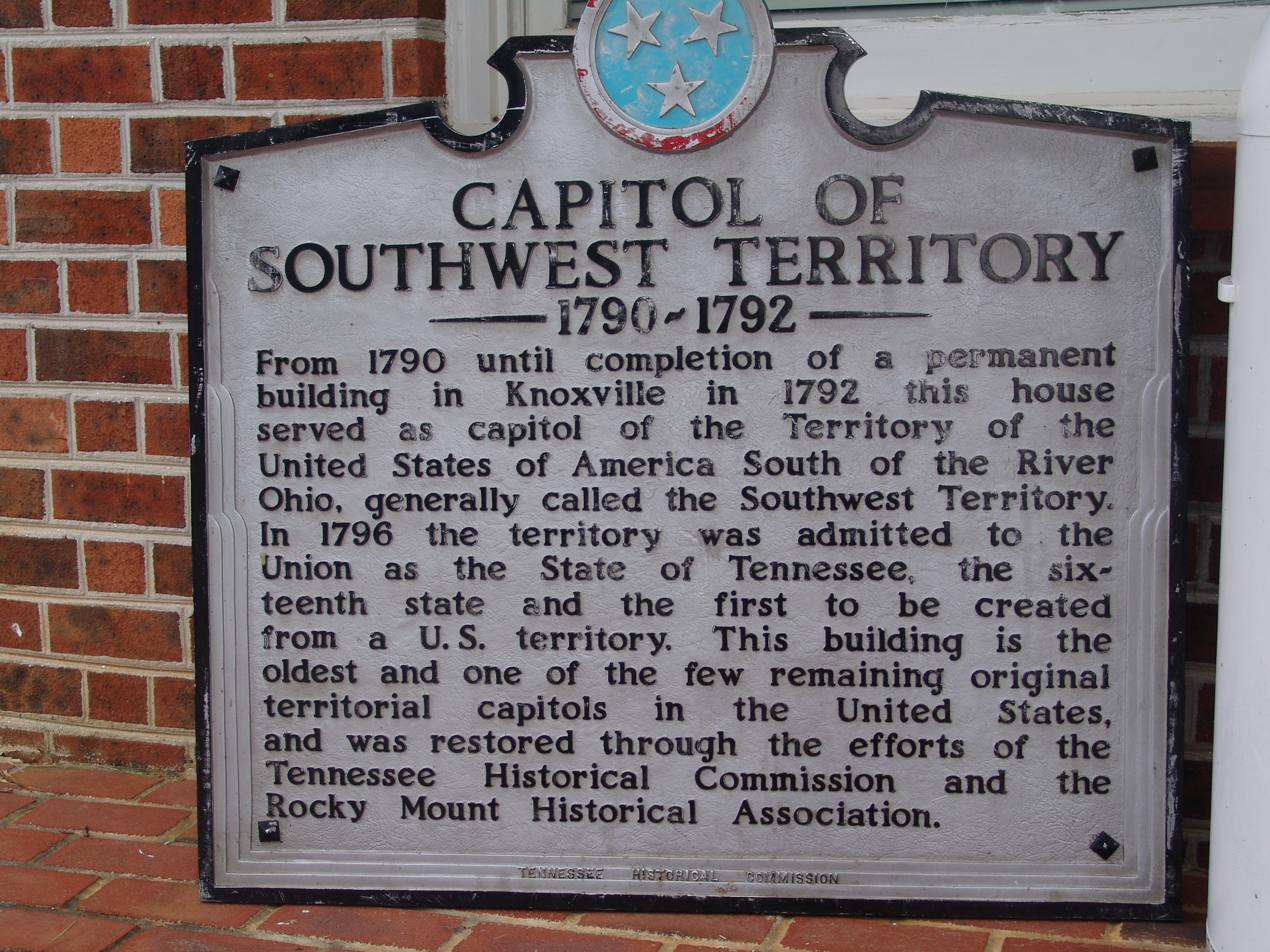
Informational sign

Rocky Mount, in Piney Flats, Tennessee, also known as the Cobb-Massengill House, was the first territorial capital of the Southwest Territory.

The property of William Cobb, the original residence at Rocky Mount served as the territorial capital from 1790 to 1792. Dendroarchaeological investigations at the site by the University of Tennessee revealed that the present dwelling dates to the late 1820s.

The property is owned by the State of Tennessee and has been operated by the Rocky Mount Historical Association, a non-profit organization in partnership with the Tennessee Historical Commission, since 1962. The property is a living museum that recreates the year 1791, when American Founding Father William Blount was in residence as governor. It is next to the DeVault-Massengill House.
