= Cedar Grove (Baltimore, Maryland) =

Historic house in Maryland, United States

- U.S. National Register of Historic Places
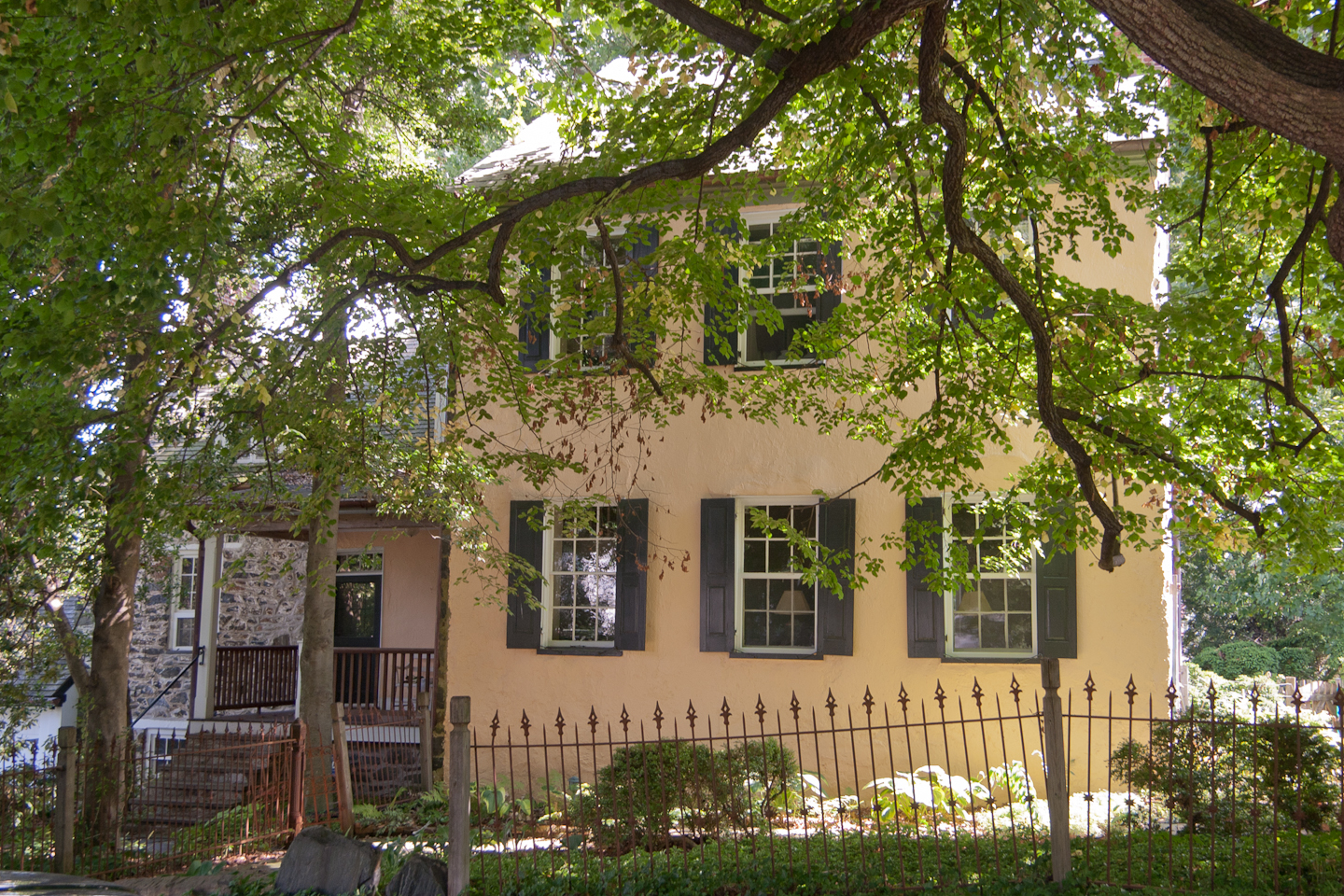
- Cedar Grove, August 2011

- Location within Baltimore Location within Maryland Location within the United States
- Location: 301 Kendall Rd., Baltimore, Maryland
- Coordinates: 39°20′43″N 76°37′46″W
- Area: 0.5 acres (0.20 ha)
- Built: 1799
- Architectural style: Greek Revival, Federal
- NRHP reference No.: 96001349
- Added to NRHP: November 15, 1996

Cedar Grove, also known as Ridgely's Whim or Sunday's Chance, is a historic home located at Baltimore, Maryland, United States. It is a large 2 1/2-story, side-passage, double-pile plan house constructed about 1841. A 1 1/2-story wing incorporates an earlier structure, built between 1799 and 1813.

Cedar Grove was listed on the National Register of Historic Places in 1996.
