= Cedar Grove (Brownsville, Tennessee) =

- Formerly listed on the U.S. National Register of Historic Places
- Location within Tennessee Location within the United States
- Nearest city: Brownsville, Tennessee
- Coordinates: 35°40′19″N 89°23′38″W
- Area: 4.3 acres (1.7 ha)
- Built: 1850
- Architectural style: Greek Revival
- NRHP reference No.: 80003833

Significant dates
- Added to NRHP: April 29, 1980
- Removed from NRHP: July 25, 2018

Cedar Grove, near Brownsville, Tennessee, also known as Holloway-Morey House, is a one-and-a-half-story cottage which was built in c.1850. It was listed on the National Register of Historic Places in 1980, and was delisted in 2018.

It has Greek Revival architecture, specifically its one-story pedimented portico with four square Tuscan columns, and its door with head and side lights (windows).

Yellow poplar wood was used in its mortise-and-tenon frame construction, in its weatherboard siding, and in its wide plank floors.

At its NRHP listing in 1980 it was on a 4.3 acres (1.7 ha) property; it was once the center of a 1,000 acres (4.0 km^{2}) plantation.
