= Lynn Garden, Tennessee =

Community in Tennessee, US

Coordinates: 36°34′37″N 82°34′04″W

Lynn Garden is a community and neighborhood in Kingsport, Tennessee.

Lynn Garden's boundaries are that of Kingsport's zip code 37665.

== Postal service ==
Lynn Garden does not currently have a post office, but once did. The community has its own zip code (37665).
