= Cedar Grove, Mercer County, New Jersey =

Populated place in Mercer County, New Jersey, US

Cedar Grove, New Jersey
- Unincorporated community
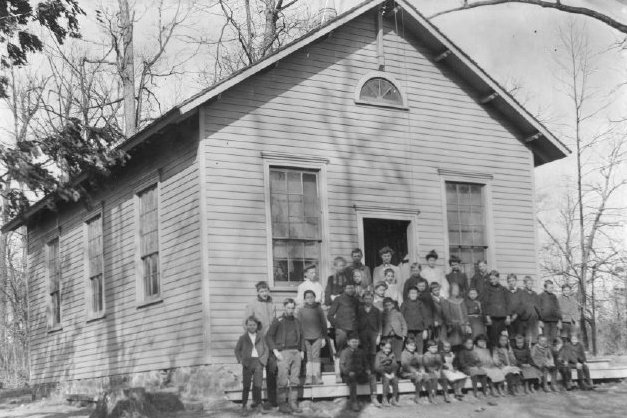
- A 1904 class photo of the Cedar Grove School

- Location within Mercer County, New Jersey Location within New Jersey Location within the United States
- Coordinates: 40°22′05″N 74°41′42″W
- Country: United States
- State: New Jersey
- County: Mercer
- Borough: Princeton
- Elevation: 207 ft (63 m)
- GNIS feature ID: 875276

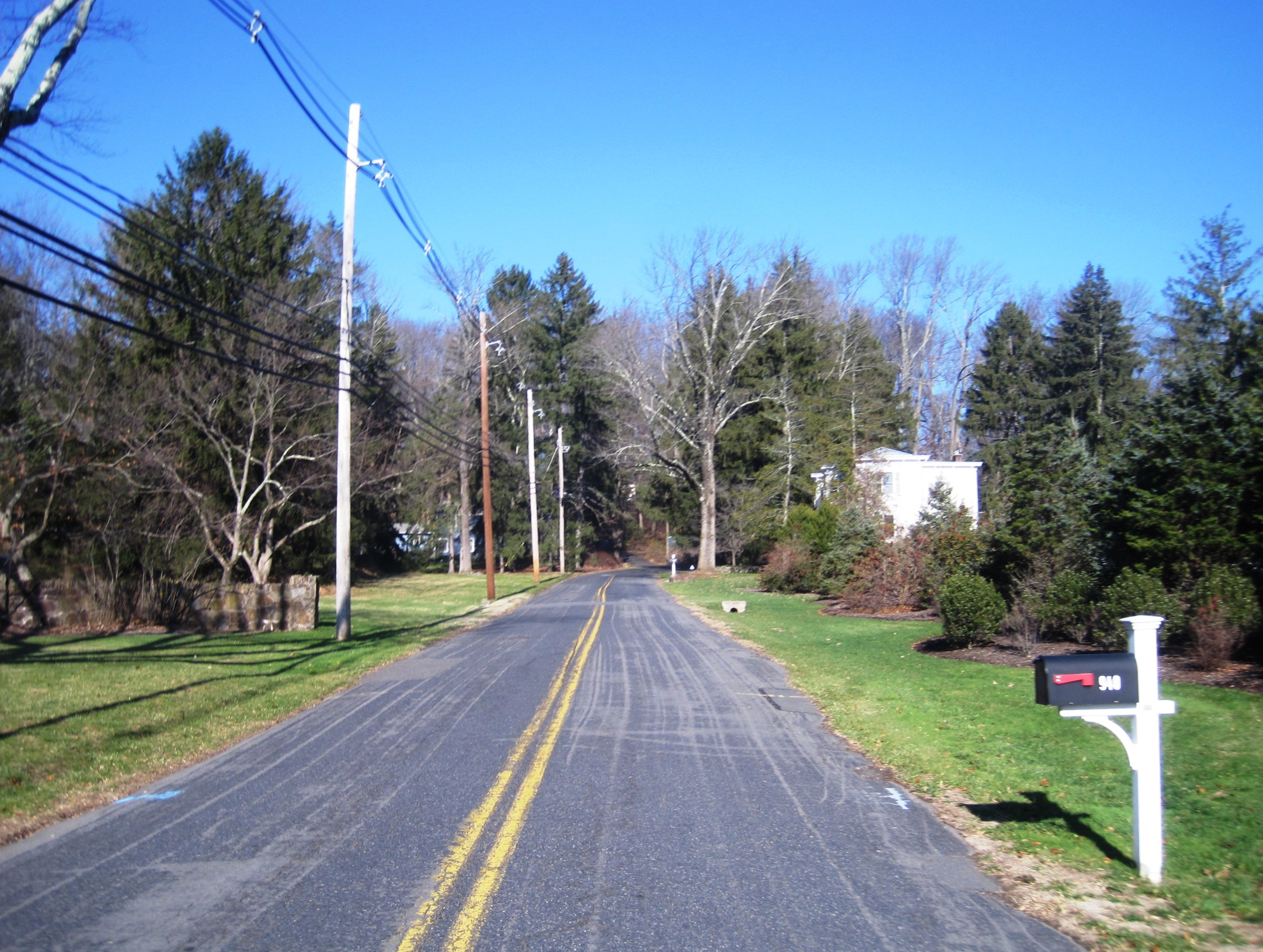
Cedar Grove as seen in December 2015

Cedar Grove is an unincorporated community located within Princeton in Mercer County, in the U.S. state of New Jersey. In the 19th and early 20th centuries it was a village with a church, blacksmith, and schoolhouse. It is located on the brow of a hill along Great Road from Princeton to Blawenburg. The Cedar Grove area was settled by French families of some prominence who were Huguenot refugees, including Louis and Maria Tulane, to whom Paul Tulane, philanthropist and founder of Tulane University, was born in 1801. The suburbanization of Princeton Township (now part of a merged Princeton Borough) in the second half of the 20th century led to a loss of Cedar Grove's place as a distinctive settlement, though some older buildings are still extant. As the main route of Great Road has been relocated to a bypass to the east, the area is much less traveled. Most of the area's land is owned by the Tenacre Foundation, a Christian Science care and nursing facility.
