= Bays Mountain Park =

Nature park and planetarium in Kingsport, Tennessee

Bays Mountain Park & Planetarium
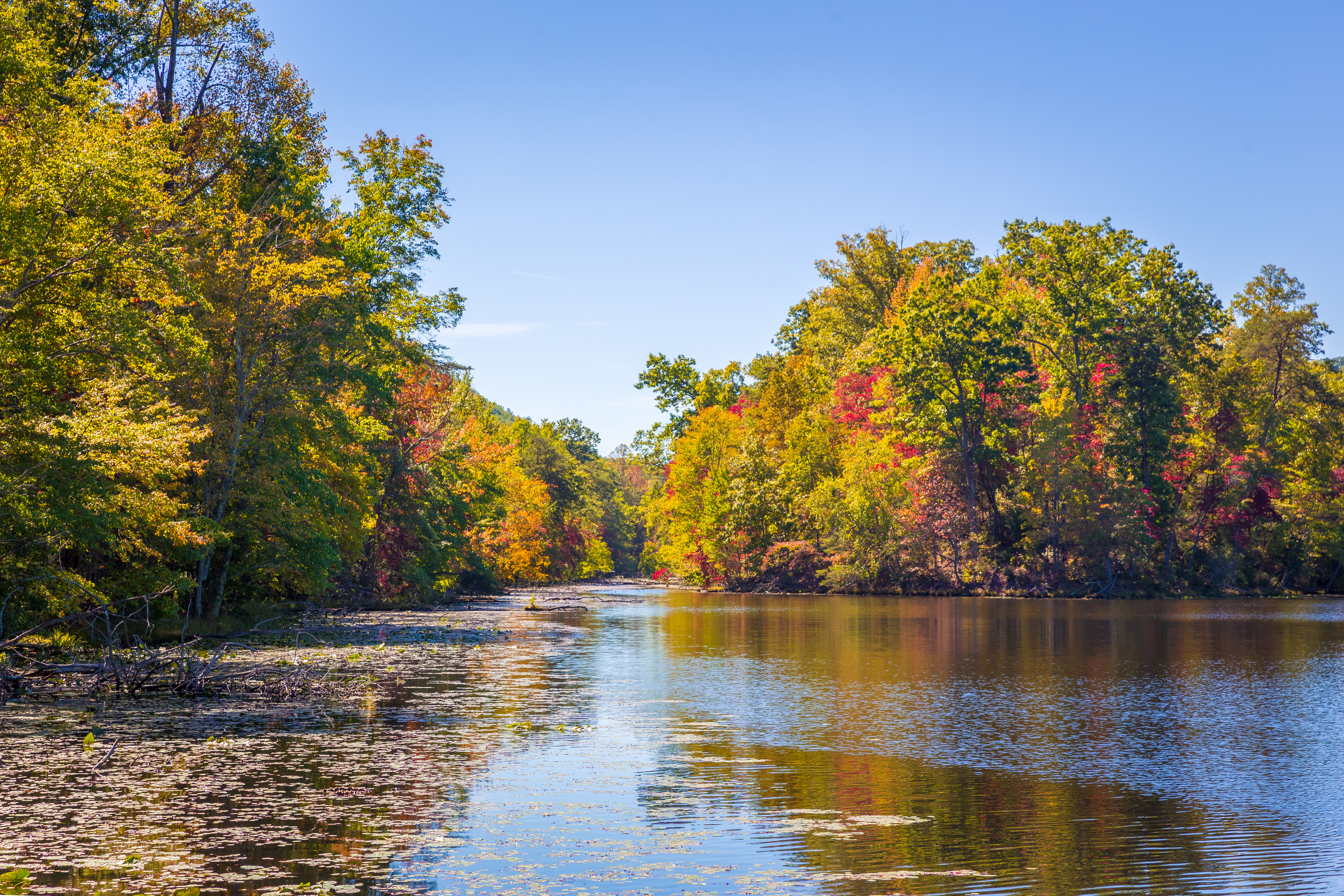
- Interactive map of Bays Mountain Park & Planetarium
- Location: Kingsport, Tennessee
- Coordinates: 36.547299°N 82.561839°W
- Area: 3,750 acres (15.2 km^{2})
- Created: 1965
- Operator: City of Kingsport
- Open: Year Around
- Website: www.baysmountain.com

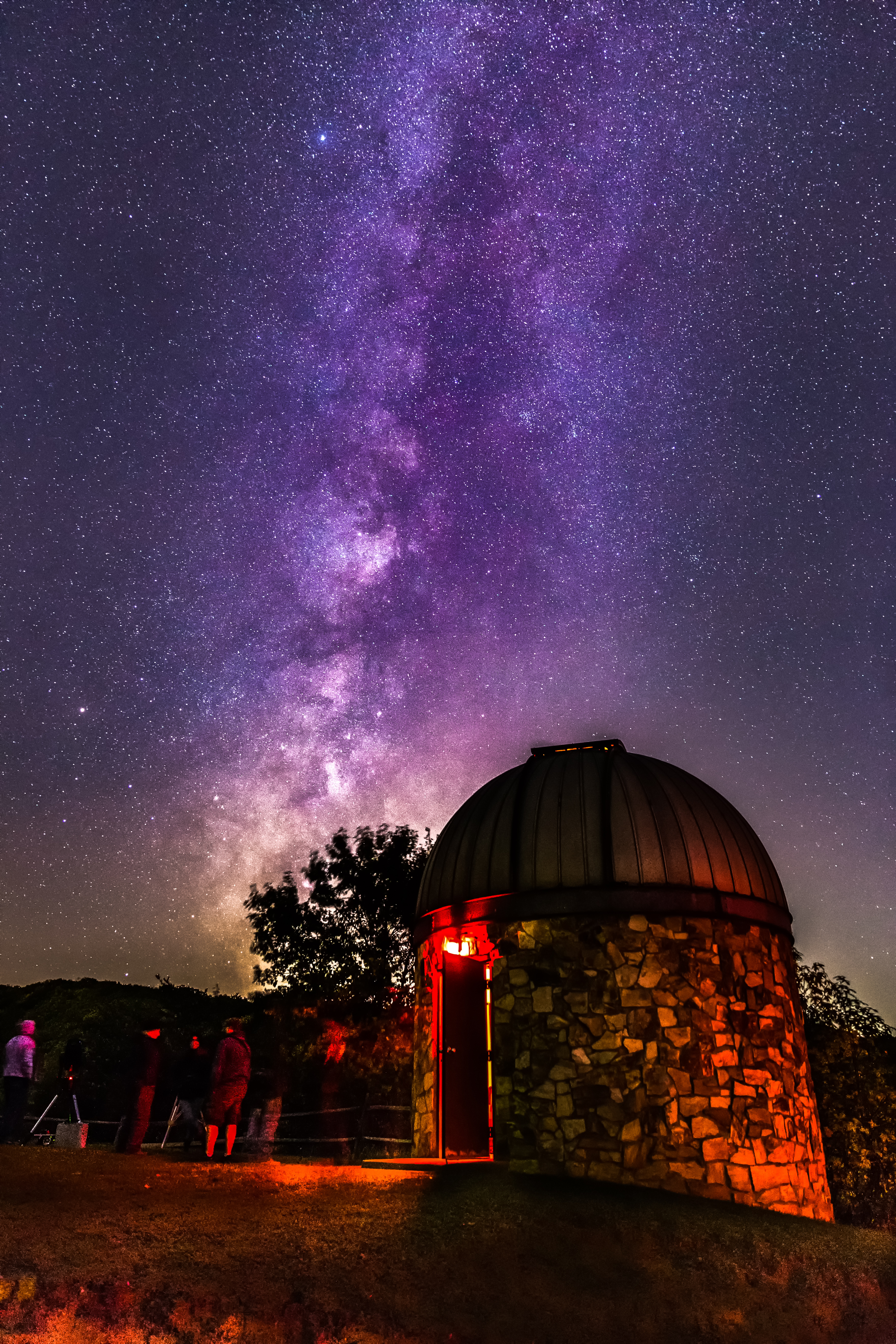
Observatory at night, October 2016

Bays Mountain Park is a 3,750 acres (15.2 km^{2}) nature park and planetarium located on Bays Mountain in Kingsport, Tennessee. Opened in 1971, it features a 44 acre reservoir, over 40 miles of hiking trails, a nature center with a planetarium theater, fire tower, and animal habitats.

The park's reservoir was originally constructed in 1917 as the city's primary water source. The rapidly growing city soon outgrew the reservoir and transitioned to treating the water from the South Fork of Holston River in 1944.

Its nature center and outdoor native animal displays include bobcats, a raptor center and gray wolves, among other exhibits. There is also a herpetarium housing reptiles and amphibians.

Bays Mountain is known for its largely unfragmented oak and pine forest ecosystems. The park provides a natural environment for many native plant species, including sugar maple, tulip poplar, and white oak.

The park also features an educational pontoon boat ride attraction that runs through the Bays Mountain Reservoir, called the Barge Ride.

Other activities include hiking, orienteering, mountain biking, camping, and fishing. There is also the Steadman Heritage Farmstead Museum, a 19th-century period living history farm museum.

In 2017, the Pavilion at Lily Pad Cove was added for events rentals and special events and in 2019, 75 extra parking spots were added to alleviate peak season parking issues.

It is the largest city-owned park in Tennessee.

== Wolves of Bays Mountain ==
Since 1992, Bays Mountain has been home to a pack of gray wolves. As of August 2026, the current population consists of four wolves, three male and one female. All four came to the park in 2014 and 2015.

Though born and raised in captivity, these wolves exhibit many of the same behaviors as wild wolves do.
