= Cedar Grove, Walker County, Georgia =

Unincorporated community in Georgia, U.S.

Coordinates: 34°43′00″N 85°25′34″W

Cedar Grove is an unincorporated community in Walker County, in the U.S. state of Georgia. It is approximately seven miles (11 km) from LaFayette, the county seat.

== History ==
The community was descriptively named for a grove of cedar trees near the original town site. A post office called Cedar Grove was established in 1855, and remained in operation until it was discontinued in 1954.
