= Cedar Grove High School =

Cedar Grove High School may refer to:

- Cedar Grove High School (Georgia),Fairburn, Georgia
- Cedar Grove High School (New Jersey), Cedar Grove, New Jersey
- Cedar Grove Preparatory Academy, Prichard, Alabama
- Cedar Grove School (Old Bridge Township, New Jersey), listed on the NRHP in Middlesex County, New Jersey
- Cedar Grove School, Murfreesboro, Tennessee
- Cedar Grove-Belgium High School, Cedar Grove, Wisconsin

== See also ==
- Grove High School (disambiguation)
