= Cedar Grove Plantation (North Carolina) =

Historic house in North Carolina, US

- U.S. National Register of Historic Places
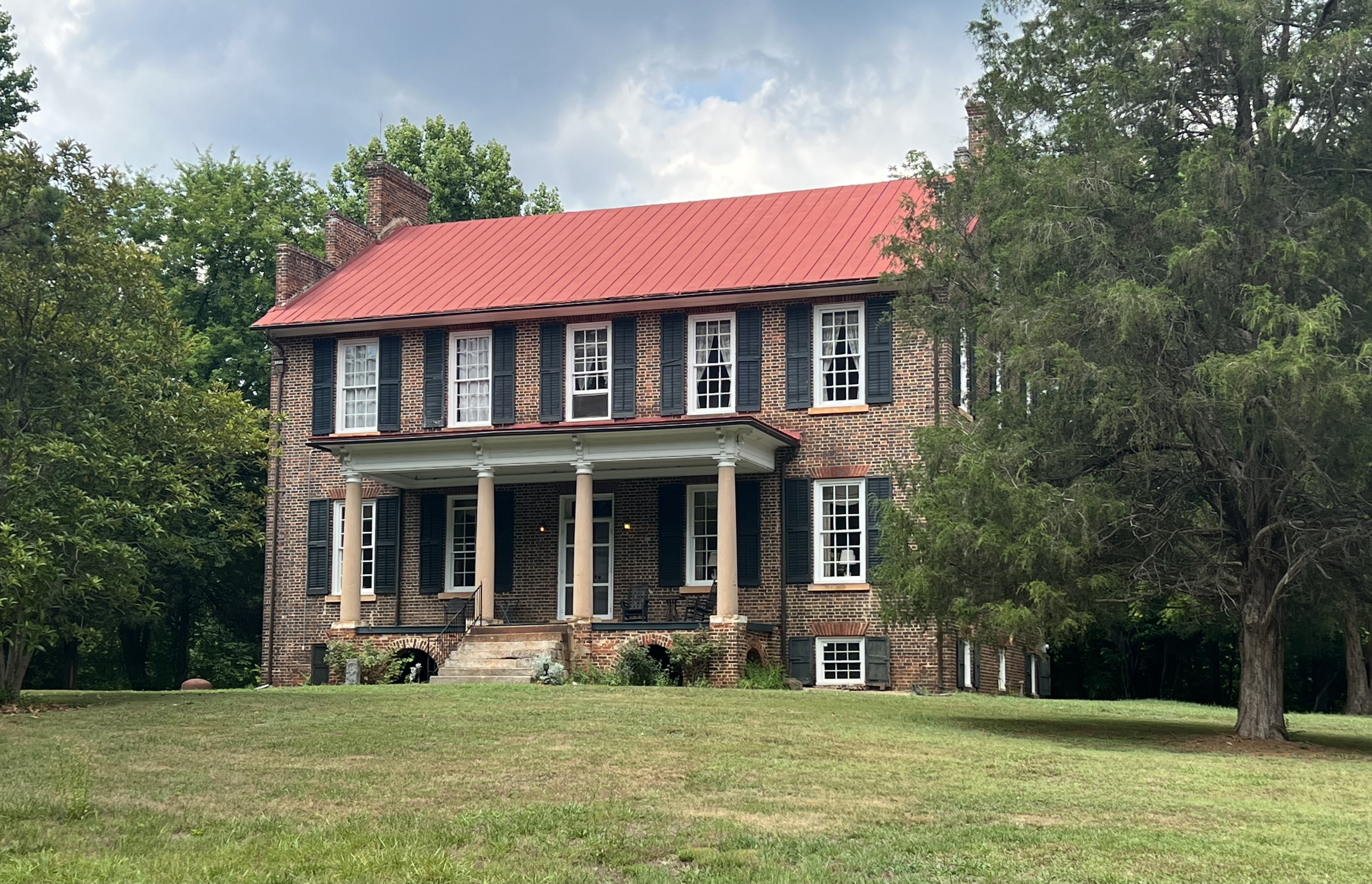

- Location within North Carolina Location within the United States
- Location: Huntersville, Mecklenburg County, North Carolina
- Coordinates: 35.394444°N 80.898611°W
- Area: 6 acres (2.4 ha)
- Built: 1831
- Architectural style: Federal/Greek Revival
- NRHP reference No.: 72000976

Cedar Grove Plantation is a historic house located in Huntersville, North Carolina and built between 1831 and 1833. It was the home of James G. Torrance, a planter living in central Mecklenburg County. It is currently privately owned, and is closed to the public. The plantation was named for its location in the midst of a grove of Cedar trees.

== History ==
Cedar Grove Plantation was built in 1831 by James G. Torrance. Torrance was the son of Hugh Torrance, a Revolutionary War veteran, who owned and operated a store of the site of the plantation in the late 18th and early 19th Century. Torrance built the home to showcase the Torrance family's substantial wealth. They owned thousands of acres of land and enslaved over 100 people.

The Plantation's main crops were cotton and corn, as well as other foods that would have been needed to feed the Torrance family and the enslaved people who lived on the plantation.

When James died, he left the plantation to his third and final wife, Margaret Allison Torrance.

The House is noted for its combination of both Federal and Greek Revival architecture.

== Architecture ==
The building is a historic plantation house located near Huntersville, Mecklenburg County, North Carolina. It is a two-story, five bay by three bay, Greek Revival-style brick mansion. It has gable roof and features high stepped brick end parapets that incorporate chimneys. The front and rear facades have one-story, three bay porches supported by stuccoed brick Doric order columns.
