= Cedar Grove, Randolph County, North Carolina =

Unincorporated community in North Carolina, US

Coordinates: 35°40′32″N 079°53′19″W

Cedar Grove is an unincorporated community in Randolph County, North Carolina, United States.
