= Colonial Heights, Tennessee =

Colonial Heights
- CDP
- Location of Colonial Heights, Tennessee
- Coordinates: 36°28′40″N 82°30′19″W
- Country: United States
- State: Tennessee
- County: Sullivan

Area
  - Total: 4.08 sq mi (10.58 km^{2})
  - Land: 3.81 sq mi (9.88 km^{2})
  - Water: 0.27 sq mi (0.70 km^{2})
- Elevation: 1,437 ft (438 m)

Population (2020)
  - Total: 3,055
  - Density: 800.5/sq mi (309.08/km^{2})
- Time zone: UTC-5 (Eastern (EST))
  - Summer (DST): UTC-4 (EDT)
- ZIP code: 37663
- Area codes: 423 and 729
- FIPS code: 47-16500
- GNIS feature ID: 1281022

Colonial Heights is a census-designated place (CDP) in Sullivan County, Tennessee, United States. It is located within the city of Kingsport.

The population was 3,055 at the 2020 census down from 6,934 at the 2010 census, due to annexation by the city of Kingsport.

It is part of the Kingsport-Bristol-Bristol, TN-VA Metropolitan Statistical Area, which is a component of the Johnson City-Kingsport-Bristol, TN-VA Combined Statistical Area, commonly known as the "Tri-Cities" region.

== Geography ==
Colonial Heights is located at 36°28′40″N 82°30′19″W (36.477769, -82.505278).

According to the United States Census Bureau, the CDP has a total area of 6.2 square miles (16 km^{2}), of which, 6.0 square miles (16 km^{2}) of it is land and 0.3 square miles (0.78 km^{2}) of it (4.15%) is water.

== Demographics ==
Historical population
Census	Pop.	Note	%±
2000	7,067		—
2010	6,934		−1.9%
2020	3,055		−55.9%
U.S. Decennial Census

=== 2020 census ===
As of the 2020 census, there were 3,055 people, 1,318 households, and 956 families residing in the CDP. The median age was 45.9 years. 18.5% of residents were under the age of 18 and 21.0% of residents were 65 years of age or older. For every 100 females, there were 93.0 males, and for every 100 females age 18 and over, there were 90.9 males age 18 and over.

98.2% of residents lived in urban areas, while 1.8% lived in rural areas.

Of households in the CDP, 27.3% had children under the age of 18 living in them. Of all households, 53.5% were married-couple households, 15.6% were households with a male householder and no spouse or partner present, and 25.8% were households with a female householder and no spouse or partner present. About 27.3% of all households were made up of individuals, and 12.9% had someone living alone who was 65 years of age or older.

There were 1,382 housing units, of which 6.1% were vacant. The homeowner vacancy rate was 0.8% and the rental vacancy rate was 7.7%.

Colonial Heights racial composition
Race	Number	Percentage
White (non-Hispanic)	2,824	92.44%
Black or African American (non-Hispanic)	27	0.88%
Native American	4	0.13%
Asian	23	0.75%
Other/Mixed	111	3.63%
Hispanic or Latino	66	2.16%

=== 2000 census ===
As of the census of 2000, there were 7,067 people, 2,811 households, and 2,217 families residing in the CDP. The population density was 1,086.5 inhabitants per square mile (419.5/km^{2}). There were 2,936 housing units at an average density of 451.4 per square mile (174.3/km^{2}). The racial makeup of the CDP was 97.59% White, 0.88% African American, 0.16% Native American, 0.67% Asian, 0.03% Pacific Islander, 0.20% from other races, and 0.48% from two or more races. Hispanic or Latino of any race were 0.72% of the population.

There were 2,811 households, out of which 31.5% had children under the age of 18 living with them, 68.9% were married couples living together, 7.6% had a female householder with no husband present, and 21.1% were non-families. 18.7% of all households were made up of individuals, and 7.2% had someone living alone who was 65 years of age or older. The average household size was 2.51 and the average family size was 2.86.

In the CDP, the population was spread out, with 23.1% under the age of 18, 5.8% from 18 to 24, 27.8% from 25 to 44, 28.5% from 45 to 64, and 14.8% who were 65 years of age or older. The median age was 41 years. For every 100 females, there were 94.0 males. For every 100 females age 18 and over, there were 91.7 males.

The median income for a household in the CDP was $48,145, and the median income for a family was $53,651. Males had a median income of $41,604 versus $25,045 for females. The per capita income for the CDP was $26,210. About 4.8% of families and 6.2% of the population were below the poverty line, including 8.4% of those under age 18 and 4.2% of those age 65 or over.
