= Kingsport, Tennessee =

Kingsport
- City
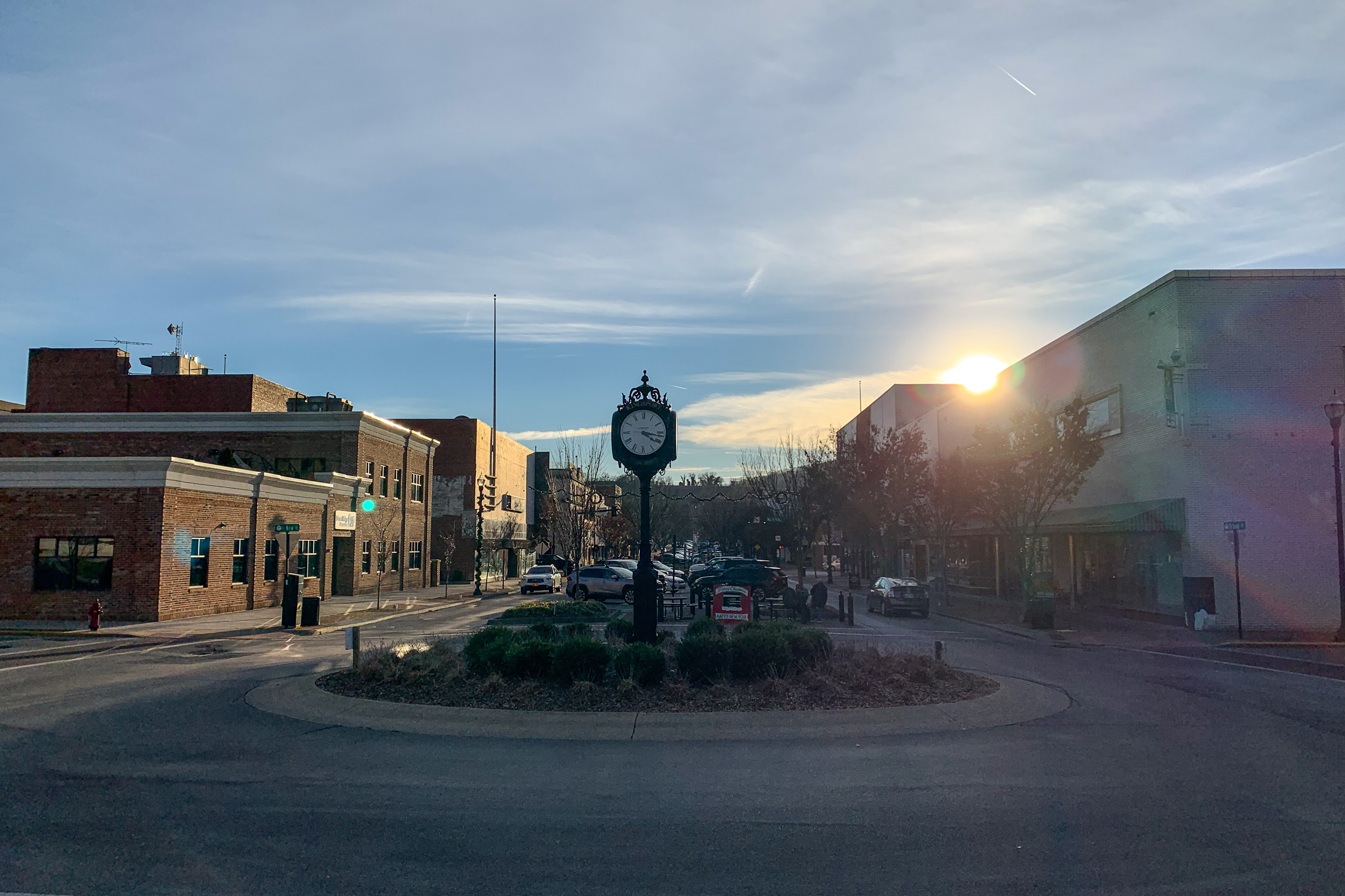
- Broad Street in Downtown Kingsport

- Flag Seal Logo
- Nickname: The Model City
- Location of Kingsport in Sullivan and Hawkins counties, Tennessee

- Location within Tennessee Location within the United States
- Coordinates: 36°32′N 82°33′W
- Country: United States
- State: Tennessee
- Counties: Sullivan, Hawkins
- Settled: 1771
- Chartered/Rechartered: 1822, 1917

Government
  - Type: Council-manager
  - Mayor: Paul W. Montgomery
  - City Manager: Chris McCartt

Area
  - City: 53.53 sq mi (138.63 km^{2})
  - Land: 52.60 sq mi (136.24 km^{2})
  - Water: 0.92 sq mi (2.38 km^{2})
- Elevation: 1,211 ft (369 m)

Population (2020)
  - City: 55,442
  - Rank: 12th in Tennessee
  - Density: 1,053.9/sq mi (406.93/km^{2})
  - Urban: 98,411 (US: 316th)
  - Metro: 309,283 (US: 161st)
- Time zone: UTC−5 (EST)
  - Summer (DST): UTC−4 (EDT)
- ZIP codes: 37660, 37662, 37663, 37664, 37665 & 37669
- Area codes: 423 and 729
- FIPS code: 47-39560
- GNIS feature ID: 1303478
- Website: kingsporttn.gov

Kingsport is a city in Sullivan and Hawkins counties in the U.S. state of Tennessee. It lies along the Holston River and had a population of 55,442 at the 2020 census. It is the largest city in the Kingsport–Bristol metropolitan area, which had 307,613 residents in 2020. The metro area is a component of the larger Tri-Cities region of Tennessee and Virginia, with a population of 508,260 in 2020.

Kingsport was chartered in 1822. The city's name is a simplification of King's Port, originally referring to the area on the Holston River known as King's Boat Yard, the head of navigation for the Tennessee Valley. Kingsport is commonly included in what is known as the "Mountain Empire" in southwest Virginia and northeastern Tennessee, a nickname which used in local groups and organizations.

== History ==
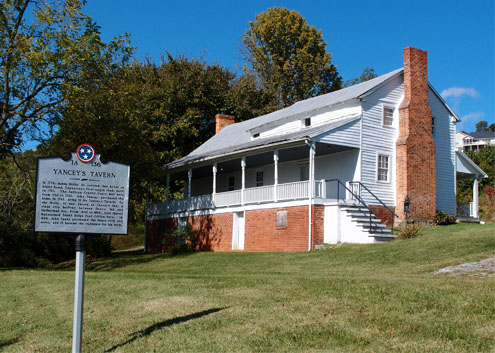
Yancey's Tavern was an important stagecoach stop for travelers in the 18th and 19th centuries.

Kingsport was developed after the Revolutionary War, at the confluence of the North and South Forks of the Holston River. In 1787 it was known as "Salt Lick" for an ancient mineral lick. It was first settled along the banks of the South Fork, about a mile from the confluence. The Long Island of the Holston River is near the confluence, which is mostly within the present-day corporate boundaries of Kingsport. The island was an important site for the Cherokee, colonial pioneers and early settlers, and specifically mentioned in the 1770 Treaty of Lochaber.

Early settlements at the site were used as a staging ground for other pioneers who were traveling overland on the Wilderness Road leading to Kentucky through the Cumberland Gap. First chartered in 1822, Kingsport became an important shipping port on the Holston River. Goods originating for many miles around from the surrounding countryside were loaded onto barges for the journey downriver to the Tennessee River at Knoxville.

In the Battle of Kingsport (December 13, 1864) during the Civil War, a force of 300 Confederates under Colonel Richard Morgan stopped a larger Union force for nearly two days. An army of over 5,500 troops under command of Major General George Stoneman had left Knoxville to raid Confederate targets in Virginia: the salt works at Saltville, the lead works at Wytheville, and the iron works in Marion. While Col. Morgan's small band held off a main Union force under Major General Cullem Gillem on the opposite side the Holston River, Union Col. Samuel Patton took a force of cavalry to a ford in the river 2.5 miles (4.0 km) north and came down behind the Confederates. Out-numbered, out-flanked, and demoralized by the bitter winter weather, Col. Morgan surrendered. The Confederates suffered 18 dead, and 84 prisoners of war were sent to a Union prison in Knoxville.

The city lost its charter after a downturn in its fortunes precipitated by the Civil War.

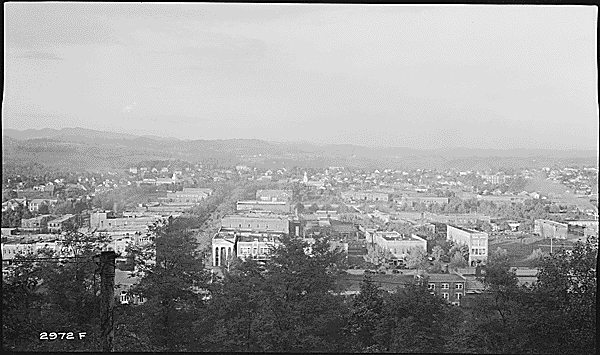
Kingsport in 1937

On September 12, 1916, Kingsport residents demanded the death of circus elephant Mary (an Asian elephant that performed in the Sparks World-famous Shows Circus). She had killed city hotel worker Walter Eldridge, who was hired by the circus the day before as an assistant elephant trainer. Eldridge was attacked and killed by the elephant while he was leading her to a pond. The elephant was impounded by the local sheriff. Leaders of several nearby towns threatened to prevent the circus from performing if it included the elephant. The circus owner, Charlie Sparks, reluctantly decided that the only way to quickly resolve the situation was to hold a public execution. On the following day, she was transported by rail to Erwin, Tennessee, where a crowd of over 2,500 people assembled in the Clinchfield Railroad yard to watch her hang from a railroad crane.

Re-chartered in 1917, Kingsport was an early example of a "garden city". Part of it was designed by city planner and landscape architect John Nolen of Cambridge, Massachusetts. It was nicknamed as the "Model City" from this plan, which organized the town into areas for commerce, churches, housing and industry. Most of the land on the river was devoted to industry. Most of the Long Island is now occupied by Eastman Chemical Company, which is headquartered in Kingsport. As part of this plan, Kingsport built some of the earliest traffic circles (roundabouts) in the United States.

Into the 1950s, two important public works projects were constructed: the Boone Dam and the Fort Patrick Henry Dam, hydroelectric dams built along the South Fork Holston River. Kingsport was among the first municipalities to adopt a city manager form of government, to professionalize operations of city departments. It developed its school system based on a model promoted by Columbia University. Pal's Sudden Service, a regional fast-food restaurant chain, opened its first location in 1956 and is headquartered in Kingsport. In 2001, Pal's Sudden Service, won the Malcolm Baldrige National Quality Award, becoming the first restaurant company to receive the award.

== Geography ==
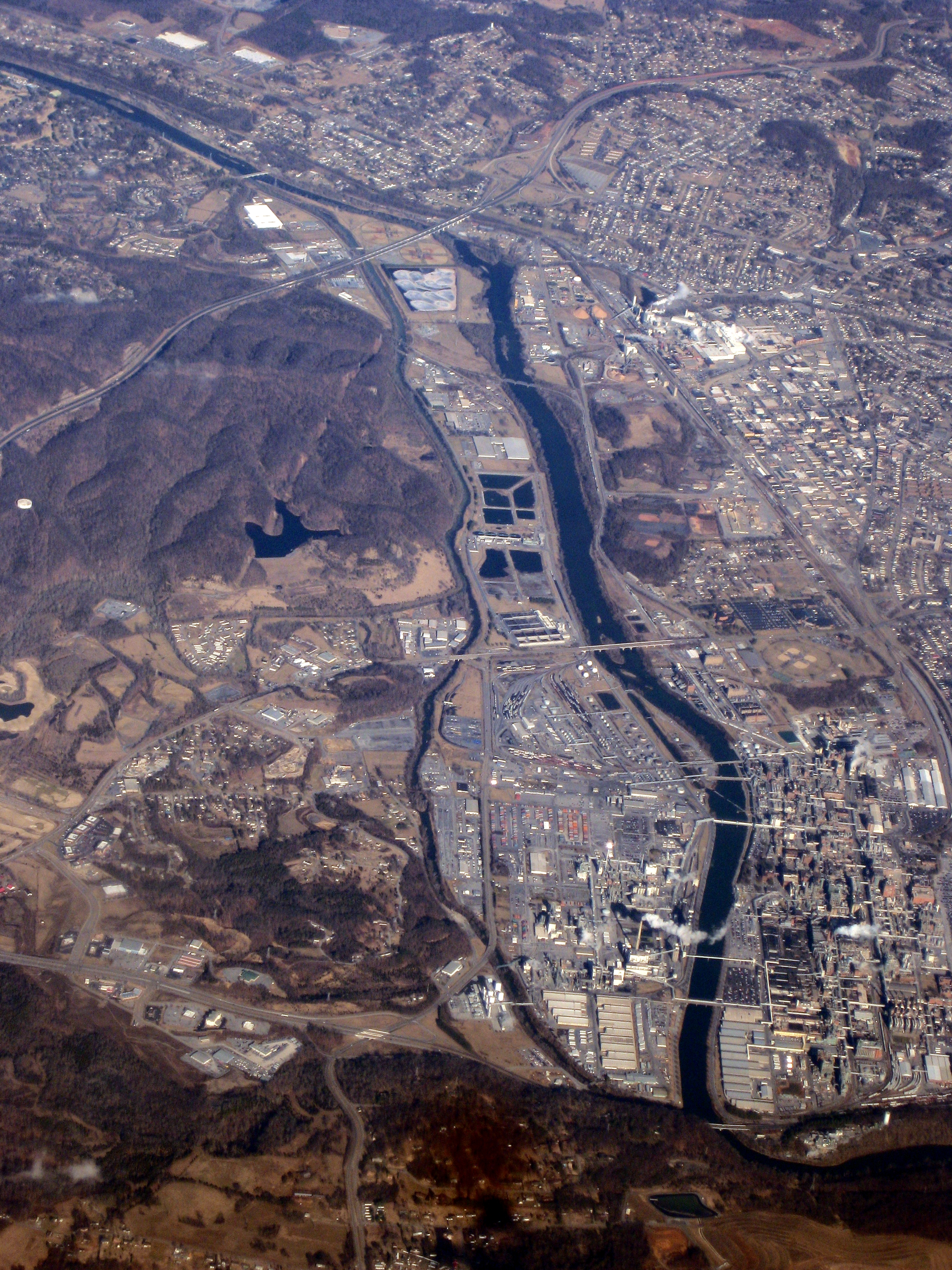
Long Island of the Holston and downtown Kingsport.

Kingsport is located in western Sullivan County at the intersection of U.S. Routes 11W and 23. Kingsport is the northwest terminus of Interstate 26.

The city is bordered to the west by the town of Mount Carmel, to the southeast by unincorporated Colonial Heights, and to the northeast by unincorporated Bloomingdale. The Kingsport city limits extend west into Hawkins County and north to the Virginia border.

According to the United States Census Bureau, the city has a total area of 50.8 square miles (131.5 km^{2}), of which 49.8 square miles (129.0 km^{2}) are land and 0.93 square miles (2.4 km^{2}), or 1.86%, are water. Most of the water area is in the South Fork Holston River.

=== Climate ===
Climate data for Kingsport, Tennessee (1991–2020 normals, extremes 1916–present)
Month	Jan	Feb	Mar	Apr	May	Jun	Jul	Aug	Sep	Oct	Nov	Dec	Year
Record high °F (°C)	79 (26)	82 (28)	89 (32)	92 (33)	98 (37)	104 (40)	102 (39)	103 (39)	102 (39)	95 (35)	83 (28)	80 (27)	104 (40)
Mean daily maximum °F (°C)	46.4 (8.0)	50.9 (10.5)	60.1 (15.6)	70.5 (21.4)	78.0 (25.6)	84.4 (29.1)	87.0 (30.6)	86.3 (30.2)	81.2 (27.3)	70.8 (21.6)	59.2 (15.1)	49.5 (9.7)	68.7 (20.4)
Daily mean °F (°C)	36.9 (2.7)	40.3 (4.6)	48.1 (8.9)	57.6 (14.2)	66.0 (18.9)	73.2 (22.9)	76.5 (24.7)	75.5 (24.2)	69.8 (21.0)	58.4 (14.7)	47.3 (8.5)	39.9 (4.4)	57.5 (14.2)
Mean daily minimum °F (°C)	27.3 (−2.6)	29.6 (−1.3)	36.2 (2.3)	44.7 (7.1)	54.0 (12.2)	62.1 (16.7)	66.0 (18.9)	64.6 (18.1)	58.3 (14.6)	46.1 (7.8)	35.5 (1.9)	30.3 (−0.9)	46.2 (7.9)
Record low °F (°C)	−18 (−28)	−11 (−24)	−2 (−19)	18 (−8)	30 (−1)	39 (4)	46 (8)	45 (7)	32 (0)	19 (−7)	2 (−17)	−7 (−22)	−18 (−28)
Average precipitation inches (mm)	3.88 (99)	4.05 (103)	4.14 (105)	4.05 (103)	3.76 (96)	3.71 (94)	5.05 (128)	3.81 (97)	2.98 (76)	2.43 (62)	3.17 (81)	4.00 (102)	45.03 (1,144)
Average snowfall inches (cm)	1.7 (4.3)	1.6 (4.1)	0.7 (1.8)	0.0 (0.0)	0.0 (0.0)	0.0 (0.0)	0.0 (0.0)	0.0 (0.0)	0.0 (0.0)	0.0 (0.0)	0.1 (0.25)	1.0 (2.5)	5.1 (13)
Average precipitation days (≥ 0.01 in)	12.1	11.5	12.9	11.5	12.2	11.7	12.8	10.2	8.6	7.8	9.7	12.2	133.2
Average snowy days (≥ 0.1 in)	1.1	0.6	0.3	0.0	0.0	0.0	0.0	0.0	0.0	0.0	0.1	0.5	2.6
Source: NOAA

=== Neighborhoods ===
Neighborhoods in Kingsport include:

- Allandale
- Bloomingdale
- Borden Village
- Carter's Valley
- Cliffside
- Colonial Heights
- Cooks Valley
- Downtown
- Fairacres
- Fort Robinson
- Green Acres
- Highland Park
- Hillcrest
- Indian Springs (Fall Creek & Airport)
- Litz Manor
- Lynn Garden
- Malabar Heights
- Meadowview
- Midtown
- Orebank
- Preston Forest
- Preston Woods
- Ridgefields
- Riverfront
- Riverview
- Rock Springs
- Sevier Terrace

== Demographics ==
Historical population
Census	Pop.	Note	%±
1920	5,692		—
1930	11,914		109.3%
1940	14,404		20.9%
1950	19,571		35.9%
1960	26,314		34.5%
1970	31,938		21.4%
1980	32,027		0.3%
1990	36,365		13.5%
2000	44,905		23.5%
2010	48,205		7.3%
2020	55,442		15.0%
2025 (est.)	57,530	▲	3.8%
U.S. Decennial Census

=== 2020 census ===
As of the 2020 census, Kingsport had a population of 55,442 and 14,273 families residing in the city. The median age was 44.0 years, 20.4% of residents were under the age of 18 and 22.9% were 65 years of age or older, and there were 88.8 males for every 100 females and 85.6 males for every 100 females age 18 and over.

92.5% of residents lived in urban areas, while 7.5% lived in rural areas.

There were 24,169 households in Kingsport, of which 26.1% had children under the age of 18 living in them. Of all households, 42.9% were married-couple households, 18.3% were households with a male householder and no spouse or partner present, and 32.5% were households with a female householder and no spouse or partner present. About 33.6% of all households were made up of individuals and 16.1% had someone living alone who was 65 years of age or older.

There were 27,224 housing units, of which 11.2% were vacant. The homeowner vacancy rate was 2.4% and the rental vacancy rate was 11.3%.

Racial composition as of the 2020 census
Race	Number	Percent
White	48,720	87.9%
Black or African American	2,048	3.7%
American Indian and Alaska Native	175	0.3%
Asian	756	1.4%
Native Hawaiian and Other Pacific Islander	15	0.0%
Some other race	760	1.4%
Two or more races	2,968	5.4%
Hispanic or Latino (of any race)	1,719	3.1%

=== 2000 census ===
As of the census of 2000, there were 44,905 people, 19,662 households and 12,642 families residing in the city. The population density was 1,018.9 inhabitants per square mile (393.4/km^{2}). There were 21,796 housing units at an average density of 494.6 per square mile (191.0/km^{2}). The racial makeup of the city was 93.32% White, 4.07% African American, 0.79% Asian, 0.24% American Indian/Alaska Native, 0.02% Native Hawaiian/Pacific Islander, 0.34% some other race, and 1.06% two or more races. Hispanic or Latino of any race were 1.05% of the population.

There were 19,662 households, of which 26.5% had children under the age of 18 living with them, 48.5% were married couples living together, 12.7% had a female householder with no husband present, and 35.7% were non-families. 32.5% of all households were made up of individuals, and 14.7% had someone living alone who was 65 years of age or older. The average household size was 2.22, and the average family size was 2.80.

In the city, the population was spread out, with 21.7% under the age of 18, 6.5% from 18 to 24, 26.2% from 25 to 44, 25.3% from 45 to 64, and 20.3% who were 65 years of age or older. The median age was 42 years. For every 100 females, there were 84.1 males. For every 100 females age 18 and over, there were 79.4 males.

The median income for a household in the city was $30,524, and the median income for a family was $40,183. Males had a median income of $33,075 versus $23,217 for females. The per capita income for the city was $20,549. About 14.2% of families and 17.1% of the population were below the poverty line, including 24.9% of those under age 18 and 13.0% of those age 65 or over.

== Economy ==
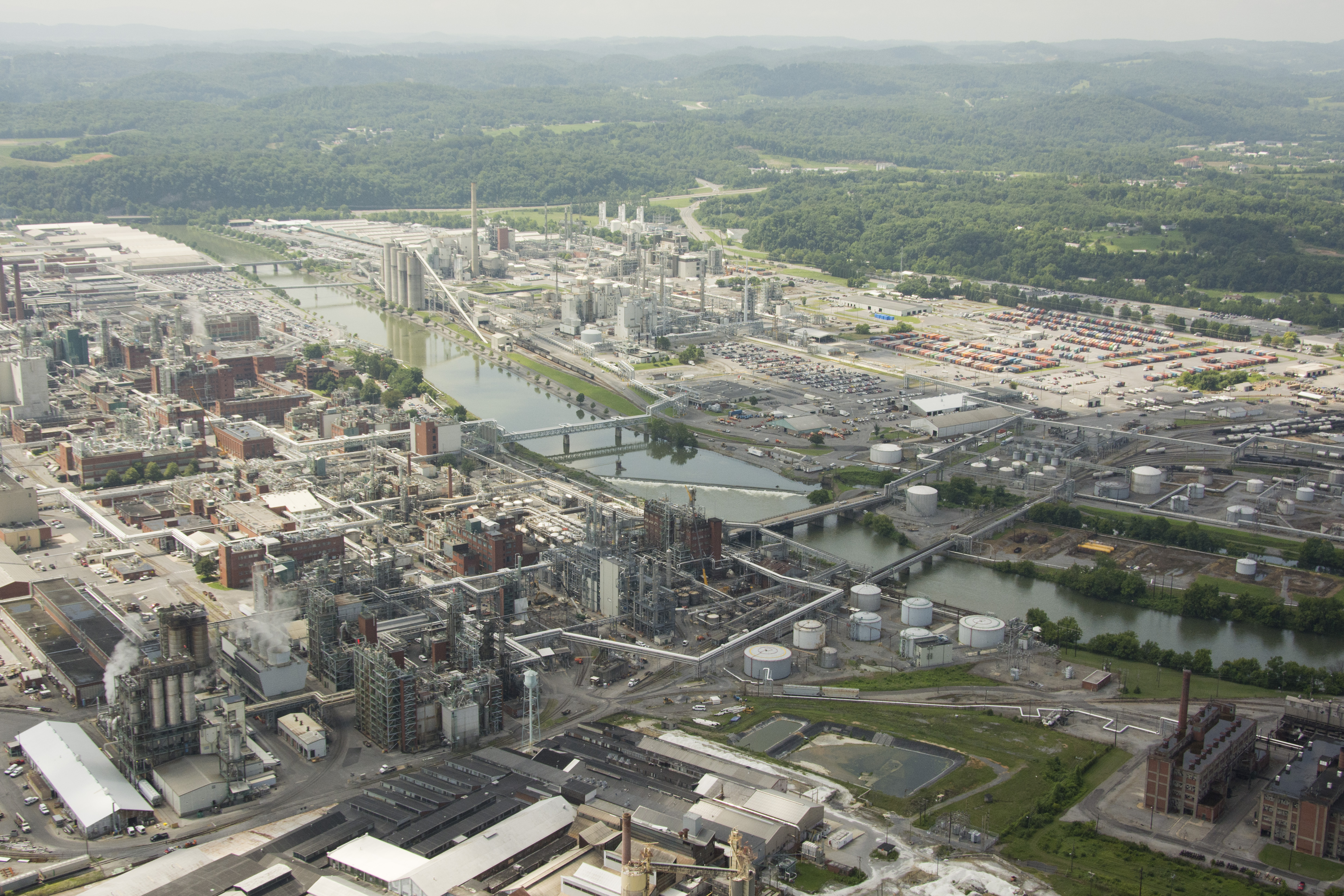
Aerial view of the Eastman Chemical Company plant in Kingsport

Eastman Chemical Company's first chemical plant along with its world headquarters are located in Kingsport. Eastman also operates a molecular recycling plant in Kingsport. Accsys Technologies, through a joint venture with Eastman, operates an acetylated wood manufacturing plant in the city.

Domtar operates a recycled containerboard facility in Kingsport that formerly was a paper mill established in 1916. Domtar converted the production of uncoated freesheet paper to containerboard in 2023. It is now home to one of the largest recycled containerboard machines in North America, which produces about 600,000 tons of recycled liner board and corrugated medium annually.

Holston Army Ammunition Plant operated by BAE Systems' Ordnance Systems, Inc. manufactures a wide range of secondary detonating explosives for the Department of Defense.

In 2019, Kingsport's gross metropolitan product was reported to be US$14.1 billion.

=== Top employers ===
According to the City of Kingsport's annual comprehensive financial report for 2021, the top employers in the city are:

#	Employer	Employees
1	Eastman Chemical Company	6,500
2	Partner Industrial	2,000
3	Ballad Health Holston Valley Hospital	1,355
4	Kingsport City Schools	1,147
5	BAE Systems	948
6	City of Kingsport	778
7	Eastman Credit Union	648
8	Holston Medical Group	595
9	TEC Industrial Maintenance & Construction	394
10	Ballad Health Indian Path Hospital	331

== Culture ==
=== Museums ===
The Netherland Inn was constructed in 1802 by William King, whom the city of Kingsport is named after, to act as a boatyard to ship salt. In 1818 the property was sold to the Netherland family and they turned it into an inn and tavern. The inn and its grounds, which have been fully restored as a historic house museum, are open to tours and special events throughout the year. Additional buildings on the property include a reconstructed kitchen wing, a Log Cabin which housed Daniel Boone and his family between 1773 and 1775, the Weilhouse which shelters an old stone-line well, a schoolhouse, and the Pence Reception Center and Gift Shop.

=== Leisure ===
The Kingsport Carousel, which was constructed by 300 local volunteers and was made using a refurbished 1956 Allan Herschell Company carousel frame, was completed in 2015. Pal and Sharon Barger, owners of Pal's Sudden Service which is headquartered in Kingsport, sponsored the creation of Pal's Roundhouse, a climate controlled building which houses the carousel.

The Kingsport Aquatic Center is a popular swimming area located in the city of Kingsport and has several indoor and outdoor pools and diving boards, including an Olympic-size swimming pool. As well there are water attractions focused on children's entertainment, stadium seating with a capacity of 400 individuals, and multiple diving boards.

=== Cuisine ===
The Long Island iced tea is claimed to have been invented in the 1920s during Prohibition by an "Old Man Bishop", who was known to have been an illegal liquor distiller, on Long Island in Kingsport. The city of Kingsport has embraced this claim and has created a Long Island iced tea trail with several involved local restaurants and businesses, as well downtown Kingsport is home to a mural featuring the city's claim to being the birthplace of the Long Island iced tea.

=== Annual festivals ===
Fun Fest, Kingsport's annual community unity themed festival, began in 1981 and lasts for nine days in July. Fun Fest has a red and yellow colored sun mascot named Festus. An estimated 100,000 people attend Fun Fest annually. The annual Fun Fest celebration usually has a parade, hot air balloons, fireworks, concerts, block parties, and other events.

The Santa Train, which is an annual Christmas celebration which is currently operated by CSX, takes place on the Saturday before Thanksgiving. Kingsport is the final stop of the Santa Train, which begins its journey in Kentucky. Volunteers aboard the train hand out winter clothes, backpacks, and toys to children at each stop. The festival originated in Kingsport in 1943, when a group of Kingsport businessmen partnered with the Clinchfield Railroad to uplift spirits during World War II.

=== In popular culture ===
- The vessel SS Kingsport Victory, which later became USNS Kingsport, was named in honor of the city.

== Sports ==
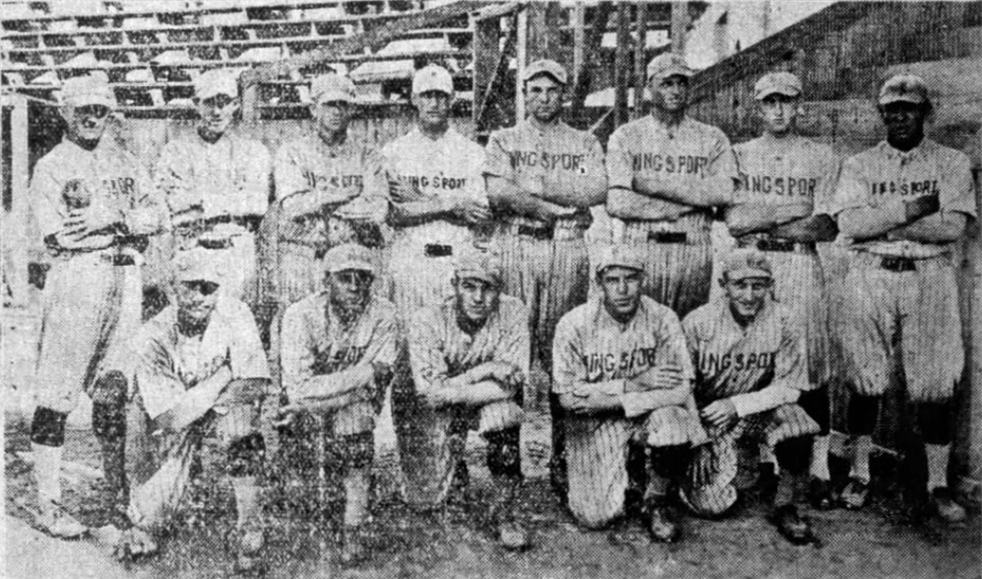
The 1921 Kingsport Indians were the first professional baseball team from Kingsport.

The city is home to the Kingsport Axmen, a collegiate summer baseball team of the Appalachian League. The nickname is in reference to frontiersman Daniel Boone, who began the Wilderness Road in Kingsport. The Axmen play their home games at Hunter Wright Stadium, which is named after former mayor Hunter Wright.

Professional baseball was first played in Kingsport, by the Kingsport Indians in the Appalachian League from 1921 to 1925. The team went dormant for 12 years before it returned to the circuit as the Kingsport Cherokees from 1938 to 1955—with the exception of the 1942 season as the Kingsport Dodgers and as members of the Mountain States League in 1953 and 1954. The club was later known as the Kingsport Orioles (1957), Kingsport Pirates (1960–1963), Kingsport Royals (1969–1973), and Kingsport Braves (1974–1979). The Kingsport Mets were members of the Appy League from 1980 to 2020, except for the 1983 season when the New York Mets temporarily relocated the team to Sarasota, Florida, as the Gulf Coast League Mets, while their home ballpark was being renovated. In conjunction with a contraction of Minor League Baseball beginning with the 2021 season, the Appalachian League was reorganized as a collegiate summer baseball league, and the Mets were replaced by the Axmen, a new franchise in the revamped league designed for rising college freshman and sophomores.

== Parks and recreation ==
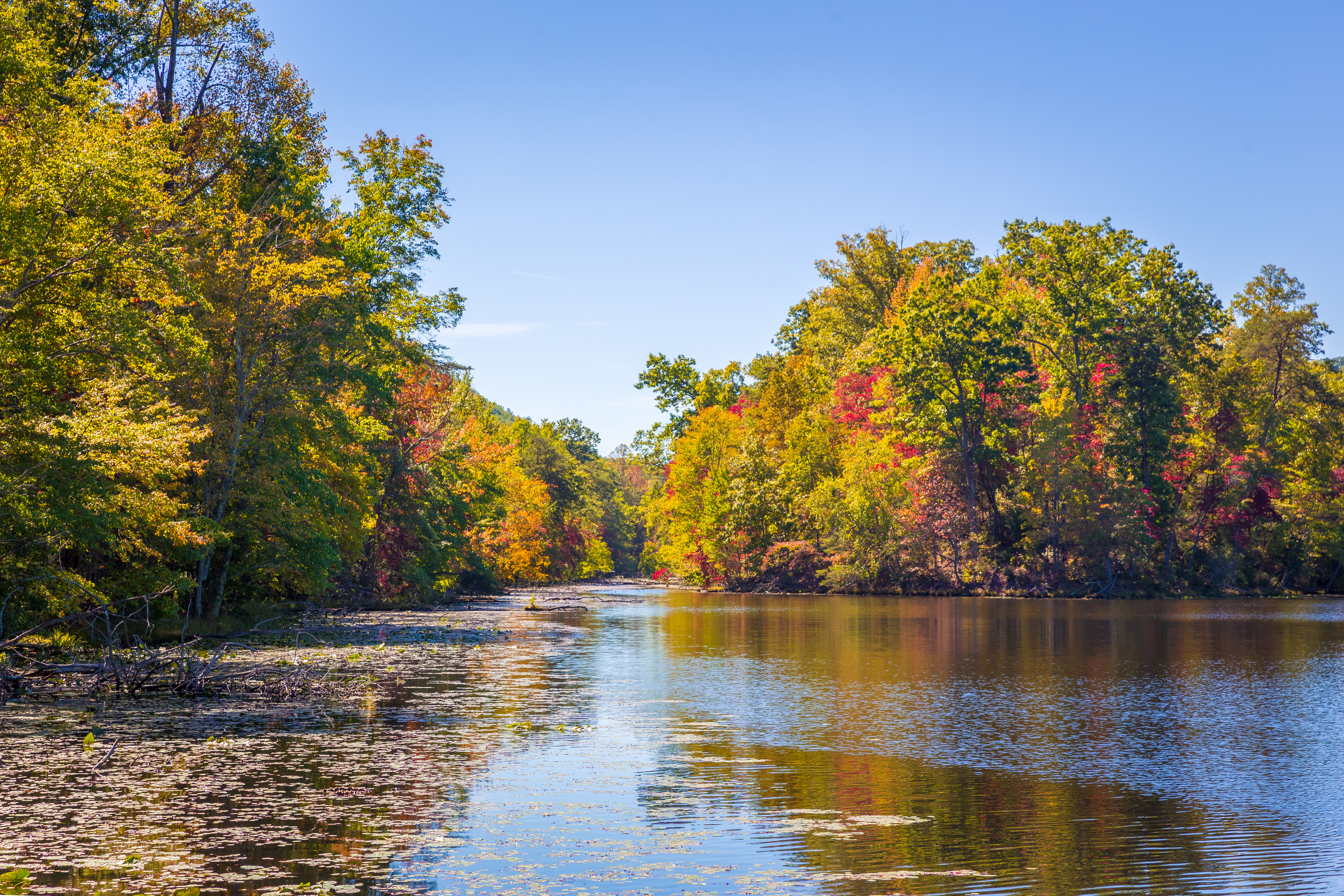
Bays Mountain Park

The Kingsport Parks and Recreation manages several parks within the city.

- Bays Mountain Park
- Borden Park
- Dogwood Park
- Edinburgh Park
- Kingsport Greenbelt Walking/Cycling Trail
- Riverview Splash Pad
- Scott Adams Skate Park

Warrior's Path State Park, a 950 acres (3.8 km^{2}) state park, is located in the Colonial Heights area of the city.

== Government ==
=== Municipal ===
Kingsport uses the council-manager system, which was established in 1917 when the city was re-chartered. Kingsport is governed locally by a seven-member Board of Mayor and Aldermen. The citizens elect the mayor to a two-year term and the six aldermen to four-year terms. The elections take place in odd-numbered years, with the mayor and three aldermen elected every two years. New terms begin on July 1. The board elects a vice mayor from among the six aldermen. The council or board then hires a professional city manager.

In late 2021, or early 2022, the board decided to move the election to coincide with the primary elections in Tennessee in August of every even-numbered year. This changes the Mayoral and Alderman election from May 2023 to August 2024.

=== Current composition of BMA ===
Member	Position	First elected	Term ends
Paul Montgomery	Mayor	September 1, 2024	August 31, 2026
Colette George	Vice Mayor/Alderman	July 1, 2013	August 31, 2026
Betsy Cooper	Alderman	July 1, 2017	August 31, 2026
Darrel R. Duncan	Alderman	July 1, 2019	August 31, 2028
James Phillips	Alderman	July 1, 2019	August 31, 2028
Morris Baker	Alderman	September 1, 2024	August 31, 2028
Gary Mayes	Alderman	September 17, 2024 (appointed)	August 31, 2028

=== State ===
The Sullivan County portion of Kingsport is represented in the Tennessee House of Representatives by the 1st and 2nd State Representative districts and the Hawkins County portion by the 3rd district. Currently serving in these positions are Representatives John Crawford, Bud Hulsey, and Timothy Hill respectively. In the Tennessee State Senate, the Sullivan County portion of Kingsport is represented by the 4th Senatorial District and the Hawkins County portion by the 8th district. State Senator Bobby Harshbarger and State Senator Frank Niceley currently serve in these positions. All of these elected officials are members of the Republican Party.

=== Federal ===
Kingsport is represented in the United States House of Representatives by Republican Diana Harshbarger of the 1st congressional district.

== Education ==
=== Colleges and universities ===
While no college or university has its main campus within the city, these institutions have branch campuses in Kingsport:

- East Tennessee State University
- Lincoln Memorial University
- Northeast State Community College
- Tennessee College of Applied Technology (TCAT) Elizabethton

Lincoln Memorial and Northeast State are located in the Kingsport Academic Village complex in downtown Kingsport. East Tennessee State offers general education courses in the Hawkins County (westernmost) portion of the city, with more advanced courses at the Academic Village.

=== Primary and secondary ===
Almost all residents of Kingsport are served by the Kingsport City Schools public school system. It operates eight elementary schools, two middle schools, and one high school. In addition, Kingsport has eight private academies, most with religious affiliation.

All but a few parts in Sullivan County are in that district, with isolated areas in the Sullivan County School District. The portions in Hawkins County are entirely in Kingsport City Schools.

==== List of Kingsport city schools ====
- John Adams Elementary School
- Andrew Jackson Elementary School
- Andrew Johnson Elementary School
- John F. Kennedy Elementary School
- Abraham Lincoln Elementary School
- Theodore Roosevelt Elementary School
- Thomas Jefferson Elementary School
- George Washington Elementary School
- Ross N. Robinson Middle School
- John Sevier Middle School
- Dobyns-Bennett High School
- Cora Cox Academy (formerly New Horizons Alternative School)
- Dobyns-Bennett Excel

==== Former school for African Americans ====
Douglass High School in Kingsport was one of the largest African American high schools in the region when it closed for desegregation in 1966. The school's former building on East Walnut Avenue (now East Sevier Avenue) was a historic Rosenwald School, built in 1929–30 with a combination of funds from the city, private citizens and the Rosenwald Fund. Although during the years of segregation the Douglass Tigers football team was not allowed to play white teams, the Tigers won a Tennessee state football championship a state basketball championship in 1946, and a state basketball championship in 1948. The present building, built in 1951 at 301 Louis Street, is now the V.O. Dobbins Sr. Complex, named for Douglass' former principal.

== Media ==
=== Newspapers ===
- Kingsport Times-News
- Daily News (defunct)

=== Television ===
Kingsport shares a television market with Johnson City and Bristol, Virginia.

- WETP-TV 2 (PBS) in Sneedville
- WCYB-TV 5 (NBC with The CW on DT2 and Fox on DT3) in Bristol
- WJHL-TV 11 (CBS with ABC on DT2) in Johnson City
- WKPT-TV 19 (Cozi TV)
- WAPK-CD 36 (MeTV)
- WEMT-TV 39 (Roar) in Greeneville
- WLFG 68 (Religious Independent) in Grundy, Virginia

=== AM radio ===
- WKPT
- WHGG

=== FM radio ===
- WTFM
- WRZK
- WCQR
- WKOS
- WCSK

== Infrastructure ==
=== Transportation ===
==== Public transit ====
Kingsport has been serviced by the Kingsport Area Transit Service, also known as KATS, since 1995. KATS operates 4 bus routes throughout Kingsport.

==== Air ====
Kingsport is serviced by the Tri-Cities Regional Airport (IATA Code TRI)

=== Medical ===
Two hospitals operated by Ballad Health are located in Kingsport: Holston Valley Medical Center, and Indian Path Community Hospital.

=== Police ===
Kingsport Police Department is the municipal law enforcement agency for the City of Kingsport. As of 2022, the KPD has 119 sworn Officer positions, 9 Corrections Officers, 22 Telecommunicators, and 11 civilian positions variously assigned.

== Notable people ==
- Lisa Alther, author, born and grew up in Kingsport
- Edward L. Ayers, National Humanities Medal and Bancroft Prize-winning historian and ninth president of the University of Richmond, raised in Kingsport
- Barry Bales, Grammy Award-winning musician with Alison Krauss and Union Station
- James F. Barker, president of Clemson University (1999–2013)
- Nick Castle, actor who played Michael Myers in the 1978 film, Halloween, was born in Kingsport and makes appearances at the local haunted houses
- Jeff Chapman-Crane, Appalachian artist
- Harry Coover, inventor of Super Glue
- Denny Crawford, professional football player
- Amy Dalley, country music artist
- Bobby Dodd, College Football Hall of Fame inductee as both a football player (University of Tennessee) and coach (Georgia Institute of Technology)
- Bobby Eaton, professional wrestler
- Elle and Blair Fowler, online beauty retailers who spent part of their childhoods in Kingsport
- Diana Harshbarger, U.S. representative for Tennessee
- Daniel Kilgore, professional football player, Kansas City Chiefs
- Cliff Kresge, Nationwide Tour golfer who splits his time between homes in Kingsport and Florida
- Mark H. Landes, U.S. Army major general
- Hal Lawton, President & CEO of Tractor Supply, graduate of Sullivan South High School
- Blake Leeper, Paralympic silver medallist
- Cripple Clarence Lofton, boogie-woogie pianist and singer, born in Kingsport
- Matt Mahaffey, musician, frontman of pop/rock band Self
- Brownie and Stick McGhee, brothers and blues musicians, grew up in Kingsport and other East Tennessee towns
- Ken Mellons, country music artist
- John Palmer, former NBC News correspondent, born in Kingsport and a graduate of Dobyns-Bennett High School
- Jimmy Quillen, member of the U.S. House of Representatives from Tennessee's 1st congressional district (1963–1997)
- John Shelton Reed, sociologist and essayist, author or editor of eighteen books, most of them dealing with the contemporary American South
- Selwa Showker "Lucky" Roosevelt, Chief of Protocol of the United States from 1982 to 1989 and former journalist for the Washington Post, married Archibald B. Roosevelt, grandson of President Theodore Roosevelt
- Coty Sensabaugh, cornerback for the Pittsburgh Steelers
- Gerald Sensabaugh, retired NFL cornerback, played for the Jacksonville Jaguars and the Dallas Cowboys
- LeRoy Sprankle, high school multi-sport coach, author, and general manager of the Canton Independents
- Adam Steffey, bluegrass artist
- Bill Streever, biologist and author
- Cyrus Thomas, entomologist and ethnologist
- Steven Williams, actor who starred in 21 Jump Street and The Blues Brothers

== See also ==
- Netherland Inn
- Old Kingsport Presbyterian Church
