= List of census-designated places in Tennessee =

Map of the United States with Tennessee highlighted

This article lists census-designated places (CDPs) in the U.S. state of Tennessee. As of 2020, there were a total of 160 census-designated places in Tennessee.

== Census-designated places ==
County seat

CDP	Population	County
Andersonville	508	Anderson
Apison	4,428	Hamilton
Banner Hill	1,426	Unicoi
Beech Bluff	379	Madison
Belvidere	96	Franklin
Bethpage	313	Sumner
Big Rock	291	Stewart
Biltmore	1,837	Carter
Blanche	310	Lincoln
Bloomingdale	8,918	Sullivan
Blountville	3,120	Sullivan
Bogota	89	Dyer
Bon Air	430	White
Bon Aqua Junction	1,279	Hickman
Bowman	297	Cumberland
Bransford	166	Sumner
Briceville	334	Anderson
Buchanan	71	Henry
Butler	297	Johnson
Castalian Springs	608	Sumner
Central	2,114	Carter
Chesterfield	543	Henderson
Chewalla	94	McNairy
Childers Hill	100	Hardin
Christiana	4,305	Rutherford
Clarkrange	596	Fentress
Coalfield	2,361	Morgan
Coker Creek	150	Monroe
Colonial Heights	3,055	Sullivan
Conasauga	95	Polk
Cottontown	397	Sumner
Cosby	807	Cocke
Counce	316	Hardin
Dancyville	85	Haywood
Darden	364	Henderson
Delano	777	Polk
Dellrose	73	Lincoln
Dodson Branch	1,160	Jackson
Dukedom	103	Weakley
Eagleton Village	5,393	Blount
East Cleveland	1,725	Bradley
Elgin	297	Scott
Embreeville	429	Washington
Essary Springs	147	Hardeman
Eva	239	Benton
Fairfield	141	Sumner
Fairfield Glade	9,152	Cumberland
Fairgarden	481	Sevier
Fairmount	2,193	Hamilton
Fall Branch	1,248	Greene and Washington
Falling Water	1,873	Hamilton
Farner	267	Polk
Fincastle	1,611	Campbell
Finley	774	Dyer
Flat Top Mountain	561	Hamilton
Flintville	722	Lincoln
Fowlkes	882	Dyer
Frankewing	124	Giles
Gladeville	1,189	Wilson
Graball	228	Sumner
Gray	1,293	Washington
Green Hill	6,518	Wilson
Greenvale	79	Wilson
Griffith Creek	465	Marion
Grimsley	1,219	Fentress
Halls	2,091	Lauderdale
Hampton	2,030	Carter
Harrison	7,902	Hamilton
Helenwood	635	Scott
Hickman	224	Smith
Hilham	338	Overton
Hillsboro	433	Coffee
Holladay	95	Benton
Hopewell	2,087	Bradley
Hunter	1,803	Carter
Huron	58	Henderson
Iron City	274	Lawrence and Wayne
Jacks Creek	81	Chester
John Sevier	1,026	Knox
Kahite	834	Monroe
Karns	3,536	Knox
Lake Tansi	4,629	Cumberland
Lakewood Park	1,161	Coffee
Lavinia	81	Carroll
Lenox	308	Dyer
Leoma	464	Lawrence
Lone Oak	1,198	Sequatchie
Luray	197	Henderson
Lyles	763	Hickman
Maryland	472	Cumberland
Mascot	2,760	Knox
McDonald	586	Bradley
Mercer	150	Madison
Middle Valley	11,695	Hamilton
Midtown	1,220	Roane
Miston	77	Dyer
Mooresburg	877	Hawkins
Morris Chapel	238	Hardin
Mowbray Mountain	1,705	Hamilton
New Deal	398	Sumner
New Union	1,646	Coffee
Nixon	514	Hardin
Norene	148	Wilson
Oak Grove	238	Sumner
Oak Grove	4,482	Washington
Ocoee	201	Polk
Olivet	1,441	Hardin
Ooltewah	684	Hamilton
Orebank	929	Sullivan
Palmersville	162	Weakley
Park City	2,442	Lincoln
Pelham	371	Grundy
Petros	459	Morgan
Pine Crest	2,439	Carter
Pinson	464	Madison
Pocahontas	176	Hardeman
Powell	13,802	Knox
Prospect	121	Giles
Randolph	258	Tipton
Rarity Bay	995	Loudon and Monroe
Riceville	600	McMinn
Roan Mountain	1,078	Carter
Robbins	254	Scott
Rockvale	1,279	Rutherford
Rural Hill	2,047	Wilson
Russellville	822	Hamblen
Sale Creek	3,021	Hamilton
Sequatchie	622	Marion
Sewanee	2,535	Franklin
Seymour	14,705	Blount and Sevier
Shackle Island	3,331	Sumner
Sherwood	122	Franklin
Shiloh	163	Hardin
South Cleveland	7,673	Bradley
Spurgeon	3,978	Sullivan and Washington
Statesville	82	Wilson
Strawberry Plains	2,405	Jefferson, Knox, and Sevier
Sullivan Gardens	1,271	Sullivan
Summertown	856	Lawrence, Lewis, and Maury
Taft	256	Lincoln
Telford	909	Washington
Tellico Village	7,311	Loudon
Tuckers Crossroads	263	Wilson
Unionville	1,394	Bedford
Valley Forge	1,926	Carter
Walland	281	Blount
Walnut Grove	359	Hardin
Walnut Grove	911	Sumner
Walnut Hill	2,331	Sullivan
Walterhill	407	Rutherford
Westpoint	164	Lawrence
Whiteside	274	Marion
Whitlock	95	Henry
Wildersville	161	Henderson
Wildwood	1,157	Blount
Wildwood Lake	3,286	Bradley
Wrigley	257	Hickman
Wynnburg	91	Lake
Yuma	103	Carroll

== See also ==
- List of municipalities in Tennessee
- List of counties in Tennessee
