= Tennessee State Route 36 =

State highway in Tennessee, United States

State Route 36
- SR 36 mainline in red

Route information
- Maintained by TDOT
- Length: 28.6 mi (46.0 km)
- Existed: October 1, 1923–present

Southern segment
- Length: 7.6 mi (12.2 km)
- South end: US 19W at the NC state line
- North end: I-26 / US 19W / US 23 in Temple Hill

Northern segment
- Length: 21.0 mi (33.8 km)
- South end: US 11E / US 19W in Johnson City
- North end: US 23 / SR 137 / SR 346 in Kingsport

Location
- Country: United States
- State: Tennessee
- Counties: Unicoi, Washington, Sullivan

Highway system
- Tennessee State Routes; Interstate; US; State
← SR 35	→ SR 37

State Route 36 (SR 36) is a 28.6-mile-long (46.0 km) state highway, broken into two segments. In Unicoi County, it serves as the hidden concurrency of U.S. Route 19W (US 19W); in Washington and Sullivan counties, it serves as a stand-alone secondary road connecting the cities of Johnson City and Kingsport.

== Route description ==
=== Segment 1 ===
SR 36 begins in Unicoi County as the unsigned companion route of US 19W at the Tennessee-North Carolina state line in the Bald Mountains at Spivey Gap. US 19W/SR 36 goes west as a narrow two-lane highway through rural mountainous areas before curving to the north and having a y-intersection with SR 352 (Old US 23). The highway winds its way north to Temple Hill, where they have an interchange with I-26/US 23 (Exit 43). Here, US 19W becomes concurrent with I-26/US 23 while SR 36 comes to an end.

=== Segment 2 ===
==== Washington County ====
SR 36 begins in Washington County in Johnson City at a y-intersection with US 11E/US 19W/SR 34. SR 36 then heads northwest as an undivided 4-lane highway and has an interchange with SR 381 before leaving Johnson City and continuing northwest. It passes through Boones Creek, where it has an intersection with SR 354, before passing through Oak Grove and Spurgeon, where it has an intersection with SR 75 which provides access to Gray to southwest and the Tri-Cities Regional Airport and Blountville in the northeast. SR 36 then narrows to 2-lanes before crossing into Sullivan County.

==== Sullivan County ====
SR 36 then continues northeast, paralleling the South Fork Holston River to Colonial Heights, where it has an interchange with Interstate 81 (exit 59). SR 36 then widens to four lanes again and enters Kingsport and has an interchange with SR 93. SR 36 then passes through a major business district, where it becomes concurrent with SR 126, before passing through several neighborhoods and curving to the west. SR 126 then splits off just west of downtown before SR 36 passes straight through downtown Kingsport. SR 36 then has an intersection with SR 355, where the highway turns north again and has an interchange with US 11W/SR 1. SR 36 then continues north through several neighborhoods before coming to an end at an intersection with SR 346 at the interchange with US 23/SR 137, less than one mile (1.6 km) from the Tennessee-Virginia state line.

== History ==
US 23 was established on October 1, 1923, with a complete concurrency with SR 36, from the North Carolina state line to the Virginia state line; going through Erwin, Unicoi, Johnson City, and Kingsport. Around 1928, the route was extended to the Virginia state line, replacing SR 68, which was reassigned to a different route. On June 8, 1951, US 23 was rerouted southwest of Ernestville, along SR 81 through Flag Pond and Sam's Gap into North Carolina; its old alignment remained part of US 19W/SR 36.

In 1970, the first segment of a four-lane freeway, designated SR 137, was opened between Johnson City and Kingsport. Over the following decade, SR 137 continued being extended at both ends until in 1982, when AASHTO approved US 23 relocation onto the freeway, leaving behind its old alignment to SR 36 from north of Johnson City to near the Virginia state line. In December 1985, I-181 was established, truncated SR 137 north of US 11W, while SR 36 replaced as new concurrency south of US 11E; all signs and exit numbers were based on US 23 designation. In 1988, AASHTO approved an extension of I-26 from North Carolina to I-81, on contingent upon the completion and certification of interstate standards in North Carolina, which happened in August 2003. Following the new designation, both SR 36 and SR 81 was removed of their concurrencies with US 23. In March 2007, the remaining spur of I-181, from I-81 to US 11W, was switched to I-26.

== Major intersections ==
County	Location	mi	km	Destinations	Notes
Unicoi		0.0	0.0	US 19W south – Cane River	North Carolina state line; southern terminus; southern end of US 19W concurrency
Unicoi	Temple Hill	6.3	10.1	SR 352 west (Old Asheville Highway) – Flag Pond	Eastern terminus of SR 352; former US 23
Unicoi	Temple Hill	7.6	12.2	I-26 / US 23 / US 19W north – Asheville, Johnson City	I-26/US 23 exit 43; northern terminus; US 19W continues north along I-26 east/US 23 north
Gap in route
Washington	Johnson City	0.0	0.0	US 11E south / US 19W south (N Roan Street/SR 34) – Downtown	Southern terminus; No access from southbound SR 36 to northbound 11E/19W.
Washington	Johnson City	0.4	0.64	SR 381 (State of Franklin Road) to US 11E north / US 19W north	Interchange; US-11E/19W are only signed on southbound SR 36
Washington	Boones Creek	2.9	4.7	SR 354 south (Boones Creek Road) to I-26 – Jonesborough	Northern terminus of SR 354
Washington	Spurgeon	7	11	SR 75 (Airport Road) to I-26 – Gray, Blountville	Provides access to Tri-Cities Regional Airport
Sullivan	Colonial Heights	11	18	I-81 – Knoxville, Bristol	I-81 exit 59
Sullivan	Kingsport	14	23	SR 93 (N John B Dennis Highway) to I-26 – Bristol, Greeneville	Interchange
Sullivan	Kingsport	15	24	SR 126 east (Memorial Boulevard) – Blountville	Southern end of SR 126 concurrency
Sullivan	Kingsport	16	26	SR 126 west (N Wilcox Drive) to I-26	Northern end of SR 126 concurrency
Sullivan	Kingsport	17.8	28.6	SR 355 south (W Center Street)	Northern terminus of SR 355
Sullivan	Kingsport	18.3	29.5	US 11W (W Stone Drive/SR 1) – Mount Carmel, Bristol	Interchange
Sullivan	Kingsport	21.1	34.0	SR 346 west (Carters Valley Road) – Church Hill US 23 (SR 137) to I-26 – Johnson City, Weber City, VA, Gate City, VA	Northern terminus; interchange; eastern terminus of SR 346
1.000 mi = 1.609 km; 1.000 km = 0.621 mi: Concurrency terminus
