= WHGG =

Coordinates: 36°27′40″N 82°27′12″W

- Kingsport, Tennessee; United States
- Broadcast area: Tri-Cities, VA/TN
- Frequency: 1090 kHz
- Branding: Love Radio FM

Programming
- Format: Contemporary Christian

Ownership
- Owner: Kenneth Clyde Hill
- Sister stations: WABN, WETB, WPWT

History
- First air date: 1967

Technical information
- Licensing authority: FCC
- Facility ID: 64508
- Class: D
- Power: 10,000 watts day 1,800 watts critical hours
- Translators: 97.3 W247CH (Kingsport); 100.3 W262CG (Spurgeon)

Links
- Public license information: Public file; LMS
- Webcast: Listen Live
- Website: loveradio.fm

WHGG (1090 AM) is a Contemporary Christian formatted broadcast radio station licensed to Kingsport, Tennessee, serving the Tri-Cities, VA/TN area.

== History ==
This station signed on the air in 1967 with call letters WGOC and a modern-Nashville-country music format. The original owner was insurance mogul J.T. Parker, and the first station manager was Phil Roberts, who was hired away from crosstown station WKIN where he had been a popular morning host.

The first song played on the air on the morning of sign-on was I Washed My Face In The Morning Dew by Tom T. Hall. The 45-RPM disc hung on the wall of the station's original lobby on West Center Street in Kingsport until the studios were moved elsewhere in the 1980s.

The original power was 1,000 watts and the station originally operated sunrise-to-sunset, with 6am-to-sunrise power of 7.85 watts. The original transmitter location, which was abandoned in the 1970s, was at the intersection of West Stone Drive and Granby Road in western Kingsport.

== Management ==
WHGG shares the same management as sister stations WHCB and WPWT.
