= SSW Heavyweight Championship =

Professional wrestling championship

Details
- Promotion: Southern States Wrestling
- Date established: October 1, 1990
- Current champion: Daniel Richards
- Date won: November 3, 2018
Statistics
- First champion: Tennessee Equalizer
- Most reigns: Beau James (8 reigns)
- Longest reign: Daniel Richards ( 2,599+ days)
- Shortest reign: Buddy Landel (<1 day)

The Southern States Wrestling (SSW) Heavyweight Championship is the primary professional wrestling championship in Southern States Wrestling. It was first won by The Tennessee Equalizer when he defeated George Hiatt in Elizabethton, Tennessee on February 16, 1991. The title is generally defended in the Southern United States, most often in its home base in East Tennessee, but also as far away as Virginia and West Virginia. In August 2004, then champion Ray Idol began wrestling for rival promotion NWA Championship Wrestling. Although he was immediately stripped of the title, Idol continued defending a different NWA Championship Wrestling-version under the SSW name. However, this was short-lived and the title became a regular title within the main promotion. There are 41 recognized champions with a total of 69 title reigns and 8 vacancies. Wayne Adkins is the current Champion in his second reign. He won the title off of Lord Murphy Costigan at a house show in Kingsport.

Key
No.	Overall reign number
Reign	Reign number for the specific champion
Days	Number of days held
<1	Reign lasted less than a day
+	Current reign is changing daily

No.	Champion	Championship change			Reign statistics		Notes	Ref.
No.	Champion	Date	Event	Location	Reign	Days	Notes	Ref.
1	Tennessee Equalizer	February 16, 1991	House show	Elizabethton, Tennessee	1	146	Defeated George Hiatt to become the inaugural champion.	
2	Skyfire	July 12, 1991	House show	Kingsport, Tennessee	1	111		
3	Stan Lee	October 31, 1991	House show	Kingsport, Tennessee	1	250		
4	Wayne Rogers	July 7, 1992	House show	Fall Branch, Tennessee	1	185		
5	G.Q. Stratus	January 8, 1993	House show	Fall Branch, Tennessee	1	196		
6	Jimmy Golden	March 30, 1993	House show	Weber City, Virginia	1	115		
7	Wayne Rogers	July 23, 1993	House show	Fall Branch, Tennessee	2	218		
8	Mike Samson	February 26, 1994	House show	Morristown, Tennessee	1	69		
9	The Mongolian Stomper	May 6, 1994	SSW	Fall Branch, Tennessee	1	186-216	This reign's length is uncertain.	
—	Vacated	September 1994	—	—	—	—	The Mongolian Stomper vacated the title somewhere in September after he announced his retirement from professional wrestling due to a legitimate injury. Therefore, his reign's exact length is uncertain.	
10	Chic White	October 1, 1994	SSW	Fall Branch, Tennessee	1	97	Defeated Danny Christian to win the vacant title.	
11	Steve Flynn	January 6, 1995	SSW	Fall Branch, Tennessee	1	75		
12	Mike Samson	March 21, 1995	SSW	Fall Branch, Tennessee	2	143		
13	Steve Flynn	August 11, 1995	SSW	Fall Branch, Tennessee	2	57		
14	Iron Man	October 7, 1995	SSW	Fall Branch, Tennessee	1	104		
15	Eddie Bruiser	January 19, 1996	SSW	Fall Branch, Tennessee	1	42	Defeated Iron Man by forfeit due to Iron Man not showing up to the defense.	
16	Tennessee Equalizer	March 1, 1996	SSW	Fall Branch, Tennessee	2	227		
17	Danny Christian	September 2, 1996	SSW	Fall Branch, Tennessee	1	33		
18	K. C. Thunder	October 5, 1996	SSW	Fall Branch, Tennessee	1	118		
19	Dan Cooley	January 31, 1997	House show	Shawsville, Virginia	1	68		
—	Vacated	April 9, 1997	—	—	—	—	Title was declared vacated after Dan Cooley was stripped out of it due to unknown circumstances.	
20	Steve Flynn	May 2, 1997	House show	Fall Branch, Tennessee	3	122	Defeated Frank Parker in a tournament final to win the vacant title.	
—	Vacated	September 1, 1997	—	—	—	—	Steve Flynn was stripped of the championship after he failed to appear for a scheduled title defense. The title was subsequently vacated.	
21	Johnny Thunder	September 1, 1997	House show	Fall Branch, Tennessee	1	54	This was a tag team match in which Thunder pinned Otto Schwanz to win the vacant title.	
22	The War Machine	October 25, 1997	House show	Fall Branch, Tennessee	1	49	This was a four corners match also involving Johnny Thunder, Steve Flynn and Ricky Harrison.	
23	Ricky Harrison	December 13, 1997	SSW	Mountain City, Tennessee	1	118		
24	Buddy Landel	April 10, 1998	SSW	Fall Branch, Tennessee	1	<1		
25	Beau James	April 10, 1998	SSW	Fall Branch, Tennessee	1	7		
26	Ricky Harrison	April 17, 1998	SSW	Fall Branch, Tennessee	2	274	This was a loser leaves the company match.	
27	Beau James	January 16, 1999	SSW	Kingsport, Tennessee	2	140		
28	Iron Cross	June 5, 1999	House show	Kingsport, Tennessee	1	124		
29	The War Machine	October 7, 1999	House show	Johnson City, Tennessee	2	148		
30	Tracy Smothers	March 3, 2000	House show	Saltville, Virginia	1	190		
31	Iron Cross	September 9, 2000	House show	Kingsport, Tennessee	2	128		
32	Stan Sierra	January 15, 2001	House show	Kingsport, Tennessee	1	11		
33	Brian Overbay	January 26, 2001	House show	Kingsport, Tennessee	1	<1	Won the title by forfeit.	
34	Steve Phillips	January 26, 2001	House show	Kingsport, Tennessee	1	15		
35	Brian Overbay	February 10, 2001	House show	Kingsport, Tennessee	2	111	Overbay was awarded the title via referee's reverse decision.	
36	Ricky Harrison	June 1, 2001	SSW	Kingsport, Tennessee	3	207		
37	Beau James	December 25, 2001	House show	Kingsport, Tennessee	3	186-217	The exact length of this reign is uncertain.	
38	Heinrich Von Keller	July 2002	House show	Kingsport, Tennessee	1	31-62	The exact length of this reign is uncertain.	
—	Vacated	September 1, 2002	—	—	—	—	The title was declared vacated after Von Keller was stripped of it due to attacking a local television sponsor.	
39	Jesse Taylor	October 15, 2002	SSW	Kingsport, Tennessee	1	71	Defeated Beau James in tournament final to win the vacant title.	
40	Scotty McKeever	December 25, 2002	House show	Kingsport, Tennessee	1	47-75	The exact length of this reign is uncertain.	
41	Jesse Taylor	February 2003	House show	Beaver, West Virginia	2	70-98	The exact length of this reign is uncertain.	
42	Robbie Cassidy	May 9, 2003	House show	Greeneville, Tennessee	1	59		
43	Jesse Taylor	July 7, 2003	House show	Kingsport, Tennessee	3	59		
44	Brad Batten	September 4, 2003	House show	Kingsport, Tennessee	1	26-57	The exact length of this reign is uncertain.	
45	Beau James	October 2003	House show	Kingsport, Tennessee	4	0-92	James was awarded the title via forfeit. The exact length of this reign is uncertain.	
46	Ray Idol	January 2004	House show	Kingsport, Tennessee	1	0-220	The exact length of this reign is uncertain.	
47	John Noble	August 7, 2004	House show	Kingsport, Tennessee	1	57	Noble was awarded the title after Idol left for rival promotion, NWA Championship Wrestling. Idol's stripping was not recognized as a vacancy but as an official title change without a proper match taking place.	
48	Beau James	October 3, 2004	House show	Kingsport, Tennessee	5	173		
49	Danny Ray	March 25, 2005	Event held at the National Guard Armory	Kingsport, Tennessee	1	N/A	The exact length of this reign is uncertain.	
—	Vacated	2005	—	—	—	—	The title was vacated somewhere in 2005 due to unknown circumstances.	
50	Wayne Adkins	September 27, 2008	SSW	Kingsport, Tennessee	1	61	Defeated Ryan Dookie in a tournament final to win the vacant title.	
51	K. C. Thunder	November 27, 2008	SSW	Kingsport, Tennessee	2	43		
—	Vacated	January 9, 2009	—	—	—	—	The title was vacated somewhere in 2005 due to unknown circumstances.	
52	Cody Ices	January 9, 2009	SSW New Year's Bash	Kingsport, Tennessee	1	283	This was a 15-man rumble match for the vacant title.	
53	Ray Idol	October 19, 2009	SSW	Kingsport, Tennessee	2	130		
54	Frank Parker	February 26, 2010	SSW 19th Anniversary	Kingsport, Tennessee	1	94-124	The exact length of this reign is uncertain.	
55	Ray Idol	June 2010	House show	Kingsport, Tennessee	3	148-178	The exact length of this reign is uncertain.	
56	Frank Parker	November 25, 2010	SSW 19th Annual Thanksgiving Night Extravaganza	Kingsport, Tennessee	2	234	Cagematch.net says this match was also for the SSW Young Guns Championship which was held by Beau James at the moment. However, the site recognizes Ray Idol as the Heavyweight champion instead of Beau James, not specifying a match where Parker took the title from James. Yet this title change appears to be real but no other evidence for this has been recorded.	
57	Ray Idol	July 17, 2011	House show	Mt. Carmel, Tennessee	4	140		
58	Frank Parker	November 24, 2011	House show	Mt. Carmel, Tennessee	3	234		
59	Beau James	July 15, 2012	House show	Mt. Carmel, Tennessee	6	76		
60	Eric Darkstorm	September 29, 2012	House show	Mt. Carmel, Tennessee	1	400		
61	Kyle Matthews	November 3, 2013	House show	Mt. Carmel, Tennessee	1	26		
62	Eric Darkstorm	November 29, 2013	House show	Mt. Carmel, Tennessee	2	140		
63	Kyle Kool	April 18, 2014	House show	Rogersville, Tennessee	1	162		
64	DeAndre Jackson	September 27, 2014	SSW	Kingsport, Tennessee	1	620		
—	Vacated	June 8, 2016	—	—	—	—		
65	Iron Cross	July 9, 2016	House show	Gray, Tennessee	3	N/A	The exact length of this reign is uncertain.	
66	Krunch The Equalizer	2017	House show	Gray, Tennessee	1	0-189	The exact length of this reign is uncertain.	
67	Beau James	July 8, 2017	House show	Gray, Tennessee	7	176-281	The exact length of this reign is uncertain.	
—		2018	—	—			Cagematch.net shows an unknown status of the title from the beginning of 2018 until October but doesn't say if it is a vacancy or the continuation of James' reign.	
68	Beau James	October 8, 2018	House show	Gray, Tennessee	8	26		
69	Daniel Richards	November 3, 2018	SSW	Gray, Tennessee	1	2,599+		

== Combined reigns ==
†	Indicates the current champion
¤	The exact length of at least one title reign is uncertain, so the shortest length is considered.

Rank	Wrestler	No. of reigns	Combined days
1	Beau James	8	784-1,012¤
2	Daniel Richards †	1	2,599+
3	Eric Darkstorm	2	640
4	DeAndre Jackson	1	620
5	Ricky Harrison	3	599
6	Frank Parker	3	562-592
7	Ray Idol	4	418-668¤
8	Wayne Rogers	2	403
9	Tennessee Equalizer/Krunch The Equalizer	3	373-562¤
10	Cody Ices	1	283
11	Steve Flynn	3	254
12	Iron Cross	3	252¤
13	Stan Lee	1	250
14	Mike Samson	2	212
15	Jesse Taylor	3	200-228¤
16	The War Machine	2	197
17	G.Q. Stratus	1	196
18	Tracy Smothers	1	190
19	The Mongolian Stomper	1	186-216¤
20	Kyle Kool	1	162
21	K. C. Thunder	2	121
22	Jimmy Golden	1	119
23	Brian Overbay	2	111
23	Skyfire	1	111
25	Iron Man	1	104
26	Chic White	1	97
27	Dan Cooley	1	68
28	Wayne Adkins	1	61
29	Robbie Cassidy	1	59
30	John Noble	1	57
31	Johnny Thunder	1	54
32	Scotty McKeever	1	47-75¤
33	Eddie Bruiser	1	42
34	Danny Christian	1	33
35	Heinrich Von Keller	1	31-62¤
36	Brad Batten	1	26-57¤
37	Kyle Matthews	1	26
38	Steve Phillips	1	15
39	Stan Sierra	1	11
40	Buddy Landel	1	<1
41	Danny Ray	1	N/A¤
