= WETB =

Coordinates: 36°19′43″N 82°24′39″W

- Johnson City, Tennessee; United States
- Frequency: 790 kHz
- Branding: 93.7 Goat FM

Programming
- Format: Classic hits
- Affiliations: Compass Media Networks

Ownership
- Owner: Kenneth C. Hill
- Sister stations: WABN, WHGG, WPWT

History
- First air date: November 25, 1947
- Call sign meaning: East Tennessee Broadcasting, name of the founding company

Technical information
- Licensing authority: FCC
- Facility ID: 44050
- Class: D
- Power: 5,000 watts (day); 72 watts (night)
- Translator: 93.7 W229DH (Johnson City)

Links
- Public license information: Public file; LMS
- Webcast: Listen live
- Website: mygoatfm.com

WETB (790 AM) is a commercial radio station broadcasting a classic hits format as 93.7 Goat FM. It is licensed to Johnson City, Tennessee, and serves the Tri-Cities area. It is owned by Kenneth C. Hill with studios on Brandonwood Drive in Johnson City.

By day, WETB is powered at 5,000 watts non-directional. But at night, to prevent interference to other stations on 790 AM, it must greatly reduce power to 72 watts. For most of WETB's early history, it was a daytimer, required to go off the air at night. The transmitter is on Brandonwood Drive, near the station's studios. Programming is also heard on 250-watt FM translator W229DH at 93.7 MHz.

== History ==
WETB signed on the air on November 25, 1947. In the 1960s and 1970s, it was a popular Top 40 station.

In the late 80s, WETB was "East Tennessee's Beautiful 79". It played a mix of middle of the road (MOR) hits and easy listening music.

Former logo

For most of the early 2000s, it aired a Christian radio format.
