= WCQR-FM =

- Kingsport, Tennessee; United States
- Broadcast area: Tri-Cities, Tennessee-Virginia
- Frequency: 88.3 MHz

Programming
- Format: Christian Adult Contemporary

Ownership
- Owner: Positive Alternative Radio, Inc.
- Sister stations: WEYE

History
- First air date: 1997
- Former call signs: WPGB (1990–1995)
- Call sign meaning: We're Christian Quality Radio

Technical information
- Licensing authority: FCC
- Facility ID: 53101
- Class: C2
- ERP: 1,200 watts
- HAAT: 650 meters
- Transmitter coordinates: 36°25′53″N 82°08′16″W
- Translators: 93.7 W229BA (Greeneville); 96.1 W241AL (Marion, Virginia); 101.9 W270BN (Walnut Hill); 104.7 W284BB (Wise, Virginia)
- Repeater: 104.3 WEYE (Surgoinsville)

Links
- Public license information: Public file; LMS
- Webcast: Listen Live
- Website: wcqr.org

WCQR-FM (88.3 MHz) is a radio station broadcasting a Christian Adult Contemporary music format. Licensed to Kingsport, Tennessee, United States, it serves the Tri-Cities area. Locally owned by Positive Alternative Radio, Inc., it has been on the air since 1997.

The station was assigned the WCQR-FM call letters by the Federal Communications Commission on December 8, 1995.

WCQR-FM's transmitter is located in the Cherokee National Forest, almost 4,200 feet above sea level. As a result, despite its modest 1,200-watt power, it provides strong grade B coverage as far as Boone, North Carolina.
