= WPWT =

Coordinates: 36°27′40″N 82°27′12″W

- Colonial Heights, Tennessee; United States
- Broadcast area: Tri-Cities
- Frequency: 870 kHz
- Branding: 96.3 The Possum

Programming
- Language: English
- Format: Classic country

Ownership
- Owner: Kenneth Clyde Hill; (Information Communications Corporation)
- Sister stations: WABN; WHCB; WHGG

History
- First air date: December 31, 1984
- Former call signs: WPRQ (1984–1991); WFKB (1991–1992); WZMC (1992–1996)
- Call sign meaning: Power Talk (former format)

Technical information
- Licensing authority: FCC
- Facility ID: 42652
- Class: D
- Power: 10,000 watts (daytime only)
- Translators: 96.3 W242CQ (Colonial Heights); 100.7 W264BY (Kingsport)

Links
- Public license information: Public file; LMS
- Webcast: Listen live
- Website: www.963thepossum.com

WPWT (870 kHz) is a AM radio classic country music formatted broadcast radio station licensed to Colonial Heights, Tennessee, serving the Tri-Cities area. WPWT is owned and operated by Kenneth Clyde Hill.

== History ==
This station signed on the air on December 31, 1984. Prior to its sign-on, it had been assigned the call letters WIKV by the FCC. Since these calls were deemed by constructing supervisor Dave Murray (husband of Martha Murray, the original licensee) to be too close to the calls of a prominent FM in the market, WIKQ, the calls were changed, to WPRQ. All this transpired before the station ever officially hit the air.

The original power was 5,000 watts. This was increased later to 10,000 watts. The signal, which shares the clear channel of 870 kHz with Class-A 50,000-watt WWL in New Orleans, was licensed as daytime-only, which it remains today.

The original format was contemporary Christian hit music. Other formats have followed, including news/talk and religious talk. In the late 1980s/early 1990s, the station was dark (silent) for a time, but was sold and returned to the air. Its current owner, Kenneth Clyde Hill, owns other stations as well.

The transmitter was originally a single tower near Warrior's Path State Park in Colonial Heights, Tennessee, which is south of Kingsport, Tennessee. It remains there today.

The original studio was in a residence, in Colonial Heights, Tennessee, which was owned by Dave and Martha Murray.

In November 2017, WPWT rebranded as "96.3 The Possum" (simulcasting on FM translators W242CQ 96.3 Colonial Heights and W264BY 100.7 Kingsport).

== Management ==
Dr. Kenneth C. Hill is the owner of WPWT and sister stations WHCB and WHGG.
