= Tennessee State Route 354 =

State highway in Tennessee, US

State Route 354
- Boones Creek Road
- TN 354 highlighted in red

Route information
- Maintained by TDOT
- Length: 7.4 mi (11.9 km)
- Existed: July 1, 1983–present

Major junctions
- South end: US 11E / US 321 in Jonesborough
- I-26 / US 23 in Boones Creek
- North end: SR 36 in Boones Creek

Location
- Country: United States
- State: Tennessee
- Counties: Washington

Highway system
- Tennessee State Routes; Interstate; US; State
← SR 353	→ SR 355

State Route 354 (SR 354) is a state highway in Washington County, Tennessee. It connects Jonesborough with Boones Creek.

== Route description ==
SR 354 begins at an intersection with US 11E/US 321/SR 34 in Jonesborough and continues north to an intersection with I-26/US 23 in the Boones Creek neighborhood of North Johnson City and ends at an intersection with SR 36 in Boones Creek.

== Major intersections ==
The entire route is in Washington County.

Location	mi	km	Destinations	Notes
Jonesborough	0.0	0.0	US 11E / US 321 (Jackson Boulevard/SR 34) – Greeneville, Johnson City	Southern terminus
Boones Creek			I-26 / US 23 – Kingsport, Johnson City	I-26/US 23 exit 17
Boones Creek	7.4	11.9	SR 36 (North Roan Street) – Johnson City, Oak Grove	Northern terminus
1.000 mi = 1.609 km; 1.000 km = 0.621 mi

== See also ==
- List of state routes in Tennessee
