= David Crockett High School (Tennessee) =

Location
- 684 Old State Route 34; Jonesborough, Tennessee 37659; USA
- 36°15′35.4″N 82°30′9.9″W

Information
- Type: High school
- Established: c. 1971
- School district: Washington County Schools
- Principal: Dr. Ashley Davis
- Grades: 9–12
- Enrollment: 1,164 (2023–2024)
- Colors: Brown and gold
- Mascot: Pioneer
- Nickname: Pioneers
- Website: David Crockett High School

David Crockett High School is a high school located in Jonesborough, Tennessee. As of 2024, U.S. News & World Report ranks the school 75th among high schools in Tennessee. It is one of two high schools in the Washington County School System, specifically serving the southern part of the county. The other county high school is Daniel Boone High School, which serves the northern part of the county.

The school colors are brown (or "buckskin") and old gold. The school's mascot is a Pioneer.

== School content ==
David Crockett has a mixture between Vocational education CTE), Advanced Placement (AP), and Dual enrollment classes. The school has several CTE classes: Agriculture, Teaching, Welding, Electrical, Machine Shop, Business, Digital Design, Nursing, and Culinary (there may be more). There are several greenhouses on the campus. For CTE classes, there may be the option to get a Professional certification. The school has several AP classes: Human Geography, Government, US History, Language and Composition, Literature, Statistics, Pre-Calculus (Trigonometry), and Calculus. In AP, nineteen percent of the student body has taken an AP exam, with forty-two percent passing exam. For Dual Enrollment, the students take classes for East Tennessee State University and Northeast State Community College. Students can take some classes online, at the high school, or on the university for the class.

== Sport History ==
Each year, David Crockett plays Daniel Boone in football. The game referred to as the "Musket Bowl" was first played in 1971 when the two new consolidated high schools opened their doors, and David Crockett High defeated Daniel Boone High by a score of 72–0. The next week, David Crockett was ranked No. 1 in the state by Litratings, a difference-by-scores system. As of 2019, Daniel Boone leads the series with a record of 37–12, winning the latest game played 28–20 at home. The game gained popularity by being played annually in the Mini-Dome at East Tennessee State University (ETSU). Today, the Musket Bowl is held at Daniel Boone and David Crockett High Schools where each school rotates the event each year. The winning team is presented with a “musket.” If that team wins three years consecutively, they keep the musket, and a new one is purchased for the next season’s game. Daniel Boone High has accomplished this more than Crockett. It's the “Battle of Washington County…the Pioneers vs. the Trailblazers.” Between 2014 and 2015, the school participated in a local rivalry series involving Chuckey-Doak and Unicoi County high schools, referred to as "The Kings of the Nolichucky."

=== 2014 Musket Bowl Fight ===
In 2014, a fight broke out at the end of the Musket Bowl. The score was a loss for Crockett with a 23–16 score. The fight was quickly broken up by the sheriff deputies. It resulted in a three-year post season ban and fines that amounted to around $5,000.

=== 2022 Musket Bowl Skydiving Accident ===
On October 21, 2022, a fatal skydiving accident occurred at the school before a football match against Daniel Boone High School. 55-year-old Richard Sheffield was part of Jump TN, a skydiving team hired to perform a demonstration jump during the pre-game. Sheffield suffered a hard landing outside the intended landing area on the football field and was flown to a nearby hospital where he later died. As a result of the accident the football match was delayed.

Washington County Sheriff Keith Sexton concluded that there were no suspicious circumstances in the incident and that Sheffield's death was "a very unfortunate accident".
