= Jendia Gammon =

US science fiction author (born 1974)

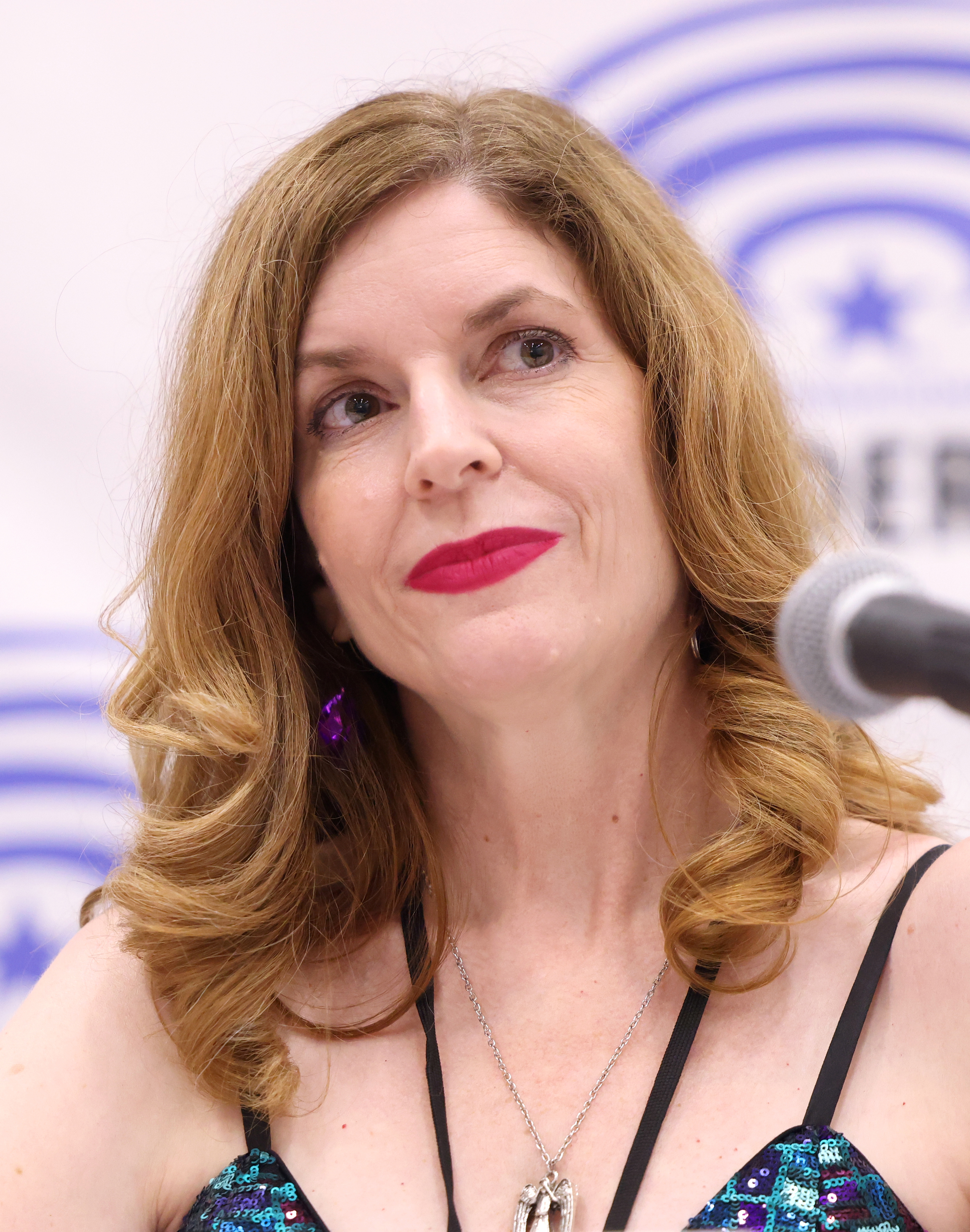
- Jendia Gammon in 2026
- Born: Jennifer Dianne Gammon; 1974 (age 51–52); Kingsport, Tennessee, US
- Occupation: Author
- Writing career
- Pen name: J. Dianne Dotson; Jendia Gammon
- Genres: Science fiction, horror

Jennifer Dianne "Jendia" Gammon (born 1974), also known by her pen name J. Dianne Dotson, is an American author of science fiction and horror. Her works include The Shadow Galaxy and The Inn at the Amethyst Lantern.

== Early life ==
Jendia Gammon was born Jennifer Dianne Gammon in Kingsport, Tennessee. She spent much of her childhood in Gray, Tennessee. There, she wrote from an early age, illustrating her own stories, and was influenced by the works of Ray Bradbury and L. Frank Baum. At the age of 10, she formed her own astronomy club with her friends, "to learn about the universe."

Gammon graduated from the University of Tennessee, Knoxville with a Bachelor of Science in Ecology and Evolutionary Biology and worked for several years as a research technologist in academic laboratories. She later worked as a freelance science writer, content marketing writer for biotech, and senior content manager. She has stated that this scientific background aided her understanding of writing science fiction.

== Career ==
Gammon self-published her space opera series The Questrison Saga under the pen name J. Dianne Dotson. The series consists of: Heliopause (2018), Ephemeris (2019), Accretion (2020), and Luminiferous (2021). In 2023, she published The Shadow Galaxy: A Collection of Short Stories and Poetry under JournalStone and Trepidatio publishing. It was longlisted for the BSFA Awards. Alan K. Dell praised the Questrison Saga as "a fantastic read", and The Fantasy Hive described The Shadow Galaxy as "a mesmerizing first collection".

Also in 2023, her YA novel, The Inn at the Amethyst Lantern, was published by Android Press. The Storygraph described The Inn at the Amethyst Lantern as: "a captivating read". This novel was a finalist for the Andre Norton Nebula Award and the BSFA Award for Best Fiction for Younger Readers.

She has also written short stories as both J. Dianne Dotson and Jendia Gammon. In 2023, she adopted the "old nickname" Jendia Gammon for all books going forward to honor her family.

== Personal life ==
Jendia Gammon lives in Los Angeles, California, with her family.

In 2024, Jendia Gammon founded her own publishing company, Stars and Sabers Publishing, and announced her intention to edit and publish a cross-genre anthology, Of Shadows, Stars, and Sabers.

== Bibliography ==
- 2018: Dianne Dotson, J. (2018). Heliopause: The Questrison Saga: Book One. J. Dianne Dotson. p. 262. ISBN 9780999408209.
- 2019: Dotson, J. Dianne (2018). Ephemeris. US. p. 330. ISBN 978-0999408247.
- 2020: Dotson, J. Dianne (2020). Accretion. US: J. Dianne Dotson. p. 258. ISBN 978-0999408261.
- 2021: Dotson, J. Dianne (2020). Luminiferous. US: J. Dianne Dotson. p. 442. ISBN 978-0999408285.
- 2023: Dotson, J. Dianne (2023). The Shadow Galaxy. US: Journalstone. p. 440. ISBN 978-1685100681.
- 2023: Dotson, J. Dianne (2023). The Inn at the Amethyst Lantern. US: Android Press. p. 440. ISBN 978-1958121351.
