= WEYE =

Radio station in Surgoinsville, Tennessee

Simulcasts WCQR-FM Kingsport
- Surgoinsville, Tennessee; United States
- Broadcast area: Tri-Cities
- Frequency: 104.3 MHz

Programming
- Format: Christian adult contemporary

Ownership
- Owner: Positive Alternative Radio, Inc.
- Sister stations: WCQR-FM

History
- Former call signs: WOTH (1989–1990); WLKW (1990)

Technical information
- Licensing authority: FCC
- Facility ID: 73872
- Class: A
- ERP: 4,100 watts
- HAAT: 121 meters (397 ft)
- Transmitter coordinates: 36°32′05″N 82°47′52″W

Links
- Public license information: Public file; LMS
- Webcast: Listen Live
- Website: wcqr.org

WEYE (104.3 FM) is a radio station licensed to serve Surgoinsville, Tennessee, United States. The station is owned by Positive Alternative Radio, Inc. It broadcasts a Christian adult contemporary format.

The station was assigned the WEYE call letters by the Federal Communications Commission on July 16, 1990.

== History ==
Former logo

At one time, WEYE was Solid Gospel format with the name Y-104.3 and an SRN affiliate. As "Eagle 104.3" WEYE was "Home of the Country Legends" with a Classic country format.
