= Boones Creek, Tennessee =

Neighborhood in Johnson City, Tennessee, US

Coordinates: 36°23′32″N 82°24′42″W

Boones Creek is a neighborhood of Johnson City, in northern Washington County, Tennessee. Almost all of Boones Creek has been annexed by Johnson City, and has become a neighborhood of Johnson City. However, much of it has the postal addresses of "Gray, Tennessee." It extends along Boone's Creek and other nearby tributaries of Boone Lake, from the strip of restaurants, hotels and other businesses around the intersection of Boone's Creek Road (State Route 354) and Interstate 26, northeastwards to the older business district at the intersection of 354 and State Route 36, and up to Boone Lake, formerly the Watauga River.

== History ==
This community, the first permanent European settlement in Tennessee, was named for the creek that runs through it, which is named for pioneer Daniel Boone. Daniel Boone was a longhunter, responsible for encouraging increasing European settlement from the Appalachian Mountains and westward.

In the center of Boones Creek there was a historic marker that contained a reported story of Daniel Boone hunting in the area (as of 2026, the marker is unaccounted for). On a long hunting trip, he was reportedly chased by Native Americans out of anger at his trespassing in their lands. He is said to have hidden underneath a waterfall on Boones Creek to avoid them. Nearby, a beech tree once stood with the inscription "D Boon cilled a bar on tree in the year 1760." This tree was featured in the film "Sergeant York" when Alvin York, a Tennessee-born WWI Medal of Honor recipient, was trying to earn money by hunting and selling pelts. A large piece of the tree is now in the Boones Creek Historical Trust Museum and Opry.

William Bean, the first white settler in Tennessee, built a cabin and planted corn on Boone's Creek in 1768 to stake a claim to the land, and moved his family there in 1769.

The historic "downtown" of this historically rural community is now called "Flourville," though still considered part of the Boones Creek community. The "Bean Fort-Spring," a two-story log fort that had water from a spring piped into it, was built there around 1775 and is still standing. So are the early-1800s Hale's Store, the area's first store and post office, and an early-1800s mill, the Flourville Mill. Many homes from the late 1700s and early 1800s are nearby.

A post office called Boons Creek was established in 1841, and remained in operation until it was discontinued in 1900.

== Education ==
Washington County Schools operates Boones Creek Elementary and previously operated the Boones Creek Middle School (formerly Boones Creek High School) which was demolished in 2019. There has historically been tension between Washington County officials and Johnson City officials over annexation, funding, and revenue.

City of Johnson City School operates Indian Trail Middle and Lake Ridge Elementary.

High School Students attend either Daniel Boone High School in Gray operated by Washington County Schools or Science Hill High School in Johnson City operated by Johnson City Schools

== Retail ==
There are several restaurants, hotels/motels and gas stations off the Boones Creek Road/Tennessee State Route 354 Exit off Interstate 26. Grocery stores/supermarkets located in Boones Creek are Food City and Ingles Markets.

== Transportation ==
Tennessee State Route 36 (North Roan Street) is the main road through Boones Creek and Tennessee State Route 354 (Boones Creek Road) connects Boones Creek with Interstate 26 and US Route 11E and US Route 321 in Jonesborough.
