= Tennessee State Route 346 =

Highway in Tennessee

State Route 346
- TN 346 highlighted in red

Route information
- Maintained by TDOT
- Length: 24.3 mi (39.1 km)
- Existed: July 1, 1983–present

Major junctions
- South end: US 11W in Surgoinsville
- US 11W in Church Hill
- North end: US 23 / SR 36 in Kingsport

Location
- Country: United States
- State: Tennessee
- Counties: Hawkins, Sullivan

Highway system
- Tennessee State Routes; Interstate; US; State
← SR 345	→ SR 347

State Route 346 (SR 346) is a 24.3-mile-long (39.1 km) state highway in Hawkins and Sullivan counties in the eastern part of the U.S. state of Tennessee. It connects Surgoinsville with Kingsport.

== Route description ==
SR 346 begins in Hawkins County at an intersection with US 11W/SR 1 in Surgoinsville and heads northeast through downtown and has a second intersection with US 11W/SR 1 and turns east onto US 11W/SR 1. The three routes begin a concurrency to Church Hill and then it turns northeast onto Main Street and then turns north onto North Central Avenue. and continues until it leaves the city limits of Church Hill, where it becomes Carter's Valley Road and crosses over the North Fork Holston River into Sullivan County and it meets its northern terminus, an intersection with US 23/SR 36/SR 137 on the north side of Kingsport just 0.2 miles (0.32 km) from the Virginia state-line.

== Major intersections ==
County	Location	mi	km	Destinations	Notes
Hawkins	Surgoinsville			US 11W (Lee Highway/SR 1) – Rogersville, Church Hill	Southern terminus
Hawkins	Surgoinsville			US 11W south (Lee Highway/SR 1 west) – Rogersville	Southern end of concurrency with US 11W/SR 1
Hawkins	Church Hill			US 11W north (Lee Highway/SR 1 east) – Mount Carmel, Kingsport	Northern end of concurrency with US 11W/SR 1
Sullivan	Kingsport			US 23 (SR 137) to I-26 east / SR 36 south (Lynn Garden Drive) – Kingsport, Weber City, VA, Gate City, VA	Northern terminus; road continues east as East Carter's Valley Road; interchange
1.000 mi = 1.609 km; 1.000 km = 0.621 mi: Concurrency terminus

== See also ==
- List of state routes in Tennessee
