= Daniel Richards (wrestler) =

American professional wrestler (born 1980)

Personal information
- Born: Daniel Harnsberger; July 10, 1980 Midlothian, Virginia, U.S.

Professional wrestling career
- Ring name(s): Progressive Liberal; The Bodyguard
- Billed height: 6 ft 5 in (1.96 m)
- Billed weight: 240 lb (109 kg)
- Trained by: Jimmy Garvin; Scotty McKeever
- Debut: October 7, 2003

Daniel Harnsberger (born July 10, 1980) is an American professional wrestler best known by the ring name Daniel Richards. He gained mainstream notice by using a gimmick called the "Progressive Liberal", under which he performs as a heel in conservative and a face in more liberal areas.

== Early life and education ==
Raised in the Richmond suburb of Midlothian, Virginia, the young Harnsberger was described by his mother in a 2017 interview as a child who "always demanded our attention" and someone who "never quit". He began following wrestling after watching a tape of WrestleMania III and later seeing a WWF house show in Richmond. Harnsberger played basketball in high school, and after graduating from Concord University in southern West Virginia in 2003, started training in wrestling. During his training, he supported himself as a reporter with the Daily Telegraph of Bluefield, West Virginia, but left the newspaper at about the time he made his wrestling debut for an independent promotion run by Beau James, who went on to establish AMW and serves as a mentor to Harnsberger to this day. James gave Harnsberger his ring name of Daniel Richards. He continued to work odd jobs to help make ends meet during his early years in the business. While he tried several gimmicks, he was unable to develop a memorable character; he moved back to the Richmond area in 2005, and left wrestling in 2009. For the next five years, he worked many jobs and frequently traveled abroad.

== Character ==
In a 2017 interview, Harnsberger recalled that he began to turn toward the political left during a 2011 trip to Cambodia, with the main catalyst being reports by Al Jazeera and the BBC on the debt-ceiling fight between Barack Obama and United States Congress. He would return to wrestling in 2014 when a longtime acquaintance on the independent circuit needed a wrestler on short notice. Harnsberger devised the "Progressive Liberal" gimmick while on the road in his then job as a courier. He debuted the character during a 2015 show in Sabine, West Virginia, and began billing himself as such in 2016. After Hillary Clinton was defeated by Donald Trump in the 2016 United States presidential election, Harnsberger was concerned that her loss would force him to come up with a new gimmick, but he found that Trump's win emboldened American conservative fans; he would say in the aforementioned interview, "Now, they have something to laugh at me about."

== Championships and accomplishments ==
- Southern States Wrestling
  - SSW Heavyweight Championship (1 time, current)
- Pro Wrestling Illustrated
  - Ranked No. 500 of the top 500 singles wrestlers in the PWI 500 in 2017
