= WMCH =

Radio station in Church Hill, Tennessee

- Church Hill, Tennessee; United States
- Broadcast area: Tri-Cities Tennessee/Virginia
- Frequency: 1260 kHz

Programming
- Format: Religious radio

Ownership
- Owner: Media Link, Inc.

History
- First air date: May 8, 1954

Technical information
- Licensing authority: FCC
- Class: D
- Power: 1,000 watts day 21 watts night
- Transmitter coordinates: 36°31′15″N 82°44′54″W

Links
- Public license information: Public file; LMS
- Website: http://www.wmch.us/

WMCH (1260 AM) is a radio station broadcasting a religious radio format. Licensed to Church Hill, Tennessee, United States, it serves the Tri-Cities Tennessee and Virginia area. The station is currently owned by Media Link, Inc.
