= Tennessee State Route 355 =

State highway in Tennessee, United States

State Route 355
- TN 355 highlighted in red

Route information
- Maintained by TDOT
- Length: 2.6 mi (4.2 km)
- Existed: July 1, 1983–present

Major junctions
- South end: SR 126 in Kingsport
- North end: SR 36 in Kingsport

Location
- Country: United States
- State: Tennessee
- Counties: Sullivan

Highway system
- Tennessee State Routes; Interstate; US; State
← SR 354	→ SR 356

State Route 355 (SR 355) is a state highway in Kingsport, Sullivan County, Tennessee.

== Route description ==
SR 355 begins at an intersection with SR 126 just south of downtown Kingsport and travels northwestward through an industrial area and follows closely to some railroad tracks.

After 1.4 miles (2.3 km) the railroad crosses over SR 355 and SR 355 continues northwestward.

It then junctions with Netherland Inn Road at a roundabout and turns eastward on to West Center Street and comes to end at SR 36 in downtown Kingsport.

== Major junctions ==
The entire route is in Kingsport, Sullivan County.

mi	km	Destinations	Notes
0.00	0.00	SR 126 (Wilcox Drive) to I-26 – Greeneville	Southern terminus; Access to I-26 via SR 126 west
		Netherland Inn Road – Netherland Inn	Roundabout; SR 355 becomes West Center Street
2.06	3.32	SR 36 (West Center Street / Lynn Garden Drive) – Gate City, Downtown Kingsport	Northern terminus; SR 36 continues east as West Center Street and turns northward as Lynn Garden Drive
1.000 mi = 1.609 km; 1.000 km = 0.621 mi
