= WABN =

Radio station in Abingdon, Virginia

- Abingdon, Virginia; United States
- Broadcast area: Abingdon, Virginia; Lebanon, Virginia; Washington County, Virginia
- Frequency: 1230 kHz
- Branding: Truth 104.1 FM & 1230 AM

Programming
- Format: Talk
- Affiliations: Compass Media Networks; Premiere Networks; Townhall News

Ownership
- Owner: Appalachian Educational Communication Corporation; (Information Communications Corporation)
- Sister stations: WETB, WHGG, WPWT

History
- First air date: December 10, 1956 (as WBBI)
- Former call signs: WBBI (1956–1992)
- Call sign meaning: Abingdon

Technical information
- Licensing authority: FCC
- Facility ID: 36981
- Class: C
- Power: 1,000 watts
- Transmitter coordinates: 36°44′3.0″N 81°58′18.0″W
- Translators: 103.3 W277BT (Abingdon); 104.1 W281CF (Abingdon)

Links
- Public license information: Public file; LMS
- Webcast: Listen Live
- Website: truth1041.com

WABN (1230 AM) is a talk-formatted non-commercial radio station licensed to Abingdon, Virginia. The station's signal serves the towns of Abingdon, Lebanon, both in Virginia, and the twin cities of Bristol in Virginia and in Tennessee. WABN is owned and operated by Appalachian Educational Communication Corporation.

WABN was launched on December 10, 1956, and has served the town of Abingdon for almost 60 years. Beginning as WBBI, the station has carried various formats including country music and religious. Over the years, the station aired programming from the Mutual Broadcasting System and later the NBC Radio Network.

WABN has been sold several times, including once to Bristol Broadcasting Company, which owns stations in Bristol. The station's current owner, Bristol, Tennessee-based Appalachian Educational Communication Corporation, purchased WABN on May 5, 2004. Since 2011, WABN has been simulcasting on an FM translator station to increase its broadcast area.

== History ==
=== Pre-launch ===
The original application for WABN was filed on March 6, 1956. The principal owners listed on the application were Nelson T. Barker and Lindy M. Seamon. At the time of the filing, Seamon was the general manager and chief engineer at WRIC.

On their application, the pair estimated the construction costs of building the station at $19,904, with the first year operating costs at $20,000. First year revenue was estimated at $30,000. The application was approved by the Federal Communications Commission (FCC) on October 10, 1956. The new station was given the call sign WBBI during the first week of November 1956.

=== WBBI era ===
On December 10, 1956, WBBI took to the airwaves for the first time, operating at 250 watts day and night. At the time of its launch, it was owned by Burley Broadcasting Company, which filed for a license to cover on January 9, 1957. This was approved on January 11.

In April 1957, WBBI was honored with two awards by the Virginia Associated Press Broadcasters Association (VAPBA). In the "Commentary" category, the station was awarded second place in the "Non-Metropolitan" division. The station placed third in the "Sports" category in the "Non-Metropolitan" division. Burley Broadcasting Company transferred WBBI to Burley Broadcasting, Inc. for $20,000 in late July 1957. Under the new company, original owners Nelson T. Barker and Lindy M. Seamon transferred 25% of their shares to their wives, Ethel and Frances, respectively. In April 1958, the station was again honored with a VAPBA award, this time for "Women's News".

On January 26, 1959, WBBI was granted permission to change from an unlimited or 24-hour-a-day schedule to a daytime only schedule. The station would sign on at 6:00 am and sign off at 7:00 pm. The VAPBA presented the station with awards in the "State and Local News", "Farm", "Special Events", and "Women's News" categories on May 2, 1959. The station received VAPBA awards for "State and Local News", "Commentary", and "Women's News" in 1960.

On September 14, 1960, Burley Broadcasting applied to increase the station's daytime power to 1,000 watts, while keeping its nighttime power at 250 watts. The power increase was granted November 29, 1961. In May 1962, further VAPBA awards were presented to WBBI in the "Comprehensive News", "Commentary", "Sports", "Women's News", and "Farm" categories.

On December 10, 1966, 10 years to the day after WBBI launched, sister station WBBI-FM signed on. At the time, both WBBI and WBBI-FM were carrying a country format with programming from the Mutual Broadcasting System. On April 26, 1968, Nelson and Ethel Barker sold their shares of WBBI (and WBBI-FM) to co-owners Lindy and Frances Seamon for $30,000. The sale was granted on May 17, 1968.

Sister station WBBI-FM applied for the WABN-FM call sign in mid-March 1980. The application was granted in mid-May 1980. In July 1982, Burley Broadcasting began the process of selling WBBI and sister station WABN-FM to Southern Communications, Inc. for $500,000. The sale was approved on September 24, 1982.

In 1984, WBBI dropped programming from the Mutual Broadcasting System in favor of programming from the NBC Radio Network. In mid-February 1987, Southern Communications agreed to sell WBBI, along with sister station WABN-FM, to Edwards and Sutherland Broadcasting Company for $466,200. The new company would be operated by Richard W. Edwards and Craig Sutherland. At the time, Edwards also owned WDIC. The sale was granted in late April/early May.

=== Present era ===
On August 2, 1992, the station's call sign was changed from WBBI to the current WABN.

On October 17, 1995, WABN was placed in debtor in possession status by the FCC. Almost four years later, on November 11, 1999, WABN and WABN-FM were sold to Bristol Broadcasting Company for an unknown sum. Less than two years later, on July 5, 2001, Bristol Broadcasting Company donated WABN to the Abingdon Church of the Nazarene. Bristol Broadcasting Company retained its sister station, now under the WFHG-FM call sign.

On May 16, 2003, WABN was once again on the seller's block, this time to be sold to Living Faith Ministries, Inc. for $50,000. The sale was not consummated and the Abingdon Church of the Nazarene retained ownership of the station.

The Abingdon Church of the Nazarene tried again, on April 26, 2004, to sell WABN. The Appalachian Educational Communication Corporation (AECC), based in Bristol, Tennessee, agreed to purchase the station for $50,000. Director of the Tennessee Regulatory Authority, Kenneth C. Hill, is the president and CEO of AECC. At the time of the sale, WABN was broadcasting a religious format. The sale was closed on May 5, 2004.

In 2009, WABN switched to an oldies and classic hits format. On September 27, 2011, WABN began simulcasting its signal onto translator station W277BT 103.3, which is also licensed to Abingdon. WABN is operated as a non-commercial station. WABN previously aired a mix of local information and sports, along with the oldies and classic hits music.

WABN currently airs a talk format.

== Programming ==
WABN produces a local public service program called "Abingdon Talks", which airs on Sundays. The station broadcasts the entire schedule of Abingdon High School athletics live throughout the year.

Syndicated programs heard on WABN include Earth & Sky, "Streets of Gold" which airs on Sunday mornings and the Old Farmer's Almanac "Radio Report". The station is an affiliate of the Virginia Market News Service, a division of the Virginia Department of Agriculture and Consumer Services. Mike Cox, a staff meteorologist at AECC, provides local weather forecasts on WABN twice an hour.

== Translator ==
In addition to the main station, WABN is relayed by an FM broadcast translator to widen its broadcast area.

Call sign	Frequency	City of license	FID	ERP (W)	HAAT	Class	FCC info
W277BT	103.3 FM	Abingdon, Virginia	143217	190 watts	110.6 m (363 ft)	D	LMS
W281CF	104.1 FM	Abingdon, Virginia	200961	250 watts	83 m (272 ft)	D	LMS
