= Hunter, Tennessee =

Hunter Stoney Creek
- CDP
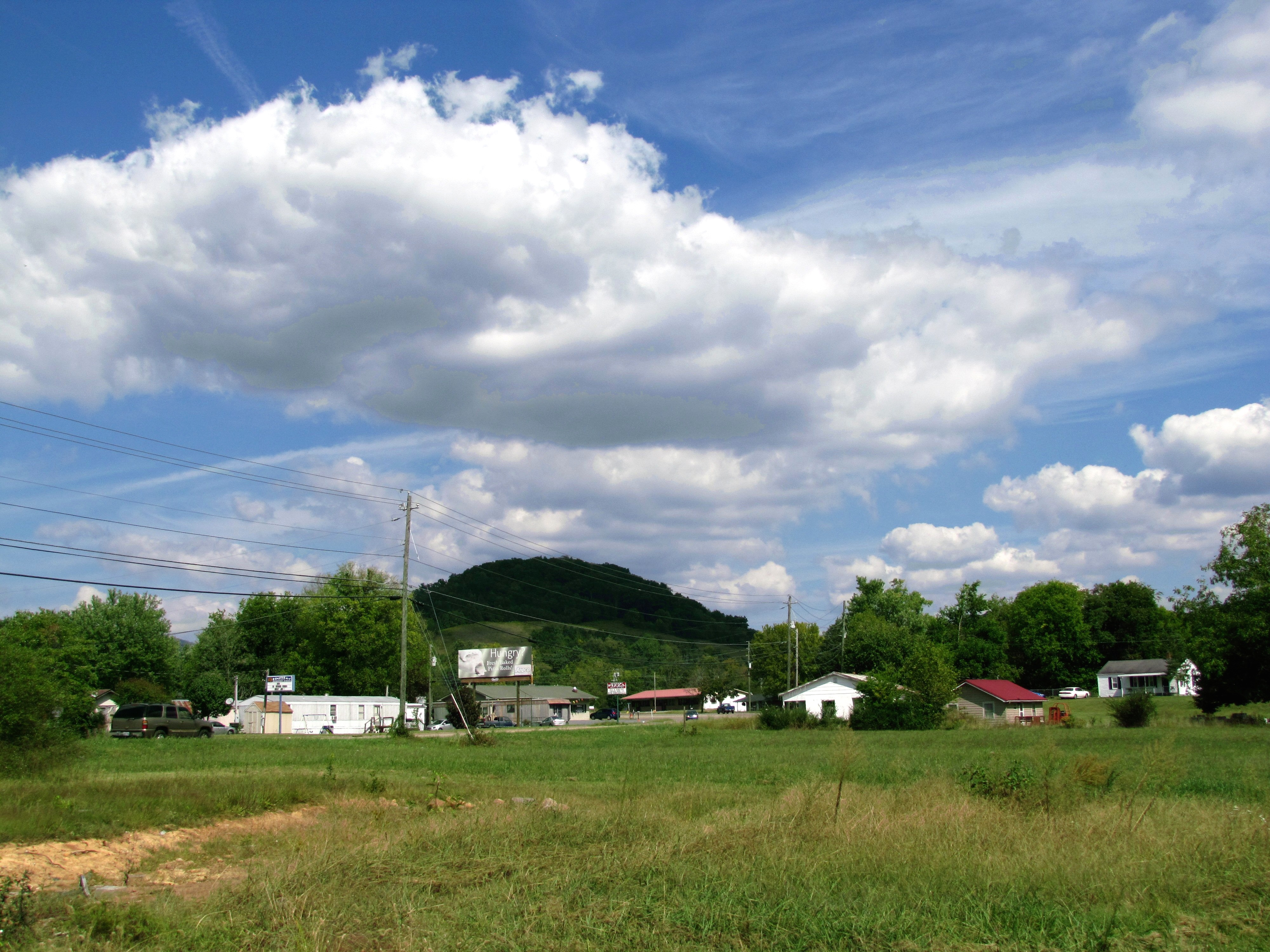

- Location of Hunter, Tennessee
- Coordinates: 36°22′36″N 82°9′18″W
- Country: United States
- State: Tennessee
- County: Carter

Area
  - Total: 6.42 sq mi (16.64 km^{2})
  - Land: 6.40 sq mi (16.57 km^{2})
  - Water: 0.027 sq mi (0.07 km^{2})
- Elevation: 1,568 ft (478 m)

Population (2020)
  - Total: 1,803
  - Density: 281.9/sq mi (108.83/km^{2})
- Time zone: UTC-5 (Eastern (EST))
  - Summer (DST): UTC-4 (EDT)
- ZIP code: 37643
- Area code: 423
- FIPS code: 47-36500
- GNIS feature ID: 1328513

Hunter (also called Stoney Creek) is a census-designated place (CDP) and unincorporated community located northeast of Elizabethton in Carter County, Tennessee, along Tennessee State Route 91 and the Watauga River. Its population was 1,854 as of the 2010 census. It is part of the Johnson City Metropolitan Statistical Area, which is a component of the Johnson City-Kingsport-Bristol, TN-VA Combined Statistical Area – commonly known as the "Tri-Cities" region. Hunter is a suburb of Elizabethton.

== Geography ==
Hunter is located at 36°22′36″N 82°9′18″W (36.376630, -82.155032).

According to the United States Census Bureau, the CDP has a total area of 6.411 square miles (16.60 km^{2}), of which 6.386 square miles (16.54 km^{2}) of it is land and 0.025 square miles (0.065 km^{2}) of it (0.39%) is water.

The Watauga River forms a southern boundary for the Hunter community, while the Holston Mountain forms a northern boundary.

== Demographics ==
Historical population
Census	Pop.	Note	%±
2020	1,803		—
U.S. Decennial Census

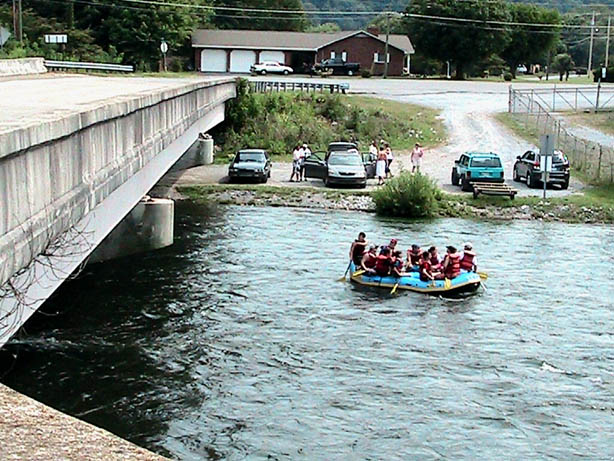
Whitewater rafters floating downstream by the Hunter Bridge put-in on the Watauga River.

As of the census of 2000, there were 1,566 people, 689 households, and 491 families residing in the CDP. The population density was 254.9 inhabitants per square mile (98.4/km^{2}). There were 729 housing units at an average density of 118.6 per square mile (45.8/km^{2}). The racial makeup of the CDP was 99.17% White, 0.13% African American, 0.06% Native American, 0.13% Asian, 0.06% from other races, and 0.45% from two or more races. Hispanic or Latino of any race were 1.15% of the population.

There were 689 households, out of which 27.7% had children under the age of 18 living with them, 57.9% were married couples living together, 10.7% had a female householder with no husband present, and 28.7% were non-families. 25.5% of all households were made up of individuals, and 10.9% had someone living alone who was 65 years of age or older. The average household size was 2.27 and the average family size was 2.71.

In the CDP, the population was spread out, with 19.3% under the age of 18, 8.0% from 18 to 24, 28.7% from 25 to 44, 27.3% from 45 to 64, and 16.7% who were 65 years of age or older. The median age was 41 years. For every 100 females, there were 90.0 males. For every 100 females age 18 and over, there were 88.5 males.

The median income for a household in the CDP was $30,968, and the median income for a family was $37,981. Males had a median income of $25,000 versus $20,668 for females. The per capita income for the CDP was $15,590. About 5.6% of families and 8.7% of the population were below the poverty line, including 9.7% of those under age 18 and 8.5% of those age 65 or over.

== Education ==
Schools in Hunter/Stoney Creek are operated by Carter County Schools:

- Hunter Elementary – Grades PK–8
- Unaka Elementary – Grades PK–8
- Unaka High - Grades 9–12

The Elizabethton campus of Northeast State Community College is located near Hunter.

== Connection with U.S. Interstate Highway System ==
Interstate 26 Exit 24 at Johnson City then east on
Tennessee State Route 67 to Elizabethton, then left on
Tennessee State Route 67 /US 19E then right on
Tennessee State Route 91 Stoney Creek Exit to Hunter.
