= Midway, Washington County, Tennessee =

Midway
- Unincorporated community
- Location within the state of Tennessee
- Coordinates: 36°17′39″N 82°25′8″W
- Country: United States
- State: Tennessee
- County: Washington

Area
  - Total: 6.2 sq mi (16.0 km^{2})
  - Land: 6.2 sq mi (16.0 km^{2})
  - Water: 0 sq mi (0.0 km^{2})
- Elevation: 1,877 ft (572 m)

Population (2000)
  - Total: 2,491
  - Density: 402/sq mi (155.3/km^{2})
- Time zone: UTC-5 (Eastern (EST))
  - Summer (DST): UTC-4 (EDT)
- FIPS code: 47-48630
- GNIS feature ID: 1328901

Midway is an unincorporated community and former census-designated place (CDP) in Washington County, Tennessee. The population was 2,491 at the 2000 census; it was not counted at the 2010 census. It is part of the Johnson City Metropolitan Statistical Area, which is a component of the Johnson City-Kingsport-Bristol, TN-VA Combined Statistical Area – commonly known as the "Tri-Cities" region.

The community is located on Old State Route 34, a former alignment of US Route 11E between Jonesborough and Johnson City.

== Geography ==
Midway is located at 36°17′39″N 82°25′8″W (36.294192, -82.418813).

According to the United States Census Bureau, the CDP has a total area of 6.2 square miles (16 km^{2}), all of it land.

== Demographics ==
As of the census of 2000, there were 2,491 people, 1,011 households, and 761 families residing in the CDP. The population density was 402.1 inhabitants per square mile (155.3/km^{2}). There were 1,069 housing units at an average density of 172.6 per square mile (66.6/km^{2}). The racial makeup of the CDP was 95.66% White, 1.69% African American, 0.32% Native American, 0.56% Asian, 0.08% Pacific Islander, 0.48% from other races, and 1.20% from two or more races. Hispanic or Latino of any race were 0.60% of the population.

There were 1,011 households, out of which 27.7% had children under the age of 18 living with them, 61.3% were married couples living together, 9.6% had a female householder with no husband present, and 24.7% were non-families. 19.7% of all households were made up of individuals, and 6.4% had someone living alone who was 65 years of age or older. The average household size was 2.46 and the average family size was 2.82.

In the CDP, the population was spread out, with 20.9% under the age of 18, 9.0% from 18 to 24, 31.4% from 25 to 44, 26.4% from 45 to 64, and 12.4% who were 65 years of age or older. The median age was 38 years. For every 100 females, there were 95.4 males. For every 100 females age 18 and over, there were 92.7 males.

The median income for a household in the CDP was $32,594, and the median income for a family was $37,716. Males had a median income of $28,661 versus $21,536 for females. The per capita income for the CDP was $15,232. About 10.9% of families and 12.4% of the population were below the poverty line, including 19.4% of those under age 18 and 8.0% of those age 65 or over.
