= WHCB =

Coordinates: 36.434°N 82.134°W

- Bristol, Tennessee; United States
- Broadcast area: Tri-Cities, VA/TN
- Frequency: 91.5 MHz
- Branding: The Blessing

Programming
- Format: Religious

Ownership
- Owner: Appalachian Educational Communications Corp.

History
- First air date: 1999
- Former call signs: WKKB (1982)
- Call sign meaning: We Herald Christ's Blessing

Technical information
- Licensing authority: FCC
- Facility ID: 2460
- Class: C1
- ERP: 1,500 watts
- HAAT: 715 meters (2,346 ft)

Links
- Public license information: Public file; LMS
- Webcast: WHCB Webstream
- Website: WHCB Online

WHCB (91.5 FM) is a Religious formatted broadcast radio station licensed to Bristol, Tennessee, serving the Tri-Cities, VA/TN area. WHCB is owned and operated by Appalachian Educational Communications Corp.

Previous logo
