= Banner Hill, Tennessee =

Banner Hill
- CDP
- Location of Banner Hill, Tennessee
- Coordinates: 36°7′43″N 82°24′51″W
- Country: United States
- State: Tennessee
- County: Unicoi

Area
  - Total: 1.40 sq mi (3.62 km^{2})
  - Land: 1.40 sq mi (3.62 km^{2})
  - Water: 0 sq mi (0.00 km^{2})
- Elevation: 1,677 ft (511 m)

Population (2020)
  - Total: 1,426
  - Density: 1,019.7/sq mi (393.71/km^{2})
- Time zone: UTC-5 (Eastern (EST))
  - Summer (DST): UTC-4 (EDT)
- ZIP code: 37650
- Area code: 423
- FIPS code: 47-03120
- GNIS feature ID: 1327499

Banner Hill is a census-designated place (CDP) in Unicoi County, Tennessee, United States. The population was 1,497 at the 2010 census. It is part of the Johnson City Metropolitan Statistical Area, which is a component of the Johnson City–Kingsport–Bristol, TN-VA Combined Statistical Area – commonly known as the "Tri-Cities" region. Banner Hill is a suburb of Erwin and uses Erwin's zip code.

== Geography ==
Banner Hill is located at 36°7′43″N 82°24′51″W (36.128608, -82.414039).

According to the United States Census Bureau, the CDP has a total area of 1.4 square miles (3.6 km^{2}), all of it land.

== Demographics ==
Historical population
Census	Pop.	Note	%±
2020	1,426		—
U.S. Decennial Census

As of the census of 2000, there were 1,053 people, 460 households, and 334 families residing in the CDP. The population density was 391.7 inhabitants per square mile (151.2/km^{2}). There were 513 housing units at an average density of 190.8 per square mile (73.7/km^{2}). The racial makeup of the CDP was 98.77% White, 0.38% African American, 0.28% Pacific Islander, 0.09% from other races, and 0.47% from two or more races. Hispanic or Latino of any race were 0.38% of the population.

There were 460 households, out of which 28.9% had children under the age of 18 living with them, 56.5% were married couples living together, 11.5% had a female householder with no husband present, and 27.2% were non-families. 25.2% of all households were made up of individuals, and 14.3% had someone living alone who was 65 years of age or older. The average household size was 2.29 and the average family size was 2.70.

In the CDP, the population was spread out, with 20.4% under the age of 18, 8.2% from 18 to 24, 28.7% from 25 to 44, 24.3% from 45 to 64, and 18.4% who were 65 years of age or older. The median age was 40 years. For every 100 females, there were 89.0 males. For every 100 females age 18 and over, there were 88.3 males.

The median income for a household in the CDP was $22,946, and the median income for a family was $28,125. Males had a median income of $27,917 versus $19,643 for females. The per capita income for the CDP was $13,784. About 25.0% of families and 27.5% of the population were below the poverty line, including 43.8% of those under age 18 and 33.7% of those age 65 or over.
