= Johnson City metropolitan area, Tennessee =

Metropolitan area in Tennessee, US

Johnson City, TN
- Metropolitan Statistical Area
- Johnson City, TN
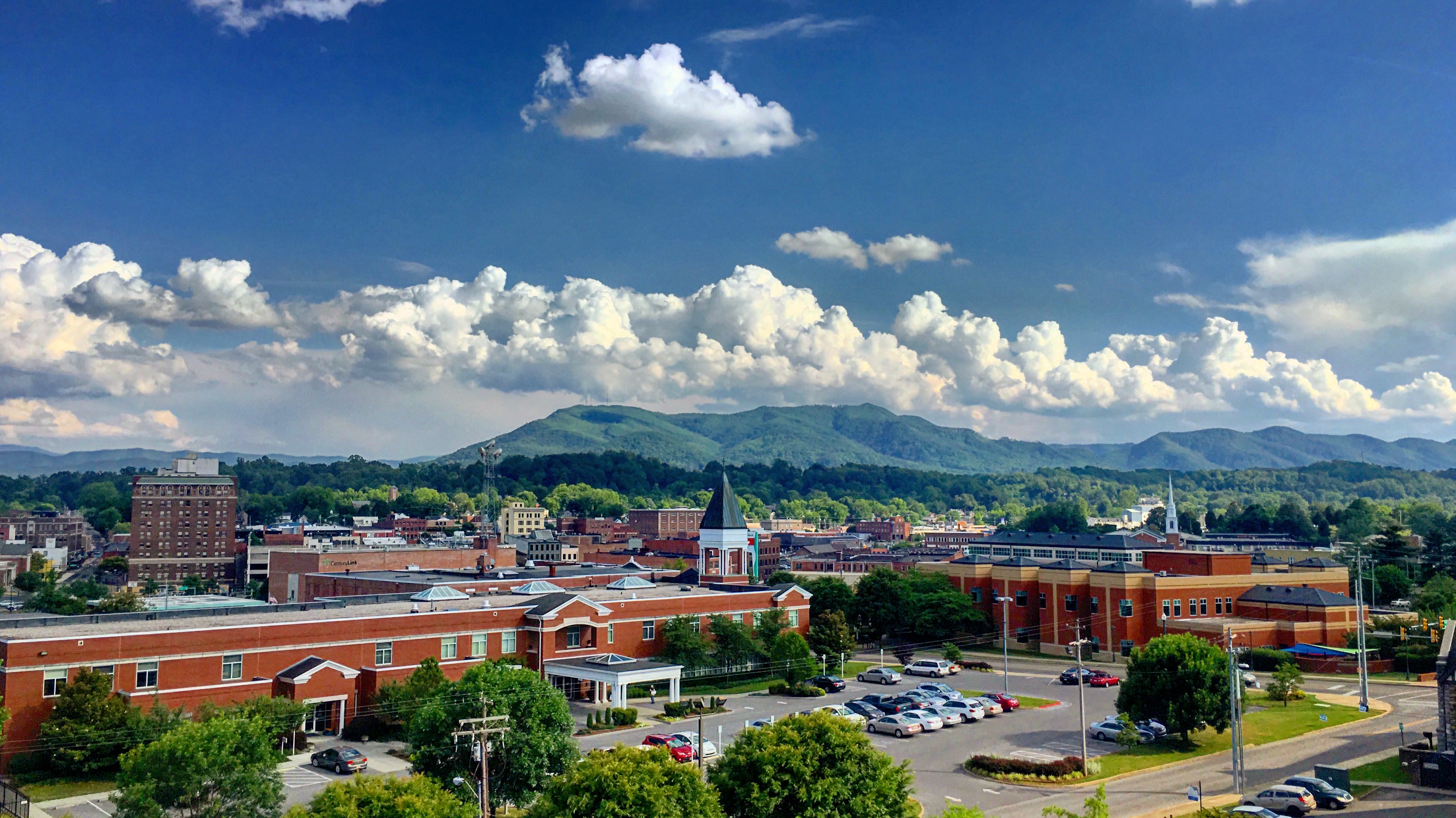
- Downtown Johnson City
Johnson City–Kingsport–Bristol, TN–VA CSA
Kingsport–Bristol, TN–VA MSA
Johnson City, TN MSA
Greeneville, TN µSA
Kingsport, TN
Johnson City, TN
Bristol, TN and Bristol, VA
- Country: United States
- State: Tennessee
- Counties: Carter County; Unicoi County; Washington County
- Time zone: UTC−5 (EST)
  - Summer (DST): UTC−4 (EDT)

The Johnson City Metropolitan Statistical Area, as defined by the United States Census Bureau, is an area consisting of three counties in East Tennessee, anchored by the city of Johnson City. As of the 2020 census, the MSA had a population of 207,285.

== Counties ==
- Carter
- Unicoi
- Washington

== Communities ==
=== Places with more than 50,000 inhabitants ===
- Johnson City (principal city; partial)

=== Places with 10,000 to 50,000 inhabitants ===
- Elizabethton

=== Places with 5,000 to 10,000 inhabitants ===
- Erwin

=== Places with 2,500 to 5,000 inhabitants ===
- Central (census-designated place)
- Jonesborough
- Oak Grove (census-designated place)
- Pine Crest (census-designated place)
- Spurgeon (census-designated place; partial)
- Unicoi

=== Places with 1,000 to 2,500 inhabitants ===
- Banner Hill (census-designated place)
- Fall Branch (census-designated place; partial)
- Gray (census-designated place)
- Hampton (census-designated place)
- Hunter (census-designated place)
- Midway (census-designated place)
- Roan Mountain (census-designated place)

=== Places with less than 1,000 inhabitants ===
- Watauga

=== Unincorporated places ===
- Flag Pond
- Limestone (partial)
- Telford

== Demographics ==
As of the census of 2020, there were 207,285 people, 86,767 households, and 51,518 families residing within the MSA. The racial makeup of the MSA was 89.1% White, 2.4% African American, 0.2% Native American, 0.7% Asian, 0.9% from other races, and 6.7% from two or more races. Hispanic or Latino of any race were 3.5% of the population.

The median income for a household in the MSA was $51,119, and the median income for a family was $69,339. The per capita income for the MSA was $27,870.

== Combined Statistical Area ==
The Johnson City–Kingsport–Bristol Combined Statistical Area (CSA) is made up of five counties in Eastern Tennessee as well as two counties and an independent city in Southwestern Virginia. The statistical area includes two metropolitan areas. As of the 2020 Census, the CSA had a population of 514,899.

=== Components ===
- Metropolitan Statistical Areas (MSAs)
  - Johnson City (Carter County, TN; Unicoi County, TN; Washington, TN)
  - Kingsport–Bristol–Bristol (Hawkins County, TN; Sullivan County, TN; Scott County, VA; Washington County, VA; City of Bristol, VA)

== See also ==
- Tennessee census statistical areas
