= Church Hill, Tennessee =

Church Hill
- City
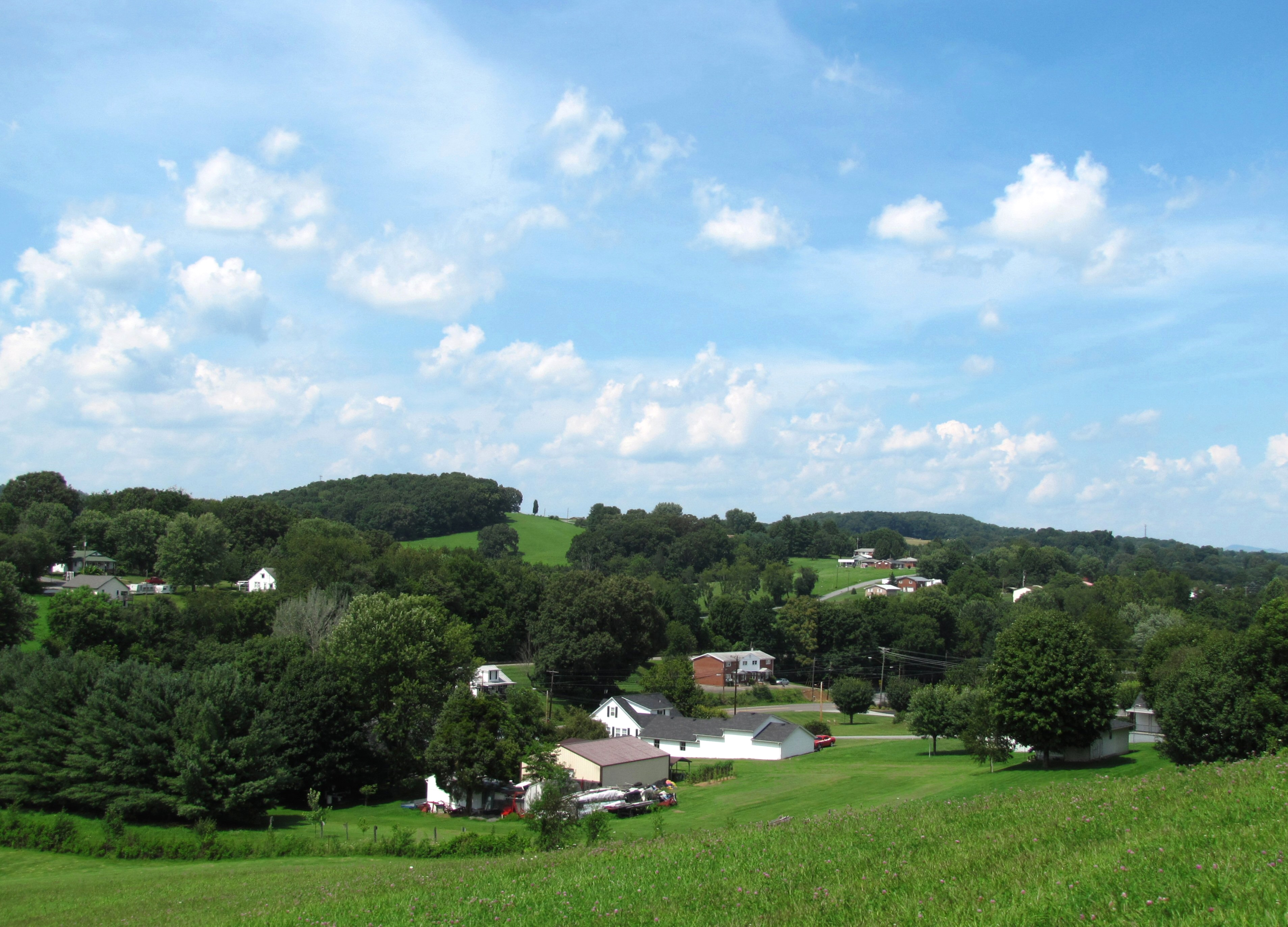

- Location of Church Hill in Hawkins County, Tennessee
- Coordinates: 36°31′15″N 82°43′32″W
- Country: United States
- State: Tennessee
- County: Hawkins

Area
  - Total: 9.85 sq mi (25.52 km^{2})
  - Land: 9.44 sq mi (24.44 km^{2})
  - Water: 0.42 sq mi (1.09 km^{2})
- Elevation: 1,217 ft (371 m)

Population (2020)
  - Total: 6,998
  - Density: 741.7/sq mi (286.39/km^{2})
- Time zone: UTC-5 (Eastern (EST))
  - Summer (DST): UTC-4 (EDT)
- ZIP codes: 37642, 37645
- Area codes: 423 and 729
- FIPS code: 47-14980
- GNIS feature ID: 1305931
- Website: www.churchhilltn.gov

Church Hill is a city in Hawkins County, Tennessee, United States. The population was 6,998 at the 2020 census and 6,737 at the 2010 census. It is part of the Kingsport-Bristol-Bristol, TN-VA Metropolitan Statistical Area, which is a component of the "Tri-Cities" region. It is the largest municipality located entirely within Hawkins County.

== History ==
The community was established as a trading post and stagecoach stop called Spencer's Mill and Patterson Mill in the late 18th century. The name "Church Hill" came later, following the establishment of a Methodist church "on the hill" overlooking the Holston River valley. The church still stands today on Grandview Street. The city of Church Hill was incorporated in 1958.

One of Church Hill's most notable landmarks is the New Canton Plantation and its antebellum mansion, Canton Hall, owned by the Hord family. Other landmarks include Smith Place, built in the early 20th century, and the former site of Carter's Store, a 1770s-era trading outpost established by Tennessee pioneer John Carter.

== Geography ==
Church Hill is located in eastern Hawkins County at 36°31′15″N 82°43′32″W (36.520845, -82.725472). The city is situated among rolling hills on the northern portion of Smith Bend, overlooking the Holston River. The city is bordered by Mount Carmel to the northeast, and the Holston Army Ammunition Plant lies to the southeast, across the Holston River. Bays Mountain, a prominent Ridge-and-Valley formation, dominates the horizon to the south.

U.S. Route 11W connects Church Hill with Rogersville to the southwest and the Tri-Cities area to the northeast. State Route 346 intersects 11W near the center of the city.

According to the United States Census Bureau, the city has a total area of 9.8 square miles (25.4 km^{2}), of which 9.3 square miles (24.2 km^{2}) are land and 0.46 square miles (1.2 km^{2}), or 4.63%, are water.

== Demographics ==
Historical population
Census	Pop.	Note	%±
1960	769		—
1970	2,822		267.0%
1980	4,110		45.6%
1990	4,834		17.6%
2000	5,916		22.4%
2010	6,737		13.9%
2020	6,998		3.9%

=== 2020 census ===
As of the 2020 census, Church Hill had a population of 6,998, 2,943 households, and 1,946 families residing in the city. The median age was 45.9 years. 19.1% of residents were under the age of 18 and 22.9% of residents were 65 years of age or older. For every 100 females there were 93.0 males, and for every 100 females age 18 and over there were 89.5 males age 18 and over.

78.5% of residents lived in urban areas, while 21.5% lived in rural areas.

There were 2,943 households in Church Hill, of which 27.3% had children under the age of 18 living in them. Of all households, 52.5% were married-couple households, 16.0% were households with a male householder and no spouse or partner present, and 26.0% were households with a female householder and no spouse or partner present. About 26.9% of all households were made up of individuals and 13.9% had someone living alone who was 65 years of age or older.

There were 3,189 housing units, of which 7.7% were vacant. The homeowner vacancy rate was 1.5% and the rental vacancy rate was 9.7%.

Racial composition as of the 2020 census
Race	Number	Percent
White	6,595	94.2%
Black or African American	72	1.0%
American Indian and Alaska Native	9	0.1%
Asian	40	0.6%
Native Hawaiian and Other Pacific Islander	3	0.0%
Some other race	30	0.4%
Two or more races	249	3.6%
Hispanic or Latino (of any race)	85	1.2%

=== 2000 census ===
As of the census of 2000, there was a population of 5,916, with 2,482 households and 1,772 families residing in the city. The population density was 665.8 inhabitants per square mile (257.1/km^{2}). There were 2,709 housing units at an average density of 304.9 per square mile (117.7/km^{2}). The racial makeup of the city was 97.95% White, 1.30% African American, 0.12% Native American, 0.22% Asian, 0.07% from other races, and 0.34% from two or more races. Hispanic or Latino of any race were 0.41% of the population.

There were 2,482 households, out of which 29.2% had children under the age of 18 living with them, 59.5% were married couples living together, 9.9% had a female householder with no husband present, and 28.6% were non-families. 25.5% of all households were made up of individuals, and 9.1% had someone living alone who was 65 years of age or older. The average household size was 2.34 and the average family size was 2.78.

In the city, the population was spread out, with 21.4% under the age of 18, 6.5% from 18 to 24, 30.2% from 25 to 44, 26.9% from 45 to 64, and 15.0% who were 65 years of age or older. The median age was 39 years. For every 100 females, there were 89.4 males. For every 100 females age 18 and over, there were 85.7 males.

The median income for a household in the city was $36,563, and the median income for a family was $43,423. Males had a median income of $32,305 versus $25,010 for females. The per capita income for the city was $19,656. About 10.0% of families and 12.0% of the population were below the poverty line, including 16.2% of those under age 18 and 10.5% of those age 65 or over.

== Education ==
Church Hill has one library, Church Hill Public Library, which is part of the Eastern Branch of the Hawkins County Library System. It was founded in 1952, and was moved into a new building in 2007. The library holds over 20,000 materials and serves over 6,000 patrons.

== Education ==
Five schools are located within Church Hill's city limits: Carter's Valley Elementary, Church Hill Elementary, Church Hill Middle School, Church Hill Intermediate and Volunteer High School. All fall under the Hawkins County Schools system.

== Parks and recreation ==
Church Hill has seven parks: Laurel Run Park, A.S. Derrick Park, Jaycees Park, J.W. Sally Park, S.L. Taylor Park, Bill Castle Park, and Church Hill's Public basketball court located at the site of the old skatepark. The city also has one swimming pool, Church Hill Municipal Pool.

The City of Church Hill, City of Mount Carmel, and Town of Surgoinsville have joined together to form a joint Recreation Department. They offer indoor/outdoor soccer, baseball, football, and basketball.

== Government ==
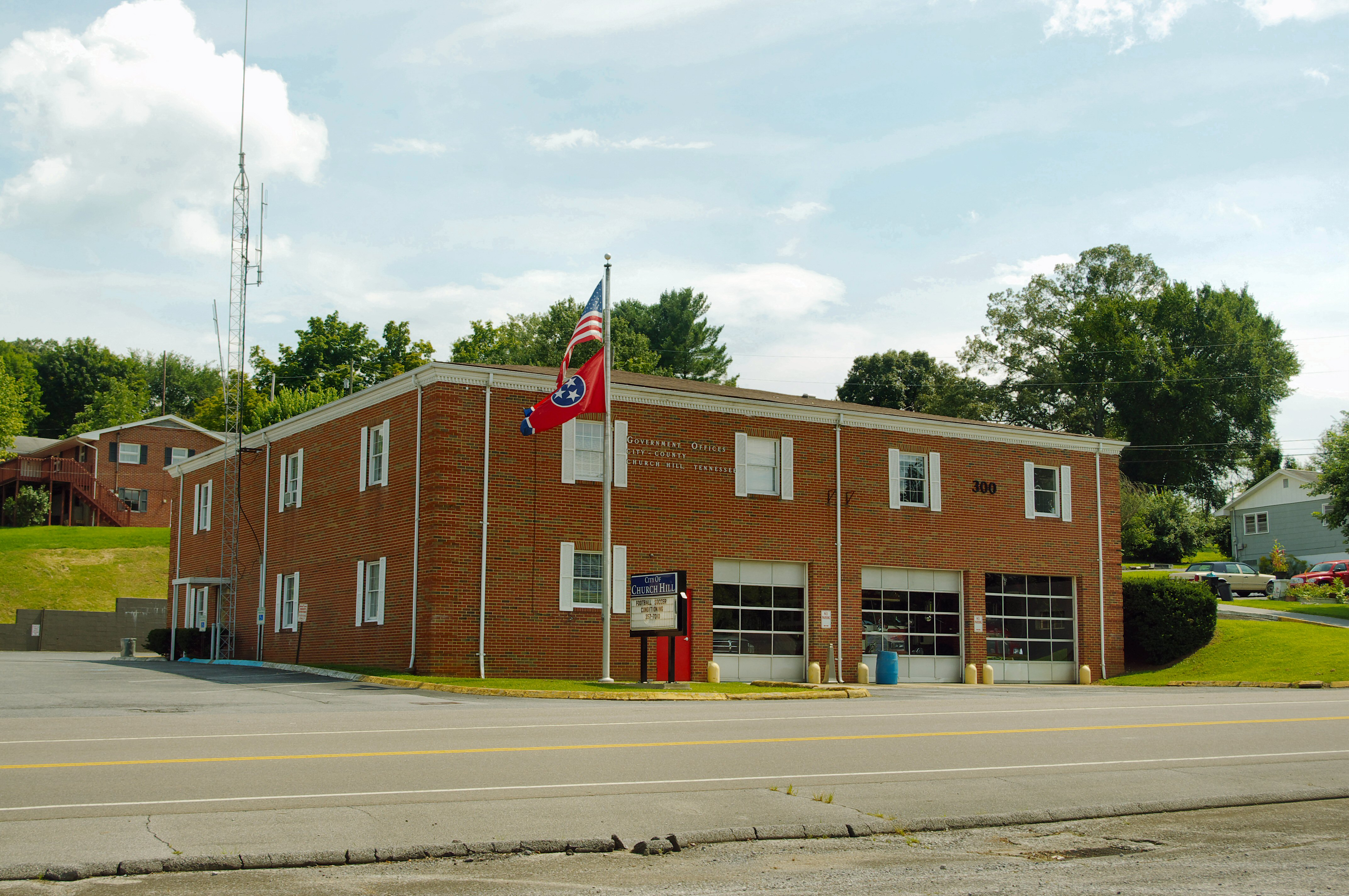
Church Hill's city hall and municipal offices

The city is governed by a mayor and six aldermen.

The city has a police department that also provides animal control services and a fire department that handles public safety, hazmat and fire emergencies.

=== Infrastructure ===
Church Hill provides the community with trash pickup, snow and ice removal, mowing and park maintenance services. Residents of the city obtain power services from Holston Electric Cooperative or Appalachian Power. Water services are provided by a private utility, First Utility District of Hawkins County. Hawkins County Gas Utility provides natural gas services and internet and phone services are provided by Charter Communications or CenturyLink.

== Notable people ==
- Lloyd Carr, former football head coach for the University of Michigan was born in Church Hill, and lived there as a child.
- Blake Leeper, 2012 U.S. Paralympian competing in track and field
- James Alan Shelton, bluegrass guitarist

== See also ==
- WMCH
