= Daniel Boone High School (Tennessee) =

Location
- 1440 Suncrest Drive; Gray, Tennessee 37615; United States
- Coordinates: 36°22′57.5″N 82°30′4.9″W

Information
- Type: public high school
- Established: 1971; 55 years ago
- School district: Washington County Schools
- Principal: Stephanie Gray
- Teaching staff: 84.33 (FTE)
- Grades: 9–12
- Enrollment: 1,146 (2023–2024)
- Student to teacher ratio: 13.59
- Colors: Scarlet; Old gold
- Song: Daniel Boone Theme song (unofficial)
- Mascot: Daniel Boone-Trailblazer
- Website: www.wcde.org/o/dbhs

Daniel Boone High School is a public high school located in Gray, Tennessee, US. It is one of two high schools in the Washington County Schools system.

Daniel Boone High School opened in 1971–72 to serve the students of the northern half of Washington County, Tennessee. Its feeder schools are Boones Creek Elementary, Fall Branch School (elementary and middle school), Gray Elementary, Ridgeview Elementary, and Sulphur Springs Elementary.

Daniel Boone High School's enrollment has been fairly steady for the last few years, remaining between 1,100 and 1,300 students. Daniel Boone High School has a Marine Corps ROTC program with drill teams.

The school's athletic and academic teams compete as the "Trailblazers" and wear colors of scarlet and old gold. In 2008, the football field was named after long time head coach Ken Green. He had been coach for 29 years, from 1972 to 2001.

Annually, the football team plays David Crockett High School in the "Musket Bowl" game. The rivalry, which goes back 49 years, is played between the two high schools in Washington County, Tennessee. The winner receives a replica musket which is traded back and forth. As of 2023, the standings heavily favor Daniel Boone at 39–14.
