= Telford, Tennessee =

Telford
- CDP
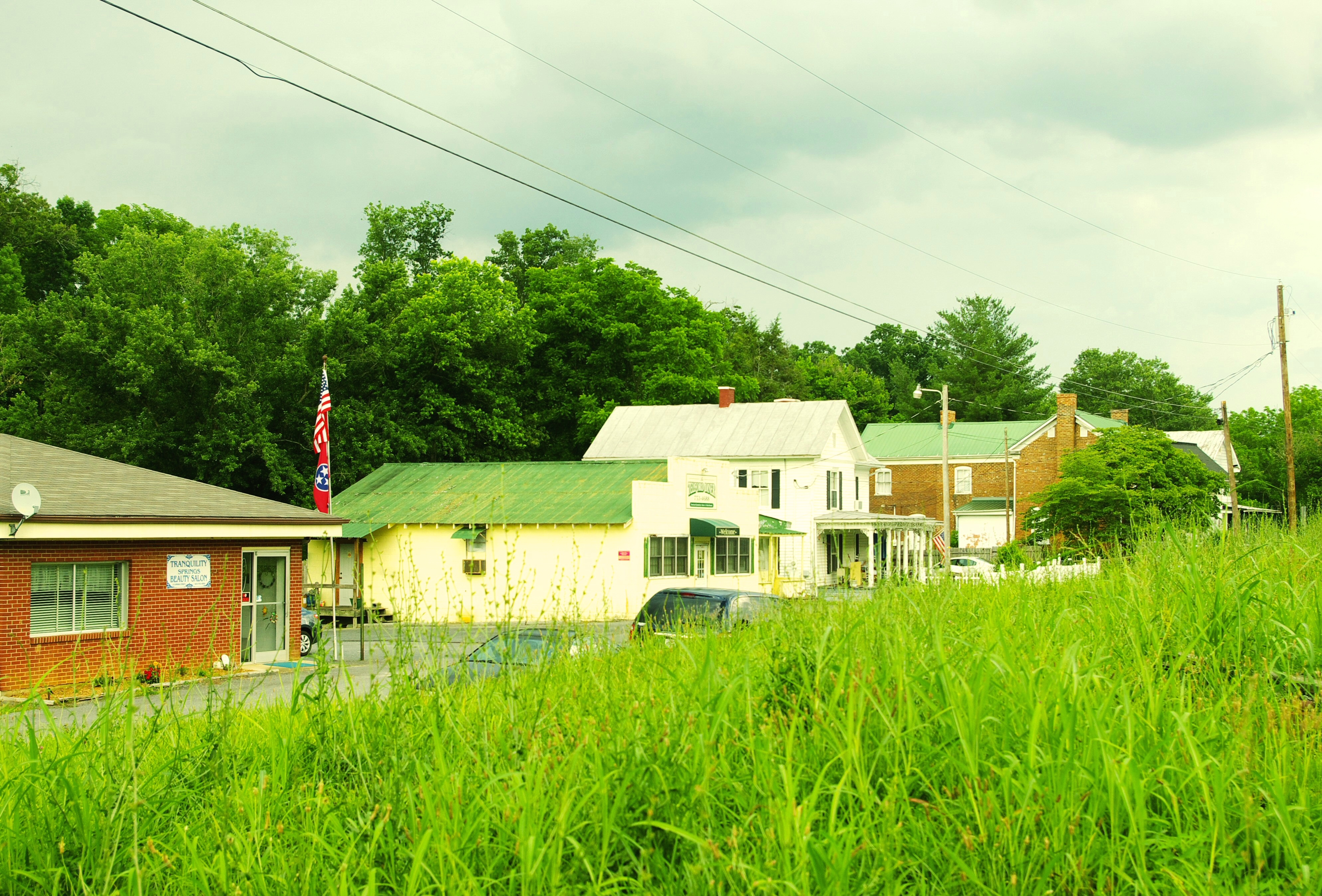
- Buildings along Mill Street

- Location within Tennessee
- Coordinates: 36°14′56″N 82°32′43″W
- Country: United States
- State: Tennessee
- County: Washington

Area
  - Total: 2.47 sq mi (6.39 km^{2})
  - Land: 2.47 sq mi (6.39 km^{2})
  - Water: 0 sq mi (0.00 km^{2})
- Elevation: 1,555 ft (474 m)

Population (2020)
  - Total: 909
  - Density: 368.4/sq mi (142.25/km^{2})
- Time zone: UTC-5 (Eastern (EST))
  - Summer (DST): UTC-4 (EDT)
- ZIP code: 37690
- Area code: 423
- GNIS feature ID: 1304034

Telford is a census-designated place and unincorporated community in Washington County, Tennessee, located between Jonesborough and Limestone. As of the 2010 census, it had a population of 921. The community is part of the Johnson City Metropolitan Statistical Area, which is a component of the Johnson City-Kingsport-Bristol, TN-VA Combined Statistical Area – commonly known as the "Tri-Cities" region. It has one school, Grandview Elementary.

== Demographics ==
Historical population
| Census | Pop. | Note | %± |
|---|---|---|---|
| 2020 | 909 | | — |
U.S. Decennial Census

== History ==
The community was called Millwood in early times and continued so for many years. It was not until 1855, when Colonel George Whitfield Telford, a state senator who operated the Telford Manufacturing Company, donated about four acres of land to support local operations of the East Tennessee and Virginia Railroad, that the name Millwood was changed to Telford Depot. At a date sometime after 1876 the word "Depot" was discontinued and the single name Telford adopted.

During the Civil War, citizens of this part of Washington County voted to secede from the Confederacy, but they were unsuccessful in persuading others to do so. The independent nation called "Bricker's Republic" soon fell into relative obscurity. A Civil War battle took place in Telford on September 8, 1863, when the 100th Ohio Infantry clashed with the Confederate-aligned Thomas' Legion just east of the depot. The Confederate force was supported by 4-Howitzer artillery unit commanded by General Alfred "Mudwall" Jackson.

== Postal service ==
Telford has a post office and zip code. (37690) The post office is located at 1888 Old State Route 34, Telford, Tennessee 37690.

== Education ==
It is in the Washington County School District.

== Notable people ==
- Eliza McCardle Johnson, First Lady of the United States, (April 15, 1865 – March 4, 1869)
- Tilly Walker, Major League Baseball player from 1911–23, member of 1916 World Series champion Boston Red Sox
