= Walnut Hill, Tennessee =

Walnut Hill
- CDP
- Location of Walnut Hill, Tennessee
- Coordinates: 36°34′17″N 82°15′28″W
- Country: United States
- State: Tennessee
- County: Sullivan

Area
  - Total: 4.10 sq mi (10.63 km^{2})
  - Land: 4.10 sq mi (10.63 km^{2})
  - Water: 0 sq mi (0.00 km^{2})
- Elevation: 1,610 ft (490 m)

Population (2020)
  - Total: 2,331
  - Density: 568.2/sq mi (219.37/km^{2})
- Time zone: UTC-5 (Eastern (EST))
  - Summer (DST): UTC-4 (EDT)
- FIPS code: 47-77900
- GNIS feature ID: 1273738

Walnut Hill is a census-designated place (CDP) in Sullivan County, Tennessee. The population was 2,394 at the 2010 census. It is part of the Kingsport-Bristol-Bristol, TN-VA Metropolitan Statistical Area, which is a component of the Johnson City-Kingsport-Bristol, TN-VA Combined Statistical Area, commonly known as the "Tri-Cities" region.

== Geography ==
Walnut Hill is located at 36°34′17″N 82°15′28″W (36.571440, -82.257832).

According to the United States Census Bureau, the CDP has a total area of 4.3 square miles (11 km^{2}), all of it land.

== Demographics ==
Historical population
Census	Pop.	Note	%±
2020	2,331		—
U.S. Decennial Census

As of the census of 2000, there were 2,756 people, 1,134 households, and 877 families residing in the CDP. The population density was 585.3 inhabitants per square mile (226.0/km^{2}). There were 1,176 housing units at an average density of 249.8 per square mile (96.4/km^{2}). The racial makeup of the CDP was 98.51% White, 0.51% African American, 0.25% Native American, 0.29% Asian, and 0.44% from two or more races. Hispanic or Latino of any race were 0.15% of the population.

There were 1,134 households, out of which 27.9% had children under the age of 18 living with them, 67.2% were married couples living together, 7.3% had a female householder with no husband present, and 22.6% were non-families. 20.0% of all households were made up of individuals, and 8.5% had someone living alone who was 65 years of age or older. The average household size was 2.43 and the average family size was 2.78.

In the CDP, the population was spread out, with 19.6% under the age of 18, 5.8% from 18 to 24, 27.6% from 25 to 44, 30.8% from 45 to 64, and 16.1% who were 65 years of age or older. The median age was 43 years. For every 100 females, there were 95.5 males. For every 100 females age 18 and over, there were 94.6 males.

The median income for a household in the CDP was $39,677, and the median income for a family was $45,242. Males had a median income of $30,969 versus $23,659 for females. The per capita income for the CDP was $21,286. About 8.7% of families and 8.5% of the population were below the poverty line, including 8.3% of those under age 18 and 13.3% of those age 65 or over.
