= Northeast State Community College =

Public community college in Blountville, Tennessee, U.S.

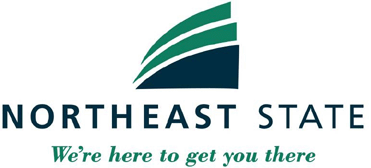
- College logo
- Motto: We're here to get you there
- Type: Public community college
- Established: 1966; 60 years ago
- Endowment: $12.5 million (2019)
- Chancellor: Flora W. Tydings
- President: Jeff McCord
- Vice-Chancellor: James Martin King
- Students: 6,446
- Location: Blountville, Tennessee, United States; 36.485°N 82.409°W
- Mascot: Bears
- Website: www.northeaststate.edu

Northeast State Community College is a public community college based in Blountville, Tennessee. It offers technical education and college transfer programs in Blountville and at teaching sites in Elizabethton, Gray, and Kingsport. The school enrolls more than 6,000 students.

Northeast State offers associate degrees in more than 130 programs of study, which can be transferred to a number of local and regional four-year colleges and universities. The school also offers associate of applied science degrees in more than 30 programs of study. In addition, Northeast State offers academic and technical certificates in more than a dozen areas of study.

== History ==
Northeast State began as Tri-Cities State Area Vocational-Technical School in 1966 under the governance of the State Board for Vocational Education. In 1970, the mission was expanded and the school became a regional center for vocational and technical training. The scope was again expanded in 1978 to include the awarding of both one-year certificates and associate degrees in technology, and the name was changed to Tri-Cities State Technical Institute. Effective on July 1, 1983, Tri-Cities State Tech was placed under the governance of the Tennessee State Board of Regents and became part of the State University and Community College System of Tennessee. On July 1, 1990, a university parallel component was added, and the current name was made official.

== Kingsport Academic Village ==
The Kingsport Academic Village is a 2nd campus located in Kingsport, Tennessee

=== The Regional Center for Health Professions ===
In recent years, Northeast State have moved their health profession programs to Kingsport, Tennessee including the college's two-year nursing program.

=== Kingsport Center for Higher Education ===
Just before Fall 2009, Northeast State opened the Kingsport Center for Higher Education. The KCHE is a 54,000-square-foot (5,000 m^{2}), $12 million project. This moved their current Kingsport classes to a new up to date building. This also created a distance learning facility for undergraduate and graduate programs from King University, Carson–Newman University, Lincoln Memorial University and University of Tennessee (all are private colleges located in Tennessee, except for University of Tennessee which is a public school).

=== The Regional Center for Advanced Manufacturing ===
The Regional Center for Advanced Manufacturing also opened in the Fall of 2009. It provides a training type facility for local business and industries to train employees who work in manufacturing jobs. It is also home to Northeast State's advanced manufacturing degree and certificate program.

== Campuses ==
- Blountville (Main Campus)
- Kingsport
- Elizabethton
- Johnson City – closed following Spring 2023 semester
- Bristol – closed following Fall 2017 semester
- Gray
