= Tri-Cities (Tennessee–Virginia) =

Region in Northeast Tennessee and Southwest Virginia

- Combined statistical area
- Johnson City–Kingsport–Bristol, TN–VA
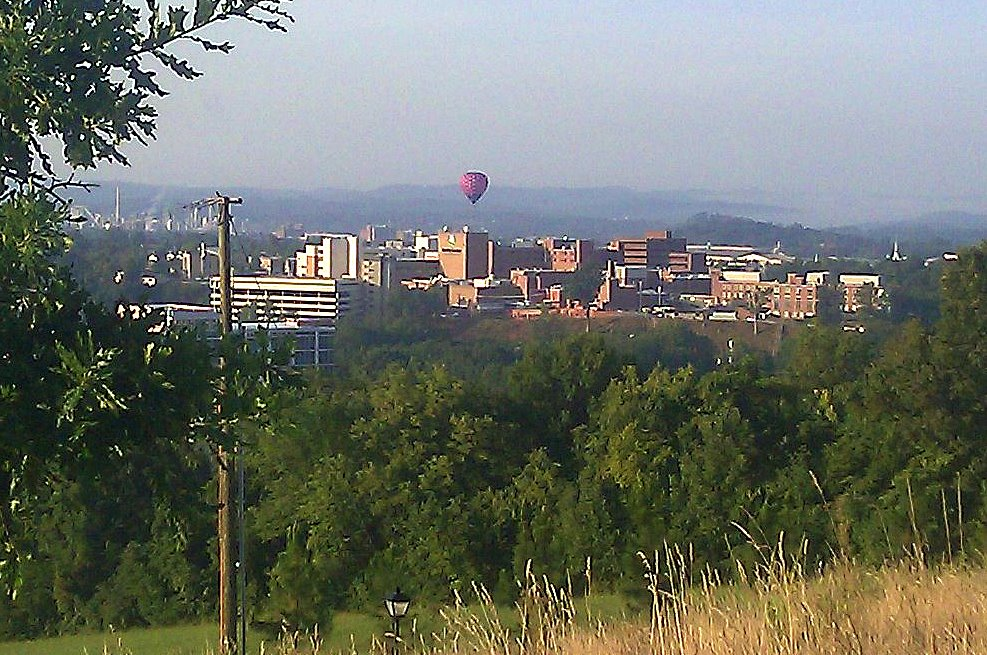
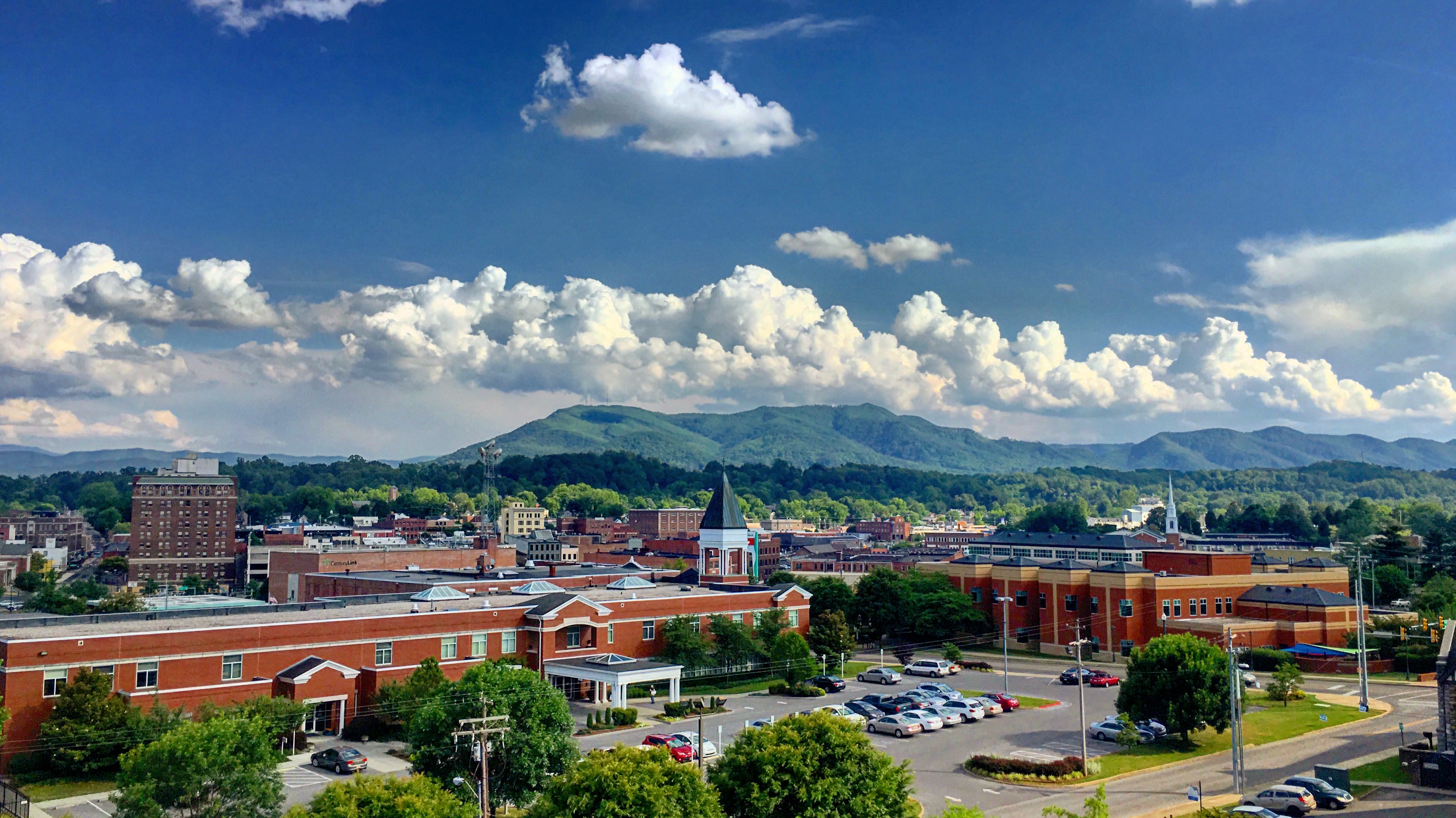
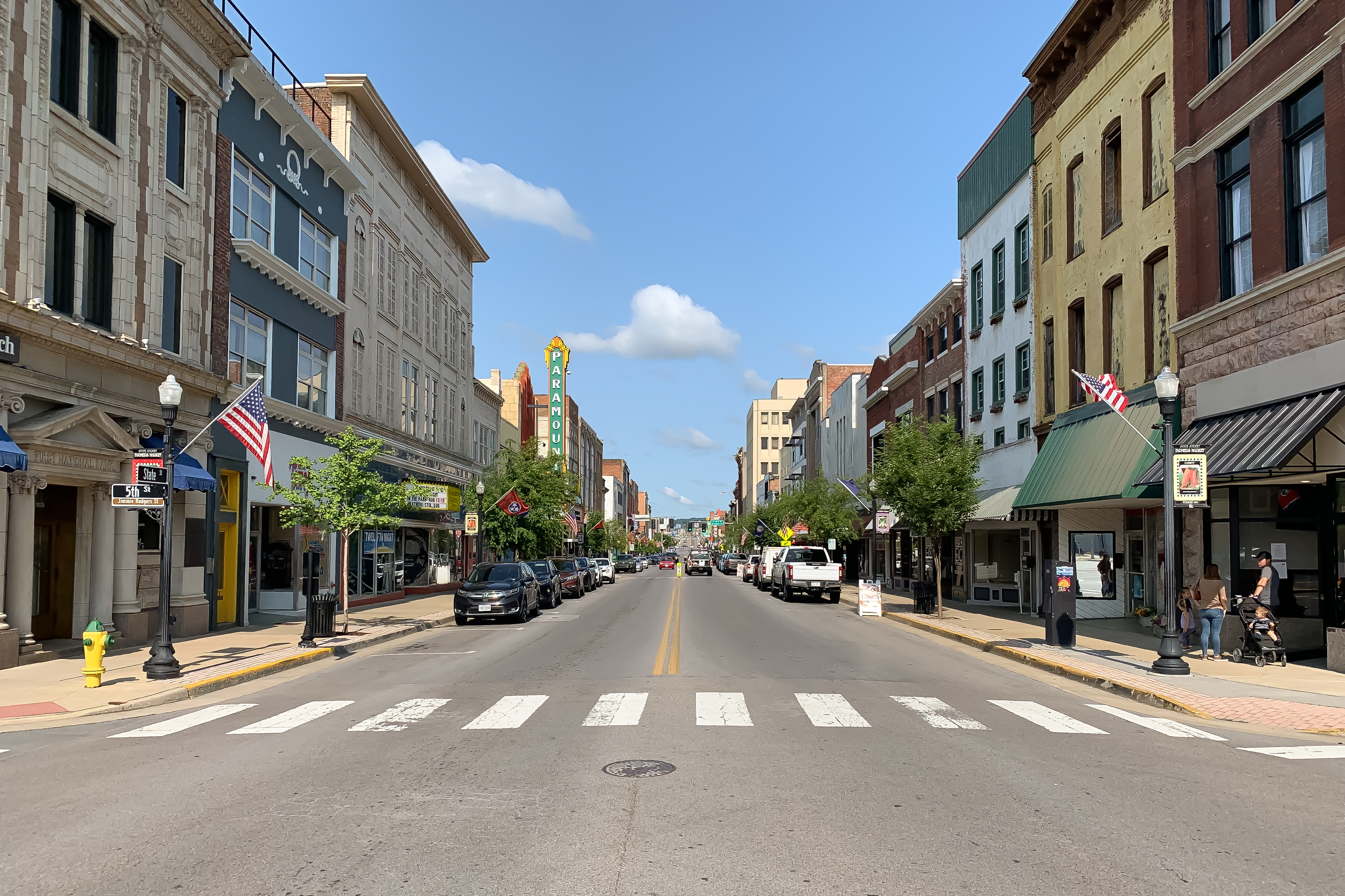
- Images, from top down, Kingsport skyline, Johnson City skyline, downtown Bristol, TN–VA
Johnson City–Kingsport–Bristol, TN–VA CSA
Kingsport–Bristol, TN–VA MSA
Johnson City, TN MSA
Greeneville, TN µSA
Kingsport, TN
Johnson City, TN
Bristol, TN and Bristol, VA
- Country: United States
- State: Tennessee; Virginia
- County: Tennessee: Carter County; Greene County; Hawkins County; Sullivan County; Unicoi County; Washington County; Virginia: Scott County; Washington County; City of Bristol (Independent City)

Population (2020)
  - Total: 514,899 (87th)
- Time zone: UTC−5 (EST)
  - Summer (DST): UTC−4 (EDT)

The Tri-Cities is the region comprising the cities of Kingsport, Johnson City, and Bristol and the surrounding smaller towns and communities in Northeast Tennessee and Southwest Virginia. All three cities are located in Northeast Tennessee, while Bristol has a twin city of the same name in Virginia.

The Tri-Cities region was formerly a single Metropolitan Statistical Area (MSA); due to the U.S. Census Bureau's revised definitions of urban areas in the early 2000s, it is now a Combined Statistical Area (CSA) with two metropolitan components: Johnson City and Kingsport–Bristol, TN–VA. At the 2020 Census, the CSA had a population of 585,041.

== Combined Statistical Area ==
=== Components ===
Tennessee

- Carter County
- Greene County
- Hawkins County
- Sullivan County
- Unicoi County
- Washington County

Virginia

- Scott County
- Washington County
- City of Bristol (Independent City)

=== Communities ===
==== Places with more than 50,000 inhabitants ====
- Johnson City, Tennessee (principal city)
- Kingsport, Tennessee (principal city)

==== Places with 10,000 to 50,000 inhabitants ====
- Bristol, Tennessee (principal city)
- Bristol, Virginia (principal city)
- Elizabethton, Tennessee
- Greeneville, Tennessee

==== Places with 1,000 to 10,000 inhabitants ====
- Abingdon, Virginia
- Banner Hill, Tennessee (CDP)
- Bean Station, Tennessee (partial)
- Bloomingdale, Tennessee (CDP)
- Blountville, Tennessee (CDP)
- Bluff City, Tennessee
- Central, Tennessee (CDP)
- Church Hill, Tennessee
- Colonial Heights, Tennessee (CDP)
- Emory, Virginia (CDP)
- Erwin, Tennessee
- Fall Branch, Tennessee (CDP)
- Gate City, Virginia
- Glade Spring, Virginia
- Gray, Tennessee (CDP)
- Hampton, Tennessee (CDP)
- Hunter, Tennessee (CDP)
- Jonesborough, Tennessee
- Mosheim, Tennessee
- Mountain City, Tennessee
- Mount Carmel, Tennessee
- Oak Grove, Tennessee (CDP)
- Pine Crest, Tennessee (CDP)
- Roan Mountain, Tennessee (CDP)
- Rogersville, Tennessee
- Saltville, Virginia (partial)
- Sneedville, Tennessee
- Spurgeon, Tennessee (CDP)
- Surgoinsville, Tennessee
- Tusculum, Tennessee
- Unicoi, Tennessee
- Walnut Hill, Tennessee (CDP)
- Weber City, Virginia

==== Places with fewer than 1,000 inhabitants ====
- Baileyton, Tennessee
- Bulls Gap, Tennessee
- Damascus, Virginia
- Embreeville, Tennessee (CDP)
- Clinchport, Virginia
- Duffield, Virginia
- Dungannon, Virginia
- Meadowview, Virginia (CDP)
- Mooresburg, Tennessee (CDP)
- Nickelsville, Virginia
- Telford, Tennessee (CDP)
- Watauga, Tennessee

==== Unincorporated places ====
- Afton, Tennessee
- Biltmore, Tennessee
- Bowmantown, Tennessee
- Boones Creek, Tennessee
- Camp Creek, Tennessee
- Clinchburg, Virginia
- Doeville, Tennessee
- Chuckey, Tennessee
- Eidson, Tennessee
- Fish Springs, Tennessee
- Flag Pond, Tennessee
- Fort Blackmore, Virginia
- Friendship, Virginia
- Fordtown, Tennessee
- Hayter's Gap, Virginia
- Hiltons, Virginia
- Indian Springs, Tennessee
- Konnarock, Virginia
- Kyles Ford, Tennessee
- Lamar, Tennessee
- Laurel Bloomery, Tennessee
- Leesburg, Tennessee
- Liberty Hill, Greene County, Tennessee
- Limestone, Tennessee
- Lodi, Virginia
- Maces Spring, Virginia
- McDonald, Greene County, Tennessee
- Mendota, Virginia
- Midway, Greene County, Tennessee
- Midway, Washington County, Tennessee
- Mohawk, Tennessee
- Newmansville, Tennessee
- Persia, Tennessee
- Piney Flats, Tennessee
- Rheatown, Tennessee
- Romeo, Tennessee
- Saint Clair, Tennessee
- Shady Valley, Tennessee
- South Central, Tennessee
- South Greene, Tennessee
- Stoney Creek, Tennessee
- Sullivan Gardens, Tennessee
- Sulphur Springs, Tennessee
- Swords Creek, Virginia
- Treadway, Tennessee
- Trade, Tennessee
- Valley Forge, Tennessee
- Yuma, Virginia

=== Demographics ===
As of the census of 2000, there were 480,091 people, 199,218 households, and 138,548 families residing within the CSA. The racial makeup of the CSA was 96.22% White, 2.12% African American, 0.20% Native American, 0.40% Asian, 0.02% Pacific Islander, 0.02% from other races, and 0.74% from two or more races. Hispanic or Latino of any race were 0.92% of the population.

The median income for a household in the CSA was $30,331, and the median income for a family was $37,254. Males had a median income of $29,561 versus $21,014 for females. The per capita income for the CSA was $16,923.

== Transportation ==
Interstate Highways I-26 and I-81 intersect in the region, while I-40, I-77, and I-75 are nearby. Tri-Cities Regional Airport (TRI) has non-stop service to Atlanta, Charlotte, Ft. Lauderdale, Orlando, and St. Petersburg/Clearwater. Airlines include Delta Air Lines, Delta Connection, Allegiant Air and American Eagle Airlines. Additionally, TRI manages an aggressive Air Cargo program, administers Foreign Trade Zone 204, supports and promotes U.S. Customs Port 2027, and provides trade development assistance. The Region has both CSX and Norfolk Southern mainline railway access.

=== Highways ===
==== Interstates ====
- I-26
- I-81

==== US Highways ====
- US 11
  - US 11E
    - US 11E Bus.
  - US 11W
- US 19
  - US 19E
  - US 19W
- US 23
  - US 23 Bus.
- US 58
  - US 58 Alt.
  - US 58 Bus.
- US 321
  - US 321 Truck
- US 421
  - US 421 Bus.

=== Airport ===
The region is served by the Tri-Cities Regional Airport which has scheduled airline passenger jet service.

== Education ==
=== Colleges and universities ===
- East Tennessee State University
- Emmanuel Christian Seminary
- Emory & Henry University
- King University
- Milligan College
- Northeast State Community College
- Tusculum University
- University of Virginia's College at Wise
- Virginia Intermont College (Closed May 2014)
- Virginia Highlands Community College
- Walters State Community College

The Kingsport Higher Education Center is a complex in downtown Kingsport, Tennessee that combines classes from five area colleges and universities, including The University of Tennessee.

== All-American City Award ==
The All-America City Award is given by the National Civic League annually to ten cities in the United States. In 1999, the Tri-Cities were collectively designated as an All-America City by the National Civic League.

The award is the oldest community recognition program in the nation and recognizes communities whose citizens work together to identify and tackle community-wide challenges and achieve uncommon results.

Since the program's inception in 1949, more than 4,000 communities have competed and over 500 have been named All-America Cities.

== Sister cities ==
The Greater Tri-Cities of Tennessee and Virginia has three sister cities, as designated by Sister Cities International:

- Guaranda, Ecuador
- Teterow, Germany
- Rybinsk, Russia

== See also ==
- Doe River
- Watauga River
- Watauga Lake
- South Holston Lake and River
- Nolichucky River
- Roan Mountain
- Bays Mountain
- Gray Fossil Site
- Bristol Motor Speedway
- Birthplace of Country Music
- PBS Appalachia Virginia
- WETP-TV
- WJHL-TV
- WCYB-TV
