= Mount Carmel, Tennessee =

City in Hawkins County, Tennessee, United States

Mount Carmel
- City
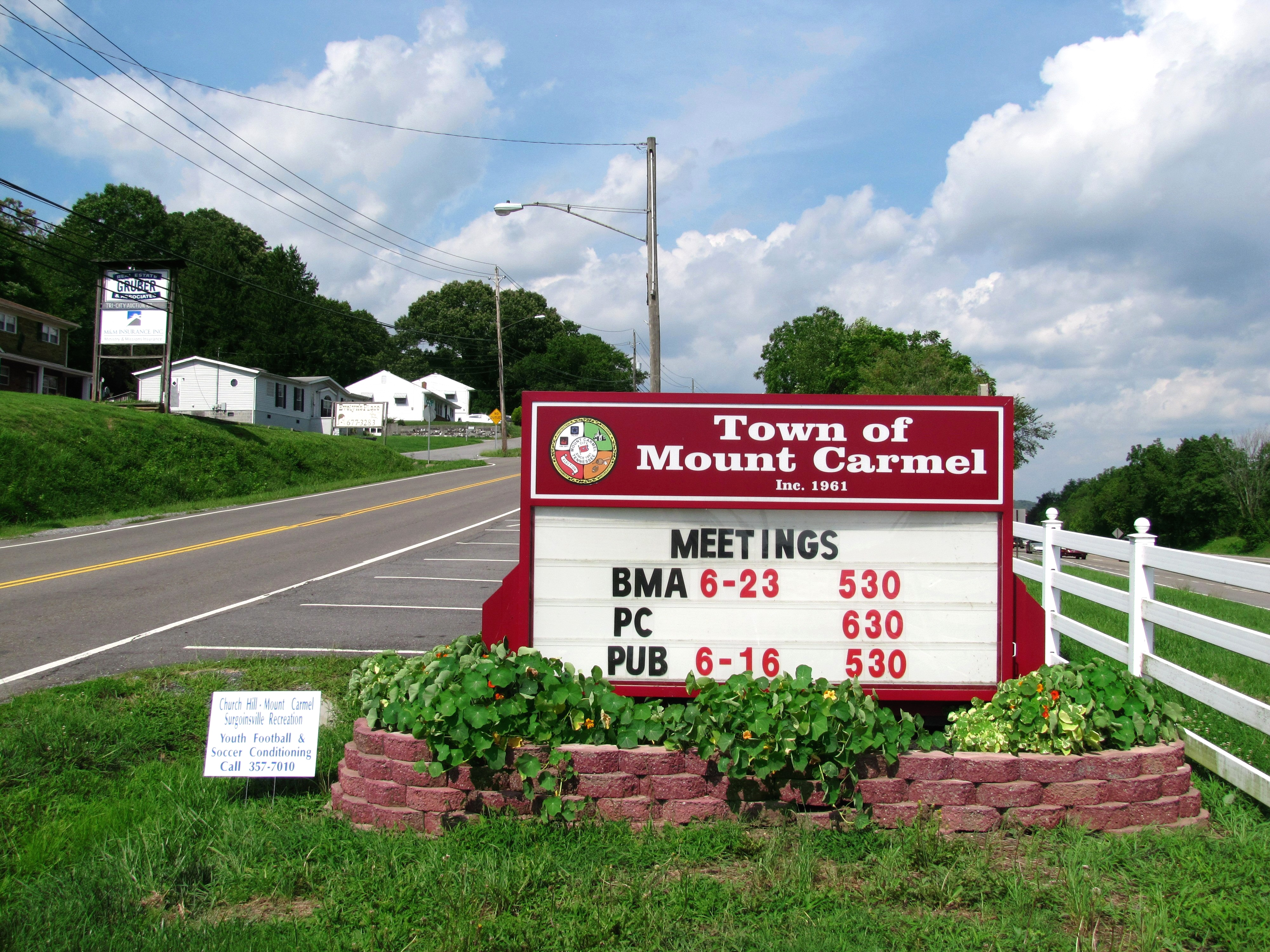
- Town (City) of Mount Carmel sign along Main Street

- Seal

- Location in Hawkins County, Tennessee
- Coordinates: 36°33′56″N 82°39′12″W
- Country: United States
- State: Tennessee
- County: Hawkins
- Incorporated: 1961

Government
  - Mayor: John Gibson
  - Town Administrator: Jim Stables

Area
  - Total: 6.65 sq mi (17.22 km^{2})
  - Land: 6.64 sq mi (17.21 km^{2})
  - Water: 0.0077 sq mi (0.02 km^{2})
- Elevation: 1,365 ft (416 m)

Population (2020)
  - Total: 5,473
  - Density: 824/sq mi (318.1/km^{2})
- Time zone: UTC-5 (Eastern (EST))
  - Summer (DST): UTC-4 (EDT)
- ZIP code: 37645
- Area code: 423
- FIPS code: 47-50580
- GNIS feature ID: 1294565
- Website: www.mountcarmeltn.gov

Mount Carmel is a city in Hawkins County, Tennessee, United States. As of the 2010 census, the population was 5,429, an increase of 634 since the 2000 census. It is part of the Kingsport-Bristol-Bristol, TN-VA Metropolitan Statistical Area, which is a component of the "Tri-Cities" region.

== History ==
Mount Carmel is in Hawkins County, which was once called Spencer county, and was a part of the State of Franklin. The State of Franklin comprised eight counties in western North Carolina in the late 1700s. Governed by John Sevier, it operated as an independent state for four years before it ultimately rejoined North Carolina.

Mount Carmel once garnered national attention in the mid-2000s because of a CBS News story stating the town's geography is situated on only one side of the main highway through the area. Since then, the city has secured property on the other side of the road and has built a cemetery.

Since the 1980s, the community has faced economic hardship due to political turmoil in its government operations, and the outsourcing of its retail and municipal services to neighboring Church Hill and Kingsport. In 2020, the city would begin discussions of connecting to either of the two cities' sewer systems following the Mount Carmel sewer plant going insolvent. Calls for Mount Carmel to merge into Kingsport or Church Hill have been raised since 2021 because of the financial instability.

== Geography ==
Mount Carmel is located in eastern Hawkins County at 36°33′56″N 82°39′12″W (36.565666, -82.653265). It is bordered to the east by the city of Kingsport and to the west by the city of Church Hill. U.S. Route 11W is the main highway through the town, leading east into Kingsport and southwest 22 miles (35 km) to Rogersville, the Hawkins county seat.

According to the United States Census Bureau, Mount Carmel has a total area of 6.9 square miles (18.0 km^{2}), of which 0.01 square miles (0.02 km^{2}), or 0.11%, are water.

== Demographics ==
Historical population
Census	Pop.	Note	%±
1970	2,821		—
1980	3,764		33.4%
1990	4,082		8.4%
2000	4,795		17.5%
2010	5,429		13.2%
2020	5,473		0.8%

=== 2020 census ===
Mount Carmel racial composition
Race	Number	Percentage
White (non-Hispanic)	5,181	94.66%
Black or African American (non-Hispanic)	45	0.82%
Native American	10	0.18%
Asian	18	0.33%
Pacific Islander	1	0.02%
Other/Mixed	141	2.58%
Hispanic or Latino	77	1.41%

As of the 2020 United States census, there were 5,473 people, 2,184 households, and 1,614 families residing in the town.

=== 2000 census ===
As of the census of 2000, there were 4,795 people, 1,935 households, and 1,499 families residing in the city. The population density was 701.5 inhabitants per square mile (270.9/km^{2}). There were 2,078 housing units at an average density of 304.0 per square mile (117.4/km^{2}). The racial makeup of the town was 98.27% White, 0.54% African American, 0.13% Native American, 0.15% Asian, 0.04% Pacific Islander, 0.23% from other races, and 0.65% from two or more races. Hispanic or Latino of any race were 0.58% of the population.

There were 1,935 households, out of which 31.9% had children under the age of 18 living with them, 67.1% were married couples living together, 8.2% had a female householder with no husband present, and 22.5% were non-families. 20.3% of all households were made up of individuals, and 8.2% had someone living alone who was 65 years of age or older. The average household size was 2.48 and the average family size was 2.84.

In the city, the population was spread out, with 22.2% under the age of 18, 6.7% from 18 to 24, 30.7% from 25 to 44, 28.4% from 45 to 64, and 12.0% who were 65 years of age or older. The median age was 38 years. For every 100 females, there were 92.6 males. For every 100 females age 18 and over, there were 94.1 males.

The median income for a household in the town was $36,599, and the median income for a family was $43,604. Males had a median income of $34,844 versus $24,340 for females. The per capita income for the city was $16,702. About 5.5% of families and 9.4% of the population were below the poverty line, including 16.0% of those under age 18 and 16.8% of those age 65 or over.

== Education ==
Mount Carmel has one school, Mount Carmel Elementary School, which provides teaching for pre-kindergarten through 4th grade children. The school is part of the Hawkins County School District. Children in fifth and sixth grade attend Church Hill Intermediate School. Seventh and Eighth graders attend Church Hill Middle School. High school students attend Volunteer Comprehensive High School.

== Parks and recreation ==
The Parks and Recreation department is a joint effort between the City of Mount Carmel with fellow Hawkins County cities of Church Hill and Surgoinsville.
