= Spurgeon, Tennessee =

Spurgeon
- CDP
- Location of Spurgeon, Tennessee
- Coordinates: 36°26′36″N 82°27′41″W
- Country: United States
- State: Tennessee
- Counties: Washington, Sullivan

Area
  - Total: 4.19 sq mi (10.86 km^{2})
  - Land: 4.09 sq mi (10.59 km^{2})
  - Water: 0.11 sq mi (0.28 km^{2})
- Elevation: 1,414 ft (431 m)

Population (2020)
  - Total: 3,978
  - Density: 973.3/sq mi (375.78/km^{2})
- Time zone: UTC-5 (Eastern (EST))
  - Summer (DST): UTC-4 (EDT)
- Zip codes: 37615 & 37663
- FIPS code: 47-70680
- GNIS feature ID: 1271165

Spurgeon is a census-designated place (CDP) in Sullivan and Washington counties in the U.S. state of Tennessee. The population was 3,957 at the 2010 census.

The Washington County portion of Spurgeon is part of the Johnson City Metropolitan Statistical Area, while the Sullivan County portion is part of the Kingsport-Bristol-Bristol, TN-VA Metropolitan Statistical Area. Those two metropolitan areas are components of the larger Johnson City-Kingsport-Bristol, TN-VA Combined Statistical Area – commonly known as the "Tri-Cities" region. During the American Civil War, a small conflict known as the Battle of Spurgeon's Mill happened here.

== Geography ==
Spurgeon is located at 36°26′36″N 82°27′41″W (36.443236, -82.461335).

According to the United States Census Bureau, the CDP has a total area of 4.2 square miles (10.9 km^{2}), of which 4.1 square miles (10.6 km^{2}) is land and 0.1 square mile (0.3 km^{2}) (2.38%) is water.

== Demographics ==
Historical population
Census	Pop.	Note	%±
2000	3,460		—
2010	3,957		14.4%
2020	3,978		0.5%
U.S. Decennial Census

=== 2020 census ===
As of the 2020 census, Spurgeon had a population of 3,978. The median age was 42.6 years. 18.6% of residents were under the age of 18 and 19.5% of residents were 65 years of age or older. For every 100 females there were 93.0 males, and for every 100 females age 18 and over there were 89.9 males age 18 and over.

93.8% of residents lived in urban areas, while 6.2% lived in rural areas.

There were 1,789 households in Spurgeon, of which 23.4% had children under the age of 18 living in them. Of all households, 44.8% were married-couple households, 20.6% were households with a male householder and no spouse or partner present, and 27.8% were households with a female householder and no spouse or partner present. About 32.0% of all households were made up of individuals and 13.0% had someone living alone who was 65 years of age or older.

There were 1,932 housing units, of which 7.4% were vacant. The homeowner vacancy rate was 0.9% and the rental vacancy rate was 10.6%.

Racial composition as of the 2020 census
Race	Number	Percent
White	3,679	92.5%
Black or African American	53	1.3%
American Indian and Alaska Native	13	0.3%
Asian	22	0.6%
Native Hawaiian and Other Pacific Islander	1	0.0%
Some other race	50	1.3%
Two or more races	160	4.0%
Hispanic or Latino (of any race)	105	2.6%

=== 2000 census ===
As of the census of 2000, there were 3,460 people, 1,425 households, and 1,061 families residing in the CDP. The population density was 840.9 inhabitants per square mile (324.7/km^{2}). There were 1,502 housing units at an average density of 365.0 per square mile (140.9/km^{2}). The racial makeup of the CDP was 97.98% White, 0.55% African American, 0.20% Native American, 0.17% Asian, 0.06% Pacific Islander, 0.06% from other races, and 0.98% from two or more races. Hispanic or Latino of any race were 0.52% of the population.

There were 1,425 households, out of which 31.4% had children under the age of 18 living with them, 61.0% were married couples living together, 10.5% had a female householder with no husband present, and 25.5% were non-families. 21.8% of all households were made up of individuals, and 6.0% had someone living alone who was 65 years of age or older. The average household size was 2.42 and the average family size was 2.81.

In the CDP, the population was spread out, with 22.3% under the age of 18, 8.4% from 18 to 24, 32.0% from 25 to 44, 26.0% from 45 to 64, and 11.4% who were 65 years of age or older. The median age was 37 years. For every 100 females, there were 97.6 males. For every 100 females age 18 and over, there were 92.2 males.

The median income for a household in the CDP was $34,316, and the median income for a family was $41,899. Males had a median income of $30,512 versus $21,703 for females. The per capita income for the CDP was $17,004. About 8.5% of families and 11.2% of the population were below the poverty line, including 14.1% of those under age 18 and 5.2% of those age 65 or over.

== Education ==
The portion in Washington County is in the Washington County School District.

The portion in Sullivan County is in the Sullivan County School District.
