= Oak Grove, Washington County, Tennessee =

Oak Grove
- CDP
- Location of Oak Grove, Tennessee
- Coordinates: 36°25′16″N 82°25′35″W
- Country: United States
- State: Tennessee
- County: Washington

Area
  - Total: 5.26 sq mi (13.63 km^{2})
  - Land: 4.53 sq mi (11.74 km^{2})
  - Water: 0.73 sq mi (1.90 km^{2})
- Elevation: 1,404 ft (428 m)

Population (2020)
  - Total: 4,482
  - Density: 989.2/sq mi (381.92/km^{2})
- Time zone: UTC-5 (Eastern (EST))
  - Summer (DST): UTC-4 (EDT)
- FIPS code: 47-54700
- GNIS feature ID: 1296059

Oak Grove is a census-designated place (CDP) in Washington County, Tennessee, United States. The population was 4,425 at the 2010 census. It is part of the Johnson City Metropolitan Statistical Area, which is a component of the Johnson City–Kingsport–Bristol, TN-VA Combined Statistical Area – commonly known as the "Tri-Cities" region.

== Geography ==
Oak Grove is located at 36°25′16″N 82°25′35″W.

According to the United States Census Bureau, the CDP has a total area of 5.3 square miles (14 km^{2}), of which 4.5 square miles (12 km^{2}) of it is land and 0.8 square miles (2.1 km^{2}) of it (14.84%) is water.

== Demographics ==
Historical population
Census	Pop.	Note	%±
2020	4,425		—
U.S. Decennial Census

As of the census of 2000, there were 4,072 people, 1,697 households, and 1,126 families residing in the CDP. The population density was 879.1 inhabitants per square mile (339.4/km^{2}). There were 1,870 housing units at an average density of 403.7 per square mile (155.9/km^{2}). The racial makeup of the CDP was 97.86% White, 0.81% African American, 0.42% Native American, 0.20% Asian, 0.15% from other races, and 0.56% from two or more races. Hispanic or Latino of any race were 0.81% of the population.

There were 1,697 households, out of which 28.8% had children under the age of 18 living with them, 52.3% were married couples living together, 10.3% had a female householder with no husband present, and 33.6% were non-families. 25.9% of all households were made up of individuals, and 4.9% had someone living alone who was 65 years of age or older. The average household size was 2.32 and the average family size was 2.79.

In the CDP, the population was spread out, with 20.9% under the age of 18, 9.9% from 18 to 24, 36.0% from 25 to 44, 22.6% from 45 to 64, and 10.7% who were 65 years of age or older. The median age was 34 years. For every 100 females, there were 98.1 males. For every 100 females age 18 and over, there were 95.7 males.

The median income for a household in the CDP was $34,926, and the median income for a family was $42,518. Males had a median income of $32,332 versus $21,692 for females. The per capita income for the CDP was $19,630. About 9.7% of families and 14.8% of the population were below the poverty line, including 24.1% of those under age 18 and 14.6% of those age 65 or over.

== Education ==
It is in the Washington County School District.
