= Gray, Tennessee =

Gray
- CDP
- Location of Gray, Tennessee
- Coordinates: 36°25′3″N 82°28′32″W
- Country: United States
- State: Tennessee
- County: Washington

Area
  - Total: 1.49 sq mi (3.86 km^{2})
  - Land: 1.49 sq mi (3.85 km^{2})
  - Water: 0.0039 sq mi (0.01 km^{2})
- Elevation: 1,570 ft (480 m)

Population (2020)
  - Total: 1,293
  - Density: 870.1/sq mi (335.95/km^{2})
- Time zone: UTC-5 (Eastern (EST))
  - Summer (DST): UTC-4 (EDT)
- ZIP code: 37615
- Area code: 423
- FIPS code: 47-30700
- GNIS feature ID: 1285984

Gray is a census-designated place (CDP) in Washington County, Tennessee, United States and a suburb of Johnson City. It is part of the Johnson City Metropolitan Statistical Area, which is a component of the Johnson City–Kingsport–Bristol, TN-VA Combined Statistical Area – commonly known as the "Tri-Cities" region. The population was 1,222 at the 2010 census.

Gray lies just outside the junction between Interstate 81 and Interstate 26, the latter of which runs directly through the town. The town was founded as Gray Station, Tennessee, as it mainly served as a railway depot; the place became Gray in preferred usage. The Gray area consisted primarily of rural farmland until the 1990s, when some suburban areas began to take shape. Since 2000, the Gray area has gradually grown, with the addition of new chain restaurants and stores. A museum connected to the Gray Fossil Site, an early Pliocene Lagerstätte discovered during road construction in 2000, opened in 2007. Some of the area of Gray has been annexed by Johnson City.

== Education ==
It is in the Washington County School District.

Since Gray's only public elementary school, Gray Elementary, was becoming overpopulated, a new school, Ridgeview Elementary, was completed in 2008. Gray Elementary School had a population of 1000+ children in 2008; after Ridgeview opened, each school had a population of 600+ children. Gray's only high school is Daniel Boone High School.

== Geography ==
Gray is located at 36°25′3″N 82°28′32″W (36.417403, -82.475637).

According to the United States Census Bureau, the CDP has a total area of 1.5 square miles (3.9 km^{2}), of which 99.67% is land and 0.33% is water.

== Demographics ==
Historical population
Census	Pop.	Note	%±
2020	1,293		—
U.S. Decennial Census

As of the census of 2000, there were 1,273 people, 553 households, and 397 families residing in the CDP. The population density was 758.7 inhabitants per square mile (292.9/km^{2}). There were 586 housing units at an average density of 349.2 per square mile (134.8/km^{2}). The racial makeup of the CDP was 98.35% White, 0.55% African American, 0.24% Native American, 0.31% Asian, 0.39% from other races, and 0.16% from two or more races. Hispanic or Latino of any race were 0.63% of the population.

There were 553 households, of which 30.0% had children under the age of 18, 57.3% were married couples living together, 12.1% had a female householder with no husband present, and 28.2% were non-families. 24.2% of all households were made up of individuals, and 8.7% had someone living alone who was 65 years of age or older. The average household size was 2.30 and the average family size was 2.73.

In the CDP, the population was spread out, with 21.6% under the age of 18, 7.9% from 18 to 24, 31.2% from 25 to 44, 23.5% from 45 to 64, and 15.9% who were 65 years of age or older. The median age was 38 years. For every 100 females, there were 87.5 males. For every 100 females age 18 and over, there were 86.5 males.

The median income for a household in the CDP was $30,469, and the median income for a family was $40,473. Males had a median income of $28,333 versus $18,750 for females. The per capita income for the CDP was $22,542. About 13.2% of families and 14.3% of the population were below the poverty line, including 27.0% of those under age 18 and 12.3% of those age 65 or over.

== See also ==
- Gray Fossil Site
