= K. C. Thunder =

American professional wrestler

Personal information
- Born: Kasey Geyer; August 31, 1965 (age 60) Huntington, Indiana, U.S.

Professional wrestling career
- Ring name(s): K. C. Thunder; Kasey Thunder; Casey Thunder; Double Iron Sheik #1; Kasey Geyer
- Billed height: 6 ft 0 in (183 cm)
- Billed weight: 265 lb (120 kg)
- Billed from: Cocoa Beach, Florida
- Trained by: Nelson Royal; Al Snow; Dan Severn
- Debut: July 7, 1989

Kasey Geyer (born August 31, 1965), also known by the ring name K. C. Thunder, is an American semi-retired professional wrestler, promoter and trainer. He was one of the top "heel" performers in the Southern United States during the 1990s. Geyer is perhaps best known for his tenure in Southern States Wrestling where he is a former SSW Heavyweight Champion and a five-time SSW Tag Team Champion with real-life cousins Beau James and Steve Flynn. He was also a member of Count Grog's stable "The Brotherhood" in Southern Championship Wrestling and was the promotion's first-ever SCW North Carolina Champion.

He also had a notable career in the Midwestern United States during the mid-to-late 1990s. Geyer wrestled for Al Snow's Global Wrestling Alliance promotion in Lima, Ohio, from 1996 to 1998. He eventually became of one of the GWA's biggest stars and was among its last heavyweight champions before the company folded. Additionally, Geyer was part of The Wild Bunch with "Machine Gun" Mike Kelly and together won the tag team championship in the Northern States Wrestling Alliance during this period.

From 2001 to 2002, Geyer and Shawn Hernandez wrestled as The Double Iron Sheiks in All Japan Pro Wrestling. An alumnus of Smoky Mountain Wrestling, Geyer appeared for NWA Smoky Mountain Wrestling in the mid-2000s. In 2008, Geyer and Eddie Golden teamed as the fourth incarnation of The Heavenly Bodies. Geyer also operated the short-lived Smoky Mountain Championship Wrestling where he and Bobby Eaton trained several wrestlers.

== Professional wrestling career ==
=== Early career ===
K. C. Thunder was trained by Nelson Royal, a former NWA World Junior Heavyweight Champion, before making his pro debut in 1989. In 1992, Thunder formed The Beach Patrol with Terry Austin in the South Eastern Wrestling Alliance. On April 14, 1992, the team defeated The Terminators for the SEWA Tag Team Championship in Waynesville, North Carolina. They held the belts for two months before dropping them to Drs. X in Shelby, North Carolina. He also worked for the Carolina Championship Wrestling Alliance. Thunder was defeated by Khan the Warlord in a tournament final in Kernersville, North Carolina, on August 23, 1992, for the then vacant CCWA Heavyweight Championship.

On May 24, 1995, Thunder defeated Buddy Landel in Asheville, North Carolina, to become the Great American Wrestling Federation's inaugural heavyweight champion. On October 14, he wrestled Robert Gibson at a Smoky Mountain Wrestling show at Defiance High School. He later won the battle royal main event later that night. On April 20, 1996, The Beach Patrol defeated The Carolina Connection in Murphy, North Carolina, for the vacant SEWA Tag Team titles. Their second and last title reign lasted until mid-summer when they lost the belts to The Carolina Stud Stable (Carolina Heartbreaker and Carolina Heartthrob) in Waynesville. The two appeared together as pro wrestlers in the television film Angel with a Kick. Later that year, Thunder defeated Danny Christian for the SSW Heavyweight Championship in Fall Branch, Tennessee.

=== Midwestern independents ===
Thunder also spent three years wrestling for Al Snow's Global Wrestling Alliance promotion in Lima, Ohio. He received additional training from Snow and Dan Severn at the Bodyslammers Gym. Thunder eventually became one of their top "heel" performers and won the promotion's heavyweight title during its final year in operation. While in the Midwest, Thunder teamed with "Machine Gun" Mike Kelly as The New Reformed Wild Bunch. Kelly had previously teamed with Al Snow as the original version of The Wild Bunch. On September 26, 1997, Thunder and Kelly won the NSWA Tag Team Championship from The Heatbreakers (Otis Apollo and Johnny Paradise) in Westland, Michigan. They held on to the championship for over three months before their defeat by Rhythm and Blues (The Honky Tonk Man and Greg "The Hammer" Valentine) the following year. That same year, Thunder and Paradise (as Johnny Swinger) also appeared on WCW Pro against Bobby Walker and Jim Powers.

=== Southern Championship Wrestling ===
Thunder became a member of "The Brotherhood" under Count Grog upon joining Southern Championship Wrestling. He was billed as "the best dancer in SCW". On February 22, 1997, Thunder defeated Big Slam in a tournament final to become the inaugural SCW North Carolina Champion. He remained champion for nearly a year, defending the title against challengers such as "Ruthless" Roger Anderson, before being deposed by ex-Brotherhood member Boris Dragoff in Louisburg, North Carolina, on November 22, 1997. Grog later called Thunder one of his favorite top ten wrestlers to manage. Thunder also feuded with his former tag team partner "Iceman" Chris Cannon.

=== Southern States Wrestling ===
By the end of the 1990s, Thunder had emerged as one of the most hated "heels" on the Southern independent circuit. His in-ring persona was a vain and arrogant "pretty boy" from Cocoa Beach, Florida. According to Pro Wrestling Illustrated, he owned "more than 200 pairs of muti-colored tights".

In the fall of 1997, Thunder formed The Legends with real-life cousin Beau James in Southern States Wrestling. He and James later became members of The Family, a heel stable also including Steve Flynn and manager P.J. Sharp. They battled The Batten Twins (Bart and Brad Batten) in a Steel Cage match during this time. On October 18, The Legends defeated Death & Destruction (Frank "The Tank" Parker and "Ruthless" Roger Anderson) for the SSW Tag Team Championship in Mountain City, Tennessee. Thunder and James were champions for two month before losing the belts back to Death & Destruction in Fall Branch on December 19, 1997. Thunder also feuded with Chris Walker and Danny Christian.

On July 10, 1999, Thunder and Steve Flynn won the SSW Tag Team Championship from The Christian Brothers (Bam Bam and Danny Christian) in a three-way match also involving Death & Destruction. The title was declared vacant on September 18, 1999, following "a wild brawl" at the Big Orange Brawl in Kingsport, Tennessee, between Flynn and Beau James (substituting for Thunder) and Death & Destruction. That same day, Thunder wrestled Frenchy Riviera for an NWA Wildside television taping in Cornelia, Georgia.

=== Independent circuit ===
In early-2000, Thunder made a brief return to the Midwest where he held Championship International Wrestling's United States Heavyweight title. In March 2000, Thunder lost the U.S. title to Andy Chene in Adrian, Michigan. A month later, Thunder made his first trip to Japan where he wrestled former mixed martial artist Kohei Sato at Korakuen Hall. This was part of a "Japan vs. USA" event promoted by Nick Bockwinkel and Yoshiaki Fujiwara's shoot-style Japan Pro Wrestling Association.

=== Southern States Wrestling ===
On March 9, 2000, Thunder and James lost to Ricky Harrison and The Iron Cross in Saltville, Virginia, in a match for the SSW Tag Team Championship. He had been a last-minute replacement for co-tag team champion Buddy Landel. At the first annual Mark Curtis Memorial Weekend of Champions, The Family defeated Harrison and The Iron Cross in a Loser Leaves SSW match. James and Thunder won the match after special guest referee PJ Sharpe, their former manager, "turned heel" by hitting Harrison with a briefcase from behind and making a fast count. The Legends regained the tag team belts from Harrison and Iron Cross in Kingsport on September 13. That same month, Nationwide Championship Wrestling "invaded" Southern States Wrestling. Thunder and James, the two most hated wrestlers in SSW, unexpectedly stepped up to challenge the outsiders. On October 1, The Legends lost the tag team belts to NCW's Something Else (Eddie Browning and John Noble) in Kingsport. At Thanksgiving Night 2000, they wrestled Something Else in a falls count anywhere match. Thunder and James regained the tag team championship a fourth time after defeating Something Else on January 26, 2001. The Legends feuded with the returning Batten Twins over the SSW Tag Team Championship for most of the year. They lost the belts to the Battens on March 20. They received a rematch in a Steel Cage at the Mark Curtis Memorial Weekend of Champions (2001). Thunder and James lost the match due to outside interference from Scotty Ace and Ricky Harrison. Due to the pre-match stipulation, the losers were forced to leave the promotion for a period of time. Thunder sought revenge for his cousin's exile from SSW and battled Ricky Harrison over the heavyweight title.

Thunder and James reunited in Ohio's Nationwide Wrestling, and occasionally wrestled in the Carolinas, before eventually returning to SSW to resume their feud with the Batten Twins. On September 6, the team unsuccessfully challenged the Battens in a no-disqualification, no time-limit match for the tag team titles at the Kingsport Civic Auditorium. On October 13, The Family (Thunder, Beau James, Steve Flynn and manager PJ Sharp) defeated The Batten Twins and their allies Ricky Harrison and Scotty Ace in an 8-man tag team match. Thunder and Steve Flynn won the belts from the Batten Twins two weeks later. Thunder and Flynn began feuding with Beau James in early-2002. They lost the tag team belts to James and Brian Overbay on July 17, 2002. Roger Anderson of Death & Destruction filled in as a substitute for Flynn.

=== All-Japan Pro Wrestling ===
From 2001 to 2002, Thunder toured Japan with All-Japan Pro Wrestling. He competed both under his real name and as "Double Iron Sheik #1" with Shawn Hernandez as The Double Iron Sheiks. In AJPW's "2001 Summer Action Series", Thunder teamed with Hernandez and other "gaijin" wrestlers to face such teams as "Dr. Death" Steve Williams and "Jungle" Jim Steele, Jinsei Shinzaki and Yuto Aijima, and Genichiro Tenryu and Nobutaka Araya. On July 14, 2001, Thunder and Hernandez partnered with George Hines to defeat Yoshiaki Fujiwara, Yuto Aijima and Ryuji Hijikata at the Nippon Budokan. Thunder and Hernandez returned to Japan in February 2002 for AJPW's "Excite Series". As The Double Iron Sheiks, they scored victories over the teams of Masato Tanaka and Tomoaki Honma, Nobutaka Araya and Kazushi Miyamoto, and Shigeo Okumura and Ryuji Hijikata. On February 20, The Double Iron Sheiks and Gran Naniwa lost to Mike Barton, Jim Steele and George Hines at the Worker's Sports Center in Iida, Nagano. The following night, the team joined Hines in a 6-man tag team match against Genichiro Tenryu, Arashi and Nobukazu Hirai in Narita, Chiba. On February 24, 2002, Thunder and Hernandez were defeated by Masato Tanaka and Hideki Hosaka at the Nippon Budokan.

=== Independent circuit ===
Thunder returned to Southern States Wrestling for the Mark Curtis Memorial Weekend of Champions (2003) to team with Beau James (with The Duke) against The Stud Stable (Robert Fuller and Jimmy Golden) in the main event. On December 12, 2003, Thunder wrestled Ricky Morton for a North American Championship Wrestling television taping in Wilmington, North Carolina. He also wrestled Bad Brad Hunter at East Lincoln High School the following night. Both were main event bouts and subsequently aired on CSS Sports Southeast and WHKY-TV.

On February 6, 2004, Thunder and Tony Platinum wrestled Deion Johnson and Black Angel for the NACW Tag Championship. On March 13, Thunder wrestled Jimmy Golden at NACW's "Retribution" supercard in Morristown, Tennessee. In one of his last NACW appearances, Thunder took on Tim Horner for the NACW TV Championship. On July 17, 2004, Thunder appeared for Iron Ring Wrestling, as part of Kingsport's annual Funfest, where he wrestled Tony Atlas on the undercard. He also made appearances for American Pro Wrestling and Palmetto Pride Championship Wrestling during the next several months. Thunder also reunited with Beau James as The First Family in Championship Wrestling where they held the Triple Crown Tag Team Championship.

On May 7, 2005, Thunder (with The Duke of New York) wrestled Eddie Golden at the Mark Curtis Memorial Reunion. He initially won the bout after hitting Golden with a pair of brass knuckles while the referee was distracted. The match was restarted when a second official informed the referee what had occurred and Thunder was disqualified when a search revealed the foreign object. He made several return appearances in Iron Ring Wrestling later that year. Thunder and Tom Prichard lost to Ricky Morton and Bad Brad Thomas at an IRW show that summer. Thunder defeated The Barbarian four months later.

On February 2, 2006, Thunder teamed up with James Storm and David Young to wrestle Tracy Smothers, Bobby Houston and Lance Stark at the Ricky Morton Benefit Show. Thunder also worked for Great Southern Championship Wrestling and USA Main Event that year. After teaming together in Iron Ring Wrestling, Thunder returned with Beau James to SSW. On November 23, 2006, Thunder and James teamed with Tony Givens to beat Adam York, Ryan Dookie and Thorn at "Thanksgiving Night Spectacular 2006". Ray Idol was the special guest referee. Thunder and The Beautiful Blondes (Eddie Golden and Stan Lee) were defeated by Jerry Lawler, Bobby Houston and The Iron Cross at an All Star Wrestling show on June 2, 2007. In February 2008, Thunder and Wayen Adkins wrestled Eddie and Jimmy Golden (with Stan Lee) at the SSW 17th Anniversary Show. Thunder faced his former partner three months later at SSW's "A Night To Remember" in a match for the SSW Young Guns Television Championship.

=== The Heavenly Bodies ===
Eddie Golden and K. C. Thunder, former rivals in Southern States Wrestling, teamed together as The Heavenly Bodies throughout the Southeastern United States during 2008. They were occasionally accompanied by their valet Dawn Renea. Although short-lived compared to the prior incarnations, they won the tag team titles in the New Frontier Wrestling Association and challenged the tag champions in NWA All-Star Wrestling. In one of their last matches together, they wrestled The Iron Cross and Stan Lee in a Texas Tornado death match at middle school fundraiser in Lebanon, Virginia. According to the pre-match stipulation, The Heavenly Bodies' valet Dawn Renae would have her head shaved if the team failed to win the belts.

=== Independent circuit ===
In October 2008, Thunder challenged Wayne Adkins at SSW's "Fall Spectacular" for the SSW Heavyweight Championship. That same night, he teamed with AWA Superstars Heavyweight Champion Brian Logan in a tag team match against Beau James and Tony Givens. Thunder won the title from Adkins at SSW's "Thanksgiving Night 2008" on November 27, 2008. The championship was vacated the following month. In July 2009, Thunder defeated Jay Batista at an Iron Ring Wrestling show in Kingsport, Tennessee.

== Semi-retirement ==
In the early-2010s, Thunder promoted Smoky Mountain Championship Wrestling based in Weaverville, North Carolina. A veteran of the original Smoky Mountain Wrestling promotion, he had attempted to purchase the rights to the name from music producer Rick Rubin. Rubin reportedly wanted $400,000 and Thunder decided to turn down the offer. In addition to promoting, he was also involved in running training sessions with Bobby Eaton. In December 2012, Thunder and Stan Lee wrestled Deion Johnson and Diandre Jones as part of an anti-bullying event. Thunder wrestled Ricky Morton at SSW's "Christmas Night Star Wars 2012". He later brought Morton into Smoky Mountain for its debut in Cherokee, North Carolina. Morton, despite suffering a calf injury at a Mid-Atlantic Championship Wrestling show the previous night, wrestled in a six-man tag against Thunder, Beau James and Stan Lee.

On June 16, 2013, Thunder and Cerebus defeated Kid Kash and Stan Lee (with Tasha Simone) at the Brad Armstrong Memorial Show in Knoxville, Tennessee. The tag team bout lasted over fifteen minutes and was called the best match of the night by Larry Goodman of the PWInsider.com website.

== Championships and accomplishments ==
- Championship International Wrestling
  - CIW United States Heavyweight Championship (1 time)
- Championship Wrestling
  - CW Triple Crown Tag Team Championship (1 time) – with Beau James
- Global Wrestling Alliance
  - GWA Heavyweight Championship (1 time)
- Great American Wrestling Federation
  - GAWF Heavyweight Championship (2 times)
- National Wrestling Federation
  - NWF Heavyweight Championship (2 times)
  - NWF Tag Team Championship (1 time) – with Dark Patriot
- Northern States Wrestling Alliance
  - NSWA Tag Team Championship (1 time) – with Mike Kelly
- Pro Wrestling Illustrated
  - PWI ranked him # 249 of the 500 best singles wrestlers of the PWI 500 in 2001, 2002
- South Eastern Wrestling Alliance
  - SEWA Tag Team Championship (2 times) – with Terry Austin
- Southern Championship Wrestling
  - SCW North Carolina Championship (1 time)
- Southern States Wrestling
  - SSW Heavyweight Championship (1 time)
  - SSW Tag Team Championship (5 times) – with Beau James (3) and Steve Flynn (2)
