= Mark Curtis Memorial Weekend of Champions =

Professional wrestling show series

- Promotion: Southern States Wrestling
- Date: 2000-2003
- City: Kingsport, Tennessee, United States
- Venue: Civic Auditorium

The Mark Curtis Memorial Weekend of Champions was an annual professional wrestling memorial event produced by the Southern States Wrestling (SSW) promotion, and which was held from 2000 to 2003. The show was SSW's tribute to wrestling referee Mark Curtis who worked for the promotion days before his death. The event was part of the Children's Miracle Network's annual fundraiser.

All of the proceeds from the show were donated to the organization and SSW wrestlers took part in the East Tennessee portion of its national telethon. The 2003 edition was a benefit show for the American Cancer Society. The Weekend of Champions was also promoted as a "Legend's Reunion" pro wrestling convention and featured induction ceremonies into the Kingsport Wrestling Hall of Fame.

== Show results ==
=== First Annual Mark Curtis Memorial Weekend of Champions ===
The First Annual Mark Curtis Memorial Weekend of Champions was a two-day professional wrestling memorial show produced by Southern States Wrestling (SSW). The first show took place on May 12, 2000, in Saltville, Virginia and was headlined by "Ragin Bull'" Manny Fernandez. The main show was held the following night at the Civic Auditorium in Kingsport, Tennessee. "Chief" Wahoo McDaniels was also inducted into the Kingsport Wrestling Hall of Fame.

The main event was Ricky Harrison and The Iron Cross defending the SSW Tag Team Championship against The Family ("Handsome" Beau James and K. C. Thunder) in a Loser Leaves SSW match. James and Thunder won the match after special guest referee PJ Sharpe, their former manager, "turned heel" by hitting Harrison with a briefcase from behind and making a fast count. One of the featured matches on the undercard was The War Machine (with Chuck Jones) versus Tracey Smothers for the SSW Heavyweight Championship, which The War Machine won by pinfall. The other was Manny Fernandez versus Ron Ray and Boris Dragoff in a first-ever 3-Way Mexican Death match, which Fernandez won by climbing the corner turnbuckle and waving the flag.

==== First Night ====
May 12, 2000 in Saltville, Virginia

==== Second Night ====
May 13, 2000 in Kingsport, Tennessee (Civic Auditorium)

No.	Results	Stipulations
1	Mike Cooper defeated 6 other participants by last eliminating Death Row 2000 (Note: The other participants included were: Bryan Wayne, Flex Armstrong, Ron Craven, and Death Row 2000 (Death Row 2000 #1, Death Row 2000 #2 and Death Row 2000 #3).)	Battle royal; due to the pre-match stipulation, Cooper earned a title shot for the SSW Appalachian Championship
2	Cody Michaels defeated Roger Anderson	Singles match
3	Chuck Jones (c) (with The Duke of New York) defeated Brian Overbay	Singles match for the SSW Appalachian Championship
4	Flex Armstrong and Jim White defeated Buddy Landel and "The Duke of New York" Al Getz	Tag Team match
5	Manny Fernandez defeated Ron Ray and Boris Dragoff	3-Way Mexican Death match
6	The War Machine (with Chuck Jones) defeated Tracey Smothers (c)	Singles match for the SSW Heavyweight Championship
7	Beau James and K. C. Thunder defeated Ricky Harrison and The Iron Cross	Loser Leaves SSW tag team match for the SSW Tag Team Championship with PJ Sharpe as the special guest referee
(c) / – the champion(s) heading into the match

=== Second Annual Mark Curtis Memorial Weekend of Champions ===
The Second Annual Mark Curtis Memorial Weekend of Champions was a two-day professional wrestling memorial show produced by Southern States Wrestling (SSW). The first show took place on May 11, 2001, as a fundraiser for Central Elementary School in Johnson City, Tennessee. The main show was held the following night at the Civic Auditorium in Kingsport, Tennessee. The Kingsport Wrestling Hall of Fame induction ceremony for the Class of 2001 took place. Wild Bill Canny, one of East Tennessee's most infamous "heels" during the 1950s, led the class, which included referees Melvin Johnson and Ron West, wrestlers Sandy Scott, Buddy Landell, Arn Anderson, and SSW Commissioner Ken Bowles. As part of the Hall of Fame weekend, Ron West refereed a "Legend's match" that same night pitting Don Wright and Wayne Rogers against Hoot Gibson and Indian Harry which ended in a double disqualification.

The main event was a Steel Cage match for the SSW Tag Team Championship between then-champions The Batten Twins (Brad and Bart Batten) and The Family ("Handsome" Beau James and K. C. Thunder), with the added stipulation the losing team would leave the promotion for an entire year. Another featured match was a tag team "challenge match" in which the team of Tim Horner and Cody Michaels defeated the team Buddy Landel and Terry Taylor. On the undercard, Ricky Harrison and Tracy Smothers fought in a no-disqualification grudge match. An interpromotional Champion vs. Champion match was also held between Nationwide Championship Wrestling's Bull Pain and NWA Mid-America's Todd Morton, which Bull Pain won.

==== First Night ====
No.	Results	Stipulations
1	The 1-2-3 Express (Wade Adams and Tony Givens) defeated The Shadow and Drake Tungsten	Tag Team match
2	Roger Anderson defeated Cody Michaels	Singles match
3	Something Else (John Noble and Ed Browning) defeated Bryan Wayne and Mike Cooper	Tag Team match
4	Ricky Harrison defeated Allen King	Singles match
5	Brian Overbay defeated Brad Batten via disqualification	Singles match
6	Beau James defeated Bart Batten	Singles match

==== Second Night ====
No.	Results	Stipulations
1	Ray Idol defeated 6 other participants by last eliminating Death Row 2000 (Note: The other participants included were: The Shadow, Mike Cooper, Drake Tungsten, Bill Justice, Tony Givens, Wade Adams, Flex Armstrong, and Andy Douglas.)	Battle royal; due to the pre-match stipulation, Idol earned a title shot for the SSW Young Guns Television Championship
2	Ray Idol defeated Allen King (c)	Singles match for the SSW Young Guns Television Championship
3	Porkchop Thomas defeated Bryan Wayne (c)	Singles match for the SSW Appalachian Championship
4	Don Wright and Wayne Rogers vs. Hoot Gibson and Indian Harry ended in a double disqualification	Legend's match with Ron West as the special guest referee
5	Death & Destruction (Frank Parker and Roger Anderson) (with The Duke of New York) defeated Something Else (John Noble and Ed Browning) (c)	Tag Team match for the NCW Tag Team Championship
6	Brian Overbay and The Iron Cross defeated Death Row 2000 (Death Row 2000 #1 and Death Row 2000 #2)	Tag Team match
7	Bull Pain (with Scotty Ace) defeated Todd Morton	Champion vs. Champion match
8	Ricky Harrison (with P.J. Sharpe) defeated Tracy Smothers (with Scotty Ace)	No Disqualification match
9	Tim Horner and Cody Michaels defeated Buddy Landell and Terry Taylor	Tag Team match
10	The Batten Twins (Brad and Bart Batten) (c) defeated Beau James and K. C. Thunder	Tag Team Steel Cage match for the SSW Tag Team Championship; due to the pre-match stipulations, Beau James and K. C. Thunder were forced to leave the promotion for one year.
(c) / – the champion(s) heading into the match

=== Third Annual Mark Curtis Memorial Weekend of Champions ===
The Third Annual Mark Curtis Memorial Weekend of Champions was a two-day professional wrestling memorial show produced by Southern States Wrestling (SSW), which took place from May 10–11, 2002, at the Civic Auditorium in Kingsport, Tennessee. The Kingsport Wrestling Hall of Fame induction ceremony for the Class of 2002 took place. Paul Steele, a former Tennessee state athletic commissioner, led the class. Other inductees included wrestlers Kim Birchfied, Charlie Peters and Tim Horner. Bud Adams, who portrayed masked wrestler The Spoiler, was inducted posthumously. Other special guests included Ivan Koloff, Sandy Scott and the family of the late Whitey Caldwell. Prior to the show, a ten-bell salute was held for Randy Anderson, Lou Thesz, and Wahoo McDaniel, the latter a 2000 inductee.

The main event was Ricky Harrison's retirement match against Terry Taylor, which Harrison won. There were two other featured bouts on the undercard. The first was a tag team bout between Beau James and The War Machine and SSW Tag Team Champions K. C. Thunder and Steve Flynn. The other was a match between Shane Douglas and Tim Horner, which Douglas won via disqualification. Jimmy Valiant defeated George South in a "Legend's match".

==== First Night ====
May 10, 2002 in Kingsport, Tennessee (Civic Auditorium)

==== Second Night ====
May 11, 2002 in Kingsport, Tennessee (Civic Auditorium)

No.	Results	Stipulations
1	George South, Jr. and Kid Apollo defeated The New York Assassin and Jason King	Tag Team match
2	The Iron Cross defeated Roger Anderson	Singles match
3	The Mighty Yankee defeated Andy Douglas	Singles match
4	Jimmy Valiant defeated George South	Legend's match
5	John Noble defeated Tracy Smothers	Singles match
6	Cody Michaels defeated Buddy Landel	Singles match
7	Brandi Alexander defeated Brandi Wine	Singles match
8	Brian Overbay and Ray Idol defeated Chic White and Equalizer	Tag Team match
9	Shane Douglas defeated Tim Horner via disqualification	Singles match
10	Beau James and War Machine defeated K. C. Thunder and Steve Flynn	Tag Team match
11	Ricky Harrison defeated Terry Taylor	Retirement match

=== Fourth Annual Mark Curtis Memorial Weekend of Champions ===
The Fourth Annual Mark Curtis Memorial Weekend of Champions was a two-day professional wrestling memorial show produced by Southern States Wrestling (SSW), which took place from May 9–10, 2003, at the Civic Auditorium in Kingsport, Tennessee. Unlike previous years, the 2003 edition was held as a benefit show for the American Cancer Society. The Kingsport Wrestling Hall of Fame induction ceremony for the Class of 2003 took place. Sensational Sherri, who spent her early career in the NWA's Memphis territory, led the class. Other inductees included the Fuller and Golden wrestling families. Robert Fuller and Jimmy Golden accepted the award on their families behalf. Ken Bowles, a 2001 inductee, announced his resignation as SSW Commissioner and named ring announcer Joe Wheeler as his successor.

The main event was an impromptu SSW Heavyweight Championship match between Robbie Cassidy and Jeff Tankersley. Cassidy had won the title from Jesse Taylor the previous night in Greeneville, Tennessee and was originally scheduled to face him in a rematch. Cassidy retained the title via disqualification when Sensational Sherri, who had teamed with Tankersley in a mixed tag team match earlier that night, hit Cassidy with a "low blow" and allowed his opponent to steal the heavyweight title. Another featured bout was a No Holds Barred tag team match between the team of Beau James and K. C. Thunder (with "The Duke" Allan Barrie) and the team of Robert Fuller and Jimmy Golden, which saw James pin Fuller. Also on the card, The Batten Twins successfully defended the SSW Tag Team Championship against Flex Armstrong and Thorn, and Jimmy Valiant (with Jim White) defeated The Assassin in a "Legend's match".

==== First Night ====
May 9, 2003 in Greeneville, Tennessee

==== Second Night (Afternoon) ====
May 10, 2003 in Kingsport, Tennessee (Civic Auditorium)

No.	Results	Stipulations
1	Justin Sensation defeated Shawn Spencer	Singles match
2	Wayne Adams defeated Alabama Al	Singles match
3	Super Destroyer (with Beau James) defeated Alex Raven	Singles match
4	Bryan Wayne defeated Ricky Rocket	Singles match
5	Thorn defeated Justin Sensation	Singles match
6	Brian Overbay defeated Mike Cooper via disqualification	Singles match

==== Second Night (Evening) ====
May 10, 2003 in Kingsport, Tennessee (Civic Auditorium)

No.	Results	Stipulations
1	Bart Batten defeated Thorn via disqualification	Singles match
2	Todd Morton defeated Steve Flynn (with The Duke)	Singles match
3	Jimmy Valiant (with Jim White) defeated The Assassin (with Big Daddy)	Legend's match
4	Brian Overbay, Bryan Wayne and Ray Idol defeated Super Destroyer, Gator McAllister and Mike Cooper	Six-man tag team match
5	The Batten Twins (Brad and Bart Batten) defeated Flex Armstrong and Thorn (with Big Daddy and Tim Baldwin)	Tag Team match for the SSW Tag Team Championship
6	Scott Sterling and Brandi Alexander defeated Jeff Tankersly and Sherri Martel	Mixed tag team match
7	Beau James and K. C. Thunder (with The Duke) defeated Robert Fuller and Jimmy Golden	No Holds Barred tag team match
8	Robbie Cassidy (c) defeated Jeff Tankersly via disqualification	Singles match for the SSW Heavyweight Championship
(c) / – the champion(s) heading into the match
