= Death & Destruction =

Professional wrestling tag team

Tag team
- Members: Frank Parker; Roger Anderson; Count Grog (manager – SCW); PJ Sharp (manager – SSW)
- Name: Death & Destruction
- Billed heights: Parker: 6 ft 3 in (1.91 m); Anderson: 6 ft 2 in (1.88 m)
- Combined billed weight: 528 lb (239 kg); Parker: 265 lb (120 kg); Anderson: 263 lb (119 kg)
- Billed from: Parker: Virginia Beach, Virginia; Anderson: Minneapolis, Minnesota
- Former member: Beau James (briefly with Parker)
- Debut: 1995
- Disbanded: 2002

Death & Destruction was a professional wrestling tag team composed of Frank "The Tank" Parker (March 21, 1970) and "Ruthless" Roger Anderson (September 20, 1967). They competed in numerous regional and independent promotions throughout the Southern United States in the 1990s, and were arguably one of the region's top "heel" teams during this period.

In their seven years as a team, Parker and Anderson competed in Atlantic Coast Championship Wrestling, Cueball Carmichael's Independent Professional Wrestling Alliance, National Wrestling Alliance, North American Wrestling Association, OMEGA, Southern Championship Wrestling, Southern States Wrestling, Virginia Championship Wrestling, and the United States Wrestling Association. They also occasionally appeared in the World Wrestling Federation during the "Attitude Era".

The two men won numerous tag titles and, among their list of accomplishments, were the first-ever IPWA Tag Team Champions, winning the title a record 3-times, former SCW Tag Team Champions, and 8-time SSW Tag Team Champions. They were also the first and longest reigning VCW Tag Team Champions, defending the belts for more than two years, and the last NWA National Tag Team Champions before the title was retired in 1997.

They also gained notoriety on the Southern independents feuding with the likes of The Batten Twins (Brad and Bart Batten), Serial Thrillaz (Shane Helms and Mike Maverick), Thug Life (Christian Cage and Sexton Hardcastle), The Fantastic Express (Ricky Morton and Bobby Fulton), and The Rock 'n' Roll Express (Ricky Morton and Robert Gibson).

== History ==
=== Early years ===
Frank Parker and Roger Anderson first met while competing with Jimmy Valiant in local independent promotions in Virginia, such as Mike Sampson's United Wrestling Association, in the summer of 1994. Initially brought together by Valiant, Parker's former trainer, the two men began teaming as "Death & Destruction" on the Southeastern independent circuit the following year.

=== Southern States Wrestling (1995–1996) ===
By mid-1995, Death & Destruction had made their debut in Tennessee's Southern States Wrestling. They quickly captured the promotion's tag team championship from The Young Guns (Scott Sterling and Jeff Lovin) in Fall Branch on September 4, 1995. Their first championship reign lasted over three months until their defeat by Beau James and Dan Cooley on December 1, 1995. Although they regained it in Princeton, West Virginia, the following night, the team dropped the belts to Beau James and Ricky Morton a week later in Ledger, North Carolina.

Their third reign started after beating The Beautiful Blondes (Eddie Golden and Stan Lee) in Fall Branch on February 16, 1996. They traded the belts with The Fantastic Express (Ricky Morton and Bobby Fulton) in Johnson City, Tennessee, during the spring before eventually losing the titles to Scott Sterling and Dan Cooley on September 2, 1996.

=== Independent Professional Wrestling Alliance (1996–1997) ===
Earlier that year, Death & Destruction began wrestling for Cueball Carmichael's Independent Professional Wrestling Alliance in Alexandria, Virginia. They became the first-ever IPWA Tag Team Champions, defeating the American Patriot and Kevin Dillon, on the promotions's first show in Manassas on March 9, 1996. They would go on to win the tag team titles a record 3-times during their 15 months in the IPWA. That summer, Wahoo McDaniel came out of retirement to team with "Beastmaster" Rick Link against Parker and Anderson at an ACW show in North Carolina.

Their loss to MEWF Tag Team Champions Darkside (Glen Osbourne and Rockin' Rebel) in a "champions vs. champions", occurring during the team's second run as champions, saw Darkside win both the IPWA and MEWF titles. Death & Destruction's third and final reign began following their victory over Steve Corino and Adam Flash on March 22, 1997, in Goldsboro, North Carolina, and lasted until the championship became vacated that summer. It was around this time that Parker and Anderson won the briefly revived NWA National Tag Team Championship before it was retired that same year. A few months later, while working for Virginia Championship Wrestling, they also became the promotion's first tag team champions and held the titles over two years.

=== Southern Championship Wrestling (1997–1998) ===
Parker and Anderson spent much of 1997 in Southern Championship Wrestling with manager Count Grog where they feuded with Serial Thrillaz (Shane Helms and Mike Maverick) and Thug Life (Christian Cage and Sexton Hardcastle). On June 14, 1997, they won the SCW Tag Team Titles from C. W. Anderson and David Dawson (substituting for Pat Anderson) in Butner, North Carolina, and lost the belts to Northern Exposure (C. W. Anderson and Cueball Carmichael) in Louisburg in the fall. On August 15, 1997, Death & Destruction lost to "Raging Bull" Manny Fernandez and Victor Steamboat at the IWA Night of Legends show in Kannapolis, North Carolina.

Death & Destruction also received a tryout match for the World Wrestling Federation at the end of the year. Their first WWF appearance saw them take on The Legion of Doom (Hawk and Animal) on the December 6th 1997 edition Shotgun Saturday Night which ended in a double-countout. The team's name was not used, with Anderson wrestling as "Roger Hill", however color commentator Jim Cornette made a hidden reference to their independent work when, during the match, he commented that "the LOD [are] destroying their opponents so badly, they might as well call them death and destruction."

=== Southern States Wrestling (1997–1998) ===
Back in SSW, Death & Destruction continued to dominate the tag team division. On July 4, 1997, they defeated Beau James and War Machine in Fall Branch, Tennessee, for the SSW Tag Team Championship. They lost the titles to Beau James and a new partner, K. C. Thunder, at an October 18 show in Mountain City, Tennessee. The team won them back on December 19, 1997, and spent another three months as champions before losing the titles to Mike Cooper and Super Masked Man in Fall Branch on March 20, 1998.

=== Independent circuit (1998–1999) ===
By the late 1990s, Death & Destruction had established themselves as one of the top tag teams in the Southern independents and were most active in eastern Tennessee, Virginia and the Carolinas. Fans appreciated their hard-hitting style and adherence to traditional Southern-style 'Rasslin' reminiscent of the bygone territory-era. Dean Rasmussen, editor-in-chief of Death Valley Driver Video Review, put them in a class of modern-day Southern brawlers such as C. W. Anderson and Eddie Golden. DVDVR also listed both Parker (118) and Anderson (149) in the "Death Valley Driver 500" in 2001. Their former manager, Count Grog, named both men as his top 10 favorite wrestlers of all time. He specifically named Parker as his favorite American wrestler, claiming that he would have been a major territorial star in the 1970s, and expressed his surprise that neither had yet to be signed by either WCW or the WWF.

In early-1998, they started working for West Virginia promoter Jim Hawkins and his Atlantic Coast Championship Wrestling beating The Country Cousins (R.J. Stomper and Cousin Elmer) for the ACCW Tag Team Championship on April 11, 1998, in Buckhannon, West Virginia. They held on to the titles for most of the year before dropping them to the Baltimore Bad Boys (Eddie Edmonds and Mike Morgan) on October 10, 1998. Parker and Anderson also continued feuding with the Serial Thrillaz over the OMEGA Tag Team Championship in Matt and Jeff Hardy's OMEGA as well as in SCW. In Appalachian Mountain Wrestling later that year, Death & Destruction defeated Bryan Wayne and Scott Sterling (substituting for Stan Lee) in Coeburn, Virginia, for the APW Tag Team Championship.

=== Southern States Wrestling (1999) ===
In January 1999, Parker and Anderson began challenging then SSW Tag Team Champions The Christian Brothers (Danny & Bam Bam Christian). The two teams battled in a memorable brawl on the January 24th "Southern States Wrestling TV Special" in Kingsport, Tennessee before defeating them for the titles in Kingsport a week later. While still champions, they made their second WWF appearance as a team wrestling The Hardy Boyz (Matt and Jeff Hardy) at the sold-out UTC Arena in Chattanooga, Tennessee, in front of 7,900 fans; the match later aired on the February 27th edition of Shotgun Saturday Night.

They lost the belts back to the Christians back in Kingsport on April 25. The feuding continued, however, and a three-way match between the Christian Brothers, Death & Destruction and Steve Flynn & K. C. Thunder on July 10 in Kingsport, saw the titles go to the third team. The titles were eventually held up and declared vacant following "a wild brawl" between the three teams, with Beau James substituting for K. C. Thunder, on September 10. Parker and Anderson won the vacant titles in a match against the Memphis Bodyguards to begin their eighth and final title reign. They regularly appeared on the promotion's short-lived television show, defending the championship against such opponents as Joe Fillers & Slammin' Sam and The British Knights, before The New Rock 'n' Roll Express (Ricky Morton and Ricky Harrison) defeated them for the belts in Johnson City, Tennessee, on December 12, 1999. They also met The Batten Twins (Brad and Bart Batten) in Appalachia Pro Wrestling that same month.

=== Final years (1999–2002) ===
While continuing to wrestle for SSW, and after their departure, Death & Destruction continued touring the Southern independents. In the summer of 1999, Parker and Anderson were among the wrestlers who participated in the "Curtis Comes Home" supercard, a benefit show for World Championship Wrestling referee Brian Hildebrand, held at the Ice Gardens in Rostraver, Pennsylvania, on July 30. The show featured wrestlers from Extreme Championship Wrestling, World Championship Wrestling and the World Wrestling Federation. They were originally scheduled to wrestle The Public Enemy (Rocco Rock and Johnny Grunge), however, Beau James ended up teaming Roger Anderson while Parker wrestled Julio Sanchez in a singles match; their longtime rival wrestled as an official member of Death & Destruction for one-night only. Like the rest of the talent, Parker and Anderson wrestled without payment in order to ensure that the maximum amount of money was raised. Parker and Anderson were both part of SSW's tribute to Mark Curtis, the Mark Curtis Weekend of Champions, which raised funds for the Children's Miracle Network. The team defeated Something Else (John Noble and Ed Browning) for the NCW Tag Team Championship at the second annual Weekend of Champions.

They also wrestled for KYDA Pro Wrestling, affiliated with Cueball Carmichael's Keep Your Dreams Alive wrestling school in Staunton, Virginia, which saw the team briefly split up. On March 11, 2000, a match between the two ended in a 10-minute time limit draw. They wrestled The Nasty Boys (Brian Knobbs and Jerry Sags) in the Southeast Wrestling Alliance on May 6, 2001, the team's first appearance together since Sags suffered a career-ending neck injury several years earlier. On June 2, 2001, at the Salem Civic Center, Death & Destruction wrestled on the North American Wrestling Association's Legends Tour which featured Doink the Clown, Boris Zhukov, Ivan Koloff, Ricky "The Dragon" Steamboat, and Chief Wahoo McDaniel. A month later, they won the BWF Tag Team Championship after defeating The Bushwhackers (Luke and Butch) in a tournament final held in Puerto Rico.

Death & Destruction spent their last year in various independents. Their most notable appearances were for National Pro Wrestling and Carolina Championship Wrestling. On June 22, 2002, they entered NPW's first-ever tag team tournament held at the Mullins Elementary School in Pikeville, Kentucky. Their last appearance as a team was at a special CCW supercard, "Mid Atlantic Reunion", as a tribute to "the great legends of Mid Atlantic Wrestling's past". The show was held on July 6, 2002, at Uncle Bill's Flea Market in Sylva, North Carolina, and featured many former stars including Jimmy Valiant, The Barbarian, Mr. Hughes, Greg "The Hammer" Valentine, and Bunkhouse Buck. Magnum T. A. also made a rare appearance in the semi-main event serving as the cornerman of Ricky Morton and The Iron Sheik during their match against Buddy Landel and George South. Parker and Anderson beat Jason King and T.C. Carter. Frank Parker subsequently left the business while Roger Anderson returned to SSW. For a few years afterwards, Anderson continued wrestling on the independents as a singles wrestler before retiring to become a high school teacher in Tennessee.

== Championships and accomplishments ==
- Appalachian Mountain Wrestling
  - AMW Tag Team Championship (1 time)
- Atlantic Coast Championship Wrestling
  - ACCW Tag Team Championship (1 time)
- Bruiser Wrestling Federation
  - BWF Tag Team Championship (1 time)
- Independent Professional Wrestling Alliance
  - IPWA Tag Team Championship (3 times)
- Mountain State Wrestling Association
  - MSWA Tag Team Championship (1 time, last)
- National Wrestling Alliance
  - NWA National Tag Team Championship (1 time, last)
- Nationwide Championship Wrestling
  - NCW Tag Team Championship (1 time)
- New Dimension Wrestling
  - NDW Tag Team Championship (1 time)
- Pro Wrestling Illustrated
  - PWI ranked Frank Parker # 297 of the 500 best singles wrestlers of the PWI 500 in 1999
  - PWI ranked Roger Anderson # 317 of the 500 best singles wrestlers of the PWI 500 in 1999
- Southern Championship Wrestling
  - SCW Tag Team Championship (1 time)
- Southern States Wrestling
  - SSW Tag Team Championship (8 times)
- Virginia Championship Wrestling
  - VCW Tag Team Championship (1 time)
- Other Titles
  - NIWA Tag Team Championship (1 time)
