= Young Guns =

Young Guns may refer to:

== Film and television ==
- Young Guns (film), a 1988 action/western film
  - Young Guns II, the 1990 sequel to the 1988 film
- Young Guns of Texas, a 1962 western film
- The Young Guns (film), a 1956 western film directed by Albert Band

== Music ==
- Young Guns (band), a British alternative rock band
- "Young Guns (Go for It)", a 1982 song by Wham!
- "Young Guns" (Lewi White song), a 2011 song by Lewi White featuring Ed Sheeran, Yasmin, Griminal and Devlin
- Young Guns, a 2014 live album by Pat Martino recorded in 1968-69

== Sports ==
- North Queensland Young Guns, an earlier Australian rugby league team competing in the Queensland Cup
- Strikeforce: Young Guns, a series of mixed martial arts events held in 2007 and 2008
- SSW Young Guns Championship, a secondary professional wrestling championship in Southern States Wrestling

== Other uses ==
- YoungGuns International Award, an annual global award show
- Young Guns: A New Generation of Conservative Leaders, a book by Eric Cantor, Kevin McCarthy, and Paul Ryan, and their Young Guns program
