= The Headbangers =

Professional wrestling tag team

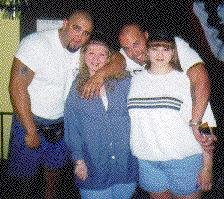
- Mosh (left) and Thrasher (right) posing with fans

Tag team
- Name(s): The Flying Nuns; The Guardians of Truth; The Headbangers; The Sisters of Love; The Spiders
- Members: Mosh; Thrasher
- Combined billed weight: 488 lb (221 kg)
- Hometown: Monastery in the Himalayas, New Jersey
- Debut: 1994
- Years active: 1994–2000; 2011–present

The Headbangers are a professional wrestling tag team consisting of Mosh (Charles Warrington) and Thrasher (Glenn Ruth). They are currently signed to WWE as ambassadors.

As the name of the team implies, their gimmick is that they are a pair of metalheads, complete with heavy metal related T-shirts, kilts, piercings, goatees, shaved heads, and black face paint.

== History ==
=== Beginning (1994–1996) ===
They were both trained by Larry Sharpe in New Jersey in the early 1990s. Warrington and Ruth teamed up in 1994 as the Spiders in their home state, New Jersey, for the National Wrestling Alliance. They made an Eastern Championship Wrestling appearance in June 1994, losing to The Bad Breed (Axl and Ian Rotten). Also they worked for United States Wrestling Association (USWA) feuding with the Rottens and The Eliminators. They had a brief stint in Dallas for the NWA in 1995. Later that year they moved down to Tennessee in Smoky Mountain Wrestling (SMW). It was there that they changed their gimmicks to the Headbangers. Their slogan was "Real men wear skirts." During their time in SMW, they feuded with The Rock 'n' Roll Express (Ricky Morton and Robert Gibson) and The Thugs (Tracy Smothers and Tony Anthony), and later sided with Jim Cornette and Terry Gordy in their feud with Brad Armstrong over the SMW Heavyweight Championship. By the end of the year, SMW folded and they returned to United States Wrestling Association. In December 1995, they debuted as jobbers in the WWF as the Spiders, the Arachnoids, and even used their real names. On an episode of Monday Night Raw they got a World Tag Team Title shot against the Smoking Gunns. Afterwards, they continued working for the USWA and the independent circuit. On January 5, 1996, the Headbangers became the inaugural HWA Tag Team Champions, but vacated the titles later in the year.

=== World Wrestling Federation (1996–2000) ===
==== WWF Tag Team Champions ====
The team debuted on WWF television on the November 24, 1996 episode of Superstars under their Headbangers gimmick defeating Alex Porteau and Aldo Montoya. Shortly after that, they began wearing nuns' clothing and billed as the Flying Nuns (a play on the television show of the same name), Sister Angelica and Mother Smucker. They were also humorously billed as hailing from a monastery in the Himalayas. On an episode of Shotgun Saturday Night, Brother Love showed up to manage the Nuns. After the Nuns defeated The Godwinns, Love renamed them the Sisters of Love. The gimmick was short-lived, but they kept the skirts when they returned to being The Headbangers in January 1997. They later had T-shirts with the phrase "Real men wear skirts" and occasionally wore sports bras over their shirts. The duo often carried a boombox to the ring, and on one occasion, Mosh vomited during an interview.

Throughout 1997, The Headbangers (who were Tweeners), feuded with The Godwinns, as well as Doug Furnas and Phil Lafon, often finding themselves on the losing end. They faced The Legion of Doom during their surprise return match on February 24 to a double countout. At WrestleMania 13, the Headbangers competed in a Four-Way Elimination match to determine the #1 contenders for the WWF Tag Team Championship. They won the match defeating Doug Furnas and Philip LaFon, The Godwinns and The New Blackjacks. The following night on the March 13, 1997, episode of Raw they challenged the WWF Tag Team Champions Owen Hart and the British Bulldog winning via disqualification however they did not win the titles due to champions advantage. In September of that year the current WWF Tag Team Champions Stone Cold Steve Austin and Dude Love vacated their championships due to Austin suffering a neck injury. This led to The Headbangers competing in a four-way elimination match on September 7, 1997, at the Ground Zero: In Your House for vacant WWF World Tag Team Championships. They won the match defeating The Godwinns, The Legion of Doom and the British Bulldog and Owen Hart. The Headbangers won the vacant Tag Team title after Mosh pinned Owen Hart, thanks to run-in interference by Steve Austin. This marked their first and only Tag Team Championship reign. They defended the Tag Team Championships on The September 15, on an episode of Raw against the Bret Hart & The British Bulldog, winning the match via disqualification. On October 5, at Badd Blood: In Your House they lost the titles to The Godwinns putting an end to their 28 day reign. They faced The New Age Outlaws in their debut match as a team on October 20.

The two are seen backstage playing with Bret Hart's son, Blade, in the 1998 documentary film Hitman Hart: Wrestling with Shadows. The footage depicts events from the previous year.

Both Mosh and Thrasher entered the 1998 Royal Rumble and both lasted over 10 minutes before Mosh was eliminated by Kurrgan and Thrasher by Steve Austin. On February 17, 1998, The Headbangers won the NWA World Tag Team Championship from The Rock 'n' Roll Express, which aired on the February 23 edition of Raw Is War. They lost the belts the following month to The Midnight Express. They feuded with The Quebecers and the Oddities throughout the year and become the first Maryland Championship Wrestling Tag Team Champions on August 18 defeating Jimmy Cicero and Julio Sanchez in the finals of a tournament. They later dropped the titles to the dou in a rematch on September 20, ending their reign at 35 days. In late 1998, The Headbangers started a feud with the WWF Tag Team Champions, the New Age Outlaws. On October 12, during an episode of Raw Thrasher and Mosh attacked Road Dogg by smashing a Boombox over his head. On October 18, The Headbangers challenged the New Age Outlaws at Judgment Day. During the match Road Dogg smashed a boombox over Mosh’s head giving The Headbangers a disqualification victory over the champions. Following the match Thrasher and Mosh declared themselves the "Tag Team Champions of the Universe" and began carrying toy versions of the WWF Tag Team Championships.

==== Split and reunion ====
The Headbangers were both meant to compete in the 1999 Royal Rumble, but Thrasher suffered a (legitimate) knee injury and was shelved while Mosh was (kayfabe) attacked backstage by Viscera as a way to write both men off television. They worked in the independents until Thrasher got injured in May 1999. While Thrasher was injured, Mosh would be repackaged as Beaver Cleavage and then Chaz, performed in singles competition and began having problems with his on-screen girlfriend, Marianna Komlos. He was kayfabe arrested on an episode of Sunday Night Heat in September after Komlos claimed he hit her. After Chaz's match on October 5, Glenn Ruth (Thrasher) showed GTV footage of Mariana applying makeup to create the effect of wounds. This proved her accusations false, and The Headbangers subsequently reunited. They then took on a gimmick where they dressed as the opponents that they feuded with, such as the Dudley Boyz and Mean Street Posse. The duo later turned heel and began to dress in drag, which included wearing breast cones.

Mosh entered in the 2000 Royal Rumble alone eliminated by Rikishi; however, The Headbangers continued performing in tag team and singles matches. Both men participated in the Hardcore battle royal at WrestleMania 2000 where Thrasher held the title for 43 seconds defeating Joey Abs. The team continued battling the likes of Too Cool and T & A until July 2000. After being together for six long years, they separated, and Mosh joined D'Lo Brown as Chaz to form Lo Down. Thrasher focused on his singles career and was taken off WWF TV and the main roster later that month.

Glenn Ruth was released from the WWF in December 2000, after working several months in their developmental territory Power Pro Wrestling in Memphis, and Charles Warrington was released from the WWF in August 2001.

=== Criticism by WWE ===
Years after their departure from the company, The Headbangers have borne the brunt of criticism by WWE media. One example can be found in a 2007 article in WWE Magazine about the history of WWE champions. The article criticized wrestlers who are considered not worthy of winning a belt they held. The Headbangers were included in this article for their supposedly poor Tag Team Championship reign. The article suggested that the team had the titles by default since it was "in between the eras of The Smoking Gunns and the New Age Outlaws."

WWE's Raw 15th Anniversary magazine also includes a list of 15 superstars who "overstayed" their welcomes in the company. This has The Headbangers at #2, behind only Scott Steiner. However, in 2010 WWE added the team to their "Where Are They Now?" section of WWE.com.

=== Independent circuit (2011–present) ===
Mosh and Thrasher reunited on the independent circuit in 2011. They are members of the NWA Ring Warriors roster. They wrestled for Juggalo Championship Wrestling multiple times. On August 12, 2011, The Headbangers were in the battle royal won by Zach Gowen. On December 17, 2011, The Headbangers defeated Necro Butcher and Mad Man Pondo. December 31, 2011, The Headbangers lost to Shockwave The Robot and 2 Tuff Tony. The Headbangers then lost two ten-man tag team matches while teaming with Bull Pain, Jake Manning and Colt Cabana. On February 11, 2012, The Headbangers defeated Sally Boy and The Blackhart to win the Coastal Championship Wrestling Tag Team Championships.

Mosh and Thrasher appeared on the Ring of Honor pay-per-view Best in the World on June 24, 2012 as the masked tag team Guardians of Truth, managed by the Truth Martini. They lost to the Briscoe Brothers. On September 8, they lost in the Global Tag Team Championship tournament final against Wes Brisco & Cassidy Riley at NWA Ring Warriors September Storm. Later on, the two would unmask themselves and go on to compete as The Headbangers. They then competed on the Independent Circuit. In March 2013, both Headbangers were present during a WWE Smackdown taping. On June 18, 2013, The Headbangers defeated The South Side Playaz Club (Craig Steele and Joe Hardway) at PWS Dream on 6th Anniversary iPPV. On June 22, they vacated the Coastal Championship Wrestling Tag Team Championships ending their 497 day reign.

The Headbangers made their debut for Championship Wrestling Entertainment (CWE) competing in a triple threat match at Wrestlefest 2015. In 2016 they made their debut for Fighting Evolution Wrestling (FEW), on January 21, 2017, they won the FEW Tag Team Championships. On March 31, 2017 they defeated Cryme Tyme at Fighting Evolution Wrestling in Orlando, Florida. Later that same year they went Australia to wrestle for World Series Wrestling and feuded with The Basso Brothers. On August 12, they won the FEW Tag Team Championships for a second time defeating Alex G and B. Psi Phi. They would lose the titles to Cool Pimpin on December 16.

On February 23, 2019, The Headbangers faced Billy Gunn and Gangrel at GWA High Stakes in a losing effort. Throughout 2019, and 2020, The Headbangers unsuccessfully challenged for the Atomic Revolutionary Wrestling Tag Team Championships on multiple occasions. However on October 23, 2020 they finally won the Championships defeating The Brothers In Arms in a Three Stages of Hell Match.

On November 23, 2021, The Headbangers won the vacant Figure Wrestling Federation Tag Team Championships in a four tag team match defeating The Shook Crew, The Mane Event and Eric James & Jack Tomlinson.

On January 7, 2023, The Headbangers defeated El Queso to win the ALW Tag Team Championships marking their second reign with the titles. In October 2023, the Headbangers appeared on the NWA pay-per-view Samhain, losing a tag match to The Southern 6 (Kerry Morton and Alex Taylor). On February 23, 2024, The Headbangers lost the ALW Tag Team Championships to The Kings Of Evil.

In November 2025, The Headbangers announced their retirement tour would take place throughout 2026, with their retirement match taking place on July 23, at the ISPW Legends event in Wildwood, New Jersey. However due to Mosh suffering an injury in Spring 2026, The Headbangers extended their retirement tour to December. During this retirement tour The Headbangers won multiple championships including United States Wrestling Tag Team Championships, The MCW Tag Team Championships, All Star Wrestling Tag Team Championship and the Noble Champions Group Tag Team Championships.

=== Return to WWE (2016) ===
The duo made their first appearance as a team in WWE since 2000 on the August 30, 2016 episode of SmackDown Live as heels and participants of the SmackDown Tag Team Championship tournament, losing against Heath Slater and Rhyno in the first round. They returned on the November 1 episode of SmackDown, losing to The Usos in a Survivor Series qualifying match. Then they were seen again on the November 15 900th episode of SmackDown, teaming with other heel tag teams which marked their last match in the company.

In May 2023, it was announced The Headbangers signed a legends deal with the WWE.

== Championships and accomplishments ==
- All-Star Wrestling
  - ASW Tag Team Championship (1 time)
- Atomic Legacy Wrestling

- ALW Tag Team Championship (2 times)

- Coastal Championship Wrestling

- CCW Tag Team Championship (1 time)

- Fighting Evolution Wrestling
  - FEW Tag Team Championship (2 times)
- Figure Wrestling Federation
  - FWF Tag Team Championship (1 time)
- Heartland Wrestling Association
  - HWA Tag Team Championship (1 time inaugural)
- Heroes And Legends Wrestling
  - HLW Tag Team Championship (1 time)
- Independent Professional Wrestling Alliance
  - IPWA Tag Team Championship (1 time)
- Insane Championship Wrestling
  - ICW Streetfight Tag Team Championship (1 time)
- Main Event Championship Wrestling
  - MECW Tag Team Championship (1 time)
- MCW Pro Wrestling
  - MCW Tag Team Championship (1 time)
- Maryland Championship Wrestling
  - MCW Tag Team Championship (1 time inaugural)
- Mid-Eastern Wrestling Federation
  - MEWF Tag Team Championship (3 times)
- National Wrestling Alliance
  - NWA World Tag Team Championship (1 time)
- National Wrestling League
  - NWL Tag Team Championship (1 time)
- New England Wrestling Federation
  - NEWF Tag Team Championship (3 times)
- Noble Champions Group
  - NCG Tag Team Championship (1 time, current)
- Texas Wrestling Alliance
  - TWA Tag Team Championship (1 time)
- USA Pro Wrestling
  - UPW Tag Team Championship (1 time)
- United States Wrestling
  - USW Tag Team Championship (1 time)
- World Wrestling Association
  - WWA Tag Team Championship (1 time current)
- World Wrestling Federation
  - WWF Hardcore Championship (1 time) – Thrasher
  - WWF Tag Team Championship (1 time)
- Wrestling For Charity
  - WFC Tag Team Championship (1 time)

== See also ==
- Cross-dressing
