= Scott Sterling =

Scott Sterling may refer to:

- Scott Sterling (golfer) (born 1972), American golfer
- Scott Sterling (fictional), fictional athlete and subject of viral video
- Scott Monroe Sterling, also known as Scott La Rock (1962–1987), American DJ and producer
- Scott Sterling (1980–2013), son of former NBA team owner Donald Sterling
- Scott Sterling (20th century), American professional wrestler and SSW Tag Team Championship winner

== See also ==
- Scott Stirling, American ice hockey player
- Scotty Stirling, American sports executive and sportswriter
