= Mosh (wrestler) =

American professional wrestler (born 1971)

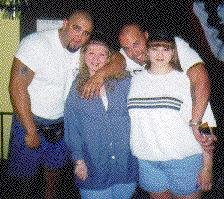
- Mosh (left) and Thrasher (right)

Personal information
- Born: Chaz Warrington; May 28, 1971 (age 55) Cherry Hill, New Jersey, U.S.
- Website: https://chazmosh.com/

Professional wrestling career
- Ring name(s): Beaver Cleavage; Chaz; Chaz Ware; Guardian #1; Mosh; Mother Smucker; Spider #1
- Billed height: 6 ft 2 in (188 cm)
- Billed weight: 243 lb (110 kg)
- Billed from: Cherry Hill, New Jersey
- Trained by: Larry Sharpe; Thrasher
- Debut: 1992

Chaz Warrington (born May 28, 1971) is an American professional wrestler best known for his time in the World Wrestling Federation as the wrestler Mosh as one-half of the tag team The Headbangers along with Thrasher.

== Professional wrestling career ==
=== Early career (1992–1996) ===
Warrington began training under Larry Sharpe and Glenn Ruth in the early 1990s. In 1993 he would make several appearances in the World Wrestling Federation as an enhancement talent (under the name Chaz Ware). In 1994, he teamed up with his co-trainer Glenn Ruth. He and Ruth, working as the masked team "the Spiders", lost to Axel and Ian Rotten in ECW. He wrestled under a variety of names and gimmicks. Between 1995 and 1996, the Spiders changed their gimmick and became the Headbangers, working for Smoky Mountain Wrestling, the independent circuit, and the United States Wrestling Association. The Spiders worked a few matches for the World Wrestling Federation in December 1995. After Smoky Mountain shut its doors, the Headbangers worked full-time for the United States Wrestling Association and won the Mid-Eastern Wrestling Federation Tag Team Championship three times during the summer and fall of 1996, and became the inaugural HWA Tag Team Champions.

=== World Wrestling Federation (1996–2001) ===
==== Headbangers (1996–1999) ====
The duo made appearances as themselves, as the Spiders, and later as The Flying Nuns, with Warrington portraying Mother Smucker and Ruth portraying Sister Angelica; the characters debuted on the premiere episode of Shotgun Saturday Night, alongside Brother Love, in January 1997. Warrington and Ruth were best known as Mosh (Warrington) and Thrasher (Ruth), The Headbangers, a pair of metal fans who dressed in kilts.

Mosh and Thrasher returned to wrestling as "The Headbangers" in early 1997. On March 23, at WrestleMania 13, the Headbangers competed in a Four-Way Elimination match to determine the #1 contenders for the WWF Tag Team Championship. They won the match defeating Doug Furnas and Philip LaFon, The Godwinns and The New Blackjacks. The following night on the March 13, 1997, episode of Raw they challenged the WWF Tag Team Champions Owen Hart and the British Bulldog winning via disqualification however they did not win the titles due to champions advantage. In September of that year the current WWF Tag Team Champions Stone Cold Steve Austin and Dude Love vacated their championships due to Austin suffering a neck injury. This led to The Headbangers competing in a four-way elimination match on September 7, 1997, at the Ground Zero: In Your House for vacant WWF World Tag Team Championships. They won the match defeating The Godwinns, The Legion of Doom and the British Bulldog and Owen Hart marking their first and only Tag Team Championship reign. They defended the Tag Team Championships on The September 15, on an episode of Raw against the Bret Hart & The British Bulldog, winning the match via disqualification. On October 5, at Badd Blood: In Your House they lost the titles to The Godwinns putting an end to their 28 day reign.

Mosh entered the 1998 Royal Rumble and lasted over 10 minutes before being eliminated by Kurrgan. On February 17, 1998, The Headbangers won the NWA World Tag Team Championship from The Rock 'n' Roll Express, which aired on the February 23 edition of Raw Is War. They lost the belts the following month to The Midnight Express. They feuded with The Quebecers and the Oddities throughout the year and become the first Maryland Championship Wrestling Tag Team Champions on August 18, defeating Jimmy Cicero and Julio Sanchez in the finals of a tournament. They later dropped the titles to the dou in a rematch on September 20, ending their reign at 35 days. In late 1998, The Headbangers started a feud with the WWF Tag Team Champions, the New Age Outlaws. On October 12, during an episode of Raw Thrasher and Mosh attacked Road Dogg by smashing a Boombox over his head. On October 18, The Headbangers challenged the New Age Outlaws at Judgment Day. During the match Road Dogg smashed a boombox over Mosh’s head giving The Headbangers a disqualification victory over the champions. Following the match Mosh ans Thrasher declared themselves the "Tag Team Champions of the Universe" and began carrying toy versions of the WWF Tag Team Championships.

In January 1999, the Headbangers were taken off the WWF roster and worked in the independents and Maryland Championship Wrestling. On April 8, Mosh defeated Romeo Valentino to win the MCW Heavyweight Championship, on June 17, he lost the title to Tom Brandi putting an end to his 70 day reign.

==== Beaver Cleavage/Chaz (1999) ====
After Thrasher suffered a knee injury in May 1999, Warrington was renamed "Beaver Cleavage", a reference to the TV series Leave It to Beaver. He appeared in black-and-white vignettes with his "mother", the voluptuous Mrs. Cleavage, and the two would exchange sexual innuendos (e.g. Mrs. Cleavage would offer Beaver some of "Mother's milk" when he complained that his cereal was dry). The gimmick was quickly scrapped (via a 'worked shoot' promo in which Warrington supposedly gave up on the character), and retailored.

On June 28, Warrington, now calling himself "Chaz", ridiculed the Beaver Cleavage gimmick and identified Mrs. Cleavage as his girlfriend, Marianna Komlos, in a shoot-style interview. Warrington and Komlos feuded with Meat and his female entourage, then with Prince Albert. Warrington left Komlos on the September 12 episode of Sunday Night Heat, and she begged him to take her back throughout the night. The following night on the September 13 episode of Raw is War, Komlos came to ringside with a black eye, and it was implied that Warrington had beaten her. Over the following weeks, Warrington would be on the receiving end of beatdowns from various wrestlers as well as being the victim of biased calls and actions by officials, all of whom were angry at Warrington for allegedly beating Komlos. Komlos attempted to have police arrest Warrington, but he was saved by the intervention of Thrasher, who showed film that demonstrated that Komlos was lying. Komlos was arrested, and the Headbangers were reformed.

==== Headbangers (1999–2000) ====
The Headbangers then adopted a gimmick in which they would dress as opponents they feuded with, such as the Dudley Boyz and the Mean Street Posse. They later turned heel and began dressing in drag, most notably wearing breast cones.

==== Lo Down (2000–2001) ====
In June 2000, Warrington, once again known as Chaz, formed a new tag team with D'Lo Brown known as Lo Down. They enjoyed minor success, but were paired with Tiger Ali Singh and given the gimmicks of two bitter ethnic wrestlers who felt that they were being held down. They were given new ring attire, incorporating turbans and sashes, began using Tiger's entrance music, and were even given Arabic sounding names on one episode of Sunday Night Heat. The popularity of the team rapidly dwindled; at the 2001 Royal Rumble they were both denied a spot in the Rumble match, as their spot had been given to comedian Drew Carey. The team was eventually taken off TV, and Brown, Singh and Chaz were sent to the developmental territory. The team worked for IWA Puerto Rico in June and July 2001.

Chaz had his final WWF match on the July 30, 2001 edition of Raw is War in a dark match defeating the Inferno Kid.

=== Independent circuit (2001–2016) ===
After being released from the WWF in August 2001, Chaz wrestled occasionally on the independent circuit in Florida and Maryland Championship Wrestling.

On August 6, 2005, Chaz defeated Norman Smiley for the MXPW Heavyweight Championship in Okeechobee, Florida. He dropped the title to The Warlord on April 29, 2006.

On February 12, 2011, Mosh reunited with Thrasher for the first time since WWF in June 2000. That night they defeated Christian York and Danny Doring at Maryland Wrestling Federation in Severn, Maryland.

Mosh and Thrasher appeared on the Ring of Honor pay-per-view Best in the World on June 24, 2012, as the masked tag team Guardians of Truth, managed by Truth Martini. They lost to the Briscoe Brothers. Later on, the two would unmask themselves and go on to compete as the Head Bangers.

In 2013, he joined Ring Warriors under the nickname That Simply Tremendous Dude. On October 14, 2013, he presented his Simply Tremendous Delegate Adam Barisano. The next week, Warrington turned heel, defeating Shooter Storm.

=== Return to WWE (2016) ===
On August 26, 2016, it was reported that Mosh and Thrasher would return to WWE, as part of the SmackDown brand. They lost their return match to Heath Slater and Rhyno on the August 30 episode of SmackDown. They also fought The Usos for a chance to compete at Survivor Series, but ended up losing. The Headbangers appeared on the November 15, 2016 900th episode edition of SmackDown Live teaming-up with other villainous teams.

In May 2023, it was announced both Mosh and Thrasher signed a legends deal with the WWE.

=== Return to Independent circuit (2017-present) ===
After leaving WWE at the end of 2016, the Headbangers returned to the independent circuit. That year they made their debut for Fighting Evolution Wrestling (FEW), and on January 21, 2017, they won the FEW Tag Team Championships. On August 12, they won the FEW Tag Team Championships for a second time defeating Alex G and B. Psi Phi. They would lose the titles to Cool Pimpin on December 16.

Throughout 2019, and 2020, The Headbangers unsuccessfully challenged for the Atomic Revolutionary Wrestling Tag Team Championships on multiple occasions. However on October 23, 2020 they finally won the Championships defeating The Brothers In Arms in a Three Stages of Hell Match.

On November 23, 2021, The Headbangers won the vacant Figure Wrestling Federation Tag Team Championships in a four tag team match defeating The Shook Crew, The Mane Event and Eric James & Jack Tomlinson.

In October 2023, the Headbangers appeared on the NWA pay-per-view Samhain, losing a tag match to The Southern 6 (Kerry Morton and Alex Taylor).

In November 2025, The Headbangers announced their retirement tour would take place throughout 2026, with their retirement match taking place on July 23, at the ISPW Legends event in Wildwood, New Jersey. However due to Mosh suffering an injury in Spring 2026, The Headbangers extended their retirement tour to December. During this retirement tour The Headbangers won multiple championships including United States Wrestling Tag Team Championships, The MCW Tag Team Championships, All Star Wrestling Tag Team Championship and the Noble Champions Group Tag Team Championships.

=== Indiana Powerhouse Wrestling (2023) ===
On September 9, 2023, Mosh teamed with Thrasher at Indiana Powerhouse Wrestling's "Head Games 2" event in Muncie, Indiana. That night, the Headbangers faced the World Famous (in 2 Counties) Mudflap Mafia. During the match, Mosh's nipples were grabbed several times.

== Other media ==
Warrington appeared in the 1996 film Box of Moonlight as "Castroater". Alongside Thrasher, he appears as Mosh in WWF War Zone, WWF Attitude, WWE 2K24 as downloadable content and WWE 2K25. Since 2024, Warrington has hosted his own podcast on his YouTube channel.

== Personal life ==
Warrington is married and has one son. Outside of wrestling he has worked as a Sales Director for DEX Imaging in Tampa, Florida. During the late 2000s and 2010s Warrington played in and won multiple kickball tournaments for the nationally ranked travel team The Meatballs.

Warrington is a survivor of thyroid cancer. He started the Live Fortunate clothing brand following his diagnosis and has since worked with multiple nonprofits in South Florida.

== Championships and accomplishments ==
- All-Star Wrestling
  - ASW Tag Team Championship (1 time) — with Thrasher
- Atomic Revolutionary Wrestling
  - ARW Tag Team Championship (1 time) - with Thrasher
- Coastal Championship Wrestling
  - CCW Tag Team Championship (1 time) – with Thrasher
- Fighting Evolution Wrestling
  - FEW Tag Team Championship (2 times) – with Thrasher
- Figure Wrestling Federation
  - FWF Tag Team Championship (1 time) - with Thrasher
- Heroes And Legends Wrestling
  - HLW Tag Team Championship (1 time, current) - with Thrasher
- Heartland Wrestling Association
  - HWA Tag Team Championship (1 time) – with Thrasher
- Independent Professional Wrestling Alliance
  - IPWA Tag Team Championship (1 time) – with Thrasher
- Insane Championship Wrestling
  - ICW Streetfight Tag Team Championship (1 time) – with Thrasher
- Main Event Championship Wrestling
  - MECW Tag Team Championship (1 time) – with Thrasher
- Maryland Championship Wrestling
  - MCW Heavyweight Championship (1 time)
  - MCW Tag Team Championship (1 time) – with Thrasher
- Maximum Xtreme Pro Wrestling
  - MXPW Heavyweight Championship (1 time)
- MCW Pro Wrestling
  - MCW Tag Team Championship (1 time) — with Thrasher
- National Wrestling Alliance
  - NWA World Tag Team Championship (1 time) – with Thrasher
- National Wrestling League
  - NWL Tag Team Championship (1 time) – with Thrasher
- New England Wrestling Federation
  - NEWF Tag Team Championship (3 times) – with Thrasher
- Noble Champions Group
  - NCG Tag Team Championship (1 time, current) - with Thrasher
- Pro Wrestling Illustrated
  - Ranked No. 104 of the top 500 singles wrestlers in the PWI 500 in 1997
- Texas Wrestling Alliance
  - TWA Tag Team Championship (1 time) – with Thrasher
- United States Wrestling
  - USW Tag Team Championship (1 time) — with Thrasher
- World Wrestling Alliance / WWA New Jersey
  - WWA Tag Team Championship (1 time) – with Thrasher
- World Wrestling Federation
  - WWF Tag Team Championship (1 time) – with Thrasher
- Wrestling For Charity
  - WFC Tag Team Championship (1 time) - with Thrasher
