= Carl Fergie =

American professional wrestler (born 1953)

Personal information
- Born: Carl Fergie; April 25, 1953 (age 73) Oklahoma, U.S.
- Family: Gary Fergie (brother); Jerry Lawler (cousin); The Honky Tonk Man (cousin)

Professional wrestling career
- Ring name(s): Carl Fergie; King Carl Fergie; Pretty Boy Fergie; Freddy Krueger; Mr. Wrestling; Ragin' Cajun #2
- Billed height: 6 ft 2 in (188 cm)
- Billed weight: 245 lb (111 kg)
- Trained by: Herb Welch
- Debut: 1975
- Retired: 1998

Carl Fergie (born April 25, 1953) is an American retired professional wrestler who competed in Memphis in the 1980s for Continental Wrestling Association, Jim Crockett Promotions, Mid-South and other National Wrestling Alliance territories.

== Wrestling career ==
Made his wrestling debut in 1975. He made his debut for Mid-South Wrestling in 1979 and worked on and off for the territory until 1984. He also served as a referee for Mid-South.

In 1980, he made his debut for the Memphis-based promotion Continental Wrestling Association where he became a mainstay.

Also in 1980, Fergie worked for All Japan Pro Wrestling. In 1981, he wrestled in Japan's International Wrestling Enterprise.

He won the NWA Mid-Atlantic Tag Team Championship with Ox Baker in 1981. Fergie continued to work for Mid-Atlantic and Georgia Championship Wrestling in 1982.

After leaving Mid-South in 1984, Fergie continued to work for Continental Wrestling Association (CWA). He won their version of the heavyweight title defeating Jeff Jarrett on September 9, 1987. A week later on September 14, he lost the title back to Jarrett. CWA folded in 1989 and Fergie took a hiatus from wrestling.

In 1994, he returned to wrestling, working for World Championship Wrestling losing to The Guardian Angel and Dustin Rhodes.

He teamed with Reginald Walker losing to the New Blackjacks on WWF Shotgun Saturday Night on May 21, 1997.

In 1998, he worked as Mr. Wrestling for Power Pro Wrestling. He retired from wrestling that year.

== Personal life ==
He is the brother of wrestler Gary Fergie. He is the cousins of The Honky Tonk Man and Jerry Lawler.

Fergie currently owns a Gold's Gym in Jackson, Tennessee.

== Championships and accomplishments ==
- Continental Wrestling Association
  - NWA Mid-America Heavyweight Championship (1 time)
- Mid-Atlantic Championship Wrestling
  - NWA Mid-Atlantic Tag Team Championship (1 time) – with Ox Baker
- Southern States Wrestling
  - Kingsport Wrestling Hall of Fame (Class of 2008)
