= SSW Tag Team Championship =

Professional wrestling championship

Details
- Promotion: Southern States Wrestling
- Date established: October 1, 1990
- Current champion(s): Shawn Cruz and The Mega Destroyer
- Date won: July 6, 2019
Statistics
- First champion(s): Bam Bam Christian and Danny Christian
- Most reigns: As a team: Death & Destruction (Frank Parker and Roger Anderson) (8 reigns); As individual: Beau James (13 reigns)
- Longest reign: Wayne Rogers and George Hiatt (517 days)
- Shortest reign: Robbie Cassidy and Tony Givens (<1 day)

The Southern States Wrestling (SSW) Tag Team Championship is a professional wrestling tag team championship in Southern States Wrestling. It was first won by Danny and Bam Bam Christian when they defeated The Russian Assassins in Hampton, Tennessee on October 1, 1990. The title is generally defended in the Southern United States, most often in its home base in East Tennessee, but has been defended in other parts of the country as well. While touring New England in late-1996, the titles changed hands when Scott Sterling & Dan Cooley lost the belts to Justin St. John & Steve Flynn in Revere, Massachusetts on November 23, 1996. There are 30 recognized known teams with a total of 65 title reigns.

== Title history ==
Key
No.	Overall reign number
Reign	Reign number for the specific team—reign numbers for the individuals are in parentheses, if different
Days	Number of days held
<1	Reign lasted less than a day
+	Current reign is changing daily

No.	Champion	Championship change			Reign statistics		Notes	Ref.
No.	Champion	Date	Event	Location	Reign	Days	Notes	Ref.
1	The Christian Brothers (Bam Bam Christian and Danny Christian)	October 1, 1990	House show	Hampton, Tennessee	1	33	Defeated The Russian Assassins to become the inaugural champions.	
2	Wayne Rogers and George Hiatt	November 3, 1990	House show	Kingsport, Tennessee	1	517		
3	The Regulators (Stone and Steel)	April 3, 1992	House show	Fall Branch, Tennessee	1	124		
4	The Young Guns (Scott Sterling and Jeff Lovin)	August 5, 1992	House show	Kingsport, Tennessee	1	177		
5	Death Riders (Chic White and Tennessee Equalizer)	January 29, 1993	House show	Fall Branch, Tennessee	1	220		
6	G.Q. Stratus and Jimmy Golden	September 6, 1993	House show	Fall Branch, Tennessee	1	17		
7	The Christian Brothers (Bam Bam Christian and Danny Christian)	September 23, 1993	House show	Fall Branch, Tennessee	2	85		
8	Death Riders (Chic White and Tennessee Equalizer)	December 17, 1993	House show	Fall Branch, Tennessee	2	210		
9	Alex Shane and Eddie Golden	July 15, 1994	House show	Fall Branch, Tennessee	1	22		
10	Mike Powers and Alabama Heartthrob	August 6, 1994	House show	Kingsport, Tennessee	1	70		
11	Steve Flynn and Bobby B.	September 17, 1994	SSW	Fall Branch, Tennessee	1	42		
12	Beau James and The Hornet	October 15, 1994	House show	Fall Branch, Tennessee	1	119		
13	Danny Christian (3) and Eddie Bruiser	February 1, 1995	House show	Duffield, Virginia	1	2		
14	Beau James (2) and The War Machine	February 3, 1995	House show	Duffield, Virginia	1	14		
15	Danny Christian (4) and Eddie Bruiser	February 17, 1995	House show	Fall Branch, Tennessee	2	29		
16	Death Riders (Chic White and Tennessee Equalizer)	March 17, 1995	SSW	Fall Branch, Tennessee	3	63		
17	The Young Guns (Scott Sterling and Jeff Lovin)	May 19, 1995	House show	Fall Branch, Tennessee	2	84		
18	Death Riders (Chic White and Tennessee Equalizer)	August 11, 1995	House show	Fall Branch, Tennessee	4	19		
19	The Young Guns (Scott Sterling and Jeff Lovin)	August 30, 1995	House show	Tazewell, Tennessee	3	5		
20	Death & Destruction (Frank Parker and Roger Anderson)	September 4, 1995	SSW	Fall Branch, Tennessee	1	88		
21	Beau James (3) and Dan Cooley	December 1, 1995	SSW	Fall Branch, Tennessee	1	1		
22	Death & Destruction (Frank Parker and Roger Anderson)	December 2, 1995	SSW	Princeton, West Virginia	2	7		
23	Beau James (4) and Ricky Morton	December 9, 1995	SSW	Ledger, North Carolina	1	27		
24	Beautiful Blonds (Eddie Golden (2) and Stan Lee)	January 5, 1996	SSW	Fall Branch, Tennessee	1	42		
25	Death & Destruction (Frank Parker and Roger Anderson)	February 16, 1996	SSW	Fall Branch, Tennessee	3	48		
26	The Fantastic Express (Ricky Morton (2) and Bobby Fulton)	April 4, 1996	SSW	Johnson City, Tennessee	1	35		
27	Death & Destruction (Frank Parker and Roger Anderson)	May 9, 1996	SSW	Johnson City, Tennessee	4	116		
28	Scott Sterling (4) and Dan Cooley (2)	September 2, 1996	House show	Fall Branch, Tennessee	1	149		
29	Death Riders (Chic White and Tennessee Equalizer)	October 5, 1996	SSW	Fall Branch, Tennessee	5	14		
30	Scott Sterling (5) and Dan Cooley (3)	October 19, 1996	SSW	Fall Branch, Tennessee	2	35		
31	Justin St. John and Steve Flynn (2)	November 23, 1996	SSW	Revere, Massachusetts	1	41		
32	Danny Christian (5) and Johnny Thunder	January 3, 1997	SSW	Fall Branch, Tennessee	1	49	Butch Black substituted Steve Flynn due to Flynn suffering an injury.	
33	Beau James (5) and The War Machine (2)	February 21, 1997	House show	Wytheville, Virginia	2	133		
34	Death & Destruction (Frank Parker and Roger Anderson)	July 4, 1997	SSW The Famous Final Scene	Fall Branch, Tennessee	5	106		
35	Legends (Beau James (6) and K. C. Thunder)	October 18, 1997	SSW	Mountain City, Tennessee	1	62		
36	Death & Destruction (Frank Parker and Roger Anderson)	December 19, 1997	SSW	Fall Branch, Tennessee	6	100		
37	Mike Cooper and Super Masked Man	March 20, 1998	SSW	Fall Branch, Tennessee	1	14		
38	Chuck Jones and Roger Ham	April 3, 1998	SSW	Fall Branch, Tennessee	1	14	This was a 2-on-1 handicap match in which Jones defeated Mike Cooper and Super Masked Man alone. He later chose Roger Ham as his tag team partner.	
39	The Brooklyn Bad Boys (Brooklyn Bad Boy #1 & Brooklyn Bad Boy #2)	April 17, 1998	SSW	Fall Branch, Tennessee	1	267	This was a 2-on-1 handicap match in which Chuck Jones faced The Brooklyn Boys alone. It is uncertain if Ham legitimately held the titles with Jones, but cagematch.net shows Ham's presence in the team.	
40	The Christian Brothers (Bam Bam Christian (4) and Danny Christian (6))	January 9, 1999	House show	Mountain City, Tennessee	3	21		
41	Death & Destruction (Frank Parker and Roger Anderson)	January 30, 1999	SSW Little K-Town Showdown	Kingsport, Tennessee	7	85		
42	The Christian Brothers (Bam Bam Christian (5) and Danny Christian (7))	April 25, 1999	House show	Kingsport, Tennessee	4	76		
43	Steve Flynn (3) and K. C. Thunder (2)	July 10, 1999	House show	Kingsport, Tennessee	1	40	This was a three-way tag team match also involving Frank Parker and Roger Anderson.	
—	Vacated	August 19, 1999	SSW Big Orange Brawl	Kingsport, Tennessee	—	—	Beau James substituted K. C. Thunder in a title defence against Frank Parker and Roger Anderson. The titles were declared vacated after a controversial ending of the match.	
44	Death & Destruction (Frank Parker and Roger Anderson)	October 30, 1999	House show	Kingsport, Tennessee	8	33	Defeated The Memphis Bodyguards (Beau James and Bruiser Graham) to win the vacant titles. The length of this reign is uncertain due to some documentations stating that somewhere in November there was a short vacancy of the titles. Cagematch.net recognizes Parker's and Anderson's reign as uninterrupted.	
45	The Rock 'n' Roll Express (Ricky Morton (2) and Ricky Harrison)	December 2, 1999	House show	Kingsport, Tennessee	1	72	Although Harrison was not part of The Rock 'n' Roll Express, certain documentations present him as part of the team.	
46	Beau James (7) and Buddy Landel	February 12, 2000	House show	Kingsport, Tennessee	1	36		
47	Ricky Harrison (2) and Iron Cross	March 9, 2000	House show	Saltville, Virginia	1	188		
48	Legends (Beau James (8) and K. C. Thunder (3))	September 13, 2000	House show	Saltville, Virginia	2	17-48	The exact length of this reign is uncertain.	
49	Something Else (John Noble and Eddie Browning)	October 2000	House show	Kingsport, Tennessee	1	87-118	The exact length of this reign is uncertain.	
50	Legends (Beau James (9) and K. C. Thunder (4))	January 26, 2001	House show	Kingsport, Tennessee	3	53		
51	The Batten Twins (Bart Batten and Brad Batten)	March 20, 2001	House show	Kingsport, Tennessee	1	73		
52	The High Flyers (Andy Douglas and Kelly Charles)	June 1, 2001	House show	Kingsport, Tennessee	1	63		
53	The Batten Twins (Bart Batten and Brad Batten)	August 3, 2001	House show	Kingsport, Tennessee	2	85	This was a 2-on-1 handicap match in which Douglas defended the titles alone due to Charles failing to appear. The match was co-hosted by SSW and MECW at the Kingsport Armory.	
54	Steve Flynn (4) and K. C. Thunder (5)	October 27, 2001	House show	Kingsport, Tennessee	2	258		
55	Beau James (10) and Brian Overbay	July 17, 2002	House show	Kingsport, Tennessee	1	46	Roger Anderson substituted Steve Flynn in this title defence. The show was held at the Civic Auditorium instead of the Armory which was the main venue of the promotion at the time.	
56	Scotty McKeever and Jesse Taylor	September 1, 2002	House show	Kingsport, Tennessee	1	58		
57	Beau James (11) and Brian Overbay (2)	October 29, 2002	House show	Kingsport, Tennessee	2	30		
58	The Blond Bombers (Thorn Baldwin and Tim Baldwin)	November 28, 2002	House show	Kingsport, Tennessee	1	114		
—	Vacated	March 8, 2003	House show	Kingsport, Tennessee	—	—	Titles were vacated after Tim Baldwin suffered an injury.	
59	The Batten Twins (Bart Batten and Brad Batten)	March 22, 2003	House show	Kingsport, Tennessee	3	165	Defeated Beau James and Gator McAllister in a tournament final to win the vacant titles.	
60	The Blond Bombers (Thorn Baldwin and Tim Baldwin)	September 3, 2003	House show	Kingsport, Tennessee	2	296	The exact length of the reign is uncertain due to cagematch.de stating that the reign began on September 4.	
61	Super Destroyer and Josh Cody	June 25, 2004	House show	Kingsport, Tennessee	1	194		
62	Robbie Cassidy and Tony Givens	January 5, 2005	House show	Kingsport, Tennessee	1	17	The exact length of the reign is uncertain due to cagematch.de stating that the reign began on September 18, 2004.	
63	Super Destroyer and Josh Cody	January 22, 2005	House show	Kingsport, Tennessee	2	41		
64	Robbie Cassidy and Tony Givens	March 4, 2005	House show	Kingsport, Tennessee	2	7		
65	Nick Hammonds and Wayne Adkins	March 11, 2005	House show	Kingsport, Tennessee	1	36		
66	Beau James (12) and Super Destroyer (3)	April 9, 2005	House show	Kingsport, Tennessee	1	14		
67	Legends (Beau James (13) and K. C. Thunder (6))	April 23, 2005	House show	Kingsport, Tennessee	4	146	Super Destroyer relinquished one half of the tag titles and was immediately replaced by K. C. Thunder.	
68	Ricky Morton and Wayne Adkins (2)	September 16, 2005	House show	Kingsport, Tennessee	1	8		
69	Jowad Wayne and Wayne Adkins (3)	September 24, 2005	House show	Kingsport, Tennessee	1	29	Adkins betrayed Ricky Morton and he chose Jowad Wayne as a new tag team partner. The previous reign was not followed by any vacancy.	
70	Adam York and Thorn (3)	October 15, 2005	House show	Kingsport, Tennessee	1	42	Thorn was previously known as Thorn Baldwin.	
—	Vacated	November 26, 2005	—	—	—	—		
71	KMF Inc. (Chris Richards and Steve Fury)	March 3, 2006	House show	Kingsport, Tennessee	1	202		
72	Robbie Cassidy and Tony Givens	September 21, 2006	House show	Kingsport, Tennessee	3	156		
73	Chris Richards (2) and Wayne Adkins (4)	February 24, 2007	House show	Kingsport, Tennessee	1	141		
74	Robbie Cassidy and Tony Givens	July 15, 2007	House show	Kingsport, Tennessee	4	<1		
—	Vacated	July 15, 2007	House show	Kingsport, Tennessee	—	—	Titles were vacated under unknown circumstances.	
75	Moe Jenkins and Nick Hammonds (2)	2008	House show	Kingsport, Tennessee	1	N/A	The exact lengths of this reign and of the previous vacancy are uncertain.	
76	John Noble (2) and Earl Fields	2009	House show	Kingsport, Tennessee	1	N/A	The exact length of this reign is uncertain.	
77	Bulldog Mac and Iron Cross (2)	November 25, 2010	SSW 19th Annual Thanksgiving Night Extravaganza	Kingsport, Tennessee	1	N/A	The exact length of this reign is uncertain.	
—	Vacated	2011	—	—	—	—	Titles were vacated under unknown circumstances.	
78	Jake Booth and Ray Idol	April 18, 2014	House show	Rogersville, Tennessee	1	N/A	The exact length of this reign is uncertain.	
—	Vacated	N/A	—	—	—	—	Titles were vacated under unknown circumstances. They were inactive for almost 5 years.	
79	Shawn Cruz and The Mega Destroyer	July 6, 2019	SSW	Gray, Tennessee	1	2,091+	Defeated Beau James and JR Martin in a tournament final to win the reactivated titles.	

=== Combined reigns ===
†	Indicates the current champion
¤	The exact length of at least one title reign is uncertain, so the shortest length is considered.

Rank	Team	No. of reigns	Combined days
1	Death & Destruction (Frank Parker and Roger Anderson)	8	578
2	Death Riders (Chic White and Tennessee Equalizer)	5	526
3	Wayne Rogers and George Hiatt	1	517
4	Shawn Cruz and The Mega Destroyer †	1	2,091+
5	The Blond Bombers (Thorn and Tim Baldwin)	2	410
6	The Batten Twins (Bart Batten and Brad Batten)	3	323
7	Steve Flynn and K. C. Thunder	2	298
8	Legends (Beau James and K. C. Thunder)	4	278-309¤
9	The Brooklyn Bad Boys (Brooklyn Bad Boy #1 & Brooklyn Bad Boy #2)	1	267
10	The Young Guns (Scott Sterling and Jeff Lovin)	3	266
11	Super Destroyer and Josh Cody	2	235
12	The Christian Brothers (Bam Bam Christian and Danny Christian)	4	215
13	KMF Inc. (Chris Richards and Steve Fury)	1	202
14	Ricky Harrison and Iron Cross	1	188
15	Scott Sterling and Dan Cooley	2	184
16	Robbie Cassidy and Tony Givens	4	180
17	Beau James and The War Machine	2	147
18	Chris Richards and Wayne Adkins	1	141
19	The Regulators (Stone and Steel)	1	124
20	Beau James and The Hornet	1	119
21	Something Else (John Noble and Eddie Browning)	1	87-118¤
22	Beau James and Brian Overbay	2	76
23	The Rock 'n' Roll Express (Ricky Morton and Ricky Harrison)	1	72
24	Mike Powers and Alabama Heartthrob	1	70
25	The High Flyers (Andy Douglas and Kelly Charles)	1	63
26	Scotty McKeever and Jesse Taylor	1	58
27	Danny Christian and Johnny Thunder	1	49
28	Adam York and Thorn	1	42
28	Beautiful Blonds (Eddie Golden and Stan Lee)	1	42
28	Steve Flynn and Bobby B.	1	42
31	Justin St. John and Steve Flynn	1	41
32	Beau James and Buddy Landel	1	36
32	Nick Hammonds and Wayne Adkins	1	36
34	The Fantastic Express (Ricky Morton and Bobby Fulton)	1	35
35	Danny Christian and Eddie Bruiser	2	31
36	Jowad Wayne and Wayne Adkins	1	29
37	Beau James and Ricky Morton	1	27
38	Alex Shane and Eddie Golden	1	22
39	G.Q. Stratus and Jimmy Golden	1	17
40	Beau James and Super Destroyer	1	14
40	Chuck Jones and Roger Ham	1	14
40	Mike Cooper and Super Masked Man	1	14
43	Ricky Morton and Wayne Adkins	1	8
44	Beau James and Dan Cooley	1	1

=== By wrestler ===
Rank	Wrestler	No. of reigns	Combined days
1	Beau James	13	636-667¤
2	Frank Parker	8	578
2	Roger Anderson	8	578
4	K. C. Thunder	6	576-607¤
5	Chic White	5	526
5	Tennessee Equalizer	5	526
7	Wayne Rogers	1	517
7	George Hiatt	1	517
9	Shawn Cruz †	1	2,091+
9	The Mega Destroyer †	1	2,091+
11	Thorn Baldwin/Thorn	3	452
12	Scott Sterling	5	450
13	Tim Baldwin	2	410
14	Steve Flynn	4	381
15	Chris Richards	2	343
16	Bart Batten	3	323
16	Brad Batten	3	323
18	Danny Christian	7	295
19	Brooklyn Bad Boy #1	1	267
19	Brooklyn Bad Boy #2	1	267
21	Jeff Lovin	3	266
22	Super Destroyer	3	264
23	Ricky Harrison	2	260
24	Josh Cody	2	235
25	Bam Bam Christian	4	215
26	Wayne Adkins	4	214
27	Steve Fury	1	202
28	Iron Cross	2	188¤
29	Dan Cooley	3	185
30	Robbie Cassidy	4	180
30	Tony Givens	4	180
32	The War Machine	2	147
33	Ricky Morton	4	142
34	Stone	1	124
34	Steel	1	124
36	The Hornet	1	119
37	John Noble	2	>87-118¤
37	Eddie Browning	1	87-118¤
39	Brian Overbay	2	76
40	Mike Powers	1	70
40	Alabama Heartthrob	1	70
42	Eddie Golden	2	64
43	Andy Douglas	1	63
43	Kelly Charles	1	63
45	Scotty McKeever	1	58
45	Jesse Taylor	1	58
47	Johnny Thunder	1	49
48	Adam York	1	42
48	Bobby B.	1	42
48	Stan Lee	1	42
51	Justin St. John	1	41
52	Nick Hammonds	2	36¤
52	Buddy Landel	1	36
54	Bobby Fulton	1	35
55	Eddie Bruiser	2	31
56	Jowad Wayne	1	29
57	Alex Shane	1	22
58	G.Q. Stratus	1	17
58	Jimmy Golden	1	17
60	Chuck Jones	1	14
60	Mike Cooper	1	14
60	Roger Ham	1	14
60	Super Masked Man	1	14
64	Bulldog Mac	1	N/A¤
64	Earl Fields	1	N/A¤
64	Jake Booth	1	N/A¤
64	Moe Jenkins	1	N/A¤
64	Ray Idol	1	N/A¤
