= SSW Appalachian Heavyweight Championship =

Professional wrestling championship\

Details
- Promotion: Southern States Wrestling
- Date established: May 11, 1996
- Date retired: 2017
Statistics
- First champion(s): Beau James
- Final champion(s): Stan Sierra
- Most reigns: Beau James (4)
- Longest reign: Chuck Jones (361 days)
- Shortest reign: The Fall Branch Redneck (<1 days)

The Southern States Wrestling (SSW) Appalachian Heavyweight Championship is a secondary professional wrestling tag team championship in Southern States Wrestling. It was first won by Beau James who defeated Tracey Smothers in a best-of-three matches in Meadowview, Virginia on May 11, 1996. The title is generally defended in the Southern United States, most often in its home base in East Tennessee, but has been defended in Virginia and West Virginia. There are 14 recognized champions with a total of 25 title reigns.

== Title history ==
Wrestler:	Times:	Date:	Location:	Notes:
Beau James	1	May 11, 1996	Meadowview, Virginia	Defeated Tracey Smothers in a best-of-three matches to become the first champion.
Scott Sterling	1	May 31, 1996	Pennington Gap, Virginia	
Beau James	2	July 5, 1996	Fall Branch, Tennessee	
The War Machine	1	December 21, 1996	Beckley, West Virginia	
Beau James	3	January 17, 1997	Fall Branch, Tennessee	Awarded the title via forfeit when The War Machine failed to appear.
Danny Christian	1	July 18, 1997	Fall Branch, Tennessee	
Brooklyn Bad Boy #1	1	November 14, 1997	Fall Branch, Tennessee	Won in a "Loser Leaves Town" match.
The Fall Branch Redneck	2	January 16, 1998	Fall Branch, Tennessee	The Fall Branch Redneck, secretly Danny Christian, is stripped of the title after the match when he refuses to reveal his identity. The title is returned to Brooklyn Bad Boy #1.
Brooklyn Bad Boy #1	2	February 20, 1998		Awarded title via forfeit.
Brooklyn Bad Boy #2	1	March 6, 1998	Fall Branch, Tennessee	
Brooklyn Bad Boy #1	3	March 20, 1998	Fall Branch, Tennessee	Won in a "Loser Leaves Town" match.
Danny Christian	3	April 10, 1998	Fall Branch, Tennessee	Wins in a "Title on a Pole" match.
Title is held-up following a match between Danny Christian and Steve Flynn in which both men scored a double pin.'
Steve Flynn	1	April 24, 1998	Fall Branch, Tennessee	
Iron Cross	1	January 30, 1999	Kingsport, Tennessee	
The War Machine	2	May 8, 1999	Kingsport, Tennessee	
Ricky Harrison	1	July 10, 1999	Kingsport, Tennessee	
Chuck Jones	1	August 7, 1999	Kingsport, Tennessee	
Ricky Harrison	2	October 30, 1999	Kingsport, Tennessee	
Chuck Jones	2	November 4, 1999	Johnson City, Tennessee	
Porkchop Thomas	1	October 30, 2000	Kingsport, Tennessee	
Bryan Wayne	1	June 2001	Kingsport, Tennessee	
Flex Armstrong	1	October 2001	Kingsport, Tennessee	
Ricky Harrison	3	January 2002	Mountain City, Tennessee	
Beau James	4	February 27, 2002	Kingsport, Tennessee	
Title is retired in 2002.'
Eric Darkstorm	1	April 23, 2004	Greenville, Tennessee	Defeated Super Destroyer to win the newly reinstated title.
