= Independent Professional Wrestling Alliance =

Virginian independent professional wrestling circuit

- Acronym: IPWA
- Founded: 1995
- Defunct: 2001
- Style: Rasslin'
- Headquarters: Alexandria, Virginia, U.S.
- Founder(s): Cueball Carmichael; Kevin Carson
- Owner(s): Cueball Carmichael (1995–2001); Kevin Carson (1995–2001)
- Website: Official website

The Independent Professional Wrestling Alliance (IPWA, sometimes shortened to the Independent Pro Wrestling Alliance) was an American independent professional wrestling promotion that held events in the Mid-Atlantic and Southeastern United States, especially in the Carolinas and Virginia, from October 1995 to February 2001, when it was run by Cueball Carmichael and Kevin Carson. The promotion was based in Chincoteague Island, Virginia, with offices in Alexandria and Fairfax, Virginia.

It was the first successful independent promotion in the region, along with W.D. Woody's Ultimate Championship Wrestling, rivaling long-running territory-era promoters Mike and Denny Million (All-American Wrestling), Bob Ross (American Championship Wrestling), and James Wells (North American Wrestling Alliance) during the mid-to late 1990s.

The promotion featured a number of independent stars during its six years in operation including Johnny Gunn, Jimmy Cicero, Lance Diamond, Corporal Punishment, Julio Sanchez, Steve Corino, Adam Flash, and Death & Destruction (Frank Parker & Roger Anderson). One-time NWA regional star Buddy Landel and The Headbangers (Headbanger Mosh & Headbanger Thrasher) from the World Wrestling Federation were also regulars during the IPWA's early years. In addition, its wrestling school, run by Carmichael and Jimmy Cicero, was responsible for training Jacey North, Otto Schwanz, and The Bad Street Boys (Joey Matthews and Christian York).

== History ==
=== Formation ===
The Independent Professional Wrestling Alliance was founded by independent wrestlers Cueball Carmichael and Kevin Carson in the fall of 1995. Its first show was held on October 9, 1995, at the National Guard Armory in Manassas, Virginia where Carmichael won a battle royal to become the promotion's first heavyweight champion; Death & Destruction (Frank Parker & Roger Anderson) also defeated American Patriot and Kevin Dillon to become the first IPWA Tag Team Champions. The promotion crowned its first light heavyweight champion nine months later when Mark "The Shark" Shrader defeated Quinn Nash (substituting for Earl the Pearl) in a tournament final in Alexandria on June 7, 1996.

Carmichael, who would go on to win the IPWA Heavyweight Championship a record 4-times, engaged in a long-running feud with Johnny Gunn over the belt for much of the promotion's history. Their rivalry started during Carmichael's first title reign when, on March 9, 1996, Gunn attacked the champion with a steel chair shortly after a successful title defense against The Iron Sheik. Their match a month later saw Gunn beat Carmichael following a 32 minute bout; sometime during the match, 22-year-old fan Danelle Evans stole the heavyweight title but it was later recovered by local police.

=== Territorial reach ===
Within a few years, the IPWA had established itself as the states' first successful independent promotion along with rival W.D. Woody and Ultimate Championship Wrestling based in Hillsville, Virginia. Though there were a number of short-lived promotions both prior to and during this period, it was these two organizations which were the biggest rivals of longtime territory-era promotions Bob Ross' American Championship Wrestling (1978-), James Wells' North American Wrestling Alliance (1980–2000), and Mike and Denny Million's All-American Wrestling (1988–1996) throughout the decade.

The IPWA was primarily based in Chincoteague Island and northeastern Virginia, with offices in Alexandria and Fairfax, during its six-year history. It eventually ran shows in areas of the Mid-Atlantic and Southeastern United States formerly promoted by the National Wrestling Alliance; among the cities and towns it visited included Richmond and Woodbridge, Virginia, Goldsboro, Kinston, Lenoir and Pikeville, North Carolina, and Washington, Pennsylvania.

=== Notable talent ===
The promotion's owners, Cueball Carmichael and Kevin Carson, were able to bring in many independent and regional stars. Its close proximity to other promotions farther up the East Coast allowed the IPWA to feature stars from the Mid-Eastern Wrestling Federation, Steel City Wrestling, and to a certain extent Extreme Championship Wrestling. Among its mainstays included Johnny Gunn, Jimmy Cicero, Lance Diamond, Corporal Punishment, Adam Flash, C. W. Anderson, Jason Knight, Stevie Richards, Axl Rotten, Frank Stalletto, The Bad Street Boys (Joey Matthews and Christian York), Darkside (Glen Osbourne and Rockin' Rebel), and Death & Destruction (Frank Parker & Roger Anderson). Dan Severn, a former NWA World Heavyweight Champion, wrestled occasional shows.

Older stars from the NWA and World Wrestling Federation also made frequent appearances including Tully Blanchard, Demolition Ax, King Kong Bundy, Jim "The Anvil" Neidhart, The Iron Sheik, Virgil, Nikolai Volkoff, and Buddy Landel, the latter holding the IPWA Heavyweight Championship. Bam Bam Bigelow, Disco Inferno, Doink the Clown and The Headbangers (Headbanger Mosh & Headbanger Thrasher) also made frequent appearances during the mid-to late 1990s. Its wrestling school, founded in 1998, was run by Carmichael, Jimmy Cicero, and Christian York; among Carmichael's former students included York, Joey Mercury, Jacey North, Otto Schwanz, and "American" Mike Brown. Carmichael and Carson were later featured with one of their protégés, U.S. Marine Matt Griffin, by The Free Lance–Star.

Its light heavyweight division, in particular, counted Mark Shrader, Duane Gill, Julio Sanchez, Steve Corino, Jacey North, and both members of The Bad Street Boys. It was while feuding with York that Joey Matthews won the IPWA Light Heavyweight Championship from his tag team partner on January 9, 1999. The promotion also had a small but modest women's division mostly consisting of its own female wrestlers but also included Brandi Wine, Debbie Combs, and Malia Hosaka.

=== Controversy ===
On April 12, 1997, a scheduled IPWA benefit show for the Chantilly High School in Fairfax County, Virginia, was abruptly cancelled by the school district following a complaint by Andy Shallal of Fairfax County's diversity training program. Shallal, then head of the Board of Education's human relations advisory committee, initially became aware of the show after receiving a promotional flier from a parent at the school. Upon viewing the flier, which featured photos of Salvatore Sincere, "Wiseguy" Jimmy Cicero, and Doink the Clown, he objected to the show on the grounds of "ethnic stereotyping". Shallal, himself an Arab-American and member of the American-Arab Anti-Discrimination Committee (ADC), specifically pointed to the show's main event which featured WWF Hall of Famer The Iron Sheik in a handicap match against two midget wrestlers. A day before the show, only 27 hours to bell time, co-owner Kevin Carson received a faxed letter from the school's assistant principal Tammy Turner that "the [Fairfax] school system will not permit this event to take place on school system property."

The event was intended to have been a class project and school fundraiser for marketing students at Chantilly High, then having won local and state competitions, with the proceeds being used to fund student travel expenses for a Distributive Education Clubs of America (DECA) leadership conference in Anaheim, California. The students were involved in advertising the event, which included designing and selling the fliers in question, and were to have worked at the show. Shallal defended his actions maintaining that those attending the event should not be exposed to negative stereotypes and expressed the view that "[the students have] been sensitized to the issue of multi-culturalism and diversity". The school official had planned to lead a protest at the event if it had gone ahead. In a later interview with the Washington Post, Shallal stated that he was "pleased by the cancellation" adding that he was "sorry it had to take this long to come to what should have been an obvious solution."

The promotion responded by filing a lawsuit on behalf of the IPWA against the Fairfax County School Board and Chantilly High School Principal Dale Rumberger in September 1997. Both Carmichael and Kevin Carson claimed that the IPWA had lost $15,000 as a result of a breach of contract by school officials and sought compensation; the last-minute cancellation forced the two promoters to cancel talent, travel plans, equipment and lodging for local and out-of-state performers. They claimed to have attempted to accommodate the school's initial complaint with The Iron Sheik's involvement, which Shallal claimed promoted anti-Arab and anti-Iranian sentiments, by dropping the wrestler from the show. A second complaint filed by Shallal and the ADC over midget wrestling, however, caused the school to cancel both the fundraiser and a second future show at Fairfax High School. As part of its lawsuit, the promotion cited that it had previously attracted an audience of 950 at Fairfax High in December 1995.

=== Cross-promotional shows ===
IPWA enjoyed a close working relationship with other regional promotions on the East Coast, most especially, Mid-Eastern Wrestling Federation in Maryland. Its use of MEWF talent sometimes saw feuds and storylines carry over into the Virginia promotion. It not only acknowledged MEWF champions but could also affect the IPWA's champions as well. For example, the inaugural IPWA Light Heavyweight Champion Mark Shrader was forced to surrender the belt after winning the MEWF Heavyweight Championship from Axl Rotten on September 13, 1996. Earlier that year, MEWF Tag Team Champions Darkside (Glen Osbourne and Rockin' Rebel) defeated IPWA Tag Team Champions Death & Destruction (Frank Parker and Roger Anderson) in a "champions vs. champions" match to win both titles. On October 26, 1996, an IPWA/MEWF interpromotional show was held at its home arena, the Secret Cove, in Alexandria, Virginia, which saw Joey Matthews wrestle then MEWF Light Heavyweight Champion Steve Corino and MEWF Heavyweight Champion Mark Shrader defeat Corporal Punishment. Also on the card, Lucifer and "Hollywood" Bob Starr fought each other in a taped-fist match.

Two years later, on May 15, 1999, the IPWA participated in the Break the Barrier supercard at Philadelphia's ECW Arena in what was one of the largest interpromotional events ever held in the United States; representing the promotion, IPWA Heavyweight Champion Cueball Carmichael successfully defended his title against Julio Sanchez.

=== Final years ===
In August 1998, the IPWA left their longtime home arena, the Secret Cove, in Alexandria, Virginia. The promotion had run regular shows there for nearly three years. It was unexpectedly dropped in favor of what turned out to be a one-time event held by the MEWF in November 1996 followed by a nine-month run by its rival Ultimate Championship Wrestling. Returning to the Secret Cove in the fall of 1997, a decision was eventually made to leave in favor of a bigger venue in northern Virginia though it continued to use a 700-seat facility in Chincoteague. Declining business, however, would force the IPWA's eventual close, along with many other local independents, by the spring of 2001. A few years later, on March 22, 2008, the IPWA held a reunion show in Sewell, New Jersey featuring many of its former stars, most notably, including Buddy Landell and King Kong Bundy.

== Championships ==
Championship	Notes
IPWA Heavyweight Championship	The heavyweight title of the IPWA. It was established in 1995 and continued to be defended within the promotion until 2001.
IPWA Tag Team Championship	The tag team title of the IPWA. It was established in 1995 and continued to be defended until 2001.
IPWA Light Heavyweight Championship	The light heavyweight title of the IPWA. The title was established in 1996 and continued to be defended until 2001.
IPWA Ladies Championship	The women's wrestling title of the IPWA, it was established in 1999 and defended through the year.
