= IPWA Tag Team Championship =

Professional wrestling tag team championship

Details
- Promotion: Independent Professional Wrestling Alliance
- Date established: October 9, 1995
- Date retired: 2001
Statistics
- First champion(s): Death & Destruction (Frank Parker and Roger Anderson)
- Final champion(s): Jimmy Cicero and Cueball Carmichael (won January 23, 1999)
- Most reigns: Death & Destruction (3)
- Longest reign: Death & Destruction (292 days)
- Shortest reign: Big Slam and Chris Stephenson (14 days)

The IPWA Tag Team Championship was a professional wrestling tag team championship in the Independent Professional Wrestling Alliance (IPWA). The inaugural champions were Death & Destruction (Frank Parker and Roger Anderson), who defeated the American Patriot and Kevin Dillon in Manassas, Virginia on October 10, 1995 to become the first IPWA Tag Team Champions.

There were six officially recognized champions with Death & Destruction winning the championship a record three-times. They also held the record for longest-reigning champions at 292 days. Several notable tag teams wrestled for the championship during its near six-year history with former champions including Darkside (Glen Osbourne and Rockin' Rebel), The Headbangers (Mosh and Thrasher), and Steve Corino and Adam Flash.

== Title history ==
#	Order in reign history
Reign	The reign number for the specific set of wrestlers listed
Event	The event in which the title was won
—	Used for vacated reigns so as not to count it as an official reign
N/A	The information is not available or is unknown
+	Indicates the current reign is changing daily

=== Names ===
Name	Years
IPWA Tag Team Championship	1995 — 2001

=== Reigns ===
#	Wrestlers	Reign	Date	Days held	Location	Event	Notes	Ref.
1	Death & Destruction (Frank Parker and Roger Anderson)	1	October 9, 1995	292	Manassas, Virginia	IPWA Debut Show (1995)	Death & Destruction defeated American Patriot and Kevin Dillon to become the first IPWA Tag Team Champion.	
2	The Fraternity (Brian Perry and Sean Powers)	1	N/A	N/A	N/A	N/A		
3	Death & Destruction (Frank Parker and Roger Anderson)	2	March 9, 1996	N/A	Alexandria, Virginia	Live event		
4	Darkside (Glen Osbourne and Rockin' Rebel)	1	July 27, 1996	N/A	Alexandria, Virginia	Live event	This was a "champions vs. champions" match. As a result of their victory, Darkside held both the IPWA and MEWF Tag Team Championships.	
5	The Headbangers (Mosh and Thrasher)	2	1996	N/A	N/A	N/A		
6	Lethal Weapon (Steve Corino and Adam Flash)	1	January 19, 1997	62	Washington, Pennsylvania	Live event		
7	Death & Destruction (Frank Parker and Roger Anderson)	3	March 22, 1997	N/A	Kinston, North Carolina	Live event		
—	Vacated	—	May 1997	—	N/A	N/A		
8	Jimmy Cicero and Cueball Carmichael	1	September 2, 1998	129	Richmond, Virginia	Live event	Jimmy Cicero and Cueball Carmichael defeated Shorty Smalls and "Big" Dan Rage to win the vacant championship.	
9	Big Slam and Chris Stephenson	1	January 9, 1999	14	Chincoteague, Virginia	Live event		
10	Jimmy Cicero and Cueball Carmichael	2	January 23, 1999	N/A	Woodbridge, Virginia	Live event		
—	Deactivated	—	2001	—	N/A	N/A	The IPWA ceases promoting events and closes in the spring of 2001.	

== List of combined reigns ==
<1	Indicates that the reign lasted less than one day.

Rank (Note: Each reign is ranked highest to lowest; reigns with the same number mean that they are tied for that certain rank.)	Wrestler	# of reigns	Combined days
1	Death & Destruction (Frank Parker and Roger Anderson)	3	292+
2	Jimmy Cicero and Cueball Carmichael	2	129+
3	Steve Corino and Adam Flash)	1	62
4	Big Slam and Chris Stephenson)	1	14
