= Marianna Komlos =

Canadian bodybuilder (1969-2004)

Personal information
- Born: September 3, 1969 Kitimat, British Columbia, Canada
- Died: September 26, 2004 (aged 35) Vancouver, Canada
- Spouse: Paul Lazenby (m. 2004)

Professional wrestling career
- Ring name(s): Marianna; Mrs. Cleavage
- Billed height: 5 ft 4 in (1.63 m)
- Billed weight: 135 lb (61 kg)
- Debut: 1999
- Retired: 2000

Marianna Komlos (September 3, 1969 – September 26, 2004) was a Canadian bodybuilder, fitness model and professional wrestling manager. She is perhaps best known for her stint in World Wrestling Federation in 1999 as Marianna and "Mrs. Cleavage", where she was the Manager for a wrestler known as "Beaver Cleavage", a parody of the TV show Leave It to Beaver. Following the termination of the Beaver Cleavage gimmick in a scripted 'storm out' by Charles Warrington due to the absurdity of the gimmick, Marianna was portrayed as the girlfriend of Warrington (now with no gimmick), going by the name of 'Chaz'.

== Bodybuilding career ==
Before she started bodybuilding, Komlos weighed as much as 197 pounds (89 kg). Komlos started competing in provincial contests in 1993, and eventually won the middleweight class at the British Columbia Championships in 1997.

Komlos appeared on the covers of many fitness magazines including Muscle & Fitness (September 1997), Flex (November 1997), Women's Physique World (December 1997), and Natural Bodybuilding & Fitness. Komlos is of Greek extraction.

=== Contest history ===
- 1996 Gators Classic (Vancouver, BC) – 1st (LW and overall)
- 1997 British Columbia Championship – 1st (MW) and Best Poser
- 1997 Women's Extravaganza – 1st (MW)

== Professional wrestling career ==
She made her debut in the World Wrestling Federation in May 1999. She was given the gimmick of Mrs. Cleavage as a valet, being the mother (kayfabe) of Beaver Cleavage, a reference to the TV series Leave It to Beaver. The two would exchange sexual innuendos (e.g. Mrs. Cleavage would offer Beaver some of "Mother's milk" when he complained that his cereal was dry). The gimmick was quickly scrapped (via a 'worked shoot' promo in which Beaver supposedly gave up on the character), and retailored.

On June 28, Beaver now calling himself Chaz, ridiculed the Beaver Cleavage gimmick and identified Mrs. Cleavage as his girlfriend, Marianna Komlos, in a shoot-style interview. Chaz and Komlos feuded with Meat and his female entourage, then with Prince Albert. Warrington left Komlos on the September 12 episode of Sunday Night Heat, and she begged him to take her back throughout the night. The following night on Raw is War, Komlos came to ringside with a black eye, and it was implied that Chaz had beaten her. Six days later on Sunday Night Heat, during Chaz's match with Mideon, Komlos would make her way to ringside with two police officers causing a distracted Chaz to lose the match. The officers would then proceed to lead Chaz away.

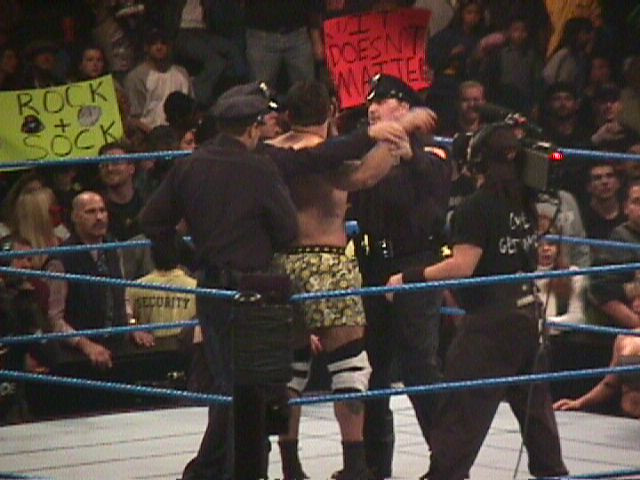
Chaz is arrested by Marianna's policemen during an episode of WWF Sunday Night Heat on October 10, 1999

Over the following weeks, Warrington would be on the receiving end of beatdowns from various wrestlers as well as being screwed out of matches by officials, all of whom were angry at Warrington for allegedly beating Komlos. On the October 10 episode of Sunday Night Heat, Komlos attempted to have police arrest Warrington, but he was saved by the intervention of Thrasher, who showed GTV footage that demonstrated that Komlos was lying. Komlos was arrested, and the Headbangers were reformed. She was released from WWF shortly after the storyline was finished.

Komlos took a hiatus from wrestling from WWF and a year later returned to wrestling. She worked in the independent circuit in Winnipeg, Canada for No Holds Barred wrestling promotion. In her career she only wrestled two matches both on December 1, 2000 losing to Mean Mad Midget and defeating Chi Chi Cruz. She would retire from wrestling afterwards.

== Personal life ==
She married mixed martial artist and stunt performer Paul Lazenby in 2004.

Komlos died on September 26, 2004, from breast cancer at the age of 35.

== See also ==
- List of premature professional wrestling deaths
