= Southern States Wrestling =

Professional wrestling promotion in Tennessee

- Acronym: SSW
- Founded: 1991
- Style: Wrasslin'
- Headquarters: Fall Branch, Tennessee (1991-1998); Kingsport, Tennessee (1999-present)
- Founder: Beau James
- Owner: Beau James (1991-present)
- Parent: National Wrestling Alliance
- Sister: Championship Wrestling
- Formerly: NWA Championship Wrestling
- Website: SouthernStatesWrestling.com

Southern States Wrestling is an American independent professional wrestling promotion based in Kingsport, Tennessee. Founded by wrestler Beau James in early 1991, SSW (along with NWA Bluegrass) succeeded Smoky Mountain Wrestling as the top promotion in eastern Tennessee following its close. It featured a number of former SMW mainstays including Steve Flynn, Tracy Smothers, Killer Kyle, Tom Prichard, Bunkhouse Buck, Buddy Landell, The Mongolian Stomper and The Batten Twins (Bart & Brad Batten). While in the promotion, Ricky Morton teamed with longtime Fantastics rival Bobby Fulton as the Fantastic Express as well as forming a second incarnation of the Rock 'n' Roll Express with Ricky Harrison capturing the promotion's tag team title with both men.

Others to appear in the promotion have included former National Wrestling Alliance veterans Ivan Koloff, Jimmy Valiant, Junkyard Dog, Pez Whatley, Terry Taylor, Shane Douglas and female wrestlers Sherri Martel, Debbie Combs, Brandi Alexander, Lexie Fyfe and Malia Hosaka. Jillian Hall, E. Z. Money, Joey Corman and Samir and Andy Douglas. The promotion also runs a wrestling school in Fall Branch, Tennessee.

In 2015, Beau James began cutting back SSW's schedule due to his commitments to Appalachian Mountain Wrestling as manager of The Progressive Liberal, however, the promotion continued to hold events at county fairs and high school gyms. Later on in 2022, Beau James announced that SSW would resume to full time competition, with a tournament to crown a new Southern States Heavyweight Champion, a tournament won by Lord Murphy Costigan.

== History ==
Southern States Wrestling was founded by Beau James, who began promoting wrestling events in Kingsport and Fall Branch, Tennessee. The promotion crowned its first heavyweight champion when The Tennessee Equalizer defeated George Hiatt in Elizabethton, Tennessee on February 16, 1991. A junior heavyweight title was created the following year when Eddie Golden defeated Jamie Gibson in Banner Elk, North Carolina. In 1995 the promotion expanded by creating two more titles. The junior heavyweight title was abandoned the previous year and replaced by the SSW Appalachian Heavyweight Championship won by Eddie Golden when he beat Tracy Smothers in a best-of-three series in Meadowview, Virginia on May 11, 1996.

Four years later, Mike Cooper won the SSW Young Guns Television Championship in Kingsport coinciding with the promotion launching its weekly television program which aired regularly on WAPK-CA from January 1999 until October 2003. The promotion eventually released a series of dvds from the program, most notably, Superstars and Legends, Vol. 1, which featured Don Wright, Ivan Koloff, The Equalizer, Jimmy Valiant, Wahoo McDaniel, Killer Kyle, Jimmy Valiant and Stan Lee. On May 10, 2001, the promotion held the Mark Curtis Memorial Weekend of Champions in Kingsport, Tennessee in honor of World Championship Wrestling referee Mark Curtis with the proceeds donated to the Children's Miracle Network. Among those headlining the event included Arn Anderson. The next year, the Mark Curtis Memorial Weekend of Champions and Legends Reunion featured Jimmy Valiant, Ivan Koloff and Sandy Scott. Family members of the late Whitey Caldwell were also in attendance.

Southern States Wrestling became involved with AWA Superstars of Wrestling during the early-2000s, although not an official affiliate promotion, and has held interpromotional events with its sister promotion Tennessee's Championship Wrestling. In April 2005, Beau James, Tom Prichard and The Super Destroyer faced Championship Wrestling's "Adorable" Danny Ray, Nick Hammonds & Wayne Adkins at the Night of Grudges supercard at the National Guard Armory in Kingsport. This was the first interpromotional event in which both promotion's champions faced each other. In November 2006, Beau James married female wrestler Misty James at the 15th annual supercard Thanksgiving Night Spectacular at the Kingsport National Guard Armory. Both would participate in mixed tag team matches during the next year. In early 2008, he and his wife were involved in a major interpromotional feud with AWA Superstars of Wrestling World Heavyweight Champion Brian Logan.

== Southern States Wrestling Network ==
In August 2017, Beau James announced that SSW had signed a deal with a VOD service to provide online streaming platform for the promotion. It took nearly a year to transfer the entire SSW Video Library from VHS/DVD to a digital format. The Southern States Wrestling Network made its debut on July 15, 2018. In addition to SSW television and supercards, the network also has rare footage from Continental Championship Wrestling and other Territory-era wrestling promotions from the Tennessee area.

== Championships ==
=== Current champions ===
Championship	Current champion(s)	Previous champion(s)	Date won	Location
SSW Heavyweight Championship	"Sensational" Wayne Adkins	Lord Murphy Costigan	June 11th, 2023	Kingsport, TN

=== Defunct championships ===
Championship	Current champion(s)	Previous champion(s)	Date won	Location
TWA/NWA Tri-State Championship	Ryan Phoenix	August 2000	September 2004	Title is officially renamed the NWA Tri-State Championship after Tri-State Wrestling is bought by NWA Championship Wrestling in 2003.
SSW International Cup	Chris Walker	March 13, 1999	N/A	Defeated Heinrich Franz Keller in tournament final to win the International Cup.

== Kingsport Wrestling Hall of Fame ==
The Kingsport Wrestling Hall of Fame (also known as the East Tennessee Wrestling Hall of Fame) is an American professional wrestling hall of fame maintained by the Kingsport-based promotion Southern States Wrestling (SWW). It was established in 1999 to honor select personalities in East Tennessee wrestling history. The induction ceremonies are held as part of its annual "Weekend of Champions and Legends Reunion".

#	Year	Ring name (Real name)^{[a]}	Inducted by	Inducted for	Notes^{[b]}
1	1999	Sam Bass (Fred White)		Managing	
2	1999	Jim White		Wrestling	
3	1999	Don Wright		Wrestling	
4	1999	Tony Peters		Wrestling	
5	1999	Masked Superstar (Bill Eadie)		Wrestling	
1	1999	Earl Walters		Wrestling	
1	2000	Wahoo McDaniel (Edward McDaniel)		Wrestling	
2	2001	Wild Bill Canny (William F. Canny)	Ken Bowles	Wrestling	Posthumous inductee:
3	2001	Melvin Johnson	Ken Bowles	Refereeing	Longtime referee for the NWA's Tennessee and Mid-Atlantic territories
4	2001	Ron West	Jim White	Refereeing and Promoting	
5	2001	Sandy Scott (Angus Scott)	Pam Hildebrand	Wrestling	
6	2001	Buddy Landell (William Ensor)	Beau James	Wrestling	
7	2001	Arn Anderson (Martin Lunde)	Tim Horner	Wrestling	
8	2001	Ken Bowles	Beau James	Wrestling	
9	2002	Paul Steele		Wrestling	Former Tennessee state athletic commissioner
10	2002	The Spoiler (Bud Adams)		Wrestling	
11	2002	Kim Birchfield		Wrestling	
12	2002	Charlie Peters		Wrestling	
13	2002	Tim Horner		Wrestling	
14	2003	Sensational Sherri (Sherri Martel)		Managing and Wrestling	
15	2003	Fuller wrestling family		Wrestling	Posthumous inductee:
16	2003	Golden wrestling family		Wrestling	Posthumous inductee:
17	2008	The Iron Cross (Mike Samson)	Mike Cooper	Wrestling	
18	2008	Carl Fergie	Jimmy Valiant	Wrestling	
19	2008	Johnny Rich (John Richardson)	Beau James	Wrestling	
20	2008	Davey Rich (David Haskins)	Beau James	Wrestling	

== See also ==
- List of independent wrestling promotions in the United States
