= SSW Young Guns Championship =

Professional wrestling championship

SSW Young Guns Television Championship

Details
- Promotion: Southern States Wrestling
- Date established: August 10, 2000
- Date retired: 2015
Statistics
- First champion: Mike Cooper
- Final champion: Scott Sterling
- Most reigns: Ray Idol (3)
- Longest reign: Ray Idol (245 days)
- Shortest reign: Rick Karloff (3 days)

The Southern States Wrestling (SSW) Young Guns Television Championship is a secondary professional wrestling championship in Southern States Wrestling. It was first won by Mike Cooper in Kingsport, Tennessee on August 10, 2000. The title is generally defended in the Southern United States, most often in its home base in East Tennessee, but has been defended in other parts of the region as well. There are 8 recognized known teams with a total of 12 title reigns.

== Title history ==
Wrestler:	Times:	Date:	Location:	Notes:
Mike Cooper	1	August 10, 2000	Kingsport, Tennessee	
Danny DeLuccie	1	October 30, 2000	Kingsport, Tennessee	
Allen King	1	February 10, 2001	Kingsport, Tennessee	
Ray Idol	1	May 2001	Kingsport, Tennessee	
Allen King	2	August 11, 2001	Kingsport, Tennessee	
Andy Douglas	1	October 2001	Kingsport, Tennessee	
Allen King	3	January 2002	Kingsport, Tennessee	
Ray Idol	2	February 28, 2002	Kingsport, Tennessee	Awarded title via forfeit when Allen King is fired from the promotion.
Rick Karloff	1	October 25, 2002	Kingsport, Tennessee	Awarded title via forfeit when Ray Idol suffers a knee injury.
Ray Idol	3	December 28, 2002	Kingsport, Tennessee	
Beau James	1	January 24, 2003	Kingsport, Tennessee	
Bunkhouse Buck	1	July 20, 2003	Kingsport, Tennessee	Won title in "Loser Leaves Town" Bunkhouse match.
