= Fall Branch, Tennessee =

Fall Branch
- CDP
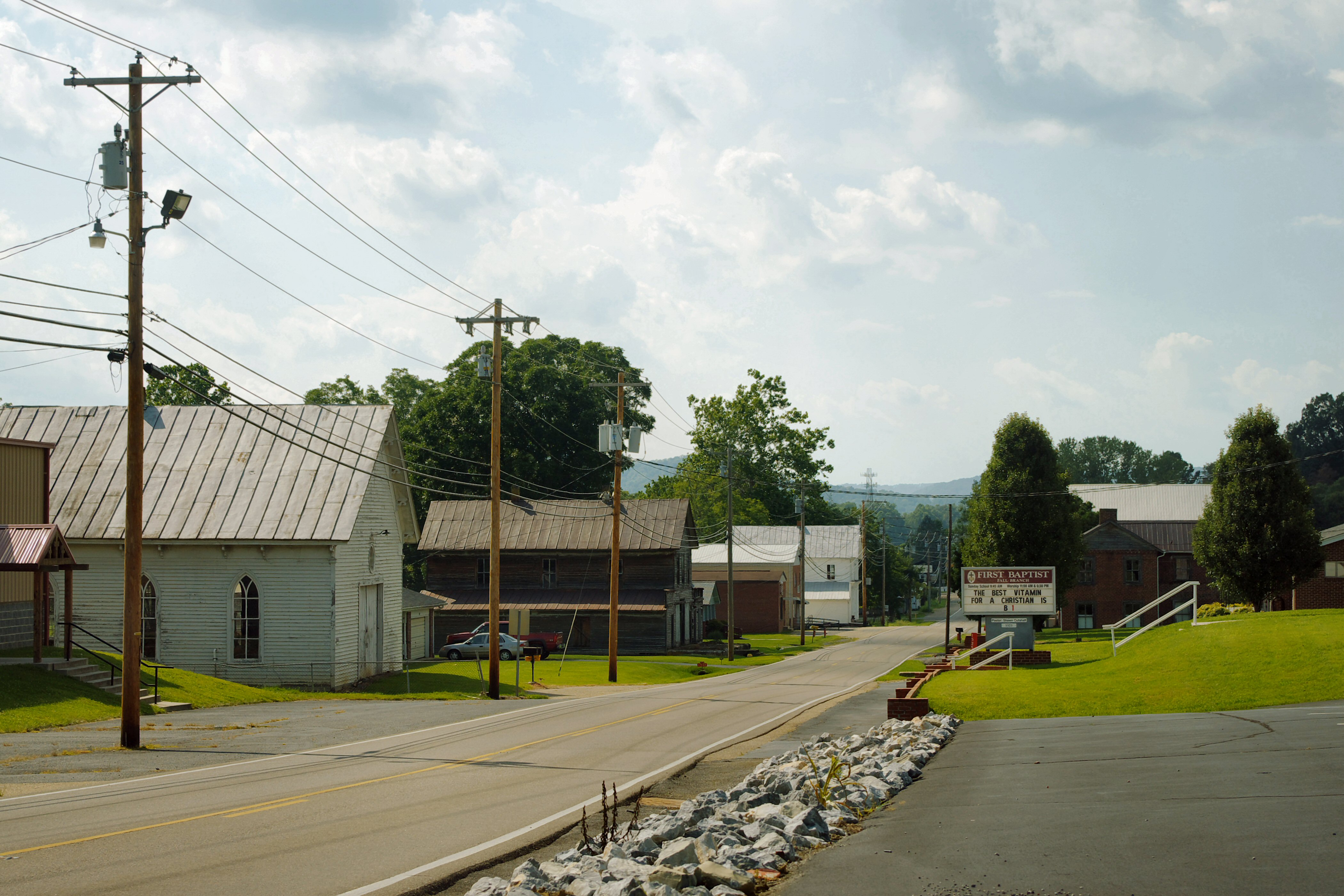
- State Route 93 in the downtown district of Fall Branch

- Location of Fall Branch, Tennessee
- Coordinates: 36°25′11″N 82°37′36″W
- Country: United States
- State: Tennessee
- Counties: Washington, Greene
- Settled: 1780s

Area
  - Total: 4.52 sq mi (11.70 km^{2})
  - Land: 4.52 sq mi (11.70 km^{2})
  - Water: 0 sq mi (0.00 km^{2})
- Elevation: 1,499 ft (457 m)

Population (2020)
  - Total: 1,248
  - Density: 276.3/sq mi (106.67/km^{2})
- Time zone: UTC-5 (Eastern (EST))
  - Summer (DST): UTC-4 (EDT)
- ZIP code: 37656
- Area code: 423
- FIPS code: 47-25540
- GNIS feature ID: 2402475

Fall Branch is a census-designated place (CDP) in Washington and Greene counties in the U.S. state of Tennessee. The population was 1,291 at the 2010 census. Some areas in Sullivan also use the Fall Branch ZIP code.

Fall Branch is part of the Johnson City Metropolitan Statistical Area, which is a component of the Johnson City–Kingsport–Bristol, TN-VA Combined Statistical Area – commonly known as the "Tri-Cities" region.

== History ==
One of the earliest settlers at Fall Branch was Isaac White, a Revolutionary War veteran who arrived in the area in 1781. He eventually established a farm at what is now the intersection of Interstate 81 and State Highway 93. Another early settler, Gabriel Morgan, built a grist mill at Fall Branch in the early 1800s. The mill stood until the 1930s, when it was torn down.

By the early 1800s, Fall Branch was known as "Crouch Town", after a family of early settlers. The name had changed to "James' Cross Roads" by 1830, when a post office was established. The name "Falls Branch" had been adopted by 1854, and the "s" was dropped from "Falls" in 1883, giving the community its current name. The name was inspired by the waterfall the community's main creek, also called Fall Branch, spills over just before it empties into Horse Creek.

In 1836, Fall Branch was designated as the county seat of the proposed "Powell County", which would have consisted of parts of Washington, Greene, Sullivan, and Hawkins counties. While voters approved of the new county, it was rejected by the Tennessee Supreme Court on the grounds that it failed to meet the minimum size required by the state constitution for new counties.

A school, Fall Branch Seminary, was established at Fall Branch in 1842. Fall Branch High School, initially a two-year school, was established before 1900. The high school was consolidated with several other smaller schools to form Daniel Boone High School in nearby Gray in 1971.

A number of buildings dating to the 19th century still stand in Fall Branch. The Masonic Lodge, home to Johnson Lodge No. 274, was completed in 1869. The Joseph Sheppard House, constructed in the late 1850s, was believed to have been used to hide Confederate soldiers during the Civil War. The Bud White Home was constructed by a local physician, Jonathan Blair White, in 1869. The Hopper House, used as a boarding home for early Fall Branch Seminary students, was constructed in the first half of the 19th century.

== Geography ==
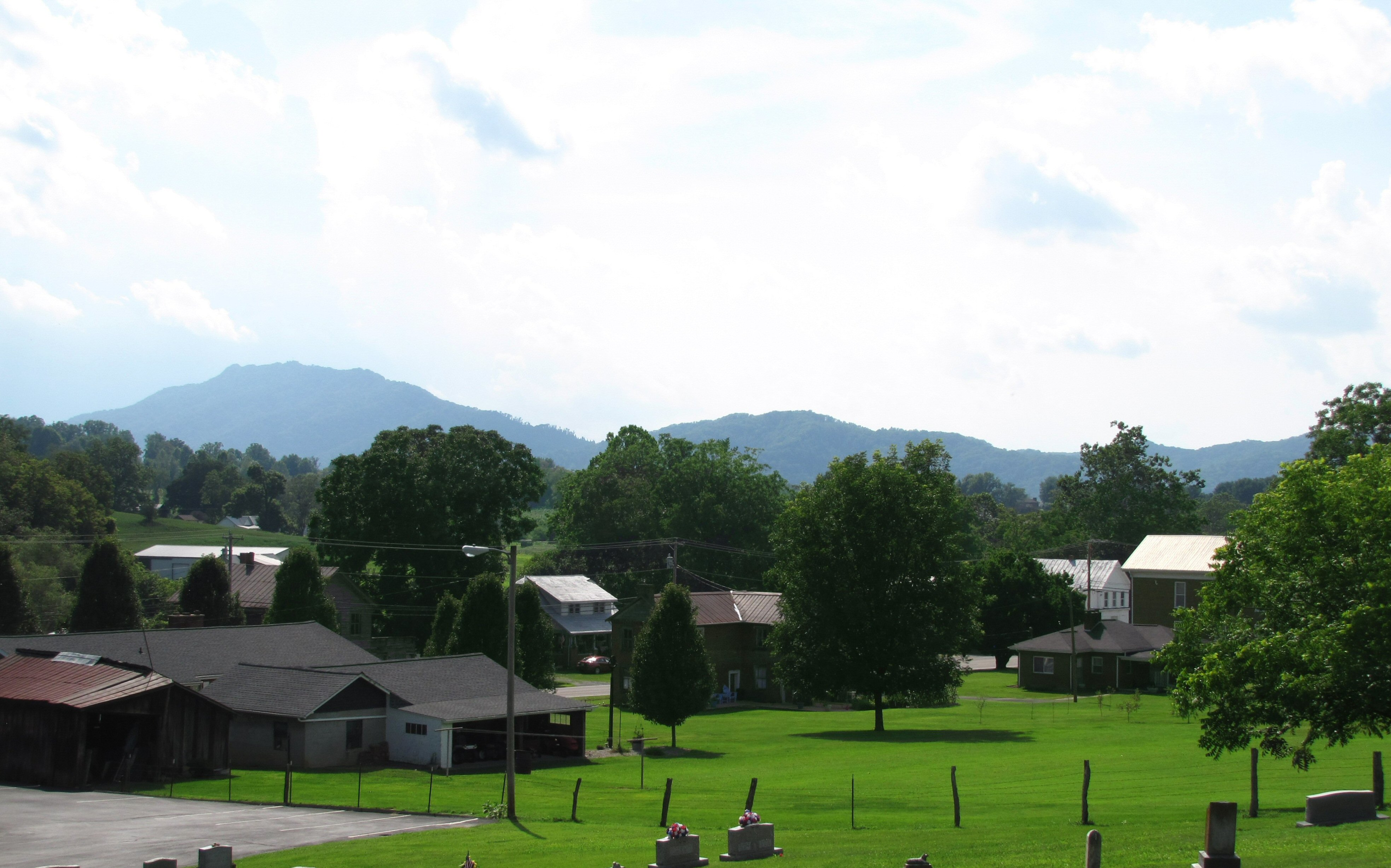
View across Fall Branch, with Chimneytop Mountain in the distance on the left

Fall Branch is located at 36°25′11″N 82°37′36″W (36.419684, -82.626760). The community is situated along a creek of the same name that flows northward for several miles before emptying into Horse Creek (Horse Creek is a tributary of the South Fork Holston River). Just before reaching Horse Creek, Fall Branch flows over the 40-foot (12 m) Fall Branch Falls. Many of Fall Branch's houses and public buildings lie along the base of the 1,962-foot (598 m) Fulwiler Hill. Chimneytop Mountain, part of the greater Ridge-and-Valley Appalachians, rises prominently several miles to the west.

According to the United States Census Bureau, the CDP has a total area of 4.5 square miles (11.7 km^{2}), all of it land.

== Demographics ==
Historical population
Census	Pop.	Note	%±
2020	1,248		—
U.S. Decennial Census

As of the census of 2000, there were 1,313 people, 547 households, and 404 families residing in the CDP. The population density was 281.3 inhabitants per square mile (108.6/km^{2}). There were 585 housing units at an average density of 125.3 per square mile (48.4/km^{2}). The racial makeup of the CDP was 99.16% White, 0.38% Native American, and 0.46% from two or more races.

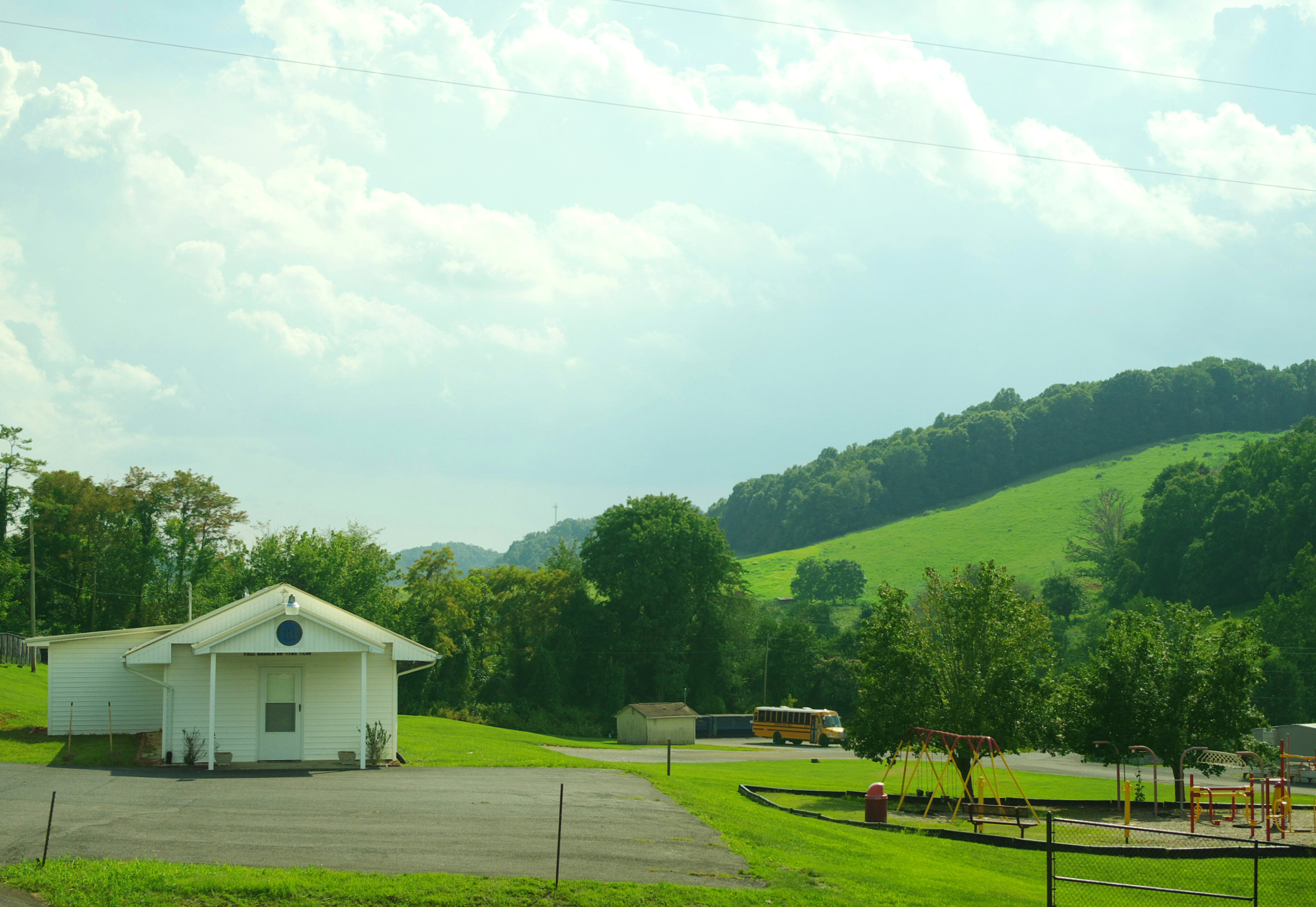
View west from the Fall Branch Post Office; the Ruritan Club is on the left

There were 547 households, out of which 27.4% had children under the age of 18 living with them, 63.1% were married couples living together, 7.3% had a female householder with no husband present, and 26.0% were non-families. 23.6% of all households were made up of individuals, and 9.0% had someone living alone who was 65 years of age or older. The average household size was 2.40 and the average family size was 2.84.

In the CDP, the population was spread out, with 21.5% under the age of 18, 5.0% from 18 to 24, 30.2% from 25 to 44, 27.3% from 45 to 64, and 16.1% who were 65 years of age or older. The median age was 41 years. For every 100 females, there were 101.1 males. For every 100 females age 18 and over, there were 95.3 males.

The median income for a household in the CDP was $37,083, and the median income for a family was $42,802. Males had a median income of $30,776 versus $20,568 for females. The per capita income for the CDP was $19,605. About 1.1% of families and 3.0% of the population were below the poverty line, including none of those under age 18 and 9.5% of those age 65 or over.

== Postal service ==
Fall Branch has a post office and a zip code (37656).

The post office is located at 134 Ruritan Road, Fall Branch, Tennessee 37656.

== Education ==
The Washington County portion of the CDP is in the Washington County School District. The Greene County portion of the CDP is in the Greene County School District.

One school is located in Fall Branch; Fall Branch School, which serves grades PreK–8 in the Washington County portion of the community. West Pines Elementary School (grades PreK–8) previously served the Greene County portion until its closure in 2019. Grades PreK-5 now attend Baileyton Elementary in Baileyton and grades 6-8 now attend North Greene Middle School in Ottway. High school students attend North Greene High School (Greene County portion) and Daniel Boone High School (Washington County portion).

== Transportation ==
Fall Branch is located off Interstate 81 exit 50, on State Route 93 near where Tennessee State Route 93 and Tennessee State Route 81 intersect South of Kingsport, north of Jonesborough and northeast of Greeneville.

== Notable people ==
- Trevor Lawrence, starting quarterback for Jacksonville Jaguars lived in Fall Branch at one point during his childhood.
- Will Little, MLB Umpire
