= Chris Hamrick =

American professional wrestler

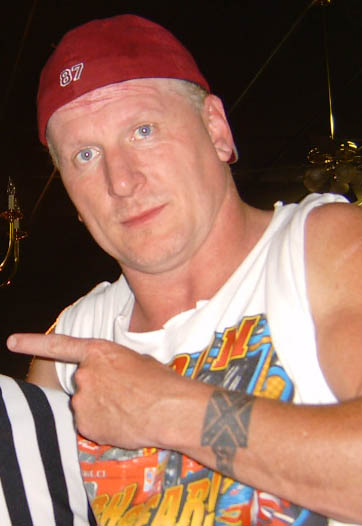

Personal information
- Born: Christopher Hamrick; October 21, 1966 (age 59) Mooresboro, North Carolina, U.S.

Professional wrestling career
- Ring name(s): Chris Hamrick; Crimson Dragon; Hamrick; Chris Landell
- Billed height: 6 ft 1 in (1.85 m)
- Billed weight: 210 lb (95 kg)
- Billed from: Raleigh, North Carolina; Cleveland County, North Carolina
- Trained by: Ricky Morton
- Debut: 1983

Christopher Hamrick (born October 21, 1966) is an American professional wrestler. He is best known for his tenure in Extreme Championship Wrestling (ECW). He is also known for his appearances in WWE, Total Nonstop Action Wrestling (TNA), and the independent circuit.

== Professional wrestling career ==
=== Early career ===
Hamrick began watching wrestling as a child. He made his professional debut at the age of sixteen in a promotion operated by his father, facing Alvin Melton in Mooresboro, North Carolina. Hamrick wrestled on the independent circuit for several years.

In 1994, Hamrick wrestled several televised matches as an enhancement talent for the World Wrestling Federation, working with the likes of Razor Ramon, the 1–2–3 Kid, Owen Hart, Billy Gunn, Jeff Jarrett and others.

Although he did not win many matches at the big time level, he did in the independent circuit. Hamrick went to the IWWA, often to team up with Tommy "Wildfire" Rich and had memorable matches against Rock Parsons and Ivan Koloff. Later he teamed up with Rock to go against Lord Zoltan and Chief Jay Eagle. Hamrick went on to wrestle for Smoky Mountain Wrestling before returning to the independent circuit.

=== Extreme Championship Wrestling (2000–2001) ===
Hamrick wrestled a tryout match with Extreme Championship Wrestling on May 25, 2000 in Columbia, South Carolina, and remained with the promotion until it declared bankruptcy in April 2001. In ECW, Hamrick was known as "Confederate Currency" Chris Hamrick and was part of the stable known as Hot Commodity with EZ Money, Elektra and Julio Dinero.

=== Back to the independent circuit (2002–present) ===
In 2002, Hamrick made several appearances with Total Nonstop Action Wrestling, wrestling under a mask as the luchadore character Crimson Dragon. In 2002 and 2003, he frequently wrestled for Xtreme Pro Wrestling, where he formed a tag team with Tracy Smothers known as Southern Comfort, also having a long-running feud for the TV title with Kaos and The Enterprise.

In 2003, Hamrick toured the UK with Frontier Wrestling Alliance. He won the All-England Championship after defeating the Zebra Kid, later on he lost the championship to Jonny Storm. In 2006 he returned to work in the UK, this time Hamrick worked full time for One Pro Wrestling.

On 28 July 2005, Hamrick returned to work for WWE in an episode of WWE SmackDown, he wrestled for the tag team championships when he teamed up with Chuck Szili in a losing effort against Heidenreich & Road Warrior Animal. In early 2006 he worked two matches on WWE Heat. On the August 20, 2007, episode of WWE Raw, Hamrick made an appearance as a fake version of Triple H, in which he placed a crown on King Booker's head during a royal ceremony, leading up to Booker's match with Triple H at SummerSlam.

Hamrick was featured on Wrestling Society X's first episode on MTV, getting into an argument with fellow ECW alumni New Jack, then getting eliminated by him in the WSX Rumble later that night. Despite both of them getting eliminated from the bout, Hamrick took an elbow drop from New Jack off the top of a truckbed through a table. At HCW: Beg 4 Mercy 2007 in April, Hamrick returned to Mooresboro, NC and defeated New Jack in an Extreme Weapons Match. Three months later, Hamrick won the HCW Triple Crown Championship after defeating Axl Knight, Wicked, and Shea Shea McGrady in a Four Way Dance at HCW's Cold Blooded and hardcore event. In March 2008, Hamrick was stripped of the title. On June 14 at Underground Revolution 2008, Hamrick defeated the current champion, Shea Shea McGrady, to reclaim the title.

One of his most recent matches took place in February 2015 in Mid Atlantic Championship Wrestling. Hamrick beat Johnny Swinger.

On December 29, 2018, Hamrick was involved in a War Games style match for the Eastern Wrestling Federation in Forest City, NC. The stipulations for the match stated that if Hamrick’s team won, Chase Lovelace (a member of the opposing team) would leave the company, but if Hamrick’s team lost, Hamrick would leave the company. Ultimately, Hamrick’s team lost and he was forced to leave the company.

On September 20, 2025, Hamrick teamed alongside Ben Wright, Tristen Williams, and Chase Lovelace to defeat Eddie Golden, Evan Golden, Colin Casanova and Conner Drake in an eight-man tag team match at Heritage Wrestling Alliance’s Summer Meltdown event in Rutherfordton, North Carolina.

== Professional wrestling style and persona ==
He used "Good Ol' Boys" by Waylon Jennings as his theme song.

== Championships and accomplishments ==
- Bloody Rage American Wrestling League
  - BRAWL Tag Team Championship (1 time) – with Tracy Smothers
- All Pro Wrestling
  - APW Heavyweight Championship (1 time)
  - APW Tag Team Championship (1 time) - with Dave Jericho
- All-Star Championship Wrestling
  - ACW Heavyweight Championship (2 times)
  - ACW Light Heavyweight Championship (1 time)
  - ACW Tag Team Championship (1 time) – with Mike Preston
- Appalachia Pro Wrestling
  - APW Tag Team Championship (1 time) - with Mike Preston
- Assault Championship Wrestling
  - ACW Heavyweight Championship (1 time)
- Big Time Wrestling
  - BTW Heavyweight Championship (1 time)
- Champions With Attitudes
  - CWA Cruiserweight Championship (1 time)
  - CWA Carolinas Championship (1 time)
- Cleveland All-Pro Wrestling
  - CAPW Unified Heavyweight Championship (2 times)
  - CAPW North American Tag Team Championship (1 time) - with Julio Dinero
- Delaware Championship Wrestling
  - DCW International Heavyweight Championship (1 time)
- Fantasy Pro-Wrestling Federation
  - FPWF United States Junior Heavyweight Championship (2 times)
  - FPWF United States Tag Team Championship (1 time) - with Jeff Hamrick
- Frontier Wrestling Alliance
  - FWA All-England Championship (1 time)
- Hardcore Championship Wrestling
  - HCW Triple Crown Championship (2 times)
- Heritage Wrestling Alliance
  - HWA Tri-States Championship (1 time)
- Independent Wrestling Association Mid-South
  - IWA Mid-South Tag Team Championship (1 time) - with Tracy Smothers
- International Wrestling Cartel
  - IWC Tag Team Championship (2 times) - with Tracy Smothers
- MainStream Wrestling Entertainment
  - MSWE Heavyweight Championship (1 time)
- NWA Mid-Atlantic Championship Wrestling
  - NWA Mid-Atlantic Hardcore Championship (1 time)
  - NWA Mid-Atlantic Junior Heavyweight Championship (2 times)
- National Wrestling Alliance
  - NWA Ohio Tag Team Championship (1 time) – with Tracy Smothers
- New Era Pro Wrestling
  - NEPW Triple Crown Championship (3 times)
- Pro Wrestling Illustrated
  - PWI ranked him #203 of the top 500 singles wrestlers in 2003
- Southern Wrestling Association
  - SWA Tag Team Championship (1 time) – with Tracer X
- Premier Wrestling Federation
  - PWF Universal Championship (1 time)
  - PWF Light Heavyweight Championship (1 time)
- Extreme Wrestling Federation
  - EWF Tag Team Championship (1 time) – with Ricky Morton
- Pro Wrestling Federation
  - PWF Eastern States Championship (1 time)
  - PWF Southeastern Championship (1 time)
  - PWF Tag Team Championship (2 times) - with Ripper
- Union of Independent Pro Wrestlers
  - UIPW Heavyweight Championship (1 time)
- United States Wrestling Federation
  - USWF Heavyweight Championship (1 time)
- Eastern Wrestling Federation
  - EWF Tag Team Championship (2 times)– with Erik Anton (1) and Timmy Anton (1)
- Carolina Championship Wrestling
  - CCW Global Openweight Championship (1 time)
- Eastern Pro Wrestling
  - EPW Heavyweight Championship (1 time)
- Rising Phoenix Wrestling
  - RPW Mid Atlantic Heavyweight Championship (1 time)
- Supreme Championship Wrestling
  - SCW United States Championship (1 time)
