= Boston crab =

Professional wrestling hold

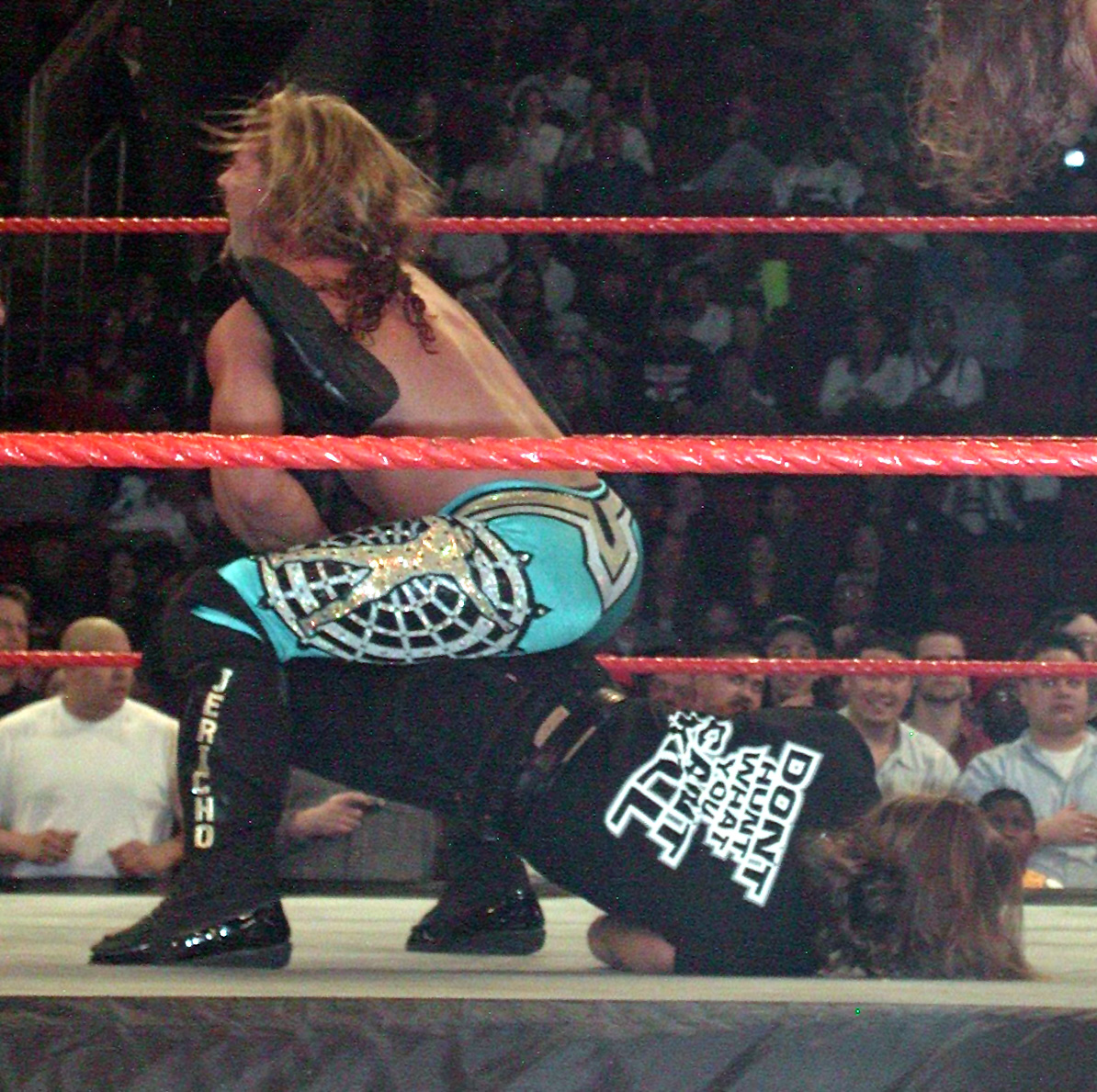
Chris Jericho with his Walls of Jericho (Elevated Boston crab) on Shawn Michaels

The Boston crab, also known as the cangrejo (Spanish for "crab") or gyaku ebi-gatame (Japanese: 逆エビ固め; English: Reverse shrimp hold), is a professional wrestling hold that typically starts with one wrestler lying in a supine position on the mat, with the other wrestler standing and facing them. It is a type of spinal lock where the wrestler hooks each of the opponent’s legs in one of their arms and then turns the opponent face-down, stepping over them in the process. The final position has the wrestler in a semi-sitting position and facing away from the opponent, with the opponent’s back and legs bent back toward their head.

The move is typically attributed to Jim Londos for either its innovation or initial popularization. The original name for the maneuver was the Backbreaker, before that term became known for its current usage. In modern wrestling, the Boston crab is not treated as a lethal submission maneuver, even though it was considered a match-ending hold in the past.

In submission grappling, the Boston crab (generally the half Boston crab) can be used to set up a straight ankle lock. On September 30, 2017, Jonno Mears became the first fighter in mixed martial arts history to win a fight with the Boston crab.

== Variations ==
=== Boston crab with knee ===
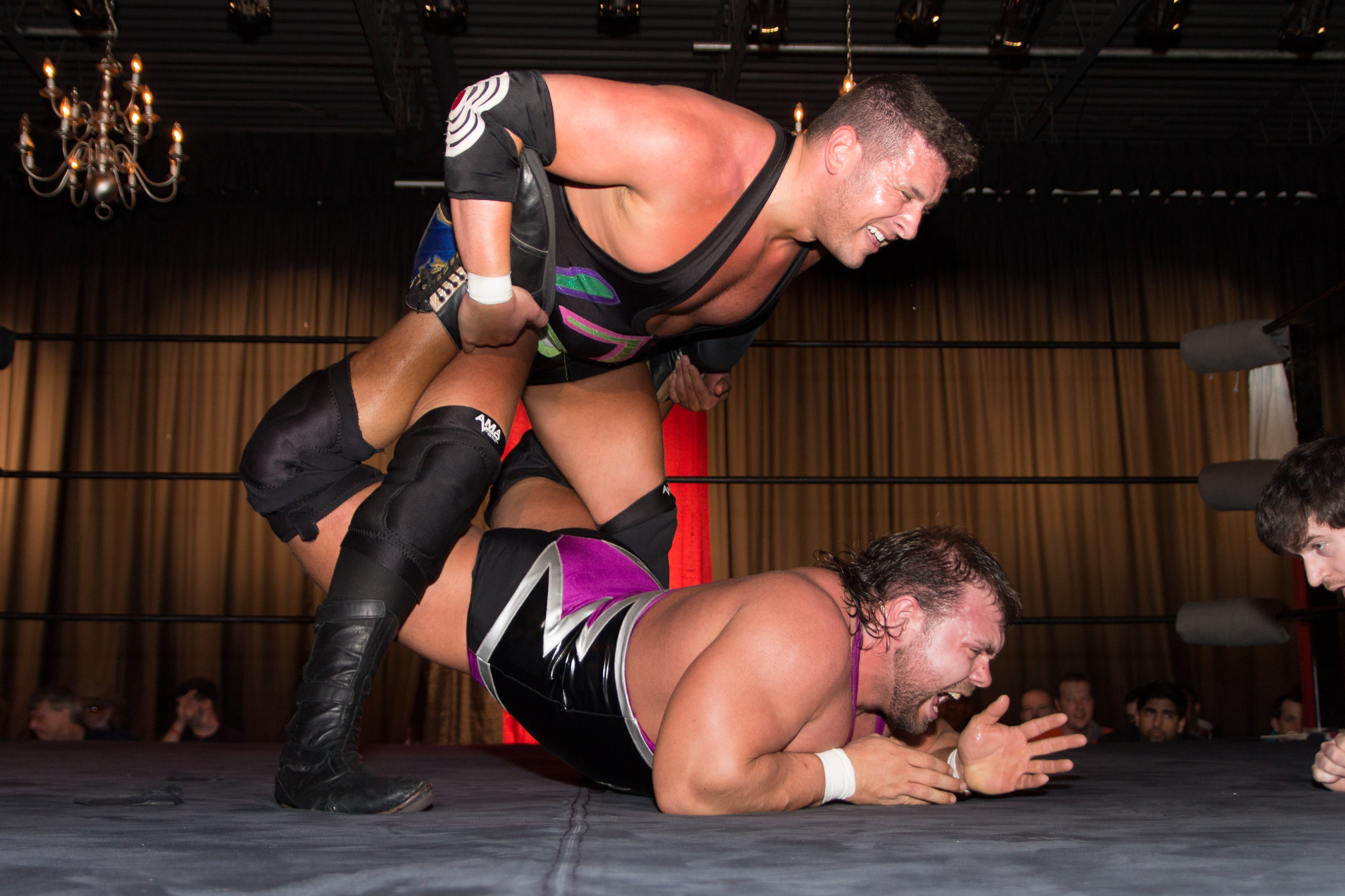
Colt Cabana performing an inverted Boston crab on Michael Elgin (dubbed the Billy Goat's Curse)

Similar to a normal Boston crab, this move sees the attacking wrestler use a single knee to add additional pressure by pressing it into the opponent's back. An elevated variation, best known as Chris Jericho's Walls of Jericho (formerly known as the Liontamer), also exists.

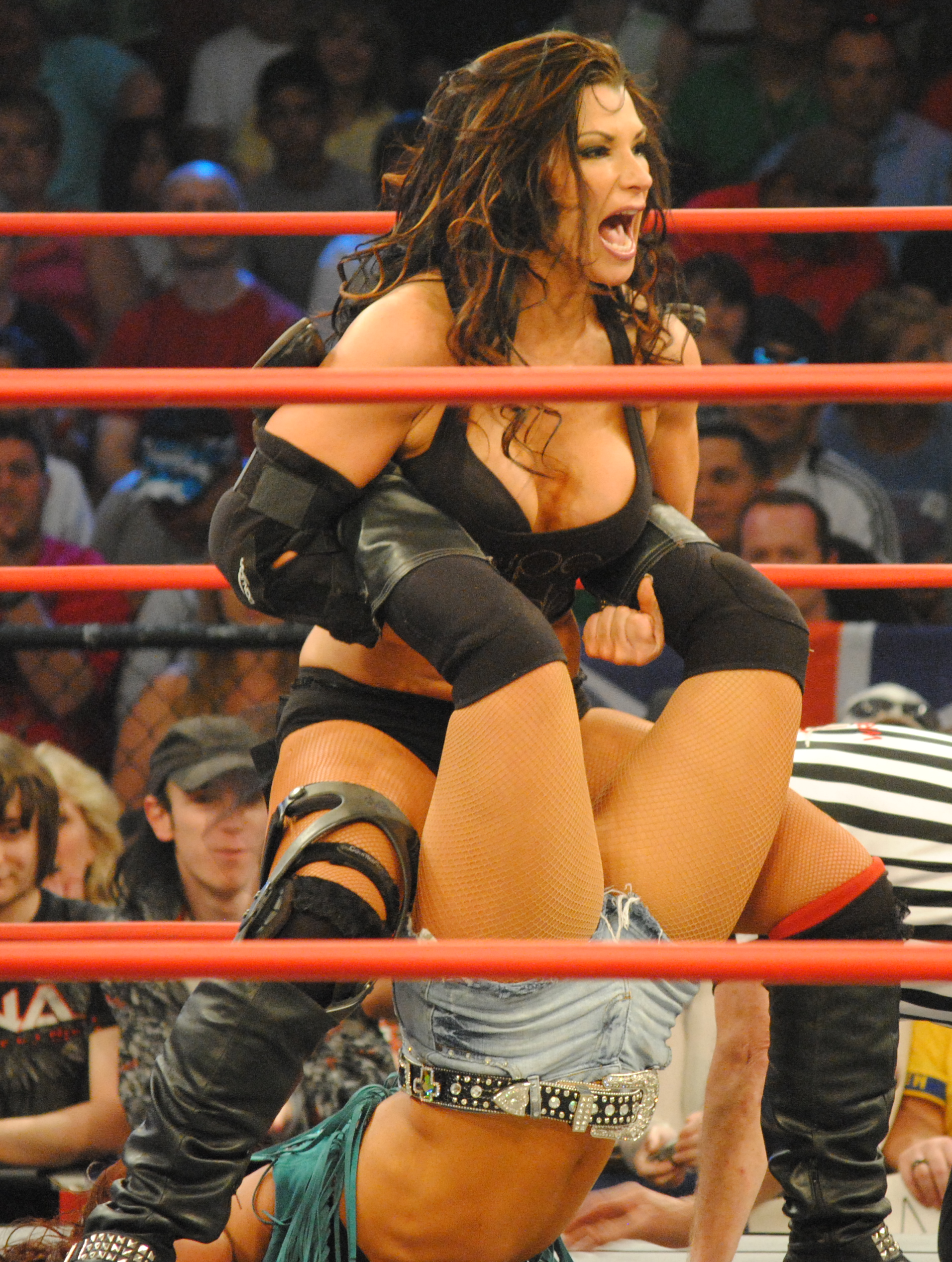
Tara placing Mickie James in an elevated Boston Crab.

=== Elevated Boston crab ===
Similar to a normal Boston crab, this move sees the attacking wrestler stand farther back. The step-back allows additional pressure to be placed on the opponent's back from the higher angle, hence the name. This move is best known as Chris Jericho's Walls of Jericho.

=== Inverted Boston crab ===
Also known as the Cangrejo Invertido (Spanish for "inverted crab"), the wrestler grabs the legs of an opponent lying supine while standing over the opponent, steps in front of the opponent's arms, and either remains standing or falls forwards, stretching the legs back. A single leg variation, also known as a Stump Puller, involves only one of the opponent's legs being stretched. A figure-four leglock variation exists as well. This move can be used as a pin as well as a submission maneuver.

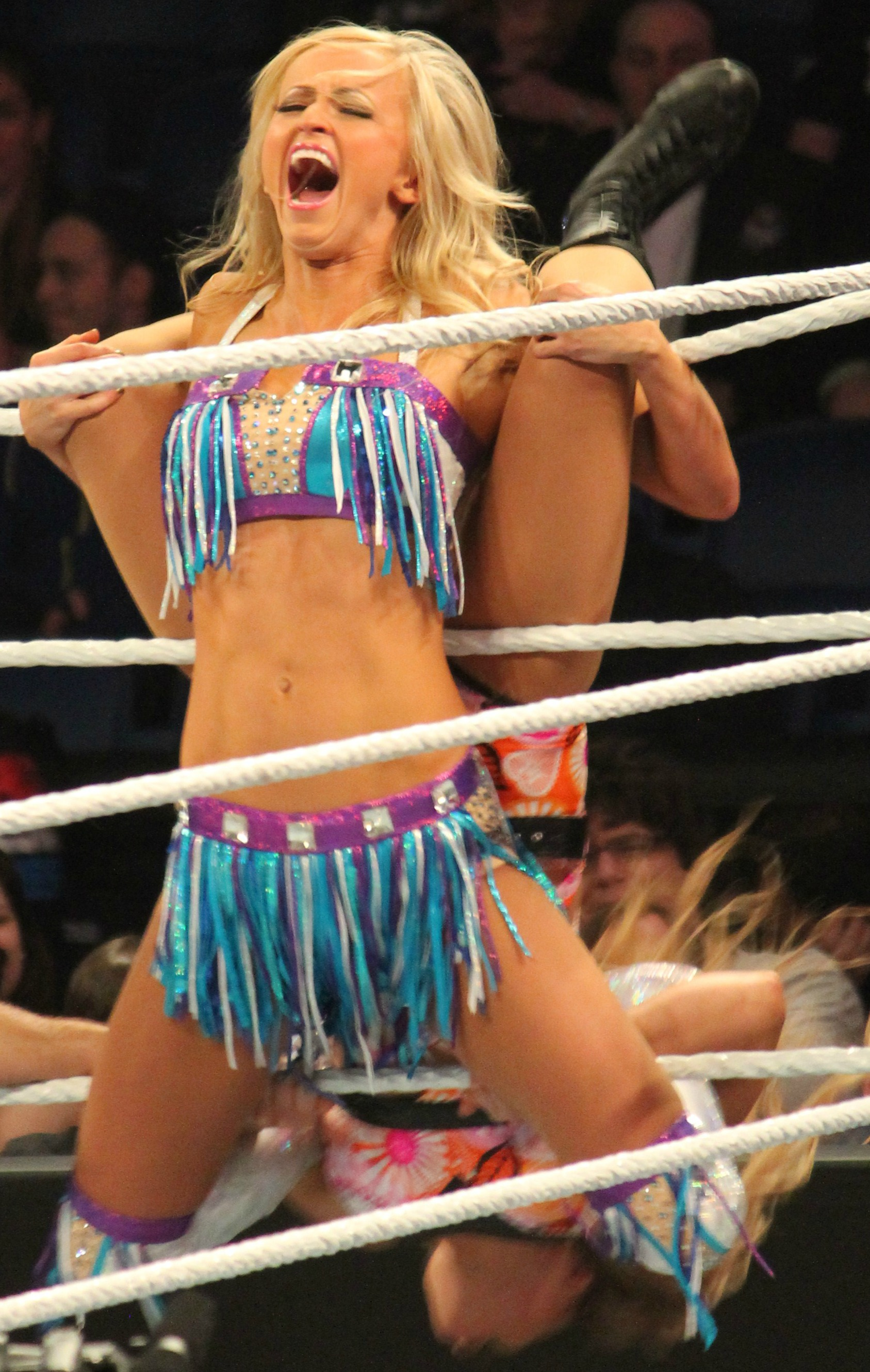
Emma applying the Dil-Emma (rope-hung Boston crab) on Summer Rae

==== Rocking horse ====
Known commonly as the Campana (Spanish for "bell"). This Boston crab variation sees the wrestler lock the opponent in the inverted version of the hold before lifting them off the ground by their arms (while still in the hold), and rocking them back and forth, putting additional pressure on their back. E.Z. Money and Evan Golden employ this move, both calling it the Pendulum of Pain. It is also the signature maneuver of luchadors La Máscara and Ángel de Oro.

The inverted version of the hold, known as the Campana Invertida, is used via the standard version of the Boston crab before the lift and wrist-clutch.

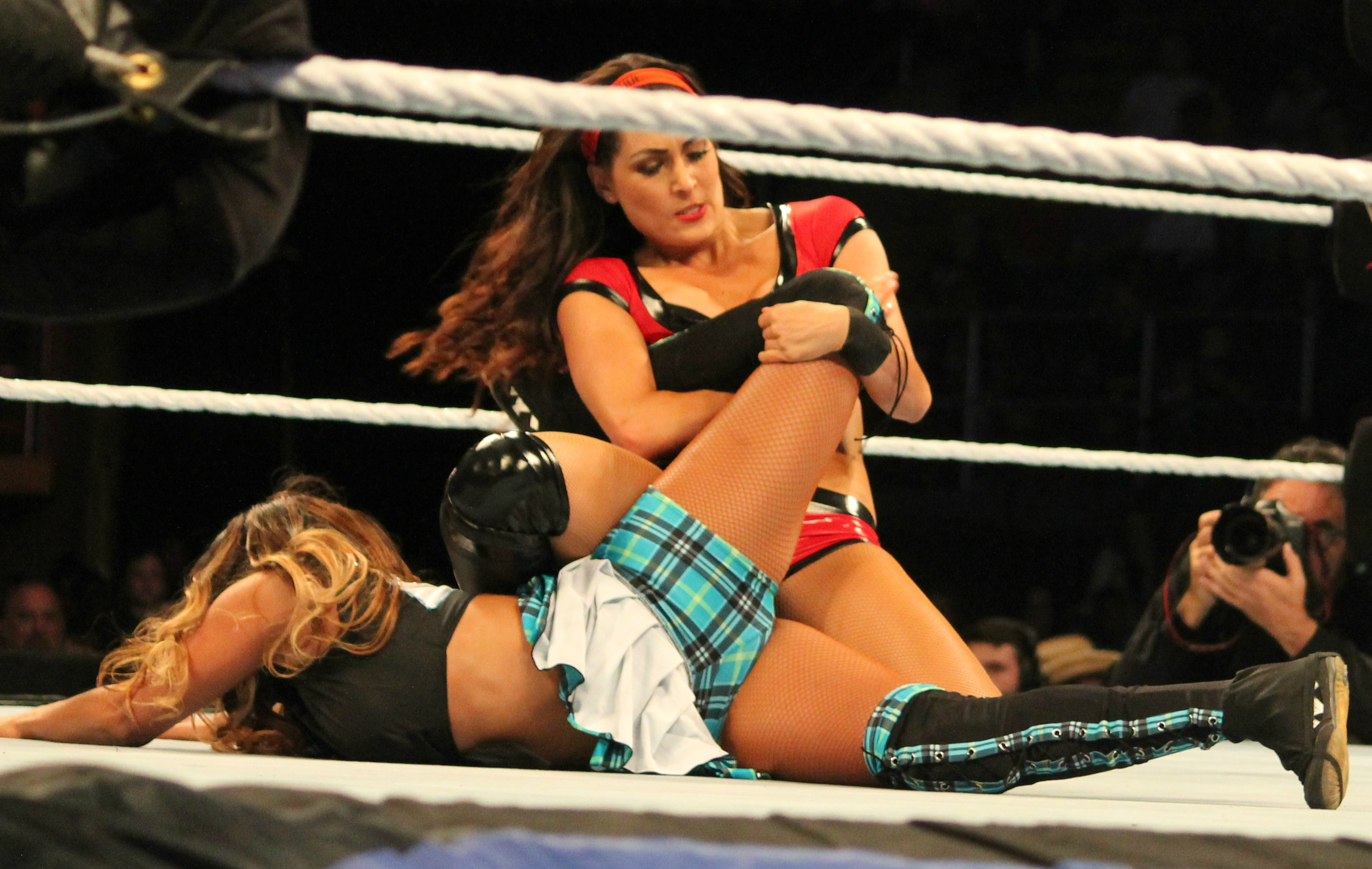
Brie Bella performing a single leg Boston crab on Cameron

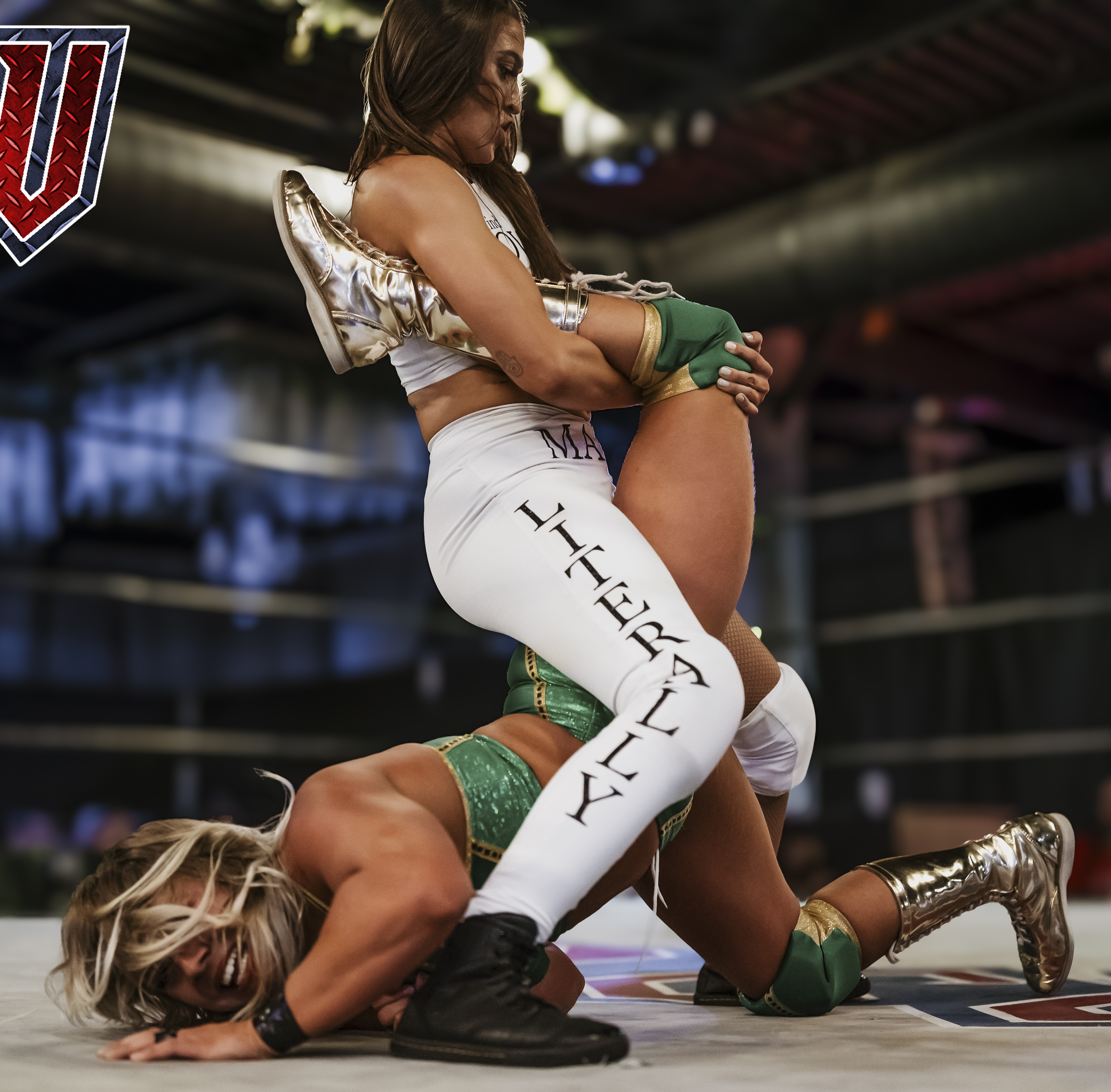
Madi Wrenkowski places Miranda Gordy in an elevated version of the single leg Boston crab

=== Rope-hung Boston crab ===
This move, also known as the Tarantula in reference to Yoshihiro Tajiri's naming of the move, involves a wrestler hooking each of an opponent's legs in one of their arms and draping the opponent over the top rope. At this point the wrestler hooks the arms of the opponent with their legs, securing the hold. As this move involves the use of the ropes, and allows the opponent to touch the ropes (which forces a wrestler to break a submission hold), this hold must usually be broken before the referee completes a five-count. Otherwise, the wrestler will be disqualified. This is the reason why it is best used during no disqualification matches or "I Quit" matches.

=== Single leg Boston crab ===
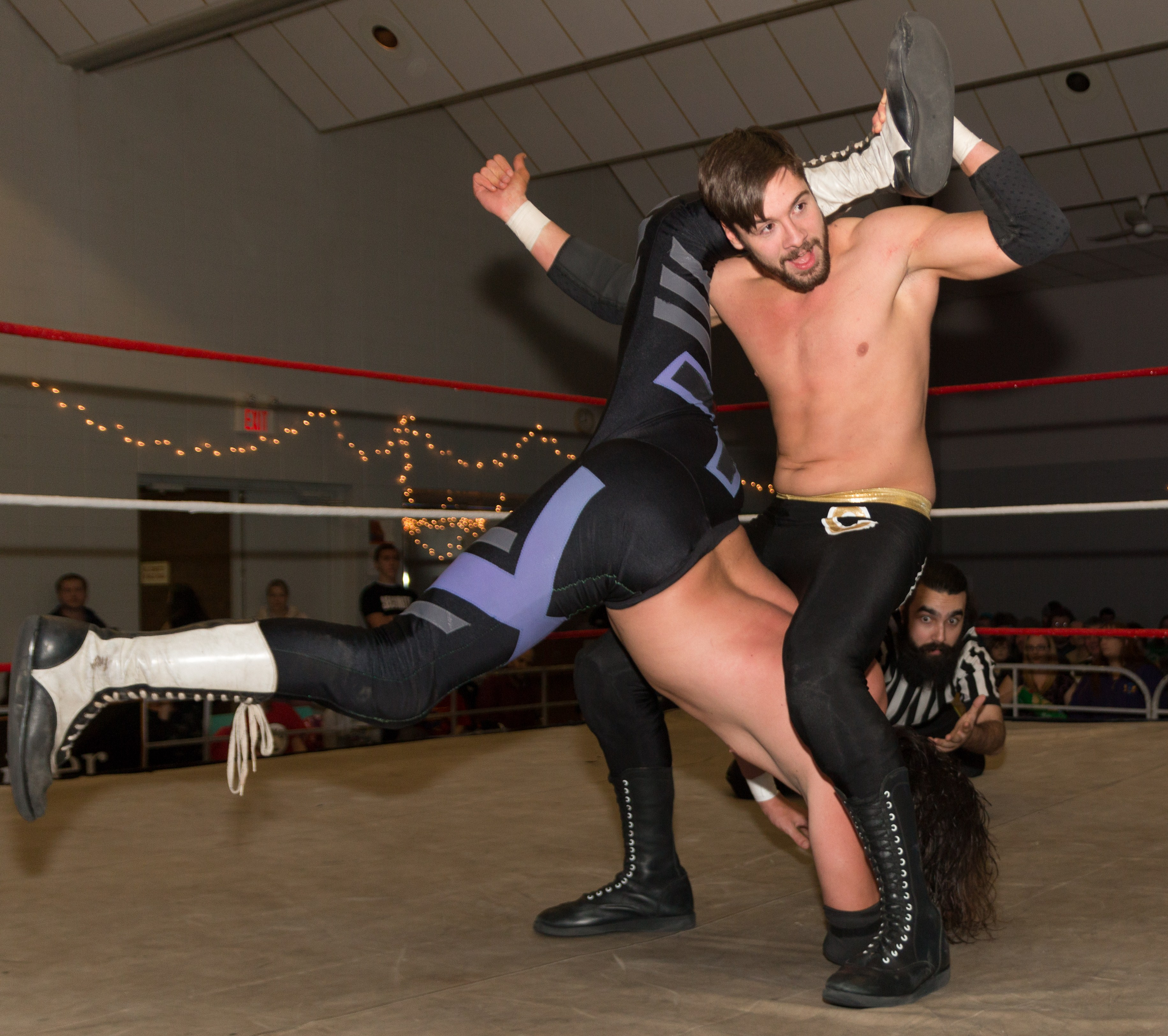
A Stretch Muffler being applied.

Also known as a half Boston crab, half crab, or Medio Cangrejo (Spanish for "half crab"), a move that typically starts with the opponent on their back, and the attacking wrestler standing and facing them. The attacking wrestler hooks one of the opponent's legs under one of their arms, and then turns the opponent face-down, stepping over them in the process. The final position has the dominant wrestler in a semi-sitting position and facing away from the opponent who is lying face-down and their own leg bent backwards toward their head. A variation with the attacking wrestler kneeling side-ways while having the leg hooked can be performed. Lance Storm used this maneuver as a counter to an oncoming opponent by grabbing one of the opponent's legs in a single leg takedown and using the momentum to roll backwards into the hold.

==== Over-the-shoulder single-leg Boston crab ====
Also known as the Stretch Muffler or Argentine leg-lock, it is performed via a wrestler placing their opponent's leg over their neck and beginning to crank down. This variant of the move is considered to apply pressure primarily to the knee of the opponent rather than the other versions of the Boston crab which focus on the lower spine. The move is also known as the "Brock Lock", as it was briefly used by Brock Lesnar in the early 2000s under that name.

== See also ==
- Professional wrestling holds
