= Rocky Anderson (wrestler) =

American professional wrestler

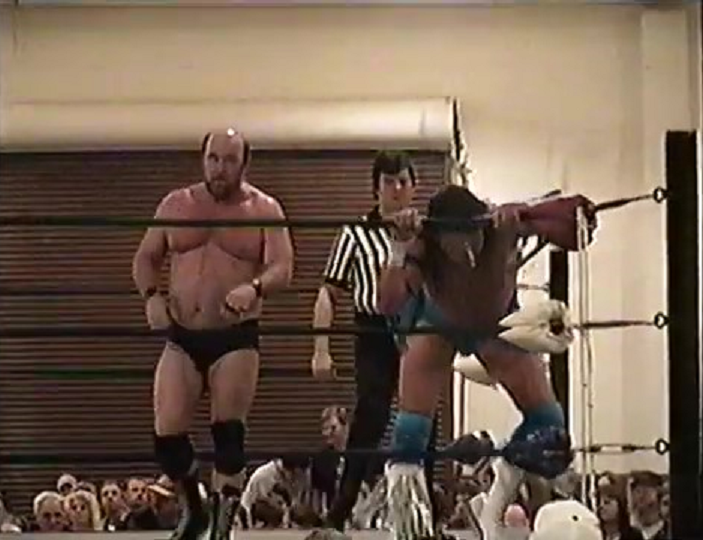
- Rocky Anderson (left) in 1997

Personal information
- Born: Rocky Mills
- Family: Anderson

Professional wrestling career
- Ring name: Rocky Anderson

Rocky Mills, better known by the ring name Rocky Anderson, is an American professional wrestler and trainer. Mills is not a member of the Anderson family.

== Professional wrestling career ==
=== Becoming an Anderson ===
Mills was the head trainer for NWA Hall of Famer Gene Anderson's gym. Mills wrestled as Rocky Anderson, a member of the Anderson family.

=== Creating new Andersons ===
Pat Connors, who had been training with Ivan Koloff, wanted to start his professional wrestling career and perform as a member of the Anderson wrestling family. Connors told Koloff of this request and Koloff agreed and spent extra time training Connors so he understood what it meant to be an Anderson. Koloff then reached out to Mills and told him he had a guy who looked and wrestled like an Anderson. Mills went to a show in Monroe, North Carolina to see Connors perform and was impressed by what he had seen in the match. Rocky, with the blessings of Gene Anderson, gave Connors permission to use the Anderson gimmick. Connors started wrestling as Pat Anderson. Afterwards, Mills and Connors worked together as a tag team for a brief time.

Not long after Connors became an Anderson he met C. W. Anderson. Connors was impressed with Wright's skills and appearance and the two started working together as a tag team. Gene Anderson had died by this time so Connors contacted Mills for permission to make Wright an Anderson. Mills told Connors to use his judgement and Wright started wrestling as C. W. Anderson.

=== American Pro Wrestling (1997) ===
Mills performed for American Pro Wrestling (APW) in 1997.

In 1997; Mills was defeated by Chief Jay Eagle in Mocksville, North Carolina on November 7, Mills is again defeated by Chief Jay Eagle in Clover, South Carolina on November 8 and Chief Jay Eagle and Banjo Bucky win against Mills and Manny Fernandez by disqualification at the National Guard's Armory in King's Mountain, North Carolina on November 22.

== Personal life ==
Although he was billed as such at various times, Mills is not actually related to Gene Anderson, Ole Anderson, Bryant Anderson, Pat Anderson, C. W. Anderson or any other members of the Anderson family.
