= Eddie Golden =

American professional wrestler (born 1973)

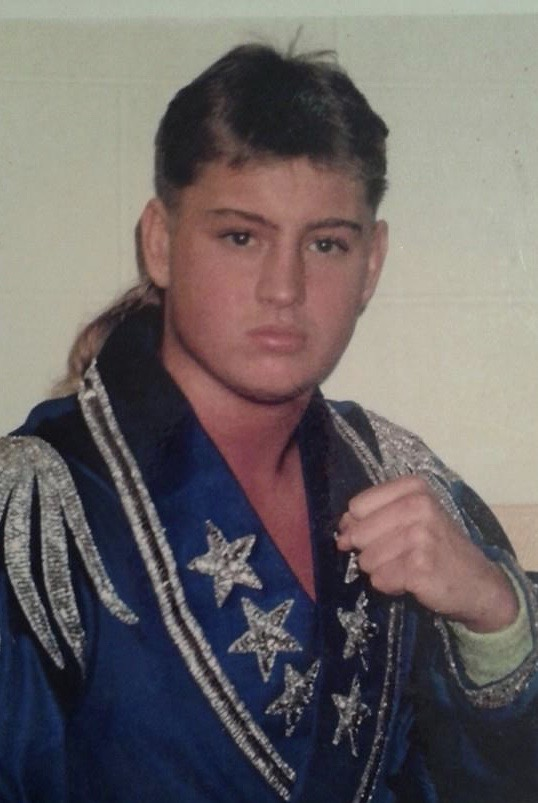

Personal information
- Born: Harold Edward Cox; November 4, 1973 (age 53) Johnson City, Tennessee, U.S.
- Spouse: Natalie Cox (m. 1995)
- Children: Evan Golden
- Relative: Bunkhouse Buck (uncle)

Professional wrestling career
- Ring name(s): Eddie Golden; Buck Golden
- Billed height: 6 ft 1 in (1.85 m)
- Billed weight: 205 lb (93 kg)
- Billed from: Knoxville, Tennessee
- Debut: 1990

Harold Edward Cox (born November 4, 1973), better known by the ring name Eddie Golden, is an American professional wrestler. A member of the Golden wrestling family, he is the father of Evan Golden and the nephew of Bunkhouse Buck.

Golden was one of the top junior heavyweights in the Southeastern territories during the 1990s and won numerous championship titles in the Carolinas, Florida, Georgia, and Tennessee. He was known for his work in tag teams, specifically as part of The Beautiful Blondes with Stan Lee and the fourth incarnation of The Heavenly Bodies with K. C. Thunder.

A major star in Southern States Wrestling during the 1990s, Golden won the SSW Junior Heavyweight Championship three times and the SSW Tag Team Championship twice with Alex Shane and Stan Lee. In 2000, Golden joined NWA Wildside where he was part of Jeff G. Bailey's NWA Elite stable with Ruckus, Onyx, and Terry Knight. He was considered by Pro Wrestling Illustrated as one of the promotion's "best young veterans", winning the NWA Wildside Television Championship three times and having impressive matches against AJ Styles, E. Z. Money, and Kid Kash.

== Early life ==
Harold Edward Cox was born on November 4, 1973, in Johnson City, Tennessee. A member of the Golden-branch of the famed Welch-Fuller wrestling family, he is the grandson of Montgomery, Alabama, wrestling promoter Billy Golden and nephew of Jimmy Golden. He briefly attended East Tennessee State University during his beginning tenures of professional wrestling.

== Professional wrestling career ==
=== Early career (1990–1991) ===
Golden made his professional wrestling debut in 1990. He spent the first few years of his career wrestling on the local Tennessee independent circuit. By October 1991, Golden was in Tennessee Championship Wrestling working with the likes of Stan Lee, E. Z. Money, J. C. Black, Wayne Rogers, Jeff Tankersley, The Christian Brothers (Bam Bam and Danny Christian), and a teenaged Beau James refereeing matches. Golden also teamed with Big Ox as The Texas Outlaws in Bruce Wren's Southeastern Championship Wrestling. The Texas Outlaws won the SECW Tag Team Championship three times between 1992 and 1999.

=== Southern States Wrestling (1992–1996) ===
Golden was among several wrestlers who followed Beau James when he founded Southern States Wrestling. On March 20, 1992, Golden defeated Jamie Gibson in Banner Elk, North Carolina, to become the first-ever SSW Junior Heavyweight Champion. He held onto the title for over a year before losing to Alex Shane in Fall Branch, Tennessee, on April 30, 1993. Golden regained the title in Sullivan Gardens, Tennessee, on May 28 but dropped it back to Shane in Fall Branch a month later. He and his uncle, managed by The Godfather, feuded with The Fantastics (Bobby Fulton and Tommy Rogers) that same year. An encounter between the two teams occurred at WrestleFest 93, during a "Southern Hospitality" interview segment with "Big" Al Bass, and turned into a four-way brawl.

In the summer of 1994, Golden began teaming with former rival Alex Shane. The two captured the SSW Tag Team Championship from The Death Riders (Chic White and The Tennessee Equalizer) in Fall Branch on July 15, 1994. A week later in Johnson City, Tennessee, Golden defeated Keith Hart at a show for Tim Horner's National Championship Wrestling promotion. Golen and Shane eventually lost the tag team title to Mike Powers and The Alabama Heartthrob in Kingsport, Tennessee, on August 6, 1994.

At the end of the year, Golden began teaming with Stan Lee as The Beautiful Blondes. The team would win a number of tag team championships throughout the Southeastern United States during the next few years. On December 17, 1994, Golden and Lane defeated The Rock 'n' Roll Express (Ricky Morton and Robert Gibson) at an All-Star Wrestling show in Elizabethton, Tennessee. That summer on the independent circuit, The Beautiful Blondes defeated The Young Guns (Scott Sterling and Jeff Lovin) in Elizabethton for Tennessee Championship Wrestling. On September 9, Golden and Lane lost to Ricky Morton and The Crow in Rural Retreat, Virginia. On October 1, 1995, they faced David Jericho and Chris Hamrick at a Great American Wrestling Federation show in Asheville, North Carolina. Back in SSW, the team also defeated David Jericho and Danny Cooley in Ledgar, North Carolina on December 9, 1995. Golden also defeated The Alabama Heartthrob for the SSW Junior Heavyweight Championship in Fall Branch that same week.

The Beautiful Blondes claimed their first tag title when they defeated Beau James and Ricky Morton for the SSW Tag Team Championship in Fall Branch on January 5, 1996. A few weeks later, the team faced then WWF World Tag Team Champions The Headbangers (Mosh and Thrasher) at an International Pro Wrestling in Asheville. On February 10, they wrestled The Olympian and Tony Prichard to a double-disqualification in Morristown, Tennessee. On February 26, at SSW's 5th Anniversary Show, The Beautiful Blondes lost the tag belts to Death & Destruction (Frank "The Tank" Parker and "Ruthless" Roger Anderson).

On March 1, Golden successfully defended the junior heavyweight title against Scott Sterling. The Beautiful Blondes had less luck that month losing matches to Sterling with partners Steve Flynn and Danny Christian respectively. On May 3, 1996, The Beautiful Blondes wrestled Battering Ram and Ironman at a United Wrestling Alliance show in Hansonville, Virginia; the following night in Nora, Virginia, the two wrestled their opponents in singles matches with Golden losing to Battering Ram. On May 11, The Beautiful Blondes wrestled Medic Madness (Dr. Dan and The Orderly) to a double-disqualification at a Great American Wrestling Federation show in Asheville, North Carolina. The following year, Golden lost to Ricky Morton at the Sampson Center in Fall Branch, Tennessee. The bout was promoted as a "clean scientific match", however, Morton became frustrated when the younger wrestler kept successfully countering his moves. He then uncharacteristically used "heel" tactics against Golden and scored the winning pinfall only after using the ring ropes for leverage and pulling Golden's tights. He also unsuccessfully challenged Beau James for the SSW Appalachian Heavyweight Championship.

=== Tennessee Mountain Wrestling (1996–1997) ===
At the end of 1996, Golden began competing in Tennessee Mountain Wrestling where he quickly won the promotion's light heavyweight championship. On November 30, Golden defeated Chris Steelheart in Morristown, Tennessee. On December 7, 1996, he lost to Steelheart in a non-title match at Holston High School in Knoxville. He and Ricky Rockett wrestled to a double-countout at a TMW show in Johnson City the same month. On January 5, 1997, Golden suffered his first defeat in the promotion at the hands of Chris Powers in Knoxville, Tennessee. Golden formed a short-lived alliance with Chris Steelheart when he began feuding with Ricky Rockett. The two defeated Rocket and David Jericho in a tag team match on February 14, however, Golden was unable to win the TMW Light Heavyweight Championship from Rocket in their title bout at Holsten Elementary School. Two months later, Golden and Rusty Riddle were defeated by Ricky Rocker and David Jericho at the Johnson City Parks & Recreation Center.

=== Independent circuit (1997–2000) ===
Golden continued teaming with Stan Lee during this time. In February 1997, The Beautiful Blondes wrestled Surge and Venom at a National Championship Wrestling television taping in Asheville, North Carolina. On April 4, The Beautiful Blondes and Allen King wrestled a 6-man tag match against Scott Sterling, Ricky Harrison, and Donnie Dallas for Southern Championship Wrestling in Elizabethton, Tennessee. Golden traveled to Georgia's National Championship Wrestling for the summer where he faced David Jericho and Ricky Rocket. On July 10 in Sylva, North Carolina, Golden lost to Rocket in a match for the then vacant NCW Television Championship. He again lost to Rocket in Sylva on October 2, 1997. On February 21, 1998, The Beautiful Blondes wrestled GAWF Tag Team Champions Kane and Abel Adams at a Great American Wrestling Federation event in Red Oak, North Carolina.

By the late-1990s, Golden has established himself as a formidable competitor in the Southern United States with victories over veteran wrestlers such as Bobby and Jackie Fulton, Tony Anthony, Tracey Smothers, and Jimmy Valiant. Though considered a "heel" wrestler by Southern wrestling fans, he was very popular with crowds in his native Tennessee. Golden briefly feuded with Stan Lee but would eventually reform The Beautiful Blondes with him.

Golden spent much of 1998 in Appalachian Mountain Wrestling where he had standout matches with AMW Heavyweight Champion "Playboy" Bryan Wayne. On August 1, 1998, Golden and Ricky Harrison defeated The Artists Formerly Known as The Young Guns (Scott Sterling and Jeff Lovin) for the AMW Tag Team Championship. Their three-month championship reign was ended by Bryan Wayne and his former partner Stan Lee at "Tag Wars '98" on November 14; their opponents had won an eight-team tournament earlier that night to earn a title shot. Golden subsequently won the vacant AMW Junior Heavyweight Championship from Eight-Ball Jones on December 12, 1998. Several days later in Cornelia, Georgia, Golden defeated Shane Austin for the NCW United States Heavyweight Championship in a three-way match also involving David Jericho. He lost the belt to Jesse Taylor three months later. Golden also teamed up with his uncle Jimmy Golden for occasional tag team matches in Kingsport. A July 21 bout against David Jericho and Rusty Riddle ended in a no-contest, however, they beat Pretty Handsome (Chris Steelheart and Mike Hanson) in August 1998 and "Dirty White Boy" Tony Anthony & Dr. Dan in July 1999. On March 25, 2000, Golden wrestled Big Ox for a Southeastern Championship Wrestling television taping at Bishop Moore High School in Orlando, Florida.

=== NWA Wildside (2000–2001) ===
That spring, Golden made his debut in NWA Wildside. With over a decade of experience, the 27-year-old wrestler quickly established himself as one of the "best young veterans" in the promotion. On April 1 at "Hardcore Hell 2000", he defeated A.J. Styles in a Ladder match for the NWA Wildside Television Championship in Cornelia, Georgia. He lost the belt that same night to Jesse Taylor, however, with whom he would feud with over the title throughout the year.

Golden would eventually be recruited by Jeff G. Bailey as part of NWA Elite with Ruckus, Onyx, and Terry Knight. A rematch between Golden and A.J. Styles on the May 14th edition of NWA Wildside TV saw Styles "turn heel" by attacking his tag team partner Jorge Estrada after the bout and aligning himself with Golden and NWA Elite. He and Styles faced Estrada and J.C. Dazz in a tag team match the following week. The stable would feud with former National Championship Wrestling stars, the promotion having recently merged with NWA Georgia, with Golden, Onyx, A.J. Styles, and NWA Wildside owner Bill Behrens wrestling Team NCW's Stone Mountain, J.C. Dazz, Rick Michaels, and David Young on June 18.

Golden enlisted stablemate Terry Knight in his year-long feud against Jesse Taylor. He had managed to regain the NWA Wildside Television Championship, but dropped the belt back to Taylor in Knoxville, Tennessee on July 7. Golden won it back from Taylor a day later in Sylva, North Carolina. On the August 20th edition of NWA Wildside TV, Golden and Knight wrestled Taylor and Romeo Bliss in a tag team match. They also wrestled Bad Attitude (Rick Michaels and David Young) at various times during the year. He and Taylor faced each other again on the November 6th episode of NWA Wildside TV. Holden eventually lost the television title to Air Paris at the NWA Wildside Arena on January 1, 2001. On January 20, Golden defeated E. Z. Money via countout in his NWA Wildside debut. On February 3, Golden and Terry Knight lost to David Flair and Romeo Bliss at the NWA Wildside Arena. On April 21, 2001, Golden teamed with Adam Jacobs and John Phoenix in a losing effort against A.J. Styles, Air Paris, and Onyx.

=== Independent circuit (2002–2006) ===
Golden briefly feuded with Brad Hunter in North American Championship Wrestling in early 2002. On February 8, 2002, Golden lost Hunter in Newton, North Carolina. He also took part in a 6-man tag team match with Big Daddy and Big Wood against Hunter, Black Angel, and Reverend Slim in Shelby, North Carolina, the following night. On March 5, Golden wrestled Mike Hanson on New South Wrestling's first television taping on WCYB in Johnson City, Tennessee. On November 28, 2002, Golden lost to Allen King in a three-way match with E. Z. Money for New South Wrestling.

On January 11, 2003, Golden wrestled DG 2000 for Ron’s Championship Wrestling in Knoxville. On March 22, Eddie and Jimmy Golden lost to Beau James and Gator McAllistor by countout in Kingsport. Golden lost to Jesse Taylor at NWA Wildside's "Hardcore Hell" in Cornelia, Georgia, a week later.

That summer, Golden began feuding with Jeff Tankersfly in Southern States Wrestling and on the independent circuit. On July 20, 2003, Golden was defeated by Tankersfly at an SSW show in Kingsport. On January 24, 2004, Golden defeated Tankersly (with Sherri Martel) by disqualification in Iron Ring Wrestling. On March 6, Golden and Robbie Cassidy lost to LCW Tag Team Champions Allen King and Shane Matthews in Liberty Championship Wrestling. Four months later, Golden faced Jeff Tankersly and Sherri Martel once again at Iron Ring Wrestling's show for Kingsport's annual Funfest event on July 17, 2004. The two men wrestled in a bloody Steel Cage match for the IRW Heavyweight Championship. Golden ended up winning the match after Martel turned on Tankersly in effect turning Golden into a "heel" and Tankersly a "babyface".

On February 12, 2005, Eddie Golden defeated Gluteus Maximus and Nick Diamond three-way match for Palmetto Pride Championship Wrestling in Columbia, South Carolina. On May 7, at the Mark Curtis Memorial Wrestling Reunion, Golden defeated K. C. Thunder (with The Duke of New York) via disqualification. Golden nearly pinned Thunder with a big splash at the end of the match but was pulled off of his opponent by The Duke of New York when he made the cover. While Golden argued with the referee, Thunder then hit him with brass knuckles and pinned him for the win. Thunder seemingly had the match won but the referee found the foreign object after the match and reversed the decision. On July 17, 2005, Eddie and Jimmy Golden defeated The Midnight Express (Dennis Condrey and Bobby Eaton) at an Iron Ring Wrestling show by disqualification. A week later at NWA Rocky Top's "Night of Champions" in Knoxville, Eddie teamed with cousin Bobbie Golden to beat The Turbanators (Jahid and Jaheed) by disqualification. Golden returned to Knoxville for NWA Rocky Top's "Retribution" on August 19 where he and Tim Horner, accompanied by Bobbie Golden, were defeated by The Turbanators in a rematch. Golden defeated K. C. Thunder at a Carolina Championship Wrestling show in Clyde, North Carolina, on October 8. On November 6, 2005, Golden wrestled E. Z. Money at Iron Ring Wrestling's "Afternoon Chaos" in Kingsport, Tennessee. On March 11, 2006, Golden and K. C. Thunder wrestled Iron Cross and Rich Mansfield in USA Main Event.

=== Championship Wrestling (2006–2007) ===
Golden started working for Championship Wrestling in early 2006. On April 22, 2006, Golden beat Allen King in Elizabethton, Tennessee. On July 29, Golden and Tom Prichard lost to Tony Givens and Robbie Cassidy in an interpromotional "Championship Wrestling vs. Iron Ring Wrestling" match. On August 12 at "Fire On The Mountain 2006", Golden was disqualified in his match against Nick Hammonds. On September 2, Golden and Stan Lee lost to Skull and Frank "The Tank" Parker at Great Southern Championship Wrestling's "Hostile Takeover" in Hickory, North Carolina. October 21, 2006, at a Championship Wrestling show in Kingsport, Golden lost an 8-man tag team match with Chris Richards, Brad Thomas, and Allen King against Tony Givens, Robbie Cassidy, Wayne Adkins, and Nick Hammonds when his team was disqualified. On April 14, 2007, Golden and Allen King lost a tag team match to Tony Givens and Robbie Cassidy at another Championship Wrestling event in Kingsport. He and King subsequently had a falling out and faced each other in a grudge match at Championship Wrestling's "Collision Course 3", the promotion's flagship supercard, on May 25, 2007.

=== NWA All-Star Wrestling (2007) ===
Golden and Stan Lee were brought into NWA All-Star Wrestling to challenge then tag team champions Bobby Houston and Iron Cross in the summer of 2007. On June 2, 2007, The Beautiful Blondes and K. C. Thunder lost to Bobby Houston, Iron Cross, and Jerry "The King" Lawler at the Dukes of Hazard Festival in Nashville, Tennessee. He and K. C. Thunder won the tag belts the following month, however, on the August 4th edition of NWA All-Star Wrestling in Bristol, Tennessee. They won the match when Iron Cross turned on his partner but afterwards the masked wrestler took off his mask revealing himself as Stan Lee. They successfully defended the titles against E. Z. Money and Cody Ices via disqualification in Lebanon, Virginia.

=== Independent circuit (2008–2009) ===
On February 15, 2008, Eddie and Jimmy Golden (with Stan Lee) appeared on SSW's 17th Anniversary Show against K. C. Thunder and Wayen Adkins. Golden and Lee later participated in a "SSW Legends" battle royal that same night. That summer, Golden began wrestling with Thunder as the fourth version of The Heavenly Bodies. The team won their first titles in the New Frontier Wrestling Association by defeating champions Jamar Acid and Cornbread in Franklin, North Carolina, on May 24. On June 3, Golden (with Holly Trinity) defeated The Tennessee Stud (with Dawn Renea) for National Championship Wrestling at North Wilkes High School; Renea would later become a valet for Golden and Thunder. On July 19, The Heavenly Bodies beat Chris Damien and Adam Logan on a NFWA show at the National Guard Armory in Franklin. On August 16 at "Total Chaos", Golden and Thunder were scheduled to face The Saturday Nigh Sensation (Matt Sells and Ryan Michaels) for the NFWA Tag Team Championship. Golen was unable to attend the event and was replaced by Chris Hamrick. On December 6, 2008, The Heavenly Bodies challenged NWA All-Star Wrestling Tag Team Champions Iron Cross and Stan Lee in a Texas Tornado death match at an NWA All-Star Wrestling fundraiser for Lebanon Middle School. According to the pre-match stipulation, The Heavenly Bodies' valet Dawn Renae would have her head shaved if the team failed to win the belts.

On July 24, 2009, Golden and Jeff Tankersley wrestled David and Reid Flair for Iron Ring Wrestling in Kingsport. The two men attacked Ric Flair earlier that night while giving a speech to the audience. The former world champion was saved by his sons and managed them in their match at the end of the night. Golden did several shows for Tony Givens' Championship Wrestling Alliance (later known as NWA Smokey Mountain Wrestling) during early-2010. On January 23, 2010, Golden defeats Kole Layton King at "House Party 2010" in Johnson City, Tennessee. On March 6, at CWA's 6th Anniversary Show, Golden wrestled in the 2010 Best of the Best tournament and was eliminated by Robbie Cassidy in the first round.

=== Return to Southern States Wrestling (2010–2011) ===
Golden returned to Southern States Wrestling in the summer of 2010. On June 26, Golden (with Jeff Tankersley) wrestled Beau James at "Legends Night 2010" in Kingsport, Tennessee. On July 25 at "WrestleFest 2010", Golden and Tankersley wrestled Beau James and Dutch Mantel to a no-contest when David Flair interfered. On the June 20th edition of SSW's weekly television show SSW Power Half Hour Golden and Tankersley wrestled David Flair and Jerry "The King" Lawler. On September 18, 2010, at "Fall Spectacular 2010", he took part in a 6-man tag team match with Tankersley and Jimmy Golden, to battle Beau James, Dutch Mantell, and Jerry Lawler. On February 18, 2011, Golden appeared at SSW's 20th Anniversary Show in Kingsport, Tennessee where he lost to Johnny Knievel.

=== NWA Smoky Mountain Wrestling (2011–2013) ===
On April 1, 2011, Golden took part in the NWA Smoky Mountain Wrestling Cup tournament at the Civic Auditorium in Kingsport, Tennessee. He was eliminated by NWA Mountain Empire Heavyweight Champion Chase Owens in the opening rounds.

In the spring of 2013, Golden once again began feuding with Jeff Tankersley. This latest feud was triggered when Golden interfered in an April 6 match between Tankersley and Jimmy Golden that allowed his uncle to win the bout. The two men faced off at NWA Smoky Mountain's "Collision Course 9" in Kingsport on May 18. On October 12, 2013, Golden and E. Z. Money challenged NWA Smoky Mountain Tag Team Champions Air America (Skylar Kruze and Gavin Daring) at Hampton High School in Hampton, Tennessee.

=== Independent circuit (2014–present) ===
On June 14, 2014, Golden reunited with Stan Lee at Reborn Wrestling's "Once Bitten, Twice Shy" in Johnson City, a tribute show honoring Jake "The Snake" Roberts, where they lost to Air America (Skylar Kruze and Gavin Daring). The Beautiful Blondes began abusing their valet Brooklynn after the match, blaming her for their defeat, who was rescued by Air America. Although they lost the match, the tag team bout "stole the show" according to 411mania.com and praised all four men for their "enormous talent and athleticism".

On June 16, 2018, Golden was defeated by Jeff Tankersley in a Bunkhouse Match at Innovate Wrestling’s Stars for Heroes event. Golden made a return to the ring on April 16, 2022, in Elizabethton, Tennessee, in a six-man tag team match, teaming with his son Evan Golden and Stan Lee. The Golden’s and Lee were defeated by Wayne Adkins and The Tennessee Hillbillies.

Golden was inducted into the Carter County Professional Wrestling Hall of Fame on April 6, 2024 in Elizabethton, Tennessee.

On June 29, 2025, Golden teamed alongside his son Evan at Smoky Mountain Pro Wrestling to defeat KC Cazana and Ryan Mantis for the SMP East Tennessee Tag Team Championships in Newport, Tennessee. On September 20, The Golden’s tagged alongside Colin Casanova and Conner Drake in a losing effort to Chris Hamrick, Tristen Williams, Ben Wright, and Chase Lovelace at Heritage Wrestling Alliance in Rutherfordton, North Carolina.

== Personal life ==
Golden married Natalie Dupree in 1995. His son Evan debuted as a professional wrestler in 2021.

== Championships and accomplishments ==
- All-American Wrestling
  - AAW Tag Team Championship (1 time) – with Stan Lee
- All-State Wrestling
  - ASW Junior Heavyweight Championship (2 times)
- All Pro Wrestling
  - APW Tag Team Championship (2 times) – with Stan Lee
- American Wrestling Federation
  - AWF Cruiserweight Championship (2 times)
- Appalachian Mountain Wrestling
  - AMW Southeastern Championship (1 time)
  - AMW Tag Team Championship (1 time) – with Ricky Harrison
- Iron Ring Wrestling
  - IRW Heavyweight Championship (1 time)
  - IRW Tag Team Championship (1 time) – with Jimmy Golden
- National Championship Wrestling
  - NCW United States Heavyweight Championship (1 time)
- New Frontier Wrestling Association
  - NFWA Tag Team Championship (1 time) – with K. C. Thunder
- NWA All-Star Wrestling
  - NWA All-Star Tag Team Championship (1 time) – with K. C. Thunder
- NWA Wildside
  - NWA Wildside Television Championship (3 times)
- Pro Wrestling Illustrated
  - PWI ranked Eddie Golden # 457 of the 500 best singles wrestlers of the PWI 500 in 1993
  - PWI ranked Eddie Golden # 443 of the 500 best singles wrestlers of the PWI 500 in 1994
  - PWI ranked Eddie Golden # 232 of the 500 best singles wrestlers of the PWI 500 in 1995
  - PWI ranked Eddie Golden # 226 of the 500 best singles wrestlers of the PWI 500 in 1996
  - PWI ranked Eddie Golden # 235 of the 500 best singles wrestlers of the PWI 500 in 1997
  - PWI ranked Eddie Golden # 279 of the 500 best singles wrestlers of the PWI 500 in 1998
  - PWI ranked Eddie Golden # 334 of the 500 best singles wrestlers of the PWI 500 in 2000
  - PWI ranked Eddie Golden # 262 of the 500 best singles wrestlers of the PWI 500 in 2001
- Smoky Mountain Pro
  - SMP East Tennessee Tag Team Championship (1 time) – with Evan Golden
- Southeastern Championship Wrestling
  - SECW Tag Team Championship (3 times) – with Big Ox
- Southern States Wrestling
  - SSW Junior Heavyweight Championship (3 times)
  - SSW Tag Team Championship (2 times) – with Stan Lee and Alex Shane
- Tennessee Championship Wrestling
  - TCW Tag Team Championship (1 time) – with Stan Lee
- Tennessee Mountain Wrestling
  - TMW Junior Heavyweight Championship (1 time)
- United Atlantic Championship Wrestling
  - UACW Tag Team Championship (1 time, first) – with Stan Lee
