= Anderson family =

Professional wrestling stable

The Anderson family is a fictitious family of professional wrestlers, largely consisting of billed brothers, cousins and children.

== Gene Anderson ==
NWA Hall of Famer Gene Anderson (the pioneer of the group), born in Minneapolis, Minnesota, started his professional wrestling career in 1958. Gene was trained by WWE Hall of Famer Verne Gagne.

== The Minnesota Wrecking Crew ==
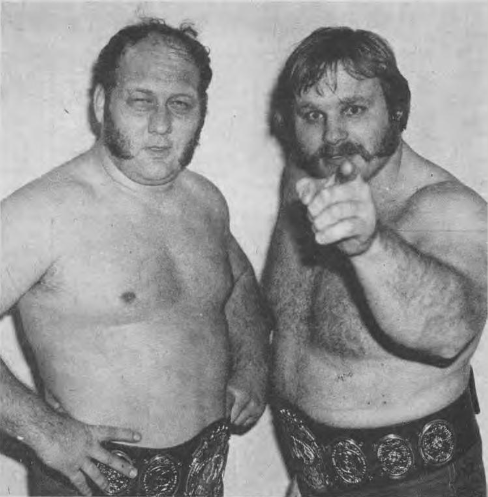
Gene and Ole Anderson teaming as The Minnesota Wrecking Crew

After spending a few years working for Stu Hart's Canadian wrestling promotion Stampede Wrestling, Gene started working for Verne Gagne's Minneapolis, Minnesota based American Wrestling Association (AWA) in 1961. In 1965, Gene formed the tag team The Minnesota Wrecking Crew with fellow Minnesota native Larry Heiniemi, who had started his professional wrestling career that same year.

=== Lars Anderson ===
Larry, who had been performing under his real name, became Lars Anderson and was billed as being Gene's brother.

=== Ole Anderson ===
In 1968, while working for Paul Jones' Georgia Championship Wrestling (GCW), Gene invited Alan Rogowski, who had been wrestling as Rock Rogowski since he started his professional wrestling career the year prior, to join the team. Alan began performing as Ole Anderson, the brother of Gene and Lars. The three would team together in different combinations until Lars moved to Hawaii in 1969. After Lars moved, Gene and Ole continued the team and Lars would only make sporadic appearances from then on. Gene and Ole remained a team until 1982.

=== Arn Anderson ===
While working for Bill Watts' Mid-South Wrestling Association (MSW) in 1983, Martin Lunde, who started his professional wrestling career in 1981, was sitting in the locker room during an MSW event when Watts was having a conversation with Matt Osborne, Ted DiBiase and Jim Duggan. The three men Watts were talking to were nearing the end of their run with MSW and Watts was sending them to Atlanta, Georgia to work for GCW, which was owned by Jim Barnett at the time. Watts told Osborne that he was going to be managed by Paul Ellering and that he would be performing as a part of a tag team. Watts explained that they needed to find Osborne a tag team partner when Sylvester Ritter (Junkyard Dog), who was also in the locker room, suggested that since Martin strongly resembled Ole Anderson, who was currently working in GCW, he should be sent over to GCW as an Anderson and be Osborne's tag team partner. Watts looked over at Martin and agreed that he did in fact look a lot like Ole and then made the decision to send him to GCW as well.

When Martin arrived in Atlanta he introduced himself to Ole who immediately reacted to the fact that Martin did in fact look like him. Ole gave Martin, who had previously wrestled under his real name and Super Olympia, the new name Arn Anderson. Arn was ultimately billed as the brother of Gene, Lars and Ole but at other times he was billed as a cousin or nephew. Ole and Arn would start teaming together later that year, shortly after Arn's tag partner Osborne was released from GCW. Ole and Arn would remain a team until Ole retired in 1987.

In combined total, the four original Andersons were tag team champions 41 times, winning 12 different tag team championships across the United States. Several modern tag teams have taken names similar to the Minnesota Wrecking Crew as an homage to the group.

== Ric Flair ==
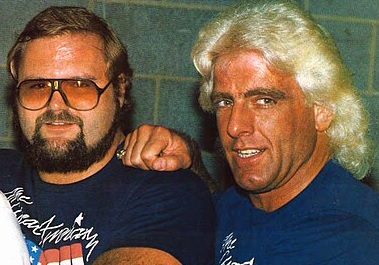
Ric Flair (right) with Arn Anderson in 1987

As early as 1974, the 2 time WWE Hall of Famer Ric Flair was being billed as the cousin of Ole and Gene, teaming with them sporadically until 1977.

In 1977, Flair teamed with Blackjack Mulligan and Greg Valentine in a feud against his storyline cousins Gene and Ole. In 1981, Ric reunited with Gene and Ole.

In 1985, while working for Southeastern Championship Wrestling (SECW), Arn was asked by SECW promoter Robert Fuller to ride with Flair while he was there working for the promotion. Arn, who was a fan of Flair, gladly accepted. Flair later convinced Arn to make the move from SECW, where he was very comfortable in his position in both his wrestling career and living situation in Pensacola, Florida, to Jim Crockett's Mid-Atlantic Championship Wrestling (MACW). Arn would once again need Flair's convincing when Arn was prepared to leave MACW after receiving a payout that was less than he was making with SECW. During this time in MACW, Flair began working as a team with Ole and Arn in different combinations in a feud against WWE Hall of Famer Dusty Rhodes, Magnum T. A., Billy Jack Haynes and Manny Fernandez.

== Rip Hawk ==
In 1974, at the same time as being billed as an Anderson cousin, Flair was also being billed as the nephew of American professional wrestler Rip Hawk. Hawk was by extension billed as related to the Anderson family.

== The Four Horsemen ==
In June 1984, Flair began a feud with Tully Blanchard, until November 1985 when they became a team. In early 1986, Flair and Blanchard allied themselves with Flair's storyline cousins Ole and Arn. Shortly afterward, J. J. Dillon, who was already managing Blanchard, joined the team as their manager. According to Arn Anderson, the team finally felt complete when Dillon joined the group.

During an impromptu interview after an 8 man tag team match that the group won, Arn said, "The only time this much havoc had been wreaked by this few a number of people, you need to go all the way back to the Four Horsemen of the Apocalypse". The name The Four Horsemen stuck and the team used that name going forward.

Over the following years the team would change in combination of different variations of existing and new members, including; Lex Luger, Barry Windham, Sting, Sid Vicious, Paul Roma, Brian Pillman, Chris Benoit, Steve McMichael, Curt Hennig, Dean Malenko and Jeff Jarrett. Flair and Arn were part of every iteration of the team until August 25, 1997 during World Championship Wrestling (WCW)'s live television broadcast of their TNT Network program Monday Nitro, Arn formally announced his retirement from in-ring work.

The stable was a major influence on professional wrestling in North America, creating the blueprint for future groups such as the New World Order, The Triple Threat, Evolution, The Four Horsewomen, The Pinnacle, The Extreme Horsemen and Fortune.

== Other storyline relatives ==
Other professional wrestlers, under the Anderson heritage popped up on the independent circuit in the 1990s.

=== Rocky Anderson ===
Rocky Mills was the head trainer at Gene Anderson's gym. Rocky wrestled on the independent circuit as Rocky Anderson, a member of the Anderson family.

=== The Andersons ===
==== Pat Anderson ====
Rocky was contacted by Ivan Koloff who told him he had been training a guy named Pat Connors, who both looked and wrestled like an Anderson. Rocky attended a show in Monroe, North Carolina to watch Pat perform. Rocky was impressed and with the blessings of Gene he allowed Pat to use the Anderson gimmick. Pat worked his entire career as Pat Anderson.

==== C. W. Anderson ====
Shortly afterwards Pat met Christopher Wright at a show he was working at for Carolina Championship Wrestling Alliance (CCWA). Pat was impressed with Christopher's skills and looks, so before approaching him Pat asked the CCWA booker Jim Massingale if he could work as a tag team together with Christopher. Pat and Christopher had a conversation and Christopher agreed to the tag team work. Gene Anderson had died at this point so Pat called Rocky to ask for permission to make Christopher an Anderson. Rocky told Pat to use his judgement and Christopher began performing as C. W. Anderson.

During their time as a tag team Pat and C. W. were tag team champions 9 times, including the NWA World Tag Team Championship titles and they held 3 tag team championship titles from 3 different promotions concurrently.

==== Karl Anderson ====
Briefly at the beginning of Karl Anderson's career, NJPW higher ups believed he showed strong similarities to the Andersons leading to a brief run as one, even adopting the spinebuster before becoming "The Machine Gun" and a loyal member of the Bullet Club.

== Anderson family members ==
- Storyline brothers:
  - Gene Anderson
  - Lars Anderson (Larry Heiniemi)
  - Ole Anderson (Alan Rogowski)
  - Arn Anderson (Marty Lunde)
- Storyline uncle
  - Rip Hawk (Harvey Evers) Swede Hanson also was an “Uncle”
- Storyline cousins:
  - Ric Flair (Richard Fliehr)
  - Pat Anderson (Pat Connors)
  - C. W. Anderson (Chris Wright)
- Other storyline relatives:
  - Rocky Anderson (Rocky Mills)
  - Karl Anderson (Chad Allegra)
- Children
  - Brad Anderson (son of Gene)
  - Bryant Anderson (son of Ole)
  - David Flair (son of Ric Flair)
  - Reid Flair (Reid Fliehr) (son of Ric Flair)
  - Charlotte Flair (Ashley Fliehr) (daughter of Ric Flair)
  - Brock Anderson (son of Arn)

== Championships and accomplishments ==
- Andrew Anderson
  - Championships and accomplishments
- Arn Anderson
  - Championships and accomplishments
- C. W. Anderson
  - Championships and accomplishments
- The Four Horsemen
  - Championships and accomplishments
- Gene Anderson
  - Championships and accomplishments
- Lars Anderson
  - Championships and accomplishments
- The Minnesota Wrecking Crew
  - Championships and accomplishments
- Ole Anderson
  - Championships and accomplishments
- Pat Anderson
  - Championships and accomplishments
- Ric Flair
  - Championships and accomplishments
- Rip Hawk
  - Championships and accomplishments
