= Neckbreaker =

Wrestling move

In professional wrestling, a neckbreaker is any throw or slam that focuses its attack on the opponent's neck. One type of neckbreaker involves the wrestler slamming an opponent's neck against a part of the wrestler's body, usually the knee, head or shoulder. The other type of neckbreaker is a slam technique in which the wrestler throws an opponent to the ground by twisting the opponent's neck. This also refers to a "back head slam" where a wrestler drops to the mat while holding an opponent by their neck.

== Variations ==
=== Argentine neckbreaker ===
The attacking wrestler first places their opponent face-up across their shoulders, as in an Argentine backbreaker rack, and hooks the opponent's head with one hand and their leg with the other. From here, the attacking wrestler throws the legs of the opponent out backwards and drops down to the mat while holding onto the opponent's head, dragging the opponent down with them to drive their back into the ground and the back of the opponent's neck into the shoulder of the attacking wrestler. Used by Manabu Nakanishi as Hercules Cutter.

=== Arm trap neckbreaker ===
This move sees an attacking wrestler take hold of an arm of an opponent and then move to a back to back position, so that the opponent's arm hooks across and round the opponent's own head. At this point, the attacking wrestler falls backwards to the ground, forcing the opponent's own arm to drag them to the mat. A straight jacket variation, also known as a cross-armed neckbreaker and double handcuff neckbreaker, exists and sees where the wrestler face their opponent, grab both of their arms and twist around so they have their opponent in a straight jacket hold before finally dropping down to drag the opponent to the floor. Popularized by William Regal as the Regal Cutter.

=== Butterfly neckbreaker ===
The wrestler and opponent face each other, the opponent bent forward. The wrestler hooks the opponent's arms back in a butterfly, placing his forearms in the crooks of the opponent's elbows, with his hands on top of the opponent's back in a butcher's grip. The wrestler then lifts the opponent into an upside-down vertical position while rotating the opponent, then falls to their back while maintaining the hold, dragging the opponent down with them to drive their back into the ground as in a neckbreaker slam. Will Ospreay would use a corkscrew version as the Storm Breaker.

=== Corkscrew neckbreaker ===
Also known as a standing somersault neckbreaker and/or rolling neckbreaker, this move sees the attacking wrestler place the opponent in a three-quarter facelock and perform a somersault forwards, then falls down supine, using the momentum of the flip to twist the opponent's neck and back into the ground. Popularized by John Morrison as the Moonlight Drive.

=== Diving neckbreaker ===
The attacking wrestler jumps from a raised platform (usually the second turnbuckle) and grabs an opponent's neck while in midair, thereby taking them down. Evan Golden popularized a diving somersault neckbreaker variation called the Super Afterburner.

=== Elevated neckbreaker ===
An elevated neckbreaker refers to any neckbreaker performed on an opponent who is held on an elevated position. Normally a wrestler places the opponent on the turnbuckle so that they face away from the ring. The wrestler takes hold of the opponent by their neck, and from this position performs many variations of the neckbreaker, like falling to a sitting or kneeling position, or just running forward and pulling the opponent away from the corner, and dropping them in a standard neckbreaker. There are also double team variations.

==== Cradle elevated neckbreaker ====
In this variation of a muscle buster, which focuses more of the attack on the neck, a wrestler holds the opponent upside-down, with both legs hooked and with the back of the opponent's neck against the wrestler's shoulder, and then drops to a kneeling or sitting position so that the opponent’s neck hits against the shoulder. It is usually performed against an opponent who is sitting on the top turnbuckle. R-Truth used this during his TNA stint as the Consequence.

==== Crucifix elevated neckbreaker ====
The move sees a wrestler places the opponent's head in between their legs, then grabs the opponent's stomach, lifts the opponent over their shoulder, and holds both their arms in a cross position over their head. The wrestler finally runs or falls while holding the opponent's neck and dropping them in their back of the neck. Former WWE superstar JTG uses this as the Brooklyn's Edge. A spinning version of this move also exist which instead sees the wrestler with one arm over the opponent's neck while spinning in place using the centripetal force of the opponent to render them near vertical before falling backwards, slamming the opponent's neck across their shoulder or the ground.

==== Gutwrench elevated neckbreaker ====
A move in which the attacking wrestler performs a gutwrench and lifts the opponent so that their back rests across one of the wrestler's shoulders. The wrestler then reaches forward with both hands and grabs the opponent under the chin. At this point, the wrestler would drop down to the mat backwards, causing the opponent to drop from an elevated height and land on the back of their neck.

=== Fireman's carry neckbreaker ===
Also known as the Ushigoroshi. The move sees a wrestler take an opponent across their shoulders in a fireman's carry. Once there the wrestler does a fireman's carry slam, extending the knee adjacent to the opponent's face and neck. The opponent then lands neck-first across the extended knee, snapping their neck in a similar manner to a shoulder neckbreaker. Used by Hirooki Goto and KENTA. Shawn Spears used this move as signature move during his second tenure in the WWE under the name Tye Dillinger, originally calling this move the Tye-Breaker. Former WWE superstar and current AEW superstar Adam Cole has been using this move as well.

=== Gator Roll ===
This neckbreaker variation is based on an amateur wrestling technique that requires the wrestler to capture their opponent in a front facelock, as well trap the arm closest to the wrestler's body in the facelock. The wrestler will then spin their body opposite the opponent, either releasing their opponent or continuing to spin with the hold intact. The wrestler can perform the move from a standing position for more impact or from a kneeling position as a wear-down hold.

=== Hip toss neckbreaker ===
A hip toss neckbreaker involves the attacker delivering a hip toss to the opponent, and while the opponent is falling down on their back in mid-air, the attacker grabs the opponent's head and neck to execute a neckbreaker, falling down to the mat with the opponent.

=== Inverted facelock neckbreaker ===
This move sees the wrestler stand behind the opponent, bends them backwards, and apply an inverted facelock. The wrestler then drops down to a single knee with the extended knee impacting with the neck of the opponent.

=== Neckbreaker slam ===
Also known as a falling neckbreaker, this move sees the attacking wrestler stand back to back with their opponent, then reaches over their shoulder and takes hold of the opponent by their head or neck. The wrestler then falls to their back while maintaining the hold, dragging the opponent down with them to drive their back into the ground. This move is often used by a wrestler who ducks under an attempted attack by the opponent, such as a clothesline, and is thus back to back with their opponent. A jumping variation also exists. Sasha Banks uses a twist-to-knees variation dubbed "Bankrupt."

==== Straitjacket neck breaker slam ====
Similar to a neck breaker slam, this move sees the attacking wrestler back to back with the wrestler they plan to attack. The attacker then grabs the opponents wrists and wraps the opponents arms around their neck. The attacking wrestler then holds the wrists or arms of the opponent, proceeding to pull the arm or hands down to the mat. The opponent and attacking wrestler both land on their backs side to side, with the opponent taking full impact of the move. This move was popularized by Gail Kim who used it as a finisher in the early years of her career in TNA and proceeded to make it a signature move of hers after her second run in WWE.

==== Inverted facelock neckbreaker slam ====
This is a move in which a wrestler places their opponent in an inverted facelock and then pivots 180°, catching the opponent's head with their free arm (or both arms) and then dropping down onto their back so that both wrestlers are in a supine position, as in a neckbreaker slam. This move is also known as a "Reverse Twist of Fate".Used by Reby Sky.

=== Overdrive ===
Also known as the leg-assisted swinging neckbreaker. This is a version of a swinging neckbreaker where the attacking wrestler would use a leg rather than hands to perform the twist. With the opponent bent forwards (presumes the opponent is spun around, neck landing on the inside of the wrestler's knee. Used by MVP as the Playmaker. Randy Orton used this in OVW and his early WWE career as the Ozone.

==== Inverted overdrive ====
A move described as an inverted overdrive is another version of a swinging neckbreaker, in which the attacking wrestler would use a leg (in this case a knee) rather than hands to perform the twist. In this move a wrestler would first place one knee (the one closest to an opponent) against the base of the opponent's neck, who is leaning forward, while underhooking one of the opponent's arms (the furthest one) before falling backwards down to the mat as the opponent is spun over, landing on the back of the head on the attacking wrestler's knee. Briefly used by Zack Ryder as the Zack Attack.

=== Pumphandle neckbreaker ===
This version of the neckbreaker sees the attacking wrestler put the opponent in a half nelson pumphandle position, lift them up as one would with a vertical suplex, and then drop down onto one knee as the opponent's neck is sent down onto the other knee. Used by Kevin Steen as the Steen Breaker.

=== Shoulder neckbreaker ===
Better known as a hangman's neckbreaker and also known as a kneeling neckbreaker or a sitout neckbreaker. From a back to back position, the attacking wrestler reaches back and pulls the opponent's head over their shoulder, then drops to a sitting, kneeling, or a split-legged position, causing the back of the opponent's neck to impact on the shoulder of the attacking wrestler. Another version of this move is similar to the neckbreaker slam which sees both wrestlers fall to their backs with the opponent's neck being forced down to the mat instead of onto the attacking wrestler's shoulder. A swinging version also exists. This move was the longtime finisher for "Ravishing" Rick Rude, who called it the Rude Awakening, and was also the finisher of former WWE wrestler Layla, who referred to the move as The LayOut.

==== Gory neckbreaker ====
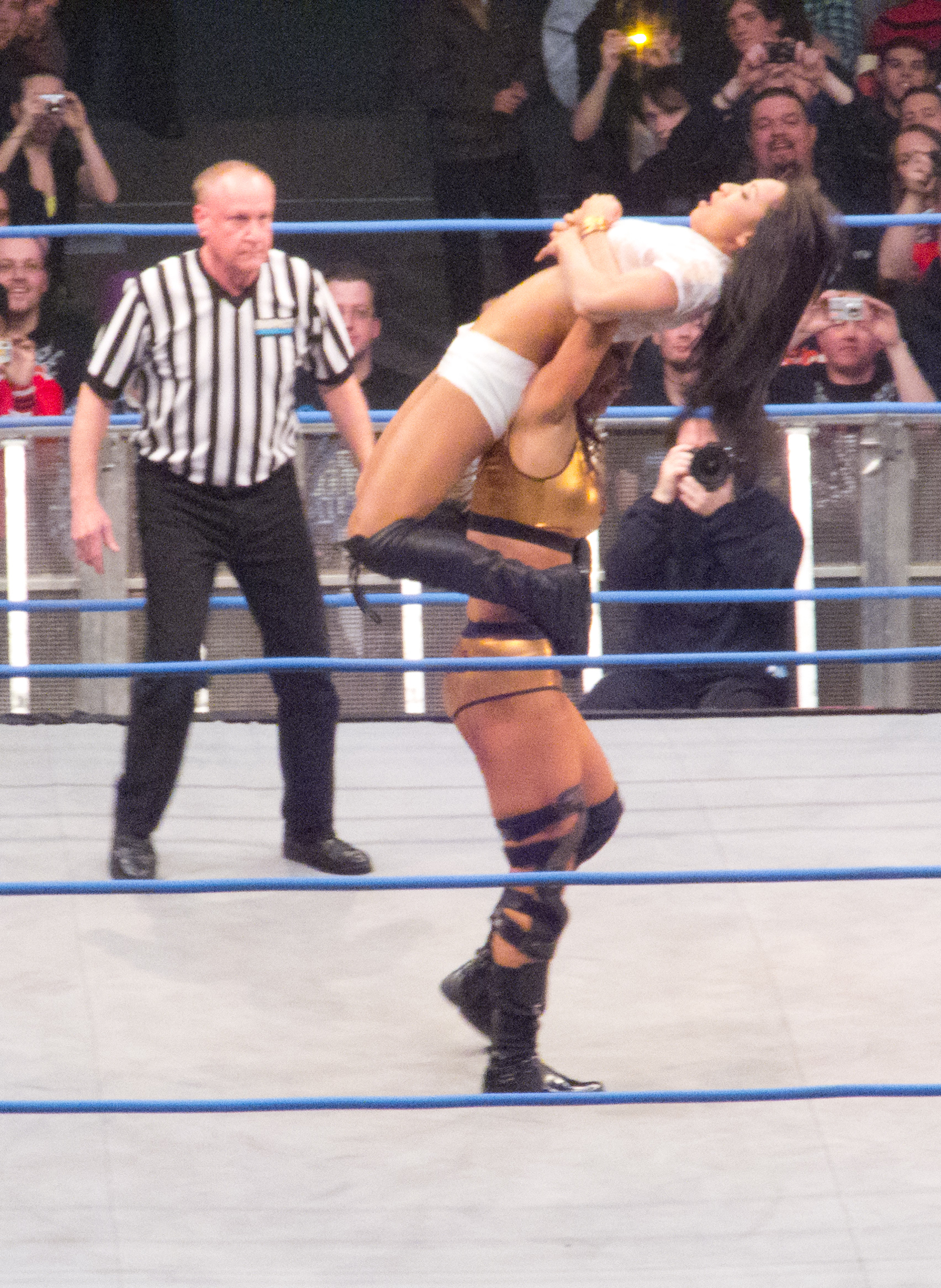
Victoria setting up the Widow's Peak (gory neckbreaker) on Gail Kim

The elevated shoulder neckbreaker, first sees the attacking wrestler lift an opponent into a position where the opponent and the wrestler are back to back with the opponent's head pulled across the shoulder of the attacking wrestler and their legs hooked over the wrestler's legs (the Gory special). From this position the attacking wrestler will drop to a sitting or kneeling position, driving the back of the opponent's neck into the shoulder of an attacking wrestler and the knees of the opponent into the mat. This move can also see the opponent's neck placed over the attacking wrestler's head instead of their shoulder. This move was popularized by Victoria as the Widow's Peak. Peyton Royce uses this as her signature move called Deja Vu.

=== Somersault neckbreaker ===
Also known as a front flip neckbreaker, the attacking wrestler stands in front of and facing a sitting opponent before running toward them and performing a somersault over them. As the wrestler falls, they grab the opponent by the head or neck, driving the opponent's head backwards to mat with both wrestlers landing on their backs. The maneuver can also be used against a standing opponent, usually when they are bent over. The standing variation can be used as a counter to a vertical suplex or a similar maneuver. Popularized by Buff Bagwell as the Blockbuster. Naomi also uses this move, sometimes from the second rope. Ace Austin uses a running variant known as The Fold. Evan Golden utilizes the running variant as his finisher, calling it the Afterburner.

==== Neck snap ====
In this variation, the attacking wrestler stands behind and facing a sitting opponent before running toward them and performing a somersault over them. As the wrestler falls, they grab the opponent by the back of the head or neck, pushing it downwards as they drop to the mat. This causes the opponent to jerk their neck backwards, snapping it to the mat. Curt Hennig popularized it throughout his career. John Cena's version is where he would run towards a bent over opponent from behind and then perform a somersault over them driving the face of the opponent into the mat called the Throwback.

=== Swinging neckbreaker ===
The attacking wrestler applies a front facelock while they place their hands side by side under each other shoulder and uses their free hand to grab hold of the opponent's far hand before swinging over the opponent and down to the ground, in a semi-circular motion, so that both the wrestler and the opponent fall to the ground back-first, causing the back of the opponent's neck to impact on the shoulder of the attacking wrestler. One variation sees the attacking wrestler fall to a seated position, slamming the opponent's neck into the mat between their legs. Another version that sees the attacking wrestler swing inward, throwing the opponent over and to the ground, is often referred to as a whiplash. Eve Torres uses this move, calling it The Heart Breaker. Lexis King uses a cross-arm variant as a finisher, calling it the Dire Promises during his time in AEW and the Coronation during his time in WWE. CM Punk uses a variation where he first twists the opponent's arm before performing the move.

One variation, known as a Swinging neckbomb, sees the attacking wrestler fall to a seated position slamming the opponent's neck into the mat between their legs.

==== Swinging fisherman's neckbreaker ====
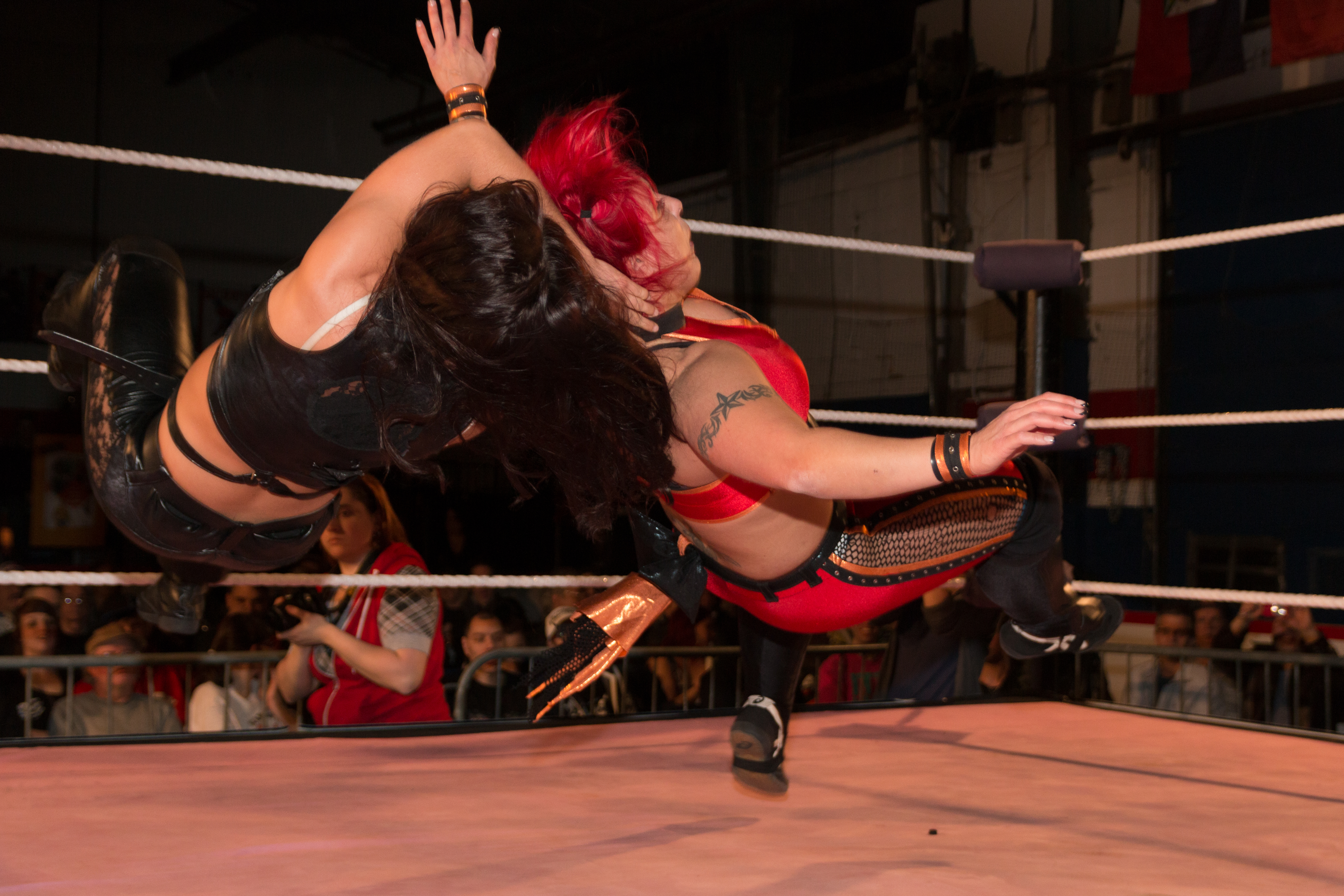
Nikki Storm (left) performing a swinging fisherman's neckbreaker on Lufisto

Similar to the swinging neckbreaker The attacking wrestler puts the opponent's arm over the back of their neck, and they put their arm on the back of the opponent's neck. The attacker then rotates their arms around the opponent's neck and bring both of them down to the ground, in a semi-circular motion, so that both the wrestler and the opponent fall to the ground back-first, causing the back of the opponent's neck to impact on the shoulder of the attacking wrestler, difference being with this version is that it sees the attacking wrestler grab the back of the opponent's thigh in the same way that the fisherman suplex is grabbed. Nikki Cross currently uses this moves; she calls it The Purge. This move was used by former wrestler Tyson Kidd and Daffney during her tenure in TNA.

==== Snap swinging neckbreaker ====
The standard version of this move is in a style similar to that of a swinging neckbreaker, in which the wrestler holds them in a front facelock, keeping their heads side by side under each other shoulder. At this point the attacking wrestler swings inward as they dive to the ground, twisting on the opponent's neck and in the process, driving their neck and shoulders into the ground.

An elevated version first sees the attacking wrestler raise an opponent off the ground, often using a suplex lift, to place the opponent's leg on the top ring rope so that they are face-down while the wrestler holds them in a front facelock, keeping their heads side by side under each other shoulder, making the wrestler the only other thing than the ring ropes keeping the opponent off the ground. At this point the attacking wrestler swings inward as they dive to the ground, twisting on the opponent's neck and in the process lifting the opponent's entire body off the rope, driving their neck and shoulders into the ground. A double team version of this move also exists. This is also a variant of the Whiplash in which a wrestler lifts up their opponent like a suplex and then swings them around into a neckbreaker. This move is similar to the Swinging Vertical Suplex. This move is being used by Dustin Rhodes as the Final Cut in WWE as Goldust or the Final Reckoning in AEW. Nikki Cross currently uses this move as her finisher. She calls it Whiplash.

Another slight variation of the (standing) whiplash move sees the attacking wrestler hook both the opponent's legs (as in a cradle suplex) while keeping both their heads side by side under each other shoulder before then performing the whiplash.

Elias uses this as his finisher, calling it the Drift Away.

== See also ==
- Cutter - a three-quarter facelock neckbreaker
- Professional wrestling throws
