= SSW Junior Heavyweight Championship =

Professional wrestling championship

Details
- Promotion: Southern States Wrestling
- Date established: March 30, 1992
Statistics
- First champion(s): Eddie Golden
- Most reigns: Eddie Golden (3)
- Longest reign: Ray Idol (387 days)
- Shortest reign: Alex Shane (28 days); Eddie Golden (28 days)

The Southern States Wrestling (SSW) Junior Heavyweight Championship is a secondary professional wrestling championship in Southern States Wrestling. Eddie Golden was the inaugural champion, defeating Jamie Gibson in Banner Elk, North Carolina on March 30, 1992. The title is generally defended in the Southern United States, most often in its home base in East Tennessee, but also as far away as North Carolina. It was retired and revived twice before being renamed the Championship Wrestling Junior Heavyweight Championship in June 2004. There are 7 recognized known champions with a total of 10 title reigns.

== Title history ==
Wrestler:	Times:	Date:	Location:	Notes:
Eddie Golden	1	March 30, 1992	Banner Elk, North Carolina	Defeated Jamie Gibson to become the first champion.
Alex Shane	1	April 30, 1993	Fall Branch, Tennessee	
Eddie Golden	2	May 28, 1993	Sullivan Gardens, Tennessee	
Alex Shane	2	June 25, 1993	Fall Branch, Tennessee	
The Shogun	1	April 8, 1994	Fall Branch, Tennessee	
Title becomes vacant when The Shogun leaves the promotion.'
Title history unrecorded'
Bobby Blaze	1	January 1995		
Title history unrecorded'
The Alabama Heartthrob	1	1995		
Eddie Golden	3	December 1, 1995	Fall Branch, Tennessee	
Title history unrecorded'
Title is abandoned'
Tony Givens	1	July 20, 2003	Kingsport, Tennessee	Won battle royal to win the revived title.
Shane Matthews	1	March 12, 2004	Kingsport, Tennessee	Defeated Tony Givens, Eric Darkstorm and Josh Cody in a 4 Way Ladder match.
Title is renamed the Championship Wrestling Junior Heavyweight Championship in June 2004.'
Championship Wrestling Junior Heavyweight Title
Clay Connors	1	November 26, 2004	Kingsport, Tennessee	Defeated Shane Matthews.
Ray Idol	1	2004	Kingsport, Tennessee	
Alyx Wynters	1	January 22, 2005	Kingsport, Tennessee	
