= Chief Jay Eagle =

American professional wrestler and promoter

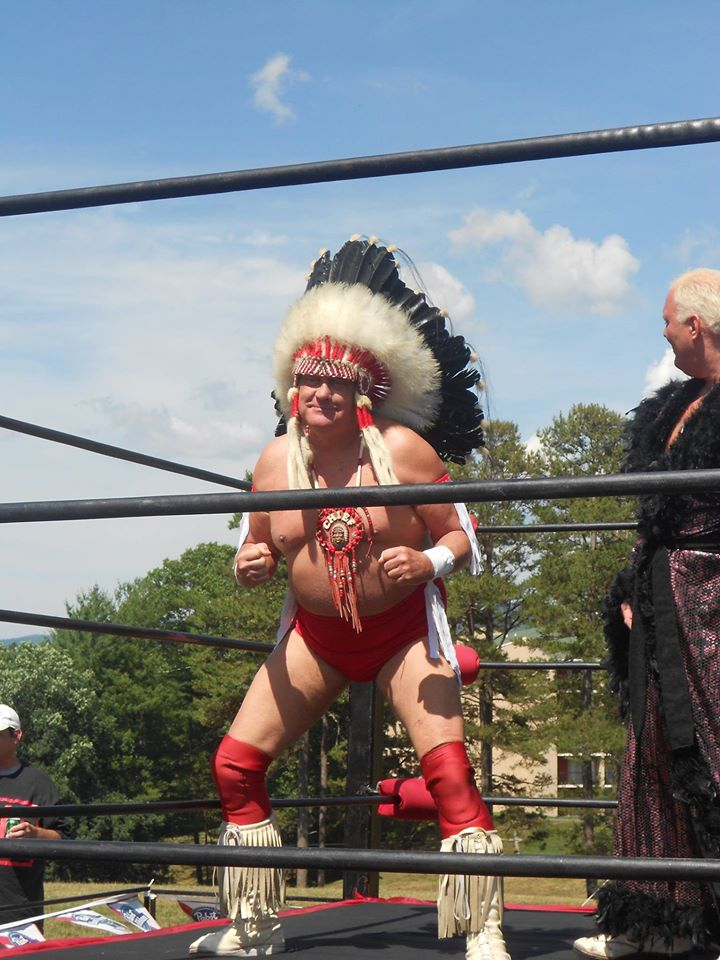
- Chief Jay Eagle in 2020

Personal information
- Born: Jerry Thomas Bragg; August 18, 1953 (age 73) Spartanburg, South Carolina, U.S.

Professional wrestling career
- Ring names: Chief Jay Eagle; Denny Wolfe; Jay Eagle; Jerry Bragg; Jerry Eagle; Jerry Eagles
- Billed height: 6 ft 1 in (1.85 m)
- Billed weight: 240 lb (110 kg)
- Billed from: Spartanburg, South Carolina
- Trained by: George South; Wahoo McDaniel
- Debut: 1975
- Retired: 2022

Jerry Thomas Bragg (born August 18, 1953), better known by the ring name Chief Jay Eagle, is an American retired professional wrestler, promoter and businessman. Bragg performed for many different wrestling companies in the NWA and the independent circuit. Bragg was the promoter of Southern Championship Wrestling (SCW), National Championship Wrestling (NCW) and Big Time Wrestling (BTW). Bragg is formerly the owner of American Pro Wrestling (Now known as Asylum Pro Wrestling), which has been running events since 1997.

== Professional wrestling career ==
=== Early career (1975–1983) ===
Bragg began his wrestling career in 1975, being trained by Wahoo McDaniel who was a hunting buddy of Bragg's Father. George South is also credited for training Bragg.

In one of Bragg's early matches against the tag team The Bandits his parents were in the crowd seeing their son perform for the first time. Bragg was set to take a beating and lose the match. His mother, Betty Bragg, jumped into the ring thinking he was in real danger and tried to protect him. Bragg said this embarrassing story is something he and his mother had to live with for years.

=== Georgia Championship Wrestling ===
Bragg performed for 6 weeks as Denny Wolfe for Georgia Championship Wrestling (GCW) as a jobber. This experience convinced him that working for smaller promotions was better for him.

=== Southern Championship Wrestling (1983–1990) ===
Bragg was the promoter for Southern Championship Wrestling (SCW) between 1983 and 1990.

=== South Atlantic Pro Wrestling (1990) ===
On the September 22, 1990 (taped previously) episode of South Atlantic Pro Wrestling (SAPW), Bragg teaming with David Isley were defeated by The Nasty Boys Brian Knobbs and Jerry Sags.

=== National Championship Wrestling (1990–1993) ===
Bragg was the promoter for National Championship Wrestling (NCW) between 1990 and 1993.

=== National Wrestling Alliance (1993) ===
Bragg performed for the National Wrestling Alliance (NWA) defeating Helmut Hessler on August 28, 1993.

=== Big Time Wrestling (1993–1998) ===
Bragg was the promoter for Big Time Wrestling (BTW) between 1993 and 1998.

On November 4, 1995, Big Time Wrestling (BTW) held an event at Meigs County High School in Pomeroy, Ohio. Bragg, in a losing effort, participated in a 6-man blindfold battle royal against Bobby Fulton, Lou Marconi, Paul Atlas, T. Rantula and The Grim Reaper, who won the match. Later on at the same event, Bragg defeated T. Rantula in a singles match.

==== Pro Wrestling Federation (1994–1995) ====
Bragg worked for Pro Wrestling Federation (PWF) between 1994 and 1995.

In 1994, Bragg defeated Russian Assassin in Inman, South Carolina, on August 6, Bragg was defeated by Texas Outlaw No. 1 in Forest City, North Carolina, on August 20, Star Ryder and The Flaming Youth win against Bragg and Chris Hamrick by disqualification in Forest City, North Carolina on November 25, and Bragg and Wahoo McDaniel defeat Chris Hamrick and Rick Michaels at the County Fair in Charlotte, North Carolina, on December 10.

In 1995, Bragg and Chris Hamrick win against Damage Inc. Scott Powers and Too Hot Thomas by disqualification in Inman, South Carolina on January 7 and Chris Hamrick and Terry Austin defeat Bragg and The Italian Stallion in Inman, South Carolina, on December 2.

==== Southern Championship Wrestling (1994) ====
On October 22, 1994, Bragg defeated Mad Dog in an Indian strap match at the National Guard Armory in King's Mountain, North Carolina. Less than a week later, on October 17, Bragg would wrestle and defeat Mad Dog again at an independent wrestling event held at the Tryon Mall in Charlotte, North Carolina.

==== American Championship Wrestling (1996–1997) ====
Between 1996 and 1997, Bragg performed for American Championship Wrestling (ACW) where he became the ACW United States Champion.

On June 1, 1996, ACW had a TV taping at Manning Junior High School in Manning, South Carolina. Bragg, teaming with Johnny Red Cloud defeated Ethan Storm and Les Parker. During that same event, Bragg also defeated Chaz Rocco by disqualification in an ACW United States Championship title match.

On September 21, 1996, Bragg performed in taped matches for ACW at Candor Elementary School in Candor, North Carolina. Bragg defeated Wolverine, High Voltage defeats Bragg and Bragg goes to a double count out against Chief Red Thunder.

On January 18, 1997, Bragg goes to a double count out against Johnny Red Cloud at an ACW event in Sylvia, North Carolina.

==== National Championship Wrestling (1997) ====
In 1997, Bragg defeated Mike Hart by disqualification at a National Championship Wrestling (NCW) event at Bailey's Nightlife Club in Sylva, North Carolina on March 6 and Rusty Riddle defeated Bragg, also at an NCW event at Bailey's Nightlife Club on September 4.

Bragg performed at an independent wrestling show in Forest City, North Carolina, on April 11, 1998. Bragg, in a losing effort participated in a battle royal against Gene Davis, Grunge Master, Hunter Thompson, Jake Steele, James Fulton, Kevin Kirby, Pat Rukus, Ringmaster and Jeff Hamrick, who won the match.

Some time before March 1999, Bragg along with Wahoo McDaniel trained aspiring professional wrestler John E. Stone.

==== National Wrestling Alliance Wildside (1999–2000) ====
Between 1999 and 2000, Bragg performed in matches for National Wrestling Alliance (NWA) Wildside at the NWA Arena in Cornelia, Georgia.

In 1999, Bragg defeated TJ Gray on September 18 and on October 9 during a NWA Wildside TV taping.

On August 19, 2000, Bragg teaming with Johnny Eagle in a losing effort participated in Round No. 1 of a NWA Wildside Tag Team Championship title tournament handicap mega Royal Rumble match. The other participants were; White Trash, Ben Thrasher, Ron Star, Danny Whitbrow, Johnny Blast, Spyder Crowley and Scottie Wrenn, who won the match without a tag team partner.

==== Exodus Wrestling Alliance (2005) ====
Bragg defeated Greg "The Hammer" Valentine in a strap match on February 19, 2005, while performing for Exodus Wrestling Alliance (EWA).

On October 4, 2005, Bragg defeated Mark Slain at the EWA event The War Dance Never Dies: A Tribute to Wahoo McDaniel. The event took place at the National Guard Armory in Mooresville, North Carolina and was to pay tribute to professional wrestler and promoter Wahoo McDaniel who died on April 18, 2002.

==== Hurricane Katrina Benefit Show (2005) ====
On September 25, 2005, Bragg teamed with EZ Money to defeat Mark Slain and Dookie Payne at a 2005 Hurricane Katrina benefit show in Westminster, South Carolina. Nine professional wrestling promotions, including Bragg's American Pro Wrestling, and 125 professional wrestlers participated in the event.

==== New Millennium Championship Wrestling (2005) ====
Bragg defeated Doug Hawkins on September 30, 2005, while performing for New Millennium Championship Wrestling (NMCW).

==== Carolina Championship Wrestling (2005) ====
On October 8, 2005, Bragg was defeated by Greg "The Hammer" Valentine while performing for Carolina Championship Wrestling (CCW).

Bragg wrestled and lost against Greg "The Hammer" Valentine in a dog collar match at the November 19, 2005, Carolina Championship Wrestling Tribute to Starrcade event. The event took place at the Memorial Auditorium in Spartanburg, South Carolina.

==== Carolina Wrestling Alliance (2006) ====
On December 1, 2006, Bragg defeated Blackjack Dalton while performing for Carolina Wrestling Alliance (CWA).

=== American Pro Wrestling (1997–2009, 2017–2020) ===
Bragg was the owner and promoter of American Pro Wrestling (APW), a company he started in 1997. Bragg also owns the American Coliseum in Spartanburg, South Carolina, the venue where Bragg primarily hosts APW events.

In 2005, Bragg defeated DL Kool in Spartanburg, South Carolina, on March 5. Bragg teamed with Deacon Donnie defeated Rev. Slim and James McHone in Spartanburg, South Carolina, on September 10, Bragg defeated A.J. Frost in Spartanburg, South Carolina, on September 17, DL Kool and Ken Magnum with James McHone defeated Bragg teamed with Johnny Eagle on September 23.

Bragg defeated Zack Salvation on August 12, 2006.

On March 10, 2007, Bragg defeated Cruiser Lewis in Spartanburg, South Carolina.

Bragg, teaming with Jesse Blood and Dusty Money defeat Ike Stevens, Jake Jeckel and Ostgard on May 3, 2008.

Bragg is also credited for training DeAndre Jackson who started his wrestling career in 2012.

=== January Smackdown ===
Every 3 years, Bragg trains 30 students to put on a wrestling show in an interim class called "January Smackdown: A Cultural History of Professional Wrestling" for Wofford College. Bragg was awarded the title Doctor of Pro Wrestling by Wofford College.

=== Tarheel Championship Wrestling (2022) ===
As of 2022, Eagle still wrestles for the promotion at 69 years old based in North Carolina.

== Personal life ==
Bragg graduated in 1972 from Boiling Springs High School in Boiling Springs, South Carolina. After high school Bragg went to work as a roofer.

Bragg was married to Rhonda she has since divorced him and remarried. He had 5 children. Rhonda worked as a valet and an announcer. Bragg's son Jeremy followed in his father's footsteps and also pursued a career in professional wrestling, performing as Dusty Money. Bragg's daughter Amanda Martin helped him by working behind the counter for APW. Bragg's youngest son is Dustin Bragg AKA Dusty Money.

Bragg's oldest child, his daughter Brandy Bragg died at the age of 22 in a traffic collision on September 19, 1997. A drunk driver who had 3 previous drunk driving convictions crashed his rollback wrecker into Brandy Bragg's Geo Metro killing her. The drunk driver was sentenced to 25 years in prison, the maximum penalty.

Bragg's religious views are Christian.

Bragg owns a gym and a roofing company called Bragg Roofing.

Over the course of his wrestling career Bragg has had many injuries including; broken fingers, ribs, nose and a ruptured Achilles tendon that kept him out of wrestling for 10 months. After having surgery to repair herniated discs in his back doctors advised Bragg to discontinue wrestling, however Bragg continued wrestling regularly against their advice.

== Championships and accomplishments ==
- American Championship Wrestling
  - ACW United States Championship (1 time)
