= Evan Golden (wrestler) =

American professional wrestler

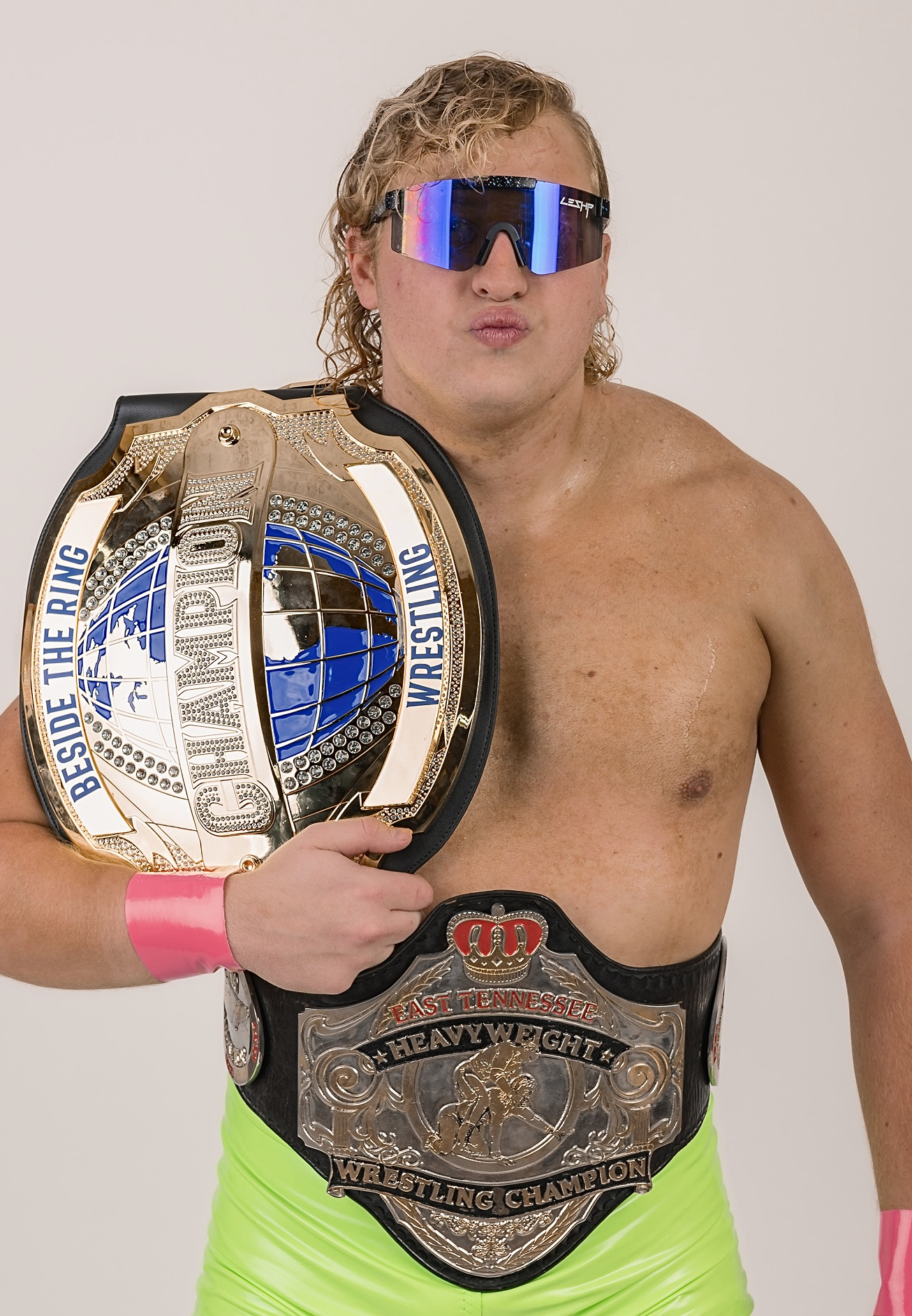

Personal information
- Born: Robert Evan Lee Cox; September 29, 2000 (age 26) Asheville, North Carolina, U.S.
- Parent: Eddie Golden (father)

Professional wrestling career
- Ring name: Evan Golden
- Billed height: 6 ft 2 in (188 cm)
- Billed weight: 209 lb (95 kg)
- Billed from: Asheville, North Carolina
- Trained by: Eddie Golden; E. Z. Money
- Debut: December 18, 2021

Robert Evan Lee Cox (born September 29, 2000), better known by the ring name Evan Golden, is an American professional wrestler. A second generation wrestler, he is the son of Eddie Golden and the third member of the Golden wrestling family.

== Early life ==
Robert Evan Lee Cox was born on September 29, 2000, in Asheville, North Carolina. His father, Eddie, worked as a professional wrestler, touring the Southeast. Cox participated in gymnastics and competitive swimming, receiving coaching from former Olympic medalist Mary Montgomery. Cox attended Asheville-Buncombe Technical Community College where he graduated a member of the National Society of Leadership and Success and the International Thespian Society.

== Professional wrestling career ==
=== Early career (2021–2022) ===
Golden debuted on December 18, 2021, for the Asheville-based promotion Uprise Pro Wrestling, accompanied to the ring by his father, Eddie. Golden was provided training from his dad alongside E.Z. Money.

=== National Wrestling Alliance (2023–present) ===
Early appearances (2023–2024)

Golden unsuccessfully challenged Kerry Morton for the NWA World Junior Heavyweight Championship in Mountain City, Tennessee on May 17, 2023. Immediately after the match, Golden tagged alongside Jeff Paul against Morton and Bryan Montgomery in an impromptu tag team match.

Golden competed at SOM Live and the National Wrestling Alliance's Monsters of the Midway event on July 28, 2023. Golden retained the SOM Hybrid Championship against Victor Andrews, Blade Gibson, and Jackson Black. Golden retained the championship in a defense against Kirk Cazana on August 8, 2023.

Southeastern territories (2024–present)

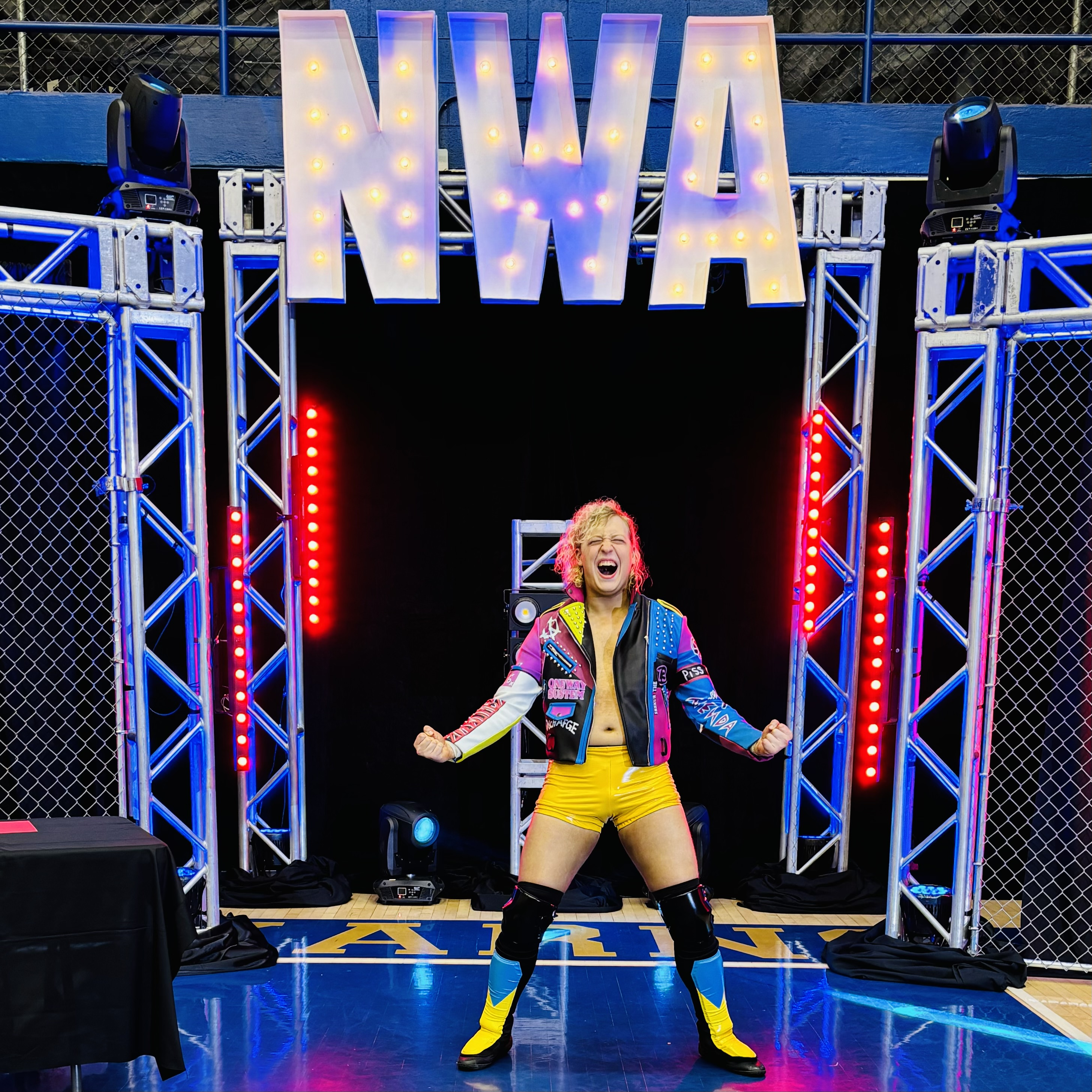
Golden performing at NWA Back to the Territories in 2024

On February 9, 2024, Golden debuted for National Wrestling Alliance Joe Cazana Promotions Southeast, the first official southeastern territory for the NWA. Golden teamed alongside Michael Gabriel as The Guiding Light in a losing effort to The Country Gentlemen, AJ and KC Cazana.

Golden and Gabriel returned to NWA-JCP on May 10, 2024, at Showdown at Sunbright, revealing Sal Rinauro as their new manager. The Guiding Light, now accompanied by Rinauro, faced Gustavo and JeMiale. Golden and Gabriel emerged victorious after Golden blinded JeMiale with an eyerake, allowing Rinauro to burn JeMiale with a fireball from the Book of Gabriel. After stealing the victory, Golden and Gabriel remained at ringside for Rinauro's match with Tyler Shoop. Golden attempted to use the Book of Gabriel fireball on Shoop, but the fire did not take shape, allowing Shoop to throw Rinauro into the book and execute a schoolboy pin. After the loss for Rinauro, a tense argument ensued before Golden and Rinauro made up.

On June 1, 2024, Golden competed at the NWA Back to the Territories tapings of Powerrr, where he was defeated by Wayne Moxxi with a springboard elbow drop. On June 14, Golden and Gabriel challenged The Zenith (JR Miller and TDT) to a match at NWA-JCP Showcase Series: Back to the Basics in Decatur, Tennessee. Golden and Gabriel lost the match after Gabriel failed his attempt to cheat. On August 29, The Guiding Light debuted for the fourth official territory, NWA Kross Fire. At the event, JaMiale recruited Rabbit Rogue and challenged Golden and Gabriel to a tag team match in response to the fireball incident. Golden and Gabriel emerged unsuccessful after a double roll up.

Golden entered the Carson Drake Invitational Battle Royal at NWA-JCP Matinee at the Matches on September 29, 2024. Despite an endorsement from Drake, Golden was eliminated from the match by Karl Parker. After pulling Parker off the apron to eliminate him, the two fought around the venue, igniting a new rivalry. In the main event of the show, Golden was defeated by Parker and KC Cazana in a no holds barred triple threat match.

On May 24, 2025, Golden entered a tag team gauntlet match at NWA Kross Fire Independent Uprising XIX, teaming with Austin Lane. Golden and Lane successfully reigned over The Coven before fighting off with Mystic Maulers, eliminating themselves from the gauntlet. The following night, Golden competed at NWA-JCP Beer Market Brawl in Knoxville, teaming with Michael Gabriel against Magic Jake Dumas and Rabbit Rogue. Golden and Gabriel were defeated after Rogue submitted Golden. On August 28, Golden competed in a four-way elimination match against Rabbit Rogue, JeMiale, and Logan Grove at night one of NWA Kross Fire's fairground event in Sevierville, Tennessee. In the match, Golden pinned Rabbit Rogue before being eliminated from the match by JeMiale, who emerged victorious. On night two, Golden teamed alongside Big Booty Judy, defeating Kohnor Martin and Nikki Wilde in a mixed tag team match.

At NWA Kross Fire Locked N’ Loaded on January 16, 2026, Golden and Austin Lane accepted an open challenge from Ronaldo Perez and Jamesen Shook, with Jaden Newman at ringside. Golden and Lane lost to Perez and Shook in a steel cage match. On September 2, 2026, Golden competed in a seven-man gauntlet match at NWA Kross Fire Sevier County Fair night one, which he lost. The following night, he was defeated by Kohnor Martin at NWA Kross Fire’s Sevier County Fair night two event.

== Professional wrestling style, persona, and reception ==
Golden utilizes the somersault neckbreaker as his finisher, known as the Afterburner. Golden inherited the finisher from his trainer E.Z. Money, who innovated the move in ECW and WCW. Golden occasionally employs a diving neckbreaker variation of the move called the Super Afterburner. Golden also inherited the Pendulum of Pain from Money, a rocking horse Boston crab.

Golden uses a variety of other signature moves such as a reverse piledriver hold transitioned into an inverted double underhook facebuster called Gold Rush. He also employs a back-to-belly piledriver called the Golden Ticket. Golden performs a variety of different moonsault variations, notably the top rope moonsault and the standing moonsault.

Golden has donned a flamboyant vogue since the beginning of his career, popularizing concepts such as illuminating jackets and body glitter. Golden has received acclaim for his work as a heel, often instigating fans and provoking spectators at ringside. Golden has utilized his promo abilities to host his own talk show, 24 Karat Gold, using the platform to initiate matches and trash talk.

== Music career ==
On March 19, 2020, Golden debuted his first single as a musician on streaming platforms. Golden released the following single, "Walk", a year later. Golden released his third single titled "Jet Lag" in collaboration with MecHeoN on May 28. Golden released his fourth single titled "Huntin' for Myself" alongside James Tate on July 10, 2021.

== Filmography ==
=== Film ===
Year	Title	Role	Notes
2025	Tropicmania	Steve Skyfire	Also director, composer
TBA	Shiners	TBA	

=== Video games ===
Year	Title	Notes	Ref.
2023	GM Universe	Video game debut	

== Discography ==
=== Singles ===
==== As lead artist ====
List of singles as a lead artist, showing year released and album name
Title	Year	Album
"Up Now / Vapor" (featuring James Tate)	2020	Non-album singles
"Walk"	2021	Non-album singles
"Jet Lag" (featuring MecHeoN)	2021	Non-album singles
"Huntin' for Myself" (featuring James Tate)	2021	Non-album singles
"Keep Asking"	2021	Non-album singles
"Mad"	2021	Non-album singles
"Ride"	2021	Non-album singles
"Chasing You"	2021	Non-album singles
"Watching"	2021	Non-album singles
"Snowstorm"	2021	Non-album singles
"Love Again"	2022	Non-album singles
"Man of the Year" (featuring MecHeoN)	2022	Non-album singles
"It's Christmas Time Again"	2022	Non-album singles
"Dreams" (featuring James Tate)	2023	Non-album singles
"Homesick"	2023	Non-album singles
”Deeper”	2024	Non-album singles
"Ghost Town"	2024	Non-album singles
“Fame”	2024	Non-album singles
"Ocean Eyes"	2025	Non-album singles

== Championships and accomplishments ==
- All Star Entertainment
  - ASE Heavyweight Championship (1 time)
- American Pro Wrestling
  - APW Tag Team Championship (1 time) – with Michael Gabriel
- Beside The Ring Wrestling
  - BTR Championship (1 time, current, inaugural)
- Dixie Championship Wrestling
  - Rocky Top Heavyweight Championship (1 time)
- Elevate Pro Wrestling
  - EPW Next Level Championship (1 time)
- Heritage Wrestling Alliance
  - HWA Mid-Atlantic Heavyweight Championship (1 time)
- Intense Championship Wrestling Asylum
  - ICWA Royal Crown Championship (1 time)
- Independent Wrestling Xperience
  - IWX ranked Evan Golden # 336 of the 1,000 best independent wrestlers in the United States in 2025
- New World Wrestling
  - NWW Heavyweight Championship (1 time, current)
- SOM Live / Smoky Mountain Pro
  - SOM Hybrid Championship (1 time)
  - SOM East Tennessee Heavyweight Championship (2 times)
  - SOM East Tennessee Tag Team Championship (3 times) – with KC Cazana, Michael Gabriel and Eddie Golden
  - SOM Bunkhouse Stampede (2025)
  - SOM Awards (2 times)
    - Breakout Star of the Year (2023)
    - Most Hated (2024)
- Southern Pride Championship Wrestling
  - SPCW Junior Heavyweight Championship (1 time)
- United Wrestling Syndicate
  - UWS World Championship (1 time)
- Wrestling 4 A Cause
  - W4AC 24/7 Hero Championship (2 times)
  - W4AC United States Championship (1 time)
