= E. Z. Money =

American professional wrestler (born 1973)

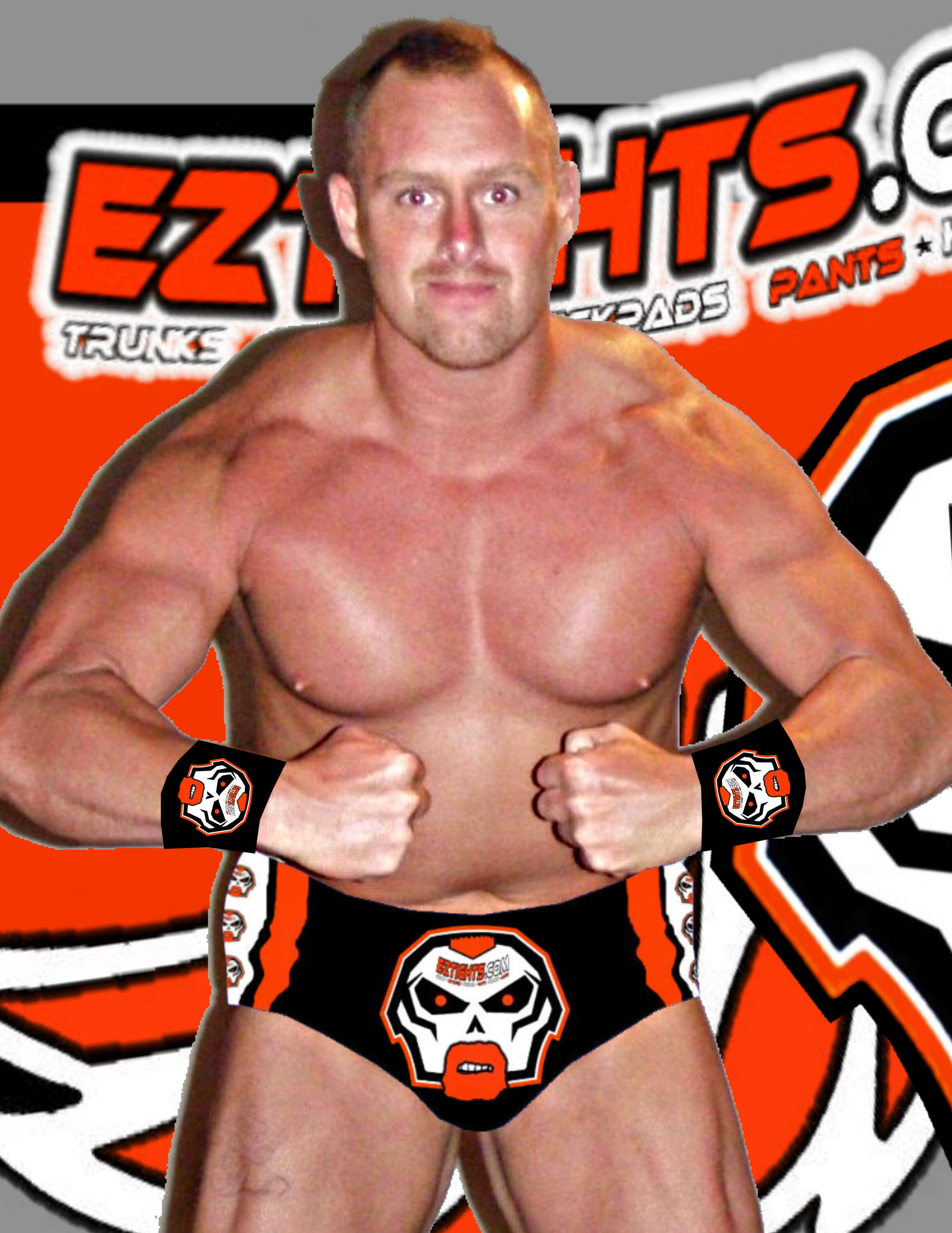
- Broyles in 2014

Personal information
- Born: Jason Broyles; April 27, 1973 (age 53) Atlantic City, New Jersey, U.S.

Professional wrestling career
- Ring name(s): E. Z. Money; Jason B Jason Jett; Skyfire; Steve Skyfire
- Billed height: 6 ft 2 in (188 cm)
- Billed weight: 239 lb (108 kg)
- Billed from: Atlantic City, New Jersey
- Debut: 1990

Jason Broyles (born April 27, 1973) is an American professional wrestler. He is best known for his tenure in Extreme Championship Wrestling (ECW) under the ring name E. Z. Money. He also briefly wrestled for World Championship Wrestling (WCW) in 2001 under the ring name Jason Jett.

== Professional wrestling career ==
=== Early career (1990–2000) ===
Broyles made his professional wrestling debut in 1990 after training himself. In 1994 he worked for Jim Cornette's Smoky Mountain Wrestling, he was known as Steve Skyfire and was mainly used as a jobber.

=== Extreme Championship Wrestling (2000–2001) ===
After working on the independent circuit for ten years, he made his Extreme Championship Wrestling debut on June 2, 2000 under the ring name Steve Skyfire in a losing effort to Chilly Willy. Eight days later, Broyles made his televised debut for ECW as E. Z. Money in a losing effort to Kid Kash. After wrestling in singles matches to mixed results over the next few weeks, Money formed an alliance with Chris Hamrick. After Hamrick helped Money defeat Julio Fantastico, with whom he had a brief feud, Fantastico joined Money and Hamrick after being unable to defeat them. Fantastico then renamed himself Julio Dinero and the stable became known as Hot Commodity. Hot Commodity was rather unsuccessful, however, as they only won two matches together. Despite this, Money and Dinero were granted a title match against then-World Tag Team Champions Danny Doring and Roadkill on January 7, 2001 at ECW's final pay-per-view Guilty as Charged, which they lost. Money and Dinero received a rematch for the title five days later, but were again defeated. Hot Commodity stayed together until ECW declared bankruptcy in 2001 and was subsequently shut down.

=== World Championship Wrestling (2001) ===
After ECW declared bankruptcy, Broyles soon started working for World Championship Wrestling. He made his debut for WCW on the March 7 episode of Thunder as Jason B, where he and Scotty O lost to 3 Count (Shannon Moore and Evan Karagias) in the quarterfinals of a tournament to determine the promotion's first Cruiserweight Tag Team Champions. The following week on Thunder, Broyles was renamed to Jason Jett and defeated Alex Wright. On March 18 at WCW's final pay-per-view Greed, Jett defeated Kwee Wee. The following night on Nitro, Jett defeated Disqo. On the March 21 episode of Thunder, Jett defeated fellow ECW alumnus Cash in the latter's debut for WCW.

=== World Wrestling Federation (2001–2002) ===
Broyles remained with WCW until it was purchased by the World Wrestling Federation in late March. After his contract was picked up by the WWF, he was sent to the Heartland Wrestling Association, one of their development territories. While in the HWA, Broyles won the promotion's Heavyweight Championship twice before being released from his contract in July 2002.

=== Total Nonstop Action Wrestling and Ring of Honor (2002–2003) ===
After being released from his WWF contract, Broyles made a few appearances in Total Nonstop Action Wrestling, Ring of Honor and the Frontier Wrestling Alliance under his E. Z. Money ring name before retiring in 2003. After retiring, he began working as a tailor for wrestlers, designing attire such as boots and trunks.

=== Independent circuit (2007–2018, 2023–present) ===
On January 27, 2007, Broyles, as E. Z. Money, wrestled his first match in nearly four years as he defeated The Brother Grimm at Championship Wrestling Alliance's House Party event. On February 17, Money defeated Mathias Grimm at the CWA's Snowed The F Out event. On July 28, Money made his final appearance for the CWA as he won a four-way match against Chase Owens, Greg Rocker, and O-Dog. On October 12, 2013, Broyles, as EZ Money teamed with Eddie Golden in a losing effort to the NWA Tennessee Tag Team Champions Air America (Skylar Kruze and Gavin Daring) in a title match for NWA Smoky Mountain.

On June 14, 2014, E. Z. Money teamed with Reborn Champion Cody Ices and Anthony Brody in a losing effort against Jake "The Snake" Roberts, The Stallion and Alex Cage in the main event for Reborn Wrestling.

On September 26, 2015 E. Z. Money lost against Ethan Carter III in a match for the TNA World Heavyweight Championship. The match took place in a Pro Wrestling South card at the Sullivan North High School in Tennessee.

Money returned to the ring for the first time in five years on March 26, 2023 at New Outlaw Wrestling’s Chosen One II event as a surprise entrant in the Royal Rumble match. Money dominated the match before being eliminated by his trainee Evan Golden.

On April 6, 2024, Money teamed alongside Evan Golden and Blade Gibson to defeat Kyler Hunt, Santiago, and Zac Thomas in a six-man tag team match in Elizabethton, Tennessee. Following the match, Money was inducted into the Carter County Professional Wrestling Hall of Fame. On August 31, Money debuted at Beside the Ring Wrestling in Mountain City. Money helped Evan Golden win the BTR Championship by interfering in the match and hitting RT3 with the Crash Landing, securing the victory for Golden. On October 5, Money and Golden, teaming as Zero Gravity, defeated RT3 and Santiago in a special attraction tag team match at All Star Entertainment in Duffield, Virginia. On November 16, 2024, Money and Golden teamed as a new incarnation of Hot Commodity at Innovate Wrestling’s A Night Grudges, defeating Ryan Austin and Christian Roberts.

On November 23, 2024, Money returned to Beside the Ring, defeating the Happy Valley Ninja Warrior in Elizabethton, Tennessee. Later in the main event, Money accompanied Evan Golden in his match against Heath Slater for the Beside the Ring Championship, with Money contractually obligated to be handcuffed at ringside. Money broke free to blind special enforcer Buff Bagwell, allowing Golden to use brass knuckles to defeat Slater.

== Professional wrestling style and persona ==
Broyles' most well-known character was "E. Z. Money", which was notable for his stint as a member of Hot Commodity in ECW. He used Cha-Ching as his finishing move and a wide range of signature moves which included a swinging cradle suplex followed by a powerbomb called Electric Dreams, an E. Z. Driver, an inverted crucifix powerbomb, a moonsault, a reverse piledriver hold transitioned into an inverted double underhook facebuster called Money Bag, a slingshot somersault clothesline and the Money in the Bank. He used "For the Love of Money" / "Down on Me" mix by The O'Jays and Jackyl and "Down on Me" by Jackyl as his entrance theme song in ECW and ROH.

He also used a character called "Jason Jett" during his brief WCW stint in the final days of WCW. In WCW, he used Crash Landing as his finishing move.

== Championships and accomplishments ==
- Heartland Wrestling Association
  - HWA Heavyweight Championship (2 times)
- National Wrestling League
  - NWL Tag Team Championship (1 time) - with Big Easy & Cory Bush
- Pro Wrestling Illustrated
  - PWI ranked him #164 of the 500 best singles wrestlers in the PWI 500 in 2002
- Southern States Wrestling
  - SSW Heavyweight Championship (1 time)
