= Tennessee State Route 159 =

State highway in Tennessee, United States

State Route 159

Route information
- Maintained by TDOT
- Length: 12.5 mi (20.1 km)

Major junctions
- West end: US 321 / SR 67 in Fish Springs
- East end: US 321 at the North Carolina state line in Johnson County

Location
- Country: United States
- State: Tennessee
- Counties: Carter, Johnson

Highway system
- Tennessee State Routes; Interstate; US; State
← SR 158	→ SR 160

State Route 159 (SR 159) is a west to east highway in the U.S. state of Tennessee that is 12 miles (19 km) long. It begins in Carter County at SR 67 and ends in Johnson County at the North Carolina state line. State Route 159 is little-known by the general public by this designation as it is overlain by U.S. Route 321 (US 321); the "159" designation is seen on mileposts.

== Route description ==
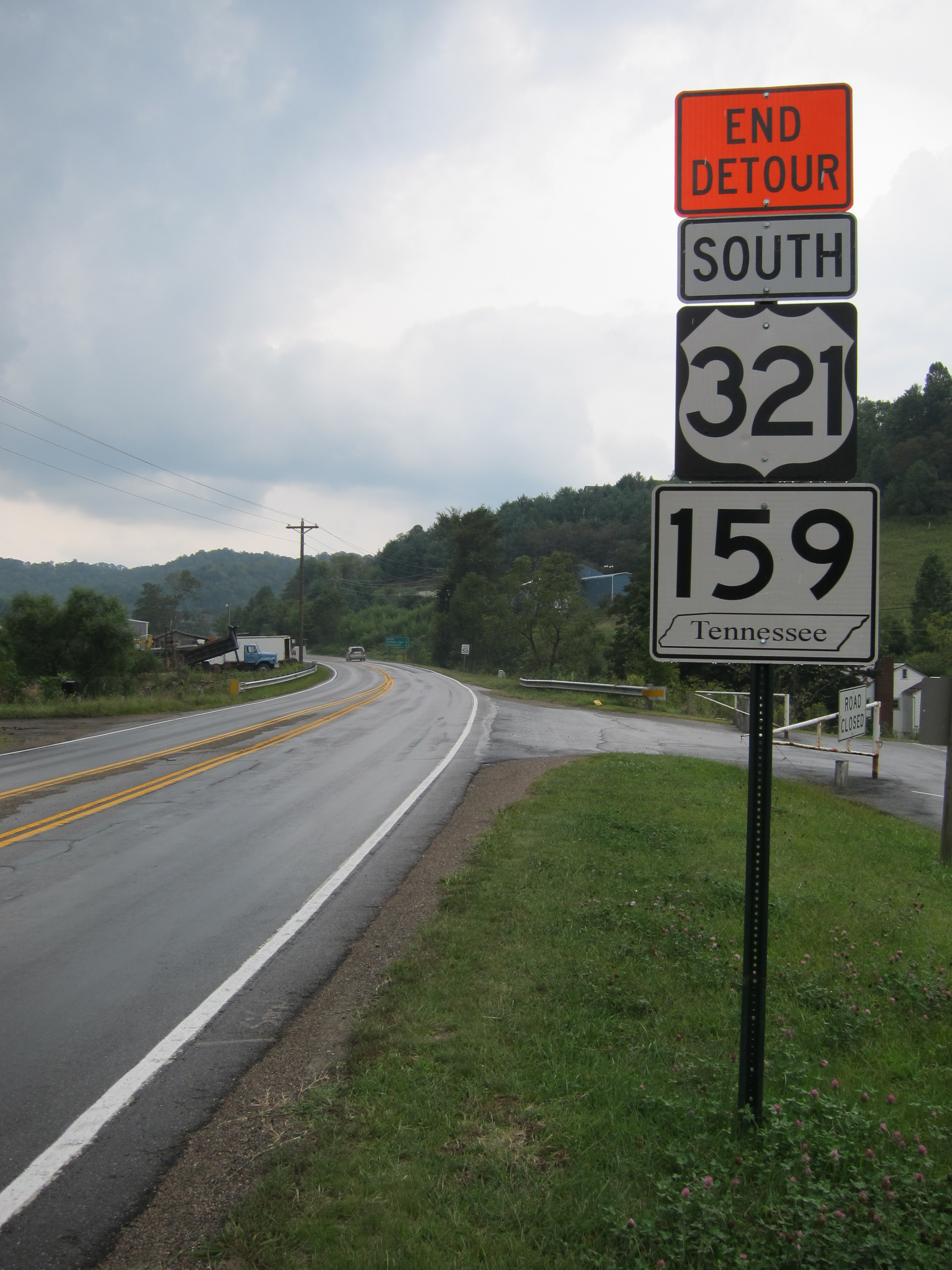
US 321/SR 159 in Vilas, NC

SR 159, overlain by US 321, traverses 12.5 miles (20.1 km) along the banks of Watauga Lake. It is a curvy two-lane mountain highway.

== History ==
In 2011–12, a bridge replacement project closed a section of the highway at the Elk River; a detour route was signed using both US 321 and SR 159, along SR 67 and US 421 in Tennessee to Vilas, North Carolina, where it ended. This was the only time SR 159 has ever been signed during its entire existence.

== Junction list ==
County	Location	mi	km	Destinations	Notes
Carter	Fish Springs	0.0	0.0	US 321 north / SR 67 – Elizabethton, Mountain City	Western terminus
Johnson		12.5	20.1	US 321 south – Boone	North Carolina state line; eastern terminus
1.000 mi = 1.609 km; 1.000 km = 0.621 mi
