= Doeville, Tennessee =

Unincorporated community in Tennessee, US

Coordinates: 36°23′22″N 81°58′11″W

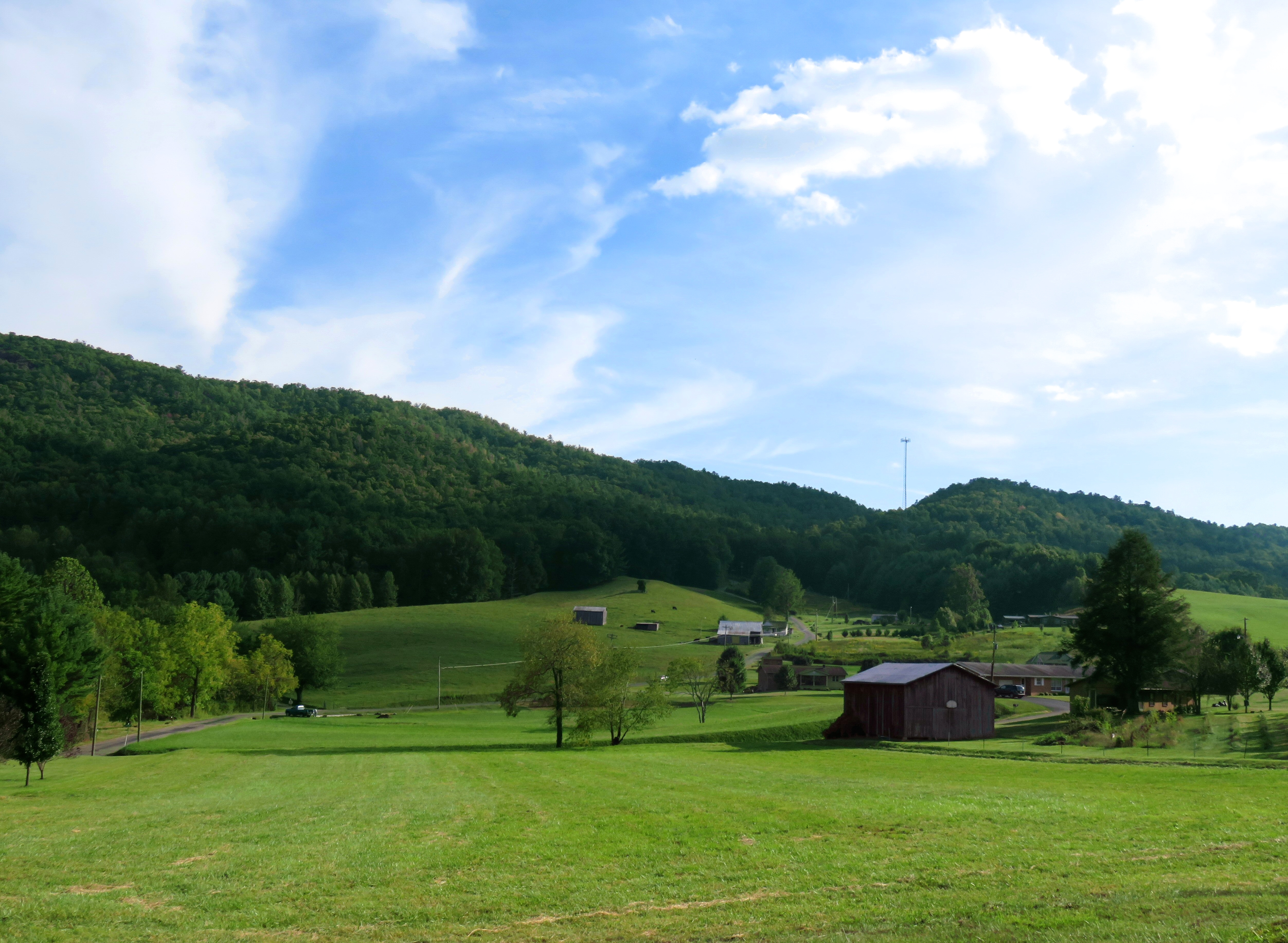
Houses in Doeville

Doeville is an unincorporated community in Johnson County, Tennessee. It is concentrated around the intersection of Tennessee State Route 67 and Tennessee State Route 167, west of Mountain City and east of Butler. The community of Pandora lies immediately to the northeast along S.R. 67.

Doeville is situated in the lower Doe Creek Valley, near the stream's confluence with Roan Creek at the headwaters of Watauga Lake. It is surrounded by mountains on all sides, namely Sink Mountain to the south, Doe Mountain to the east, and the Iron Mountains to the north and west. The Johnson County Airport is located nearby.

== Recreation ==
The community is located within 20 minutes from TVA's Watauga Lake and several TVA and Cherokee National Forest recreation areas. Watauga Lake's Sink Mountain Boat Ramp and several lakeside campgrounds are located just south of Doeville.

== Community services ==
The Doe Valley Volunteer Fire Department provides fire protection, while Johnson County Sheriff's Department provides police services.
