= Tennessee State Route 67 =

Highway in Tennessee

State Route 67
- SR 67; primary in red, secondary in blue

Route information
- Maintained by TDOT
- Length: 63.88 mi (102.80 km)
- Existed: October 1, 1923–present

Major junctions
- West end: SR 81 in Lamar
- US 321 / SR 381 in Johnson City; I-26 / US 23 / US 19W in Johnson City; US 19E / SR 91 in Elizabethton; US 19E in Hampton; US 321 near Butler; US 421 / SR 418 in Mountain City
- East end: NC 88 at the North Carolina State Line near Trade

Location
- Country: United States
- State: Tennessee
- Counties: Washington, Carter, Johnson

Highway system
- Tennessee State Routes; Interstate; US; State
← SR 66	→ SR 68

State Route 67 (SR 67) is a state-maintained highway in northeastern Tennessee, including a four-lane divided highway segments in both Washington County and Carter County, and part of a significant two-lane segment passing over the Butler Bridge some 80 feet (24 m) above the TVA Watauga Reservoir (also referred locally to as Watauga Lake) near Butler in Johnson County, Tennessee.

== Route description ==
=== Washington County ===
SR 67 begins as Cherokee Road as a 2-lane secondary highway in Washington County in Lamar at an intersection with SR 81. The highway goes to pass through the community before leaving Lamar and continuing east through rural areas before entering Johnson City. SR 67 then passes through a couple of neighborhoods before coming to an intersection with US 321 and SR 381 (University Parkway), where SR 67 becomes concurrent with US 321 and becomes a primary highway. They then travel east as a 4-lane divided highway through the south side of the city to an interchange with I-26/US 23/US 19W (Exit 24), where the highway becomes a freeway and has an interchange with Milligan Highway/Legion Street before crossing into Carter County and immediately entering Elizabethton.

=== Carter County ===
US 321/SR 67 gains some modest elevation before finally rolling over a significant slope and finally arriving at cautioned marked sloped curve just before the freeway segment ends at an at-grade intersection with SR 359 (Milligan Highway).

==== Elizabethton ====
At the SR 359/Milligan Highway exit, US 321/SR 67 continues on into Elizabethton as Elk Avenue on a 4-lane undived highway through commercial areas, where they become concurrent with SR 91 (Elizabethton Highway) and have an intersection with SR 362 (Gap Creek Road). US 321/SR 67/SR 91 then parallels the Watauga River before passing by a reconstructed interpretation of Fort Watauga at Sycamore Shoals State Park. The highway then passes through more commercial areas before entering downtown, where it becomes Broad Street and has an intersection with SR 400 before crossing the Doe River along the historic Broad Street Bridge and coming to an intersection with US 19E/SR 37 (Highway 19E), where SR 91 splits off and goes north along US 19E/SR 37 while US 321/SR 67 turns south along US 19E/SR 37.

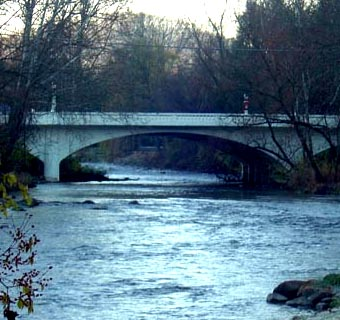
The concrete arch Broad Street Bridge.

Further on south, the four-laned highway crosses over the Doe River for a second time and then runs closely parallel with it. US 19E/US 321/SR 37/SR 67 starts gaining some gradual elevation and eventually crosses a series of bridges over the Doe River at the Valley Forge community just outside of the Elizabethton city limits (a left turn off SR 67 and onto Beck Moutanin Road after the first bridge is an alternative route to both the TVA Watauga Dam and the TVA Wilbur Dam).

SR 67 completes a final fourth and curving high double bridge crossing before arriving at Hampton.

==== Hampton ====
At Hampton, SR 67 and US 321 split off from the US 19E/SR 37 concurrency and continue eastward. Here, the road begins as a two-lane segment, briefly passing by commercial areas in Hampton (including a U.S. post office, a Dollar General store, and a non-attended public vehicle parking area for Appalachian Trail hikers arriving or entering the "AT" at Hampton), and then exiting Hampton over a high ridge.

==== Watauga Lake ====
Upon leaving Hampton, US 321/SR 67 again continually increases in elevation and roughly runs for several miles parallel to the shoreline of the massive Watauga Lake, through the Cherokee National Forest. Watauga Dam can be seen in the distance across the reservoir at the Rat Branch Boat Launch. At Fish Springs, SR 67 splits off from US 321, which heads east along SR 159, and veers northeastward, crossing Watauga Lake at the 80-foot (24 m) high Butler Bridge before entering Johnson County and Butler.

=== Johnson County ===
SR 67 passes through Butler before continuing northeastward up the Doe Creek Valley, where it passes through the communities of Doeville, Pandora, Doe Valley, and Dewey. During this stretch it passes by the Northeast Correctional Complex. At Doeville, it junctions with SR 167, which continues southeastward up the Roan Creek Valley to emerge in the Shouns Crossroads area of southern Mountain City. SR 67 then comes to an intersection with US 421/SR 34/SR 418, where SR 67 turns south and becomes concurrent with US 421/SR 34. They then bypass downtown to the west side, where they have an intersection with SR 418 before going through a commercial area as 4-lane undivided highway, where they a second intersection with SR 167 at Shouns Crossroads, before leaving Mountain City and continuing south, narrowing to 2-lanes. US 421/SR 34/SR 67 then pass through some rugged mountainous terrain before entering Trade, where SR 67 splits off from US 421/SR 34, becoming a secondary highway and heading eastward up the Jenkins Creek Valley toward North Carolina. At the state line, the roadway becomes North Carolina Highway 88 (NC 88).

== History ==
In 1988, a stretch of State Route 67 was completed between Johnson City and Elizabethton as part of Quad-Cities Beltway projects. The highway follows Cherokee Road through most of Johnson City before merging with US 321 (University Parkway) near East Tennessee State University, and continuing eastward.

In Elizbethton, SR 67 passes by a reconstructed interpretation of Fort Watauga at Sycamore Shoals State Park (the historical site of both the 1775 Transylvania Purchase and also the later staging area of the Overmountain Men, who crossed the mountains and defeated British Loyalists in South Carolina during the 1780 Battle of Kings Mountain)

== Junction list ==
County	Location	mi	km	Destinations	Notes
Washington	Lamar	0.0	0.0	SR 81 – Jonesborough, Embreeville, Erwin	Western terminus; SR 67 begins as a secondary highway
Washington	Johnson City			US 321 south / SR 381 north (University Parkway)	Western end of US 321 concurrency; southern terminus of SR 381; SR 67 becomes a primary highway
Washington	Johnson City			I-26 / US 19W / US 23 – Kingsport, Erwin, Asheville	I-26 exit 24
Washington	Johnson City			Milligan Highway / Legion Street – Milligan College	Interchange
Carter	Elizabethton			SR 359 south (Milligan Highway) – Milligan College	Northern terminus of SR 359
Carter	Elizabethton			SR 91 south (Elizabethton Highway)	Western end of SR 91 concurrency
Carter	Elizabethton			SR 362 south (Mary Patton Highway)	Northern terminus of SR 362
Carter	Elizabethton			SR 400 south (N Lynn Avenue) – Watauga, Bluff City	Northern terminus of SR 400
Carter	Elizabethton			Broad Street Bridge over the Doe River	
Carter	Elizabethton			US 19E north / SR 91 north (Veterans Memorial Parkway/SR 37) – Bluff City, Roan Mountain, Mountain City, Hunter, Shady Valley	Western end of US 19E/SR 37; eastern end of SR 91 concurrency
Carter	Elizabethton			4 bridges over the Doe River	
Carter	Hampton			US 19E south (SR 37) – Roan Mountain, Elk Park, Newland	Eastern end of US 19E/SR 37 overlap
Carter	Fish Springs			US 321 east (SR 159 east) – Boone, North Carolina	Eastern end of US 321 concurrency; western terminus of SR 159
Carter	Fish Springs			Butler Memorial Bridge over Watauga Lake	
Johnson	Doeville			SR 167 north (Doe Creek Road) – Johnson County Airport	Western terminus of SR 167
Johnson	Mountain City			US 421 north (Shady Street/SR 34) / SR 418 south (West Main Street) – Bristol, Trade, Downtown Mountain City	Western end of US 421/SR 34 concurrency; Northern terminus of SR 418
Johnson	Mountain City			SR 418 north (South Church Street) – Downtown Mountain City	Southern terminus of SR 418
Johnson	Mountain City			SR 167 (Roan Creek Road/Forge Creek Road) – Johnson County Airport, Doeville, Fig	
Johnson	Trade			US 421 south (SR 34) – Boone, North Carolina	Eastern end of US 421/SR 34 concurrency; SR 67 turns secondary
Johnson		63.88	102.80	NC 88 east	Eastern terminus; North Carolina state line; SR 67 ends as a secondary highway
1.000 mi = 1.609 km; 1.000 km = 0.621 mi: Concurrency terminus
