= Fish Springs, Tennessee =

Unincorporated community in Tennessee, US

Coordinates: 36°19′02″N 82°03′30″W

Fish Springs is an unincorporated community in Carter County, Tennessee. Fish Springs is located on the south shore of Watauga Lake, along US Route 321 and Tennessee State Route 67 east of Hampton.

== History ==
The name Fish Springs originated before Watauga Lake was created. It was given this name by early settlers because there was a large cavern system into which, via a relatively small opening, a part of the Watauga River flowed. Fish in the Watauga river migrated into the cavern system in the Fall. Each Spring the fish returned to the Watauga river via the opening. Local residents could easily catch an abundance of Fish as they exited the Spring (as the opening to the cavern system was called).

== Recreation ==
There are several recreational areas managed by the Cherokee National Forest in Fish Springs.

- Cardens Bluff Campground
- Shooks Branch Picnic Area and Swim Beach
- Watauga Point Recreational Area

== Fish Springs Marina ==
Fish Springs Marina and Campground offers boat rentals and sales, slip rentals and Camping. there is also the Marina Store and a Maintenance Dept.

== See also ==
- Watauga Lake
