= Sean Patrick Goble =

American serial killer

- Goble in 1995
- Born: November 1, 1966 (age 59); Asheboro, North Carolina, U.S.
- Other name: "The Interstate Killer"
- Convictions: Tennessee; First degree murder (2 counts); North Carolina; Second degree murder
- Penalty: Tennessee; Life imprisonment North Carolina; 14 years imprisonment

Details
- Victims: 4+
- Span of crimes: 1994 – 1995 (confirmed)
- Country: United States
- States: Tennessee; North Carolina; Alabama
- Date apprehended: April 13, 1995
- Imprisoned at: Northeast Correctional Complex

Sean Patrick Goble (born November 1, 1966), known as the Interstate Killer, is an American serial killer and former truck driver who kidnapped and murdered at least four women in the southern United States between 1994 and 1995. Since his arrest and conviction, authorities in ten other states have investigated him for numerous unsolved killings of women. While he was cleared in some of those cases, as of today, his true victim count remains unclear.

== Early life ==
Goble was born on November 1, 1966, in Asheboro, North Carolina, the son of Kenneth and Emma Goble. His family moved to Illinois. The first major event to happen in his life occurred at age 6, when his father raped a 10-year-old girl during a home invasion in Rockford. Young Sean was sitting in his dad's vehicle outside of the crime scene during the attack. Kenneth was charged with the crime and was sentenced to serve four to 20-years in prison. He was released after four years and moved to New Mexico, where he was charged with raping a 6-year-old in 1986. He was convicted of that crime and returned to prison, being released in 1994.

Sean Patrick Goble lived with his mother and sister in Rockford, where he attended Auburn High School. In 1984, he dropped out during his senior year and enrolled in the U.S. army. He later got married and fathered a son, and moved to North Carolina in 1988. He lived in a trailer park in Asheboro and began working as a truck driver in 1991. In April of that year, Goble reported to Greensboro police that he had been abducted by a couple driving a Ford Fiesta and held for nearly two days. However, police were not able to corroborate his story, and Goble later admitted he made it up to hide an affair. He and his wife later separated.

== Murders ==
=== Lisa Susan O'Rourke ===
Lisa Susan O'Rourke, 29, was a native of St. Louis, Missouri. In January 1994, Goble picked up O'Rourke along Interstate 10 in either Louisiana or Mississippi. He and O'Rourke had sex before he strangled her to death, dumping her body under a bridge along Interstate 65 in Alabama. Her body was found on January 23. Her death, initially ruled as hypothermia, was eventually ruled as murder. Her identity was not revealed until April of that year, via fingerprinting.

=== Brenda Kay Hagy ===
Brenda Kay Hagy, 45, was Goble's second known victim. A native of Bloomington, Indiana, Hagy had a history of criminal charges in her native state for trespassing into truck stops, areas that are hotspots for prostitution. Hagy frequently moved across the east side of the country as a vagrant. She stayed at a homeless shelter in Gainesville, Florida on January 22, 1995. The next day she voyaged to Baileyton, Tennessee, where, at a truck stop, she was abducted by Goble, who proceeded to rape and strangle her to death, breaking her neck in the process. He later drove his truck all the way to Bristol, Virginia, where he left her body along an access road to Interstate 81. He ran over her legs while in the process of driving away. The body was found the following morning by a newspaper carrier walking along I-81. An investigation was set up by police, who received numerous tips, the most promising being from a trucker who said he saw a semi parked along the same access road hours before Hagy's body was found. Goble wrote a statement on April 13, 1995, that he raped and strangled Hagy at the truck stop in Baileyton then traveled on with her body to Bristol where he then dumped the body. Goble pled guilty to murder in December 1995 in Greene County criminal court.

=== Sherry Tew Mansur ===
Sherry Tew Mansur, 34, had a history of arrests for prostitution from 1982 to 1994. She was last seen alive by friends and family on January 31, 1995, while visiting her sister in Bowie, Maryland. She later left the home with her 2 year old niece; her niece was located the following morning in Washington, DC. In Fredericksburg, Virginia, Goble picked up Mansur while driving his truck. According to Goble, the two had sex before he decided to strangle her to death. He later dumped her body along Interstate 40, where it was found on February 19. When it was found, her identity could not be conclusively proven, so for the next few months, she was only known as "Jane Doe".

=== Alice Rebecca Hanes ===
Alice Rebecca Hanes, 36, was a native of Columbus, Ohio. She had been convicted of prostitution in the past. Her last location before her death was in Salina, Kansas, when she called from a truck stop along Interstate 70. From there, she hitchhiked to Tennessee, where Goble kidnapped her from a gas station and smothered her to death. He dumped her body along Interstate 81 in Virginia.

=== Suspected victims ===
Along with Tennessee, North Carolina and Alabama, Goble was also investigated in killings in numerous other states. A day after his arrest, he was investigated for the 1992 murder of 21-year-old Tammy Zywicki of Evesham, New Jersey. For a brief period of time, Goble was investigated as a suspect for the serial killer known as Dr. No. He was later cleared of suspicion in those cases because, in some of the earlier killings, Goble was still in high school and later the army. He was also briefly a suspect for the I-70 killer, but he was cleared of suspicion in that case due to him not matching the physical description of the killer.

Some murders that Goble was suspected of include multiple Jane Does found along highways between 1987 and 1995; the murder of Marcia Matthews in 1985; the murder of Shirly Dean Taylor in 1986; the murder of April Barnett in 1986; the murder of Anna Patterson in 1987; the murder of Kathryn Hill, aka Wendy Turner, in 1990; the murder of Cheryl Mason in 1991; the murder of Nona Cobb in 1992; and the murder of Margaret Goins in 1995. Goble was ruled out in Cobb's murder due to DNA testing, and in 2022 her death was attributed to Warren Alexander, a separate suspected serial killer.

== Arrest, convictions and status ==
During the investigation, a plastic bag left behind at Hagy's murder contained the fingerprint of her killer. When submitted into a database, investigators got a hit when it matched to a print taken from Goble in September 1994 after an arrest for multiple misdemeanors. From there he was arrested in Winston-Salem, North Carolina outside the Rocky Road Express, the trucking company he was then working for. A search warrant was issued on his truck. In it police found a pocketbook that belonged to Hanes. They also seized travel bags, pornographic magazines, and women's panties. During an interrogation, Goble confessed to both murders, and admitted that he had killed a woman in North Carolina. Authorities figured out it was the Jane Doe and he was charged in her death. When the woman was identified as Mansur, he was charged in her murder.

Goble briefly stated that the murder of Hagy was unintentional, but that was disproved by investigators. Goble pleaded guilty to killing Hagy and Hanes in Tennessee, for which he was imposed two life sentences. He was later extradited to North Carolina and pled guilty to the murder of Mansur, receiving an additional 14 years to his two life sentences. Due to these convictions, Goble would be required to serve at least 103 years to be considered for parole.

In April 1996, Goble was indicted with O'Rourke's murder by a Baldwin County jury. He was then transferred to Baldwin County Correction Center to await trial for the murder, but the charges were dropped a year later because of his current life sentences, with prosecutors deeming him "not a threat". Goble later took back his confessions, but nevertheless stayed behind bars. Goble is currently serving his sentence at Northeast Correctional Complex in Doe Valley, Tennessee.

== Media ==
Goble's killing spree is detailed in the episode The Interstate Prowler in the TV series Main Street Mysteries.

In 2003, the Discovery Channel TV show The New Detectives examined Goble in the episode titled "Blind Trust".

== See also ==
- List of serial killers in the United States
