= Tennessee State Route 167 =

State highway in Tennessee, United States

State Route 167
- SR 167 highlighted in red

Route information
- Maintained by TDOT
- Length: 21.0 mi (33.8 km)

Major junctions
- South end: SR 67 in Doeville
- US 421 / SR 67 in Mountain City
- North end: Big Laurel Road at the North Carolina state line

Location
- Country: United States
- State: Tennessee
- Counties: Johnson

Highway system
- Tennessee State Routes; Interstate; US; State
← SR 166	→ SR 168

State Route 167 (SR 167) is a state highway in Johnson County, Tennessee and a spur route of Tennessee State Route 67 (SR 67).

== Route description ==
SR 167 begins at an intersection with SR 67 in Doeville. It goes southeastward as Doe Creek Road and passes through a gap between two ridges before turning south and coming to an intersection with Lakeview Drive, where the highway skirts along the banks of Watauga Lake for a short distance. SR 167 then turns left to go northeast as Roan Creek Road and passes through some farmland before crisscrossing through some mountains. The highway then re-enters farmland and travels northeastward past Johnson County Airport. SR 167 then enters Mountain City and passes by a neighborhood before having an intersection with US 421/SR 67 (S Shady Street). SR 167 then leaves Mountain City soon after as Forge Creek Road and continues in a northeastward direction and crisscrosses through various valley and ridges for several miles before coming to its northern terminus at the North Carolina state line, where it continues as Big Laurel Road towards Fig and North Carolina Highway 88 (NC 88).

== Junction list ==
The entire route is in Johnson County.

Location	mi	km	Destinations	Notes
Doeville	0.0	0.0	SR 67 – Elizabethton, Mountain City	Southern terminus
Mountain City			US 421 / SR 67 (South Shady Street/SR 34) – Mountain City, Trade, Boone	
	21.0	33.8	Big Laurel Road	Northern terminus; Continuation beyond North Carolina state line
1.000 mi = 1.609 km; 1.000 km = 0.621 mi
