= Simerly-Butler House =

Historic house in Tennessee, United States

- U.S. National Register of Historic Places
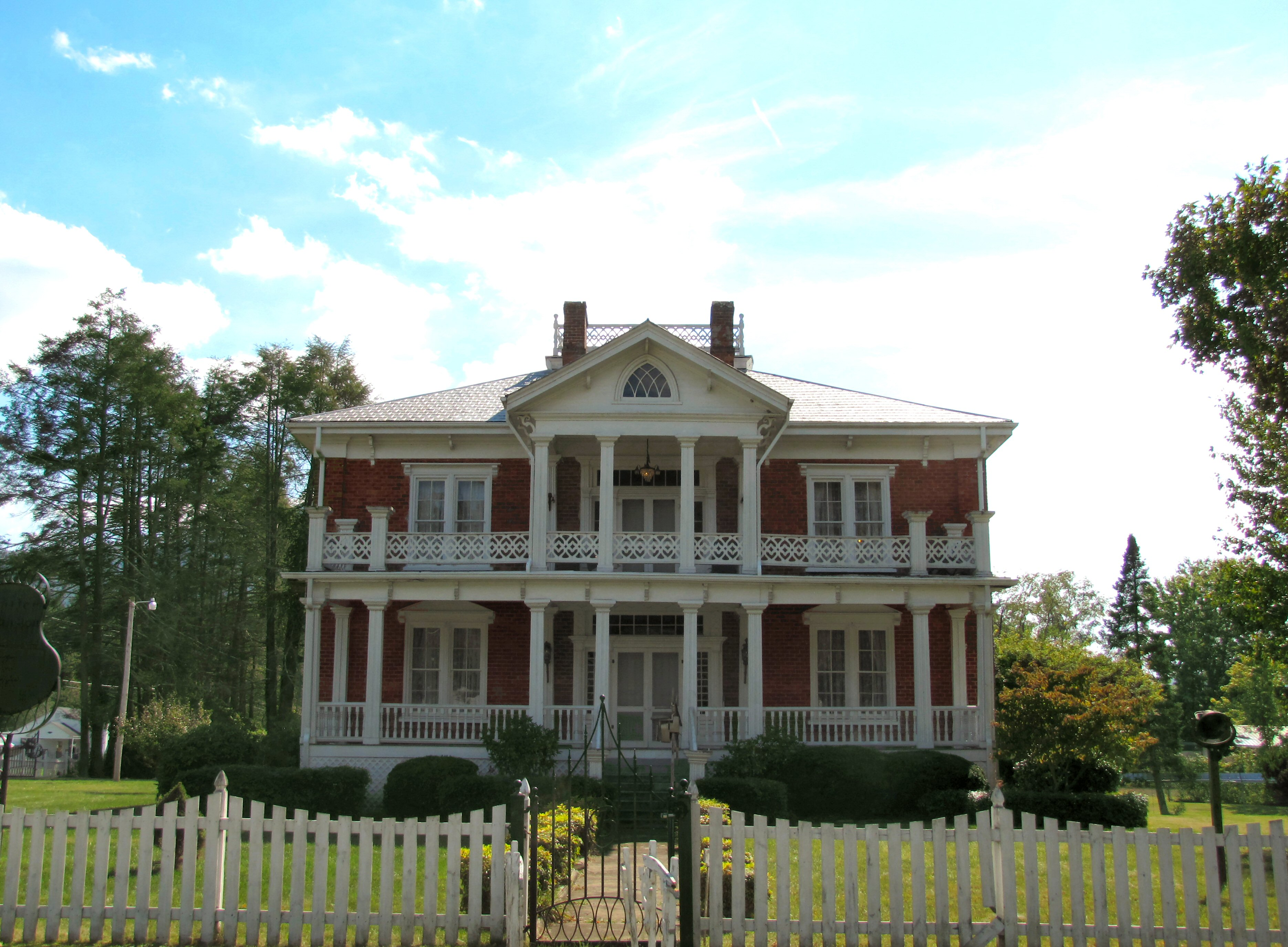
- The Simerly-Butler House in 2015

- Location within Tennessee Location within the United States
- Location: 206 Main St., Hampton, Tennessee
- Coordinates: 36°17′0″N 82°10′24″W
- Area: less than one acre
- Built: 1867
- Architectural style: Italianate
- NRHP reference No.: 96001315
- Added to NRHP: November 7, 1996

The Simerly-Butler House, also known as the Butler Mansion, is a historic mansion in Hampton, Tennessee, USA.

The house is privately owned and not open to the public.

== History ==
The mansion was completed in 1867. It was built for Elijah Simerly (1820–1891), the founder of the town of Hampton (named after his wife's maiden name) and the President of the East Tennessee and Western North Carolina Railroad from 1867 to 1871.

The house was acquired by A. H. Robinson in 1907. Three years later, in 1910, it was purchased by Nathaniel Edwin Harris, who served as the 61st Governor of Georgia, and his wife, Hattie Jobe Harris.

By 1936, it was acquired by Ralph U. Butler, who operated manganese mines in Cedar Hill, Tennessee and Shady Valley, Tennessee used to make steel for World War II.

== Architectural significance ==
The house was designed in the Italianate architectural style. It has been listed on the National Register of Historic Places since November 7, 1996.
