= Michael Mullins =

Michael or Mike Mullins may refer to:

- Michael Mullins (politician) (born 1953), Irish Fine Gael politician
- Michael J. Mullins (born 1953), English singer and songwriter
- Michael Mullins (serial killer), American serial killer
- Mike Mullins (rugby union) (born 1970), New Zealand/Irish rugby union player
- Mickey Mullins (born 1968), Irish hurler
- Michael Mullins, actor in the 1976 film The Pom Pom Girls
