= Doe Valley, Tennessee =

Unincorporated community in Tennessee, United States

Coordinates: 36°26′47″N 81°54′09″W

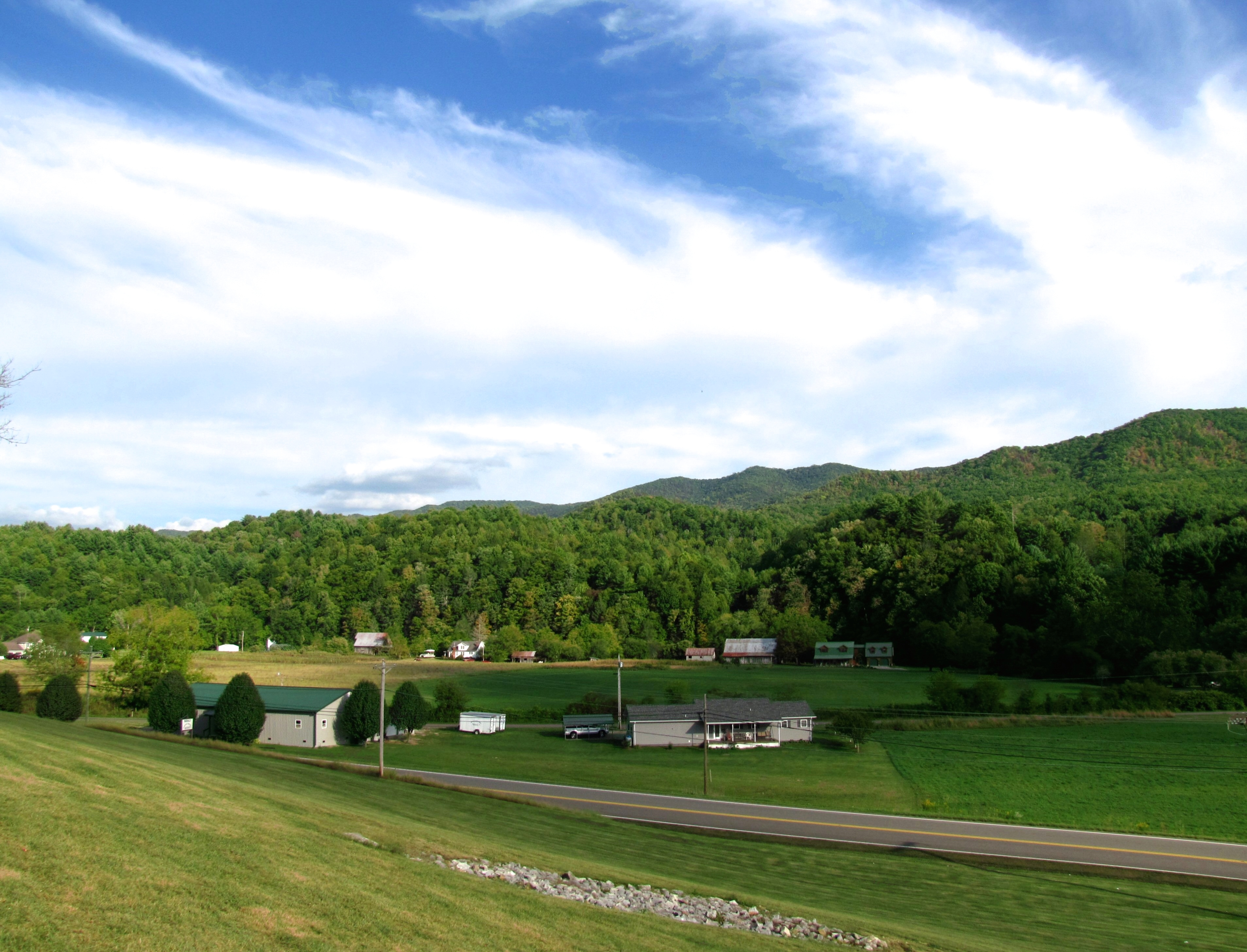
Houses in Doe Valley

Doe Valley is an unincorporated community in Johnson County, Tennessee. The community is located along Tennessee State Route 67 west of Mountain City and east of Butler, and lies roughly adjacent to the communities of Pandora (to the southwest) and Dewey (to the northeast). It is the location of the Tennessee Department of Correction's Northeast Correctional Complex.

Doe Valley is situated in the upper Doe Creek Valley between the Iron Mountains to the north and Doe Mountain to the south.

== Recreation ==
Doe Valley is the location of Johnson County-Chamber Park, which hosts an annual fair, rodeo, and other events.

The community is located within 20 minutes of TVA's Watauga Lake and several TVA and Cherokee National Forest recreation areas.

== Education ==
Doe Valley is the location of Doe Elementary School, serving preschool through sixth grade.

== Community services ==
The Doe Valley Volunteer Fire Department provides fire protection, while Johnson County Sheriff's Department provides police services.

== Economy ==
Doe Valley has two stores, A Dollar general, and the Doe Valley Exxon Food Mart, and several small businesses.
