= Laurel Fork Railway =

Logging railroad in Tennessee

The mill at Braemar, near present-day Hampton, Tennessee.

The Laurel Fork Railway was a small, standard-gauge logging railroad that operated entirely in Carter County, Tennessee from 1912 to 1927. Built by the Pittsburgh Lumber Company to serve a double-band sawmill at Braemar, in present-day Hampton, Tennessee.

The Laurel Fork Railroad at its peak totaled no more than 17 miles (27 km) of rail. Lines and spurs carried timber from 12,000 acres (49 km^{2}) of the mountainous watershed of the Laurel Fork of the Doe River that was estimated to contain 150 million board feet (350,000 m^{3}) of lumber.

A proposed interchange with the East Tennessee and Western North Carolina Railroad failed over inability to negotiate rates favorable to both companies. As a result, the Laurel Fork was incorporated as a common carrier and a six-mile (9.6 km) line into Elizabethton, Tennessee was built to carry finished lumber to an interchange with the Virginia and Southwestern Railway.

A June 13, 1924, flood on the Doe River washed away much track and roadbed along the floodplain. Coupled with diminished production from the mill, this led to a November 7 filing for abandonment that year with the Interstate Commerce Commission. Some operations continued after the flood, but all virtually all logging along the Laurel Fork ceased by 1927. Parts of the railroad grade are used by the Appalachian Trail in the Pond Mountain Wilderness Area through the Laurel Fork valley between Dennis Cove and Hampton.

== Laurel Fork Railway rolling stock ==
Shay .3 at Braemar.

The Laurel Fork Railroad locomotive roster included three 70-3 Shay geared steam locomotives, road numbers Nos. 1, 2, and 3 c/n 2390, 2391, and 2760, respectively. Two smaller Shays have been incorrectly identified by several authors as being owned by the Laurel Fork. Conversion work on c/n 187 was performed at their shops for another owner. The Laurel Fork has been mistakenly identified as owner of c/n 2195 due to a Lima clerical error. The equipment roster for the rail company also included two log loaders; a steam shovel; 40 flat cars; 12 service cars; and a Model T Ford on dump car wheels that was used for inspection trips. As a freight-only carrier, the Laurel Fork Railway owned no passenger equipment.

Road no.	Shay Class	c/n	Ship/purchase date	Fuel	Cylinders	Gauge	Comments
	13-2	2195	1910	wood	2-6x10	36"	Incorrectly identified by several authors as being owned by the Laurel Fork.
1	70-3	2390	November 23, 1910	coal	3-12x15	std	Shipped new to Laurel Fork Railway. Sold to Conasauga River Lumber Co., Conasauga, Tennessee. Date of sale unknown# Records confirm engine at Conasauga on January 13, 1928. 2390 was still operating in 1949: scrapped in 1954.
	13-2	187	1911	wood	2-7x12	36"	Incorrectly identified by several authors as being owned by the Laurel Fork.
2	70-3	2391	June 1, 1911	coal	3-12x15	std	Shipped new to Laurel Fork Railway. Transferred to Freehold Lumber Co., Flinn, Virginia, by July 1, 1922. Records indicate attempt to acquire loco as early as March 14, 1922, and expressed interest a year earlier. Loco was advertised for sale September 10, 1924. No record thereafter.
3	70-3	2760	April 28, 1914	coal	3-12x15	std	Shipped new to Laurel Fork Railway. Sold to Lutcher & Moore Lumber Co., Orange, Texas, April 21, 1926, through Birmingham Rail & Locomotive Co. Operations were in Fal, Louisiana. This operation moved to New Mexico in 1929 but fate of No. 3 is unknown.
