= Tweetsie Trail =

Rail trail in Tennessee, United States

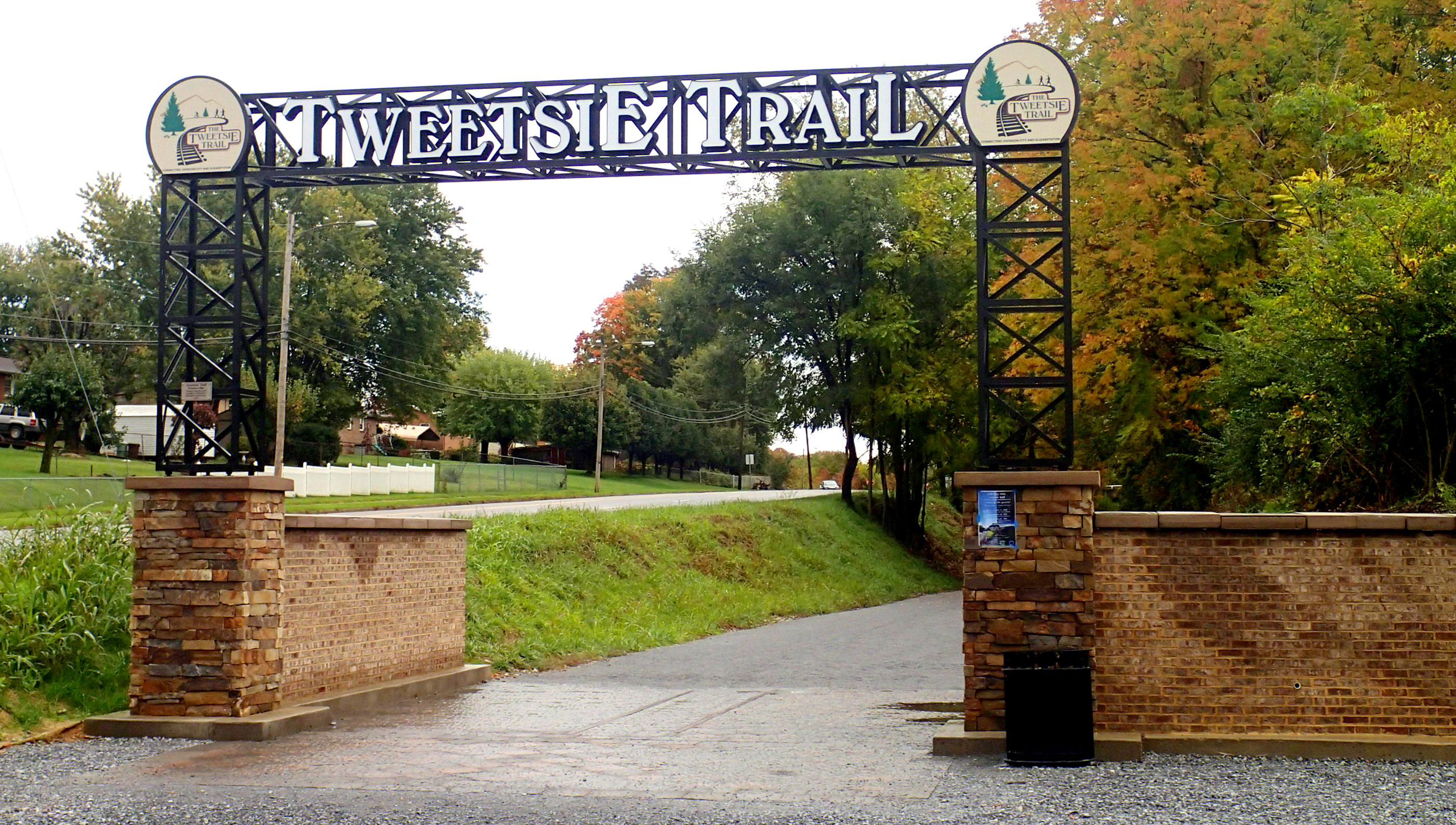
Johnson City Trailhead

The Tweetsie Trail is a 9.6 miles (15.4 km) multi-purpose rail trail in the United States that follows a portion of the Right-Of-Way (ROW) that was created for the East Tennessee & Western North Carolina (ET&WNC) Railroad. Located in northeast Tennessee, the trail runs from Johnson City to Elizabethton, Tennessee. The first mile is in Washington County, and the remainder in Carter County. The entire trail is owned by Johnson City. The Tweetsie name derives from the sound of the whistles used on the steam engines that operated on the narrow gauge railroad. The trail has a fine gravel/ chat surface.

The trail begins at 116 Van Brocklin Way in Johnson City. Two additional nearby parking areas accommodates overflow from the main Trailhead lot. The trail terminates at the intersection of Stateline Road and Blue Ridge Drive at mile marker 9.6, 0.2 miles past a small parking lot and portable restroom at the 9.4 mile marker on the south end of Elizabethton. The many road crossings along the full length of the trail create numerous other access point opportunities.

The trail accommodates walkers, hikers, runners and cyclists. Leashed dogs are allowed. Motorized vehicles and horses are prohibited.

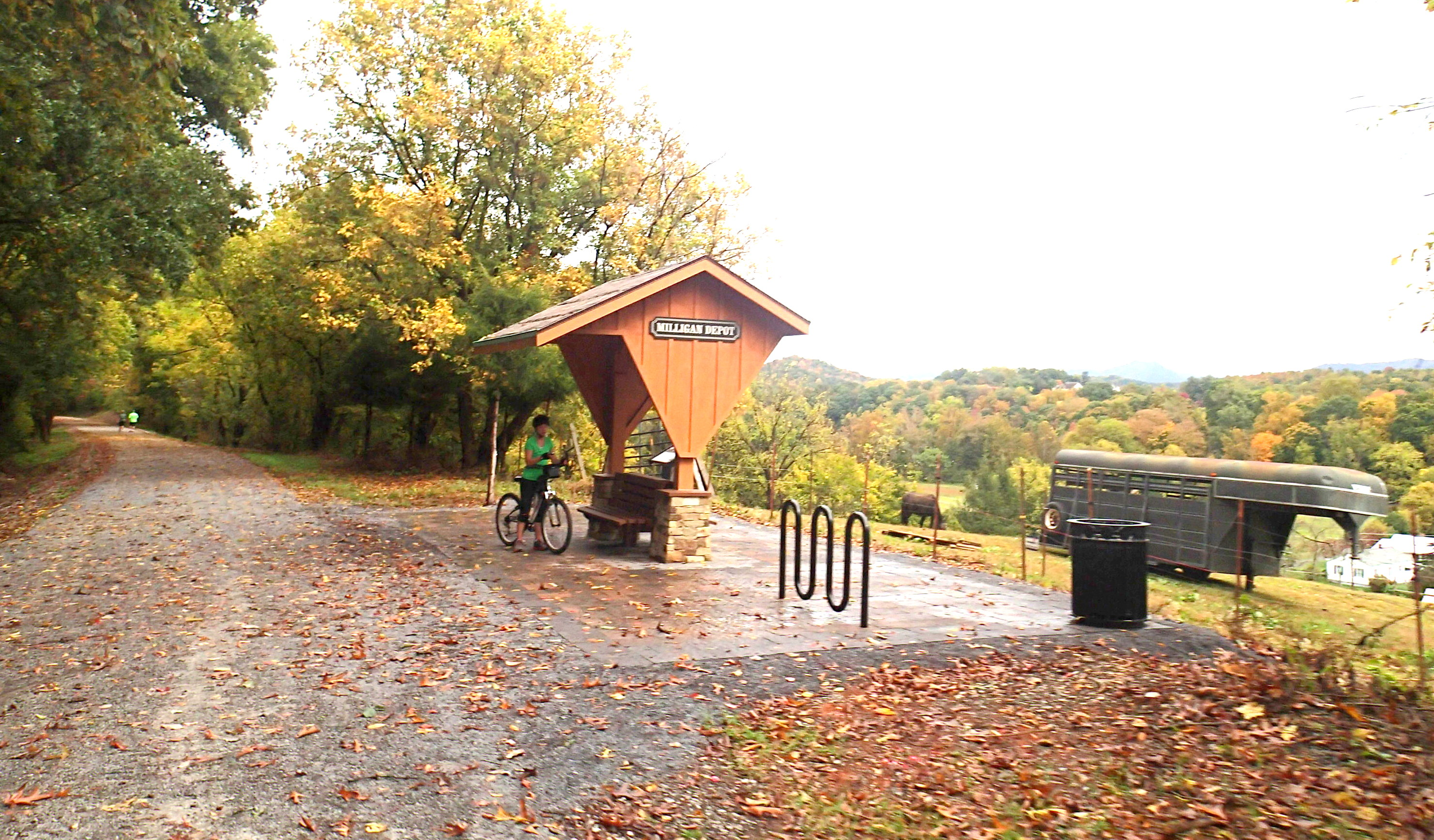
Milligan Station

Travelling from Johnson City at about 1,650 feet (520 m) of elevation, the trail drops about 175 feet (53 m) after 4.5 miles, then gains another 150 feet (45 m)through upon reaching the southernmost point. Along the way, the trail crosses 7 bridges and passes the old railroad stops a Milligan Station reproduction, the Bemburg Depot and a quarry.

Future plans include extending the trail 4.5 miles to Hampton including a replacement trestle over the Doe River and the Tweetsie Tunnel #1.

== History ==
The trail runs on portion of a railroad right-of-way (ROW) that ran from Johnson City to Eizabethton, Hampton, Roan Mountain and to Cranberry NC. then on to Boone, NC.

1866 East Tennessee & Western North Carolina Railroad granted charter

1882 ET&WNC begins operation of 32-mile narrow-gauge service from Johnson City TN to Cranberry NC

1919 ET&WNC extends tracks to 66 miles for service to Boone, N.C.

1940 August Torrential rains wash away large sections of ET&WNC track ending service to Boone

1950 July 13 ET&WNC abandons route between Elizabethton and Cranberry NC. All Track pulled up and ROW deeded to Carter County

1952 Discontinues all narrow-gauge rail service. All of its steam locomotives are scrapped or destroyed, except for locomotive No. 12

1960's Late. Doe River Gorge Playland, a small amusement park laid tracks along three miles of the gorge, became Hillbilly World in 1971

2003 October 10 East Tennessee Railway abandons route between Johnson City and Elizabethton

2005 Organization begins to create a Trail

2011 April Johnson City initiates negotiations with the ET Railroad, and the corridor was successfully railbanked

2012 Rails and ties were removed to make way for the trail. Sponsors found to cover most expenses reduced cost drastically. NO grants were sought in the early phases to reduce the timeline and attached strings/ limits

2013 December Acquisition was complete and the work to build the trail begins

2014 August Tweetsie Trail opens first 5 miles to Elizabethton

2014 September Tweetsie Trail expanded to 7 miles into Elizabethton

2015 August Tweetsie Trail expanded to full 10 miles across Elizabethton

2016 Carter County announces plans to extend the trail to Roan Mountain including Old Railroad Grade Road

2022 Land donated to expand Tweetsie Trail from Valley Forge to Hampton

2023 April 6.3 million budgeted by Tennessee includes funds to expand Tweetsie Trail from Valley Forge to Hampton including a replacement trestle at Tweetsie Tunnel #1 and Hampton Watershed Trails Expansion

== See also ==
- Cycling infrastructure
- Rail trail
- Railbanking
- List of rail trails
- Virginia Creeper Trail
- Mendota Trail
