= Valley Forge, Tennessee =

Unincorporated community in Tennessee, US

Coordinates: 36°18′23″N 82°11′35″W

Valley Forge is an unincorporated community in Carter County, Tennessee, located along US Route 19E/321 and SR-67, south of Elizabethton and north of Hampton. It is home to one of the largest churches in Carter County: Valley Forge Christian Church. New businesses are popping up, including a new A & L Vape and Tobacco off 19E.
