= East Tennessee and Western North Carolina Railroad =

East Tennessee & Western North Carolina Railroad
Overview
- Headquarters: Johnson City, Tennessee
- Reporting mark: ET&WNC
- Locale: North Carolina and Tennessee
- Dates of operation: 1881–1983

Technical
- Track gauge: 4 ft 8 1/2 in (1,435 mm) standard gauge
- Previous gauge: 3 ft (914 mm) until 1950

The East Tennessee & Western North Carolina Railroad (reporting mark ET&WNC) known colloquially as "the Tweetsie" as a verbal acronym of its initials and also a reference to the sound of its steam whistles) was a primarily 3 ft (914 mm) narrow gauge railroad established in 1866 for the purpose of serving the mines at Cranberry, North Carolina.

The 3 ft (914 mm) narrow gauge portion of the ET&WNC was abandoned in 1950. The 11-mile (17.7 km) 4 ft 8 1/2 in (1,435 mm) standard gauge segment of the line from Johnson City to Elizabethton, Tennessee, operated as East Tennessee Railway until 2003. In 2012 the rails and ties were removed to make way for a rail-trail. This trail was named the Tweetsie Trail.

== History ==
The East Tennessee & Western North Carolina Transportation Company was chartered by the Tennessee General Assembly on May 24, 1866. Lack of financial backing led to the venture's failure, and the railroad was abandoned in 1874. The Cranberry Iron Company (CIC) acquired the line between 1876 and 1879, and designated the railroad one of its subsidiaries. The initial 14.1 miles (22.7 km) segment through the Appalachian Mountains from Johnson City to Hampton, Tennessee via Elizabethton was completed on August 22, 1881, by Pennsylvania-based financier Ario Pardee, and the technical expertise of Thomas Matson (the noted railway engineer); a line extension to Cranberry opened on July 3, 1882. Soon dubbed by mountain residents as the "Railway with a Heart" as railroad personnel often performed errands for the locals (and even allowed passengers to ride for free during the Great Depression), its tickets were even validated with a heart-shaped punch.

The ET&WNC had five Baldwin Locomotive Works 4-6-0 Ten Wheelers: #9 (1911), #10 (1916), #11 (1916), #12 (1917), and #14 (1919). All the engines were painted black, but Clarence Hobbs chose to paint the engines green to resemble the Southern Railway standard gauge engines. In the midst of WWII, passenger service rapidly declined to make it unprofitable to run a full passenger train every day. The ET&WNC used car 15, which was a passenger car equipped with both a post office and baggage compartment. Behind car 15 was either one or two of the railroad's three piggyback flat cars. The ET&WNC's passenger station was next to the trucking depot, while the railyard was another mile down the line. In order to save time, crews picked up car 15 before picking up the piggyback flat cars.

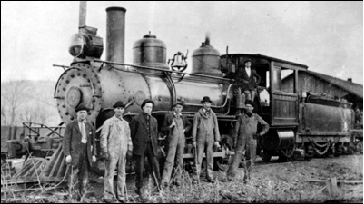
A train crew poses in front of ET&WNC Locomotive No. 4 at Newland, North Carolina circa 1914. The unit was purchased new in 1902 and sold twelve years later to the Linville River Railway.

The ET&WNC hauled iron ore from the Cranberry mines, pig iron from the local forge, and lumber from the forests of western North Carolina. CIC purchased the Linville River Railway (LRR, known as the "Arbuckle" line) in 1913, a line originally constructed in the 1890s to haul lumber between Cranberry and Saginaw, North Carolina. The Linville River Railway was then subsequently extended to Boone, North Carolina, but later suffered heavy track damage from a 1940 flood. The line was eventually abandoned following Interstate Commerce Commission approval on March 22, 1941. Subsequently, much of North Carolina Highway 105 was built along the former route of the LRR.

The ET&WNC was one of the major rail lines to haul both passengers and freight in the region during World War II, though business declined dramatically after the War. The 3 ft (914 mm) narrow gauge track from Elizabethton was soon abandoned, though the ET&WNC retained service between Johnson City and the rayon plants of Elizabethton. The tracks in and around Johnson City (where most of the company's industrial customers were located) were dual gauge to allow for interchange with other railroads. The ET&WNC purchased three standard gauge locomotives: #204 (former AT&N 2-8-0), #205 (former RF&P 0-6-0), and #206 (former Illinois Central 2-6-0). These locomotives were used to switch cars throughout the Johnson City area. The ET&WNC Railroad Company's narrow gauge lines officially ceased operations on October 16, 1950, with scrapping commencing the following year.

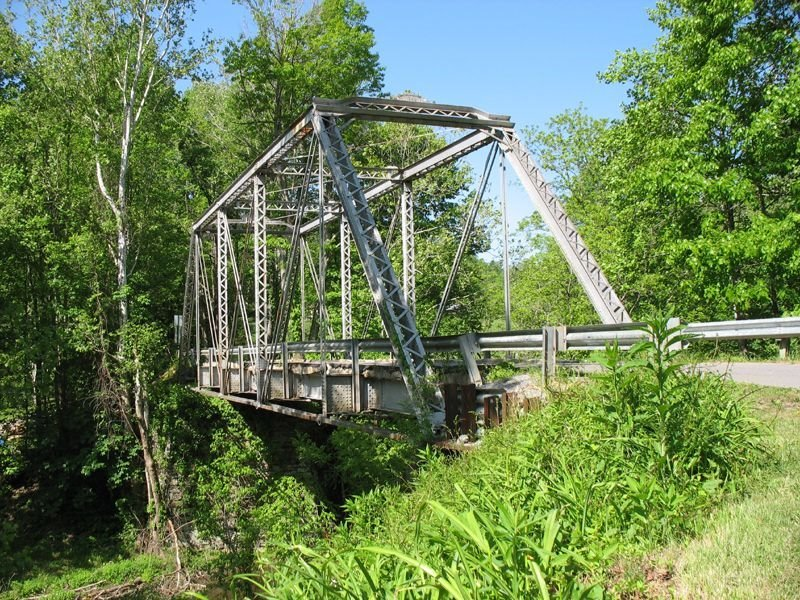
Several ET&WNC bridges are still standing in Carter County, Tennessee. This one is located at the south end of Doe River Gorge.

- East Tennessee & Western North Carolina Railroad Locomotive No. 12
- U.S. National Register of Historic Places
- Location within North Carolina Location within the United States
- Nearest city: Blowing Rock, North Carolina
- Coordinates: 36°10′14″N 81°38′51″W
- Area: less than one acre
- Built: 1917
- Architect: Baldwin Locomotive Works
- NRHP reference No.: 92000147
- Added to NRHP: March 12, 1992

In 1952, the last of the narrow-gauge engines (#9, #11, and #12) were put up for sale. #9 and #11 were offered to be put on display in Elizabethton and Johnson City, but this offer was turned down. The #9 and #11 were scrapped but the #12 was purchased by a group of railroad enthusiasts and shipped to Virginia. Movie cowboy Gene Autry later bought the unit, intending to transport it to California for use in his films. After a lengthy restoration, the locomotive returned to North Carolina on May 23, 1957, along with a few pieces of the original rolling stock. That summer, the "Tweetsie Railroad" became the state's newest travel attraction and family theme park. The train travels over a scenic 3-mile (4.8 kilometers) loop through the mountains near Blowing Rock, close to the original end-of-the-line station in Boone. The park operates two steam locomotives: in addition to former ET&WNC No. 12, in 1960, the company acquired No. 190 (the Yukon Queen, a type 2-8-2 locomotive) from the State of Alaska and restored it for operation. Tweetsie is also home to an authentic wooden coach, former East Broad Top Railroad #5, which is run on special occasions such as their annual Railroad Heritage Weekend event.

The ET&WNC continued operations of the standard gauge lines well after the narrow gauge closures. In 1952, ET&WNC superintendent Clarence Hobbs went to the Southern Railway roundhouse in Asheville, North Carolina, to look for some new motive power. Hobbs wanted to buy 2-8-0 Ks-1 #685 and Ks-2 #835, but the Asheville roundhouse mechanic offered engines #630 and #722, which were in better condition. 630 and 722 were renumbered to 207 and 208, respectively. They served the ET&WNC until December 8, 1967, when the Southern Railway traded two ALCo Rs-3s for the two Ks-1 locomotives to run in their new steam program along with Savannah & Atlanta #750 and Southern Railway 4501. The 630 is now at the Tennessee Valley Railroad Museum in Chattanooga, Tennessee, and the 722 is now at the Great Smoky Mountains Railroad in Bryson City, North Carolina.

The Green Bay Packaging Company of Green Bay, Wisconsin, ultimately acquired the railroad properties and reorganized the company as the East Tennessee Railway (ETRY). Since 1996, the railroad has been owned by Genesee and Wyoming, an international operator of short line railroads, as part of its Rail Link group. The standard gauge line continued to operate switching operations in Johnson City for freight arriving via CSX and Norfolk Southern, until October 10, 2003. In 2012 removal of the remaining ten-mile section of the ET&WNC between Johnson City and Elizabethton began, as part of a Rails to Trails conversion project. The first seven miles of the Tweetsie Trail were completed in September 2014, with the remaining three miles completed in August 2015.

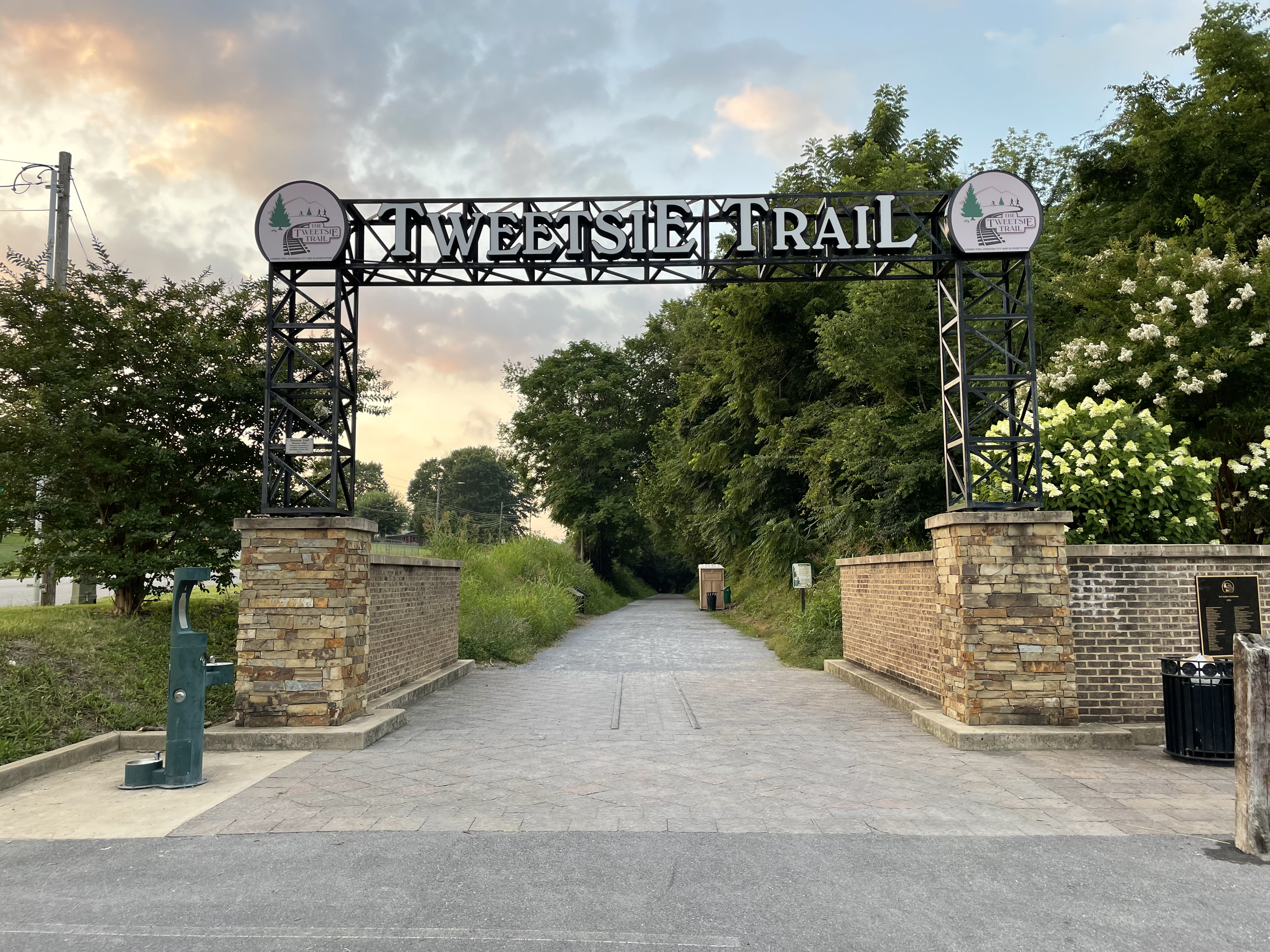
The start of the Tweetsie Trail in Johnson City features a replica embedded narrow gauge set of rails.

In 2016, Carter County began efforts to "extend" this trail to Roan Mountain by marking existing roads. For the most part, this extension does not follow the original ET&WNC right of way but does include a few more miles of the original roadbed along Old Railroad Grade Road. As a result, the East Tennessee Railway now operates very little trackage to serve the remaining industries around the Johnson City yard.

== Roster ==
Narrow gauge steam locomotives
Number/Name	Wheel Arrangement	Builder	Serial number	Built	Retired	Notes
1 "Watauga"	2-6-0	Baldwin Locomotive Works	5403	12/1880	1912	Bought new, sold to the Newell & Byrant Lumber Company in Stoney Creek, Virginia in 1912.
2 "Cranberry"	2-6-0	Baldwin Locomotive Works	5746	8/1881	1910	Bought new, sold to the Hilton Lumber Company as their #14 in Wilmington, North Carolina in 1910.
3 "Unaka"	2-8-0	Baldwin Locomotive Works	6377	9/1882	1911	Bought new, sold to the Fosburgh Lumber Company as their #8 in Fosburgh, North Carolina in 1911.
4	2-8-0	Baldwin Locomotive Works	21114	10/1902	1940s	Bought new, worked on the Linville River Railway. Scrapped in the 1940s.
5	2-8-0	Baldwin Locomotive Works	21893	3/1903	1940	Bought new, to the Linville River as their #5.
6	2-8-0	Baldwin Locomotive Works	24734	9/1904	1935	Bought new, scrapped in the 1930s.
7	0-8-0	Alco-Brooks	39951	6/1906	1940	Bought new. Scrapped in the 1940s
1st #8	4-6-0	Baldwin Locomotive Works	31479	8/1907	1920	Sold to the Gray Lumber Company in 1920. Later scrapped.
2nd #8	4-6-0	Baldwin Locomotive Works	37327	12/1911	1939	Built as Twin Mountain & Potomac Railroad #2. Sold to the Radipan Railroad in 1921. Sold to the ET&WNC in 1926. Scrapped in 1939
9	4-6-0	Baldwin Locomotive Works	36440	4/1911	1950	Bought new. To Linville River Railroad in 1919. Sent back to the ET&WNC in 1940. Scrapped in 1952.
10	4-6-0	Baldwin Locomotive Works	42766	1/1916	1942	Bought new. Sold to the White Pass and Yukon Route in 1942. Destroyed in a roundhouse fire at Whitehorse, Yukon in 1943. Scrapped in 1946.
11	4-6-0	Baldwin Locomotive Works	42862	6/1916	1950	Bought new. Last locomotive to run on the ET&WNC narrow gauge line in October 1950. Scrapped in 1952.
12	4-6-0	Baldwin Locomotive Works	45069	2/1917	1949	Bought new. Sold to the Shenandoah Central Railroad in Rockingham County, Harrisonburg, Virginia in 1952, then to Tweetsie Railroad in 1957 where it continues to operate today. Named "Tweetsie".
14	4-6-0	Baldwin Locomotive Works	52406	9/1919	1942	Bought new. Sold to the White Pass and Yukon Route in 1942. Destroyed in a roundhouse fire at Whitehorse, Yukon in 1943. Scrapped in 1946.
28	2-6-0	Baldwin Locomotive Works	39697	8/1913	1936	Built as Kentwood & Eastern #28. Sold to the Linville River Railroad in 1918. Scrapped in 1936.

Standard gauge steam locomotives
Number/Name	Wheel Arrangement	Builder	Serial number	Built	Retired	Notes
204	2-8-0	Lima Locomotive Works	16858	2/1922	1955	Built as Alabama, Tennessee and Northern Railroad #204. Sold to the ET&WNC in 1939. Scrapped 1955
205	0-6-0	Baldwin Locomotive Works	29768	12/1906	1952	Built as Richmond, Fredericksburg and Potomac Railroad #104, later renumbered to 13. Sold to the ET&WNC in 1940. Sold to the Cadiz Railroad in 1953. Later sold to the Crabtree Coal Company. Scrapped 1956.
206	2-6-0	Brooks Locomotive Works	3693	12/1900	1956	Built as Illinois Central Railroad #556. Sold to the ET&WNC in 1942. Scrapped in 1956.
207	2-8-0	Alco-Richmond	28446	2/1904	12/8/1967	Built as Southern Railway #630. Sold to the ET&WNC in November 1952. Traded back to the Southern for an RS-3 in December 1967. Now under FRA overhaul at the Tennessee Valley Railroad Museum
208	2-8-0	Baldwin Locomotive Works	24729	9/1904	12/8/1967	Built as Southern Railway #722. Sold to the ET&WNC in November 1952. Traded back to the Southern for an RS-3 in December 1967. Now under restoration at the Great Smoky Mountains Railroad in Bryson City, North Carolina
828	2-8-0	Baldwin Locomotive Works	16858	7/1899	8/1937	Built as Norfolk and Western Railway #828. Sold to the ET&WNC in 1927. First standard gauge engine purchased by the ET&WNC. Scrapped 1937.

Diesel locomotives
Number/Name	class	Builder	Serial number	Built	Retired	Notes
209	RS-3	American Locomotive Company	78246	9/1950	1983	Built as Central of Georgia Railway #108. Traded to the ET&WNC by the Southern for 207 and 208.
210	RS-3	American Locomotive Company	78247	9/1950	1983	Built as Central of Georgia Railway #109. Traded to the ET&WNC by the Southern for 207 and 208. Now at the Tennessee Valley Railroad Museum.
211	RS-32	American Locomotive Company	84027	3/1962	1999	Built as Southern Pacific #4002. Now at the Delaware And Lackawanna Railroad.

== See also ==
- East Tennessee Railway
- Laurel Fork Railway
- Tweetsie Railroad
- Southern Railway 630
- Southern Railway 722

== Historic designations ==
- National Register of Historic Places #NPS–92000147 — East Tennessee & Western North Carolina Railroad Locomotive No. 12
