= Michael Mullins (serial killer) =

American serial killer

- Mugshot
- Born: June 28, 1961 (age 65); Memphis, Tennessee, U.S.
- Status: Incarcerated
- Convictions: First degree murder (3 counts); Attempted first degree murder Aggravated rape (4 counts)
- Penalty: Life imprisonment without the possibility of parole

Details
- Victims: 3
- Span of crimes: 1999–2012
- Country: United States
- State: Tennessee
- Date apprehended: June 7, 2012
- Imprisoned at: Northeast Correctional Complex

Michael Mullins (born June 28, 1961) is an American serial killer who murdered three women in Memphis, Tennessee between 1999 and 2012, and unsuccessfully tried to kill a fourth woman in Knoxville, Tennessee. On December 5, 2014, Mullins was convicted of three counts of first-degree murder and was sentenced to life in prison.

== Early life ==
Mullins was born in Memphis on June 28, 1961, one of seven children. For the first few years of his life, he lived with his mother Ida, before he moved to West Memphis to live with his father. According to some, there is evidence that Mullins was illiterate. Mullins had failed first grade, and throughout his school years he was frequently absent. On IQ tests, he scored an average of between 59 and 69. Mullins eventually dropped out of school in 1977, when he was in his ninth-grade year. Allegedly, three years later Mullins mother was shot and killed in front of him, with him saying she died in his arms. However, there are no records of her death according to the Memphis police department. Mullins father, however, had died around this time in an unrelated incident.

Afterwards, on multiple occasions, Mullins attempted suicide. He eventually told a physiatrist that he had been seeing hallucinations. He was eventually diagnosed with schizophrenia and bipolar disorder. Mullins was prescribed several medications but was put in rehab on multiple occasions due to not taking his meds. Mullins usually lived with his sister Janice and brother William. For some time, Mullins worked for William's landscaping company, before finding a job in concrete construction, which often took him to trips through Texas and Louisiana. Over the years, Mullins developed a drug addiction.

== Murders ==
Over the course of 13 years, Mullins viciously assaulted four women, killing three of them. The first to be attacked was 43-year-old Beatrice Marie Cole, who was homeless and a former mental patient. On May 28, 1999, she was attacked by Mullins outside of the former National Bank of Commerce. He raped her and smashed in her head with a brick, which killed her. After the brutal murder Mullins laid out Cole's body between the building and a staircase and covered her with a yellow blanket, attempting to make the body look like a sleeping homeless person. The body laid there for about five hours, until maintenance workers and a janitor found it, but thinking it was a sleeping vagrant they attempted to wake her up. Eventually, when they removed the blanket, they saw that she was murdered. Her family held a small funeral for her on June 5 and buried her body in Marion Memorial Cemetery.

Over eight years later, Mullins attacked his second victim. On April 18, 2008, he beat up 79-year-old Jessie Lee Maples in Morningside Park. She was found later that same day and was taken to the hospital. Maples spent the next 21 days in intensive care before being moved to a private nursing home. The attack was so brutal that over the next three years Maples was taken care of in a private living facility until her death in November 2012. Apparently, her death was not caused by the attack, but happened due to currently unknown circumstances, so her death was not ruled a homicide.

In early August 2011, Mullins attacked 46-year-old Valerie Ector with a concrete block, using it to smash her head in several times, fracturing her skull and breaking her jaw. He then dragged her body more than 100 feet across a parking lot, leaving a trail of blood. He hid her body next to a fence and, like with Cole, laid a blanket over her to disguise it as a sleeping homeless person. An employee of a nearby building, however, discovered the trail of blood and followed it to the blanket. Mullins committed his last attack on June 6, 2012. That day, he used a brick to beat to death 67-year-old Gwendolyn Jackson in Downtown Memphis. He left her body near the St. Mary's Catholic Church, where it was eventually found.

== Arrest, convictions and imprisonment ==
The day after Jackson's murder, Mullins was arrested based upon his fingerprints being found on a paper bag near the scene. After his arrest, a swab of his DNA was taken and matched to the two other murders. In addition, he became a suspect in the attempted murder of Maples, but at the time, he was only a suspect. In 2013, following a mental evaluation, he was indicted with the three murders and was ordered to be held without bail until his trial. On December 5, 2014, Mullins pleaded guilty to three counts of first-degree murder and three counts of aggravated rape, for which he was given three life sentences for the murder charges and three terms of 15 years imprisonment for the rape charges. The sentences were to run concurrently.

The following month, he was charged with one count of attempted first degree murder and one count of aggravated rape, charges related to the 2008 attack on Maples. On May 1, 2015, Mullins was sentenced to 50 years in prison for the attack.

== See also ==
- List of serial killers in the United States
