= I-70 killer =

Unidentified American serial killer

- Various sketches of the I-70 killer
- Born: Unknown
- Height: 5 ft 7–9 in (1.70–1.75 m)

Details
- Victims: 6–9+
- Span of crimes: April 8 – May 7, 1992 (possibly until 1993)
- Country: United States
- States: Indiana, Missouri, Kansas, Texas (suspected)

The I-70 killer is an unidentified American serial killer who is believed to have killed six store clerks in the Midwestern United States in the spring of 1992. His nickname derives from the fact that several of the stores in which his victims worked were a few miles from Interstate 70.

The victims were usually young, petite, brunette women. One was a man, but it is believed that the killer mistook him for a woman because the store had a woman's name and the victim had long hair. The stores were all specialty stores and usually robbed of only small amounts of cash. The killer is also suspected of shooting three store clerks in Texas in 1993 and 1994, one of whom survived, as well as a 2001 murder of a store clerk in Terre Haute, Indiana.

The case was featured on Unsolved Mysteries, America's Most Wanted, Dark Minds, and People Magazine Investigates, but the killer has not been identified and investigators have not publicly named any suspects.

== 1992 murder spree ==
=== Robin Fuldauer ===
The killing spree began on April 8, 1992, with the murder of 26-year-old Payless ShoeSource manager Robin Fuldauer in Indianapolis. She was alone in the store when she was shot sometime around 1:30 p.m. Her body was discovered in a storage room in the back of the store around 3 p.m. Less than $100 had been stolen from the cash register.

=== Patricia Magers and Patricia Smith ===
The next two murders occurred on April 11 at the La Bride d'Elegance bridal shop in Wichita. The victims were Patricia Smith, 23, and the store's owner, Patricia Magers, 32. As this was the only case involving multiple victims, investigators believe the killer was under the impression that there was only one woman in the store. The women had stayed past the normal closing time of 6 p.m. to allow a male customer to pick up a cummerbund. They let the killer into the store, thinking he was the customer they were expecting. After the women were murdered, the actual customer arrived to pick up the cummerbund and came face-to-face with the killer. He noticed that the killer had a gun and the killer asked the customer to come with him to the back of the store. The customer refused, after which the killer told him to leave the scene. Had the customer cooperated with the killer, he almost certainly would have been murdered. The customer was so frightened that he did not report the incident until more than an hour had passed. He later provided details for a composite sketch of the killer, describing him as a slender white man with reddish hair armed with an Uzi-style gun.

=== Michael McCown ===
On April 27, Michael McCown, 40, was killed in his mother Sylvia's ceramics store in Terre Haute, Indiana, around 4 p.m. McCown's wallet and less than $50 were stolen from the store. No witnesses reported seeing the killer beforehand. McCown was the only male victim of the spree, and investigators believe the killer chose the store because the store's name, Sylvia's Ceramics, seemed to make it a good target. It is believed that McCown was mistaken for a woman because he wore his hair in a ponytail and was shot from behind while kneeling to stock shelves.

=== Nancy Kitzmiller ===
On May 3, 24-year-old Nancy Kitzmiller was killed while working alone at Boot Village, a footwear shop in St. Charles, Missouri. She opened the shop at noon and was found dead by customers at 2:30, shot in the back of the head. She was supposed to be off that day but came in so that a co-worker could have the day off. Some money was taken from the cash register. No one heard the shot, but a witness saw Kitzmiller with a customer just minutes before her death, and this sighting helped police create a composite drawing.

=== Sarah Blessing ===
The final confirmed murder occurred on May 7 in Raytown, Missouri. The victim was 37-year-old Sarah Blessing, who was working in her gift shop, Store of Many Colors. The murder occurred during the day, and the owner of the video store next to Blessing's shop saw the killer enter the shop, heard a pop, and saw him leave. He discovered Blessing's body after checking to see what had happened. A clerk at a nearby grocery store also saw the killer. He was climbing a hill toward I-70.

== Suspected murders ==
=== 1993 Texas murders ===
Investigators believe the I-70 killer may be responsible for two murders in 1993 and an attempted murder in 1994, all of which occurred in Texas. The two murder victims were 51-year-old Mary Ann Glasscock, who was killed on September 25 in Fort Worth at the Emporium Antiques store, and 22-year-old Amy Vess, who was shot to death in a dance apparel store in Arlington on November 1.

The surviving victim was Vicki Webb, 35, who was shot on January 15, 1994, in Houston at the Alternatives gift shop. She briefly talked to the shooter before he shot her in the back of the head. The bullet did not penetrate Webb's head after hitting a large vertebra. The shooter tried to shoot her again, but his gun misfired and he left.

The modus operandi of the Texas killer was very similar to the I-70 killer's and he used a .22-caliber firearm, the same caliber as the I-70 killer. But a ballistics test determined that the gun used in the Texas murders was not the same as the one used in the I-70 killings, so investigators cannot confirm that the I-70 killer committed the shootings in Texas.

=== 2001 Terre Haute murder ===
In November 2001, Terre Haute police announced that the I-70 killer was a suspect in the 2001 murder of 31-year-old liquor store clerk Billy Brossman. On November 30, 2001, Brossman was working alone at the 7th and 70 Liquor Store in Terre Haute. Security camera footage showed a white male suspect enter the store and pull a gun on Brossman, who was standing behind the register. The suspect led Brossman to the back of the store, where he was later found dead with a gunshot wound to the back of the head. Brossman's murder occurred just seven blocks from the murder of Michael McCown and was similar in modus operandi to the I-70 murders. Unlike in the I-70 murders, security footage of Brossman's killer exists and police have said they have a person of interest in the case.

== Investigation ==
The murders were conclusively linked after a St. Charles detective suspected a connection. All the murders were committed with a .22-caliber firearm and the victims were mostly petite, young women with long dark hair. Aside from the Wichita murders, all the victims were alone. All were shot in the back of the head. None of the scenes had any signs of sexual assault and while all stores were robbed, robbery appeared to be a secondary motive as all the stores were small specialty businesses, which did not have much money. The murders took place at slow times of day when the stores were deserted, such as after lunch or around closing time. Several of them were in strip malls near I-70.

Based on witness testimony, police strongly believe the murder weapon was an Intratec Scorpion pistol or an Erma Werke ET22 pistol, but have not definitively ruled out other .22-caliber firearm models. The ammunition used in the killings was .22-caliber CCI copper-clad lead bullets. The cartridges' casings showed traces of jeweler's rouge. Midwest authorities linked the killer to the 1994 shootings in Texas, but Texas authorities were not convinced of a connection, as different guns were used. Based on witness descriptions, investigators produced two composite sketches and a physical description of the killer. He was described as a thin white man in his twenties or thirties, 5'7"-5'9" (1.70-1.75 m) tall, with lazy eyelids and sandy blond or reddish hair. During the initial investigation, two men were investigated and eliminated as suspects:

- Donald Waterhouse of Dyer County, Tennessee, was arrested in June 1992 for the killings of his mother and stepfather, and while in custody was investigated as a suspect for the I-70 murders by Kansas authorities. Waterhouse, who was 37 years old, was eliminated due to differences in height, age, and hairstyle from the killer.
- Sean Patrick Goble of Asheboro, North Carolina, was arrested in 1995 for the murders of four women in North Carolina, Tennessee, and Alabama. He was named a suspect in the I-70 case by Missouri authorities, but due to differences in modus operandi and physical description was eliminated as a suspect.

In 2021, the St. Charles police department published age-progressed versions of the original composite sketch to show what the killer may look like today. Investigators believe the killer is between 52 and 70 years old if he is alive.

== See also ==
- List of fugitives from justice who disappeared
- List of serial killers in the United States
