= East Tennessee Railway =

East Tennessee Railway, L.P.

Overview
- Headquarters: Johnson City, Tennessee
- Reporting mark: ETRY
- Locale: Johnson City, Tennessee
- Dates of operation: 1983–

Technical
- Track gauge: 4 ft 8 1/2 in (1,435 mm) standard gauge
- Previous gauge: 3 ft (914 mm)
- Length: 5 miles (8.0 km)

Other
- Website: Official website

The East Tennessee Railway, L.P. (reporting mark ETRY) is a short line railroad connecting CSX Transportation and the Norfolk Southern Railway in Johnson City, Tennessee. Since 2005, the railroad has been owned by Genesee and Wyoming, an international operator of short line railroads, as part of its Rail Link group. The railroad uses a single diesel locomotive, SW1200 #214, to serve a small number of industries and a transloading facility, as well as to provide interchange services between NS and CSX.

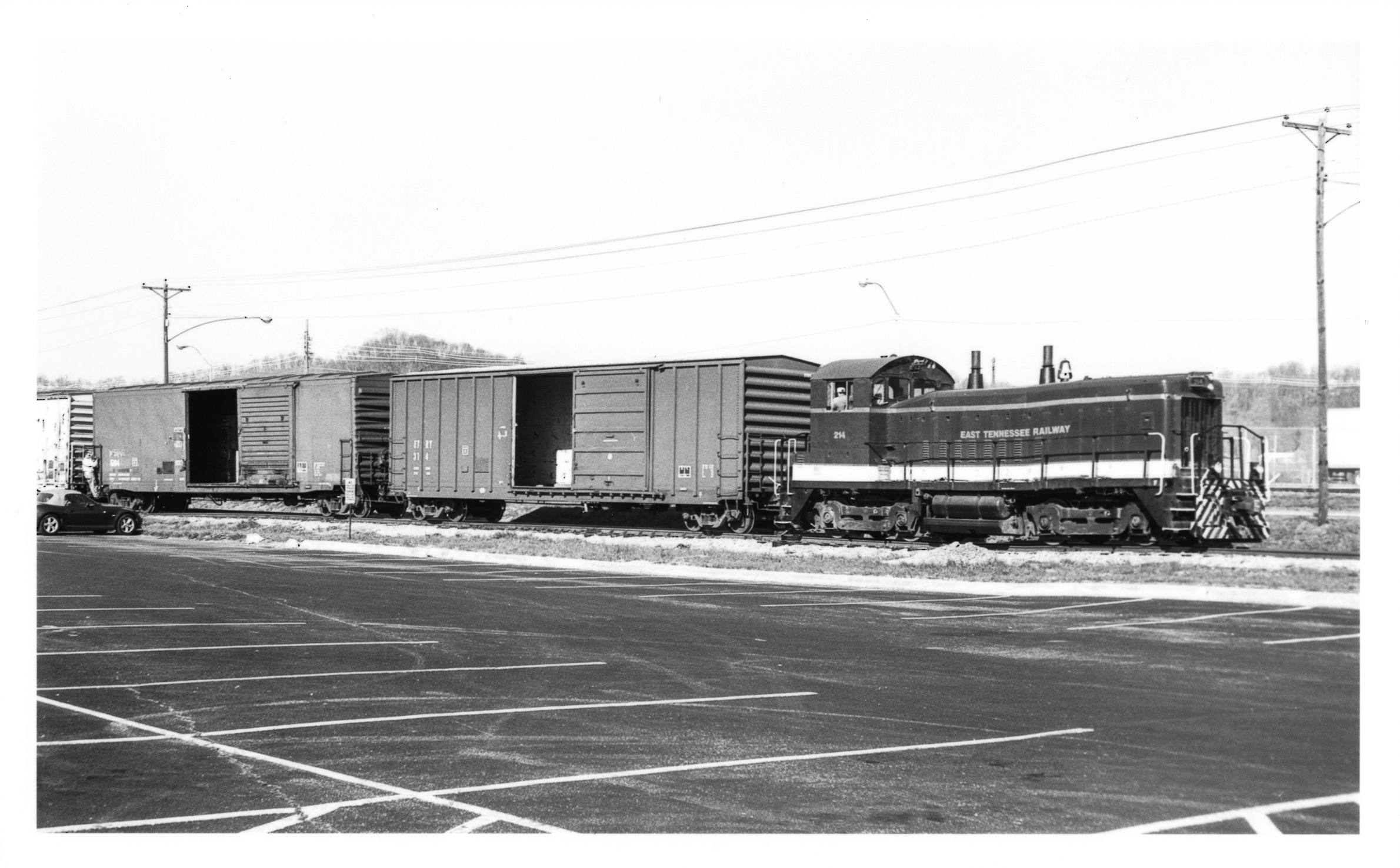
An East Tennessee Railway train is in Elizabethton, TN, on March 24, 2000. Tom King photo, Donald R. Hensley Jr. Collection.

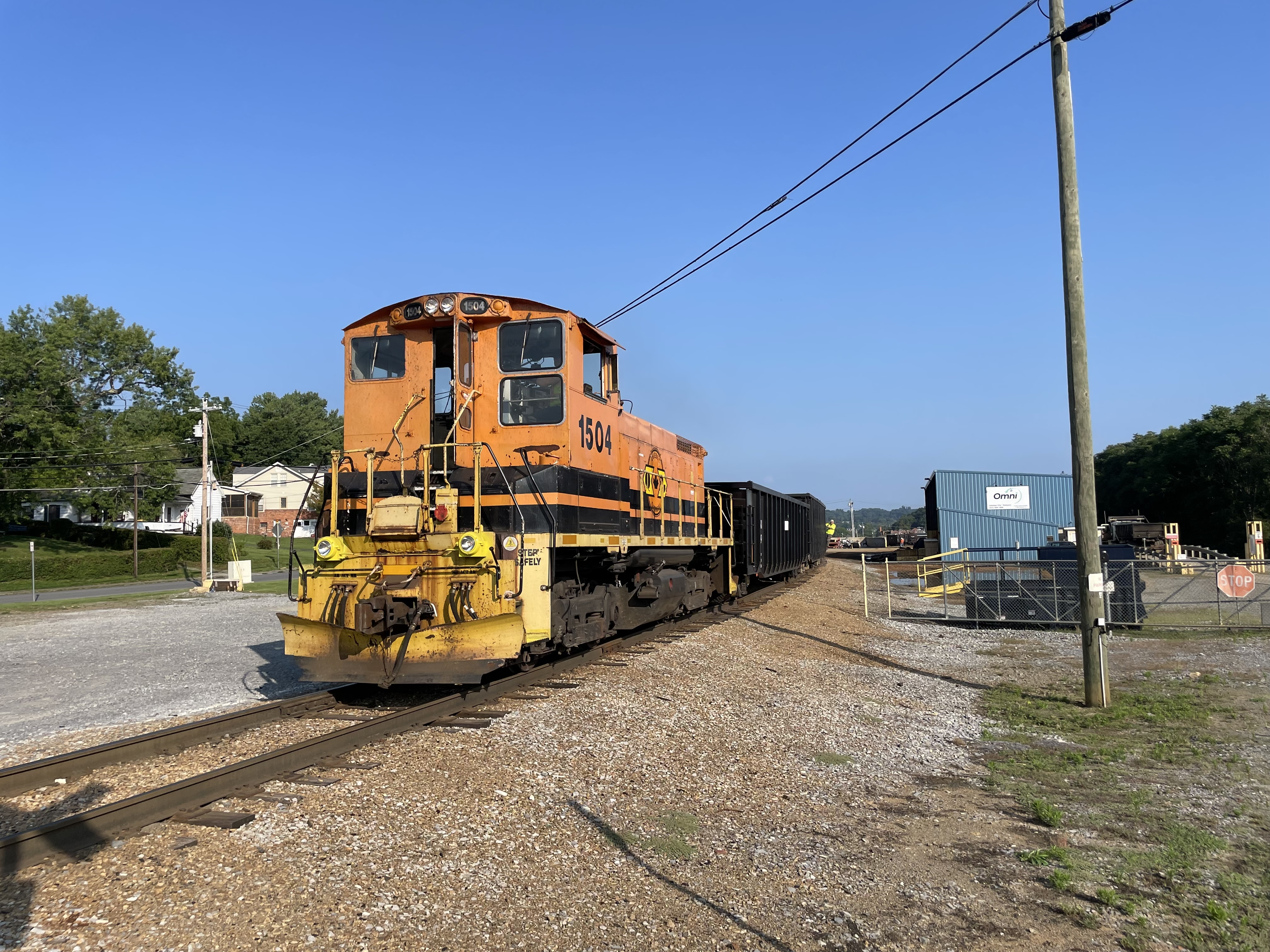
A Quebec & Gatineau Railway engine from another Genessee & Wyoming operation switches the Omni scrapyard in Johnson City

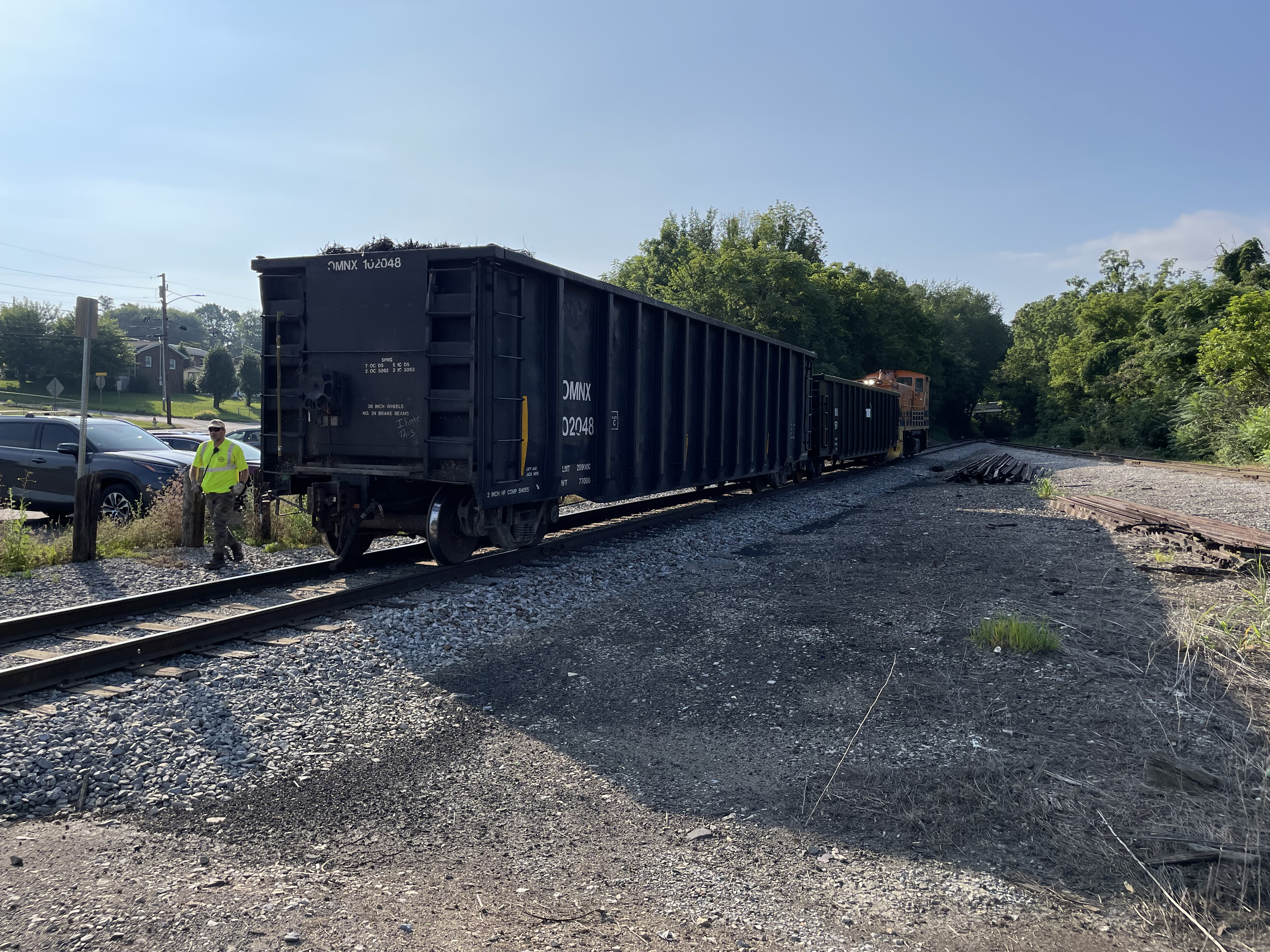
The conductor is flagging Alabama Street as the crew shoves back to the yard with loads from the Omni scrapyard in Johnson City, TN.

The current standard gauge railroad is a remnant of a larger, narrow gauge railroad, the East Tennessee and Western North Carolina Railroad, chartered in 1866 to haul iron ore from Cranberry, North Carolina to Johnson City across the Appalachian Mountains. Through an acquisition and track extensions, the railroad grew to serve Boone, North Carolina and Saginaw, North Carolina. ET&WNC used dual gauge tracks between Johnson City and Elizabethton; eventually the railroad ceased all narrow gauge operations and only operated standard gauge service on this one section. Later, with a change in ownership this limited line was reorganized as the East Tennessee Railway.

In 2003, the last train left Elizabethton, TN and in 2009 the line was formally abandoned and railbanked. The rails and ties were removed in 2012 to make way for a rail-trail. The East Tennessee Railway still services customers around the yard in Johnson City and still makes deliveries to the CSXT and NS. ETRY started out with a two-man crew for many years, and have just now upped to a three-man crew. Operations are Monday through Friday. It can handle cars up to 286,000 pounds.

== See also ==
- Tweetsie Railroad
- East Tennessee and Western North Carolina Railroad
- Genesee & Wyoming Inc.
