= Hampton High School (Hampton, Tennessee) =

Location
- 766 First Avenue; Hampton, Tennessee 37658; United States; 36.276°N 82.176°W

Information
- School type: Public
- School district: Carter County Schools
- Superintendent: Kevin Ward
- Principal: Kayla Clawson
- Teaching staff: 31.60 (FTE)
- Grades: 9–12
- Enrollment: 395 (2023–2024)
- Average class size: ~22
- Student to teacher ratio: 12.50
- Hours in school day: 8
- Color
- Fight song: Notre Dame Victory March
- Mascot: Bulldog
- Rival: Happy Valley High School
- Feeder schools: Hampton Elementary (K–8), Little Milligan (K–8)
- Website: School website

Hampton High School is a high school in Hampton, Tennessee.

== History ==
The school was originally built during the 1940s. The elementary school was destroyed by a fire in October 1959. A new high school was built during 1961 thru 1963. The first students went to the new high school in late 1963. The first class of students to go all four years to this new school graduated in 1967. The old high school became the elementary school. Both buildings are still in use.

=== Hurricane Helene ===
The school's building and its campus were severely damaged by Hurricane Helene in September 2024. The Tennessee state government has proposed appropriating $20 million for repairs. The high school's operations have been temporarily moved to the school system's central office, which is a former elementary school building.

== Sports ==
Current sports teams include: baseball, softball, boys' basketball, girls' basketball, cheerleading, boys' cross country, girls' cross country, football, boys' golf, girls' golf, girls' volleyball, boys' track and field, girls' track and field and marching band.
