= Dr. No (serial killer) =

Unidentified American serial killer

- Other names: "Ohio Prostitute Killer" "I-71 Killer"

Details
- Victims: 10+
- Span of crimes: 1981–1990
- Country: United States
- States: Ohio; Illinois; New York; Pennsylvania

Dr. No is the nickname given to a suspected American serial killer thought to be responsible for the murders of at least ten women and girls in Ohio, between 1981 and 1990. As victims, Dr. No primarily chose sex workers from parking lots and truck stops located alongside Interstate 71. There are suspicions that he committed three similar killings in New York, Illinois, and Pennsylvania, between 1986 and 1988.

== Murders ==
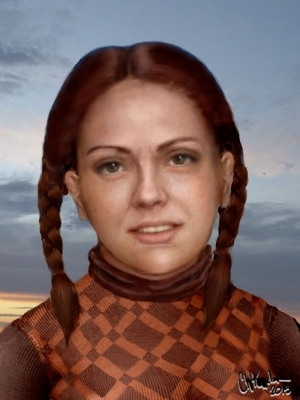
Forensic rendering by Carl Koppelman of Marcia King, nicknamed "Buckskin Girl," who remained unidentified between 1981 and 2018.

Some of the victims were sex workers at the Union 76 truck stop in Austintown, east of Akron and west of Youngstown, which is the largest in Ohio, leading the investigators to suspect that the killer was a truck driver. Most victims were found without underwear and shoes.

The killings began in 1981, when the body of a young woman was found in Miami County, Ohio on April 24. After a forensic examination, it was determined that the victim died from strangulation, having received a head injury beforehand. At the time of her discovery, no personal belongings or documents were found, making her identification difficult. She was well-groomed, and there was no evidence of sexual assault; investigators did not characterize her as a sex worker. She was nicknamed "Buckskin Girl", from a tasseled buckskin poncho she was wearing. In 2018, the victim was finally identified as Marcia King.

The next victim was 25-year-old Marcia Matthews, who was found, beaten, but barely alive, on June 16, 1985, by a trucker one mile away from the Union 76 truck stop. She died two and a half days later from a traumatic brain injury, sustained after a beating with a blunt object.

On July 20, 1986, the body of 23-year-old Shirley Dean Taylor was discovered, who was also beaten and strangled to death. Before her disappearance, she was seen at the Union 76 truck stop, where, according to witness reports, she went to meet a regular client nicknamed "Dr. No", whose identity was never established. Her body was discovered a few miles from the place of her disappearance, with her underwear and shoes missing.

In December 1986, 18-year-old April Barnett also went missing from the Union 76 truck stop, with her body found a few days later 70 miles from Austintown. As with previous cases, the victim was beaten and strangled to death, with some of her clothes missing as well.

A few days later, 28-year-old Jill Allen was found murdered in Illinois, near Interstate 70. Despite the fact that she had been found in another state, she was deemed a victim of the same killer due to the modus operandi. Allen had also been beaten and asphyxiated, with strangulation marks found on her neck. Her shoes, bra, and underwear were never found.

The next victim was 27-year-old Anne-Marie Patterson, who went missing on February 7, 1987, from the Union 76 Austintown. Her semi-decomposed body was found 40 days later, 250 miles away from Austintown, near Cincinnati. A week before the disappearance, Patterson had been arrested by police. At the police station, she gave information about a murder suspect and described his car. During the investigation, law enforcement agencies discovered that Patterson had made an appointment via CB radio with the client, nicknamed "Dr. No", whom she characterized extremely negatively, and then disappeared. From this, the police and later the media used the nickname for the unidentified criminal.

On August 10, 1987, another victim's body was found in Englewood. The victim's jeans and underwear were at her ankles, while the upper parts of the clothes were missing. According to the nature of grass depressions and tire tracks located at the scene, forensic experts determined that the killer threw the victim's corpse out of his car. An autopsy revealed that the victim was a young woman, aged 20–25, and had died from strangulation. Despite the abundance of tattoos on her body, as well as jewelry the offender had not stolen, she remained unidentified until 2010. The victim was identified as Paula Beverly Davis, 21, after relatives recognized her tattoos pictured from her listing in the National Missing and Unidentified Persons System. Although she was included on the task force relating to the murders (formed in 1991), additional theories exist suggesting a drug dealer's retaliation, an unknown woman last seen in her company, or an unrelated serial killer.

On November 22, 1987, the body of 19-year-old Lamonica Cole was discovered at a truck stop in Breezewood, Pennsylvania. Despite the fact that the truck stop was located on another interstate, Cole was included as a potential victim because she had died from strangulation, was a native of Ohio and some of her things had been recovered, while others not. During the investigation, Lamonica's pimp, 24-year-old Derrick Mims, told police that the alleged killer with whom Cole left on the day of her disappearance was traveling in a blue semi-trailer truck with white stripes.

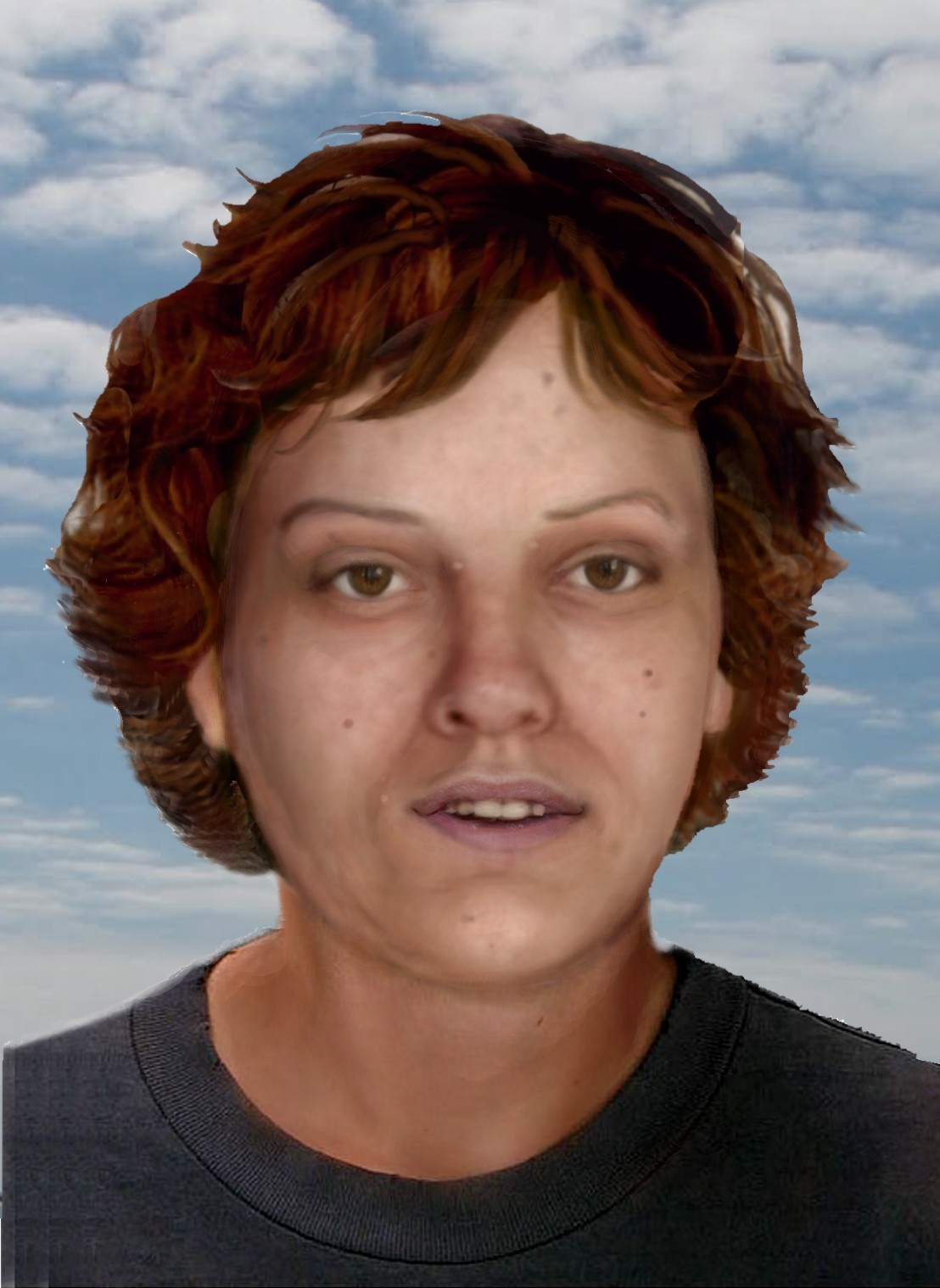
Forensic rendering by Carl Koppelman of Patrice Corley, who remained unidentified for 27 years until her identification in 2017.

31-year-old Terri Roark was murdered March 29, 1988 in New York, her body found on one of the bridges passing through the Mohawk River. The medical examiner found that the woman died from a traumatic brain injury that occurred during a beating with a blunt object several hours before the discovery of her body. Some of Roark's clothing, including underwear and shoes, were never found, leading investigators to include her in the list of potential victims of "Dr. No".

On April 19, 1990, another female's body was found near a truck stop off I-70 in Licking County, 25 miles east of Columbus. Most of her clothes were missing, though her panties remained. An autopsy concluded that she had died from a traumatic brain injury resulting from a beating, and had had sexual intercourse 12–24 hours before her death. With these conclusions, the investigators suggested that the victim was a sex worker and had fallen victim to the serial killer. Despite multiple attempts to identify her, she remained unidentified (with the placeholder name "Jane Doe 2") until her identification as Patrice Anita Corley (29) in 2017.

== Speculations ==
In February 2019, a connection was made between the profile of Dr. No and Samuel Legg III. Legg used to be a long-haul trucker who followed the same highway routes as Dr. No. However, DNA traced Legg to 4 unrelated murders that happened in the 1990s under a different set of victims. Also, officials concluded that Legg could not have been Dr. No because, the earliest murders occurred when Legg was only 12 years old, long before he could obtain a commercial driver's license.

Samuel Legg III was connected to the 1997 Medina rape case as well as the 4 unsolved murders during the 1990s. Legg was connected to 3 of the murders by a physical DNA sample. The 4 victims of these unsolved murders were Sharon Kedzierski, Victoria Jane Collins, Julie Konkol and Angela Hicks (Angela Hicks was not connected by a DNA sample). Legg was never found legally responsible for the 4 murders, but he was for the 1997 Medina rape case involving the abduction of a 17-year-old hitchhiker. Legg never went to trial, as medical experts and the Medina County judge declared he was mentally incompetent to stand trial. He had been diagnosed with severe schizophrenia and neurosyphilis. He is currently held in a maximum-security state psychiatric hospital, located in Columbus, Ohio. He is expected to remain there indefinitely, due to his irreversible mental state.

Law enforcement officially concluded that the nickname of "Dr. No" was an umbrella term for multiple independent truck-driver serial killers operating over a 30-year span.

== Investigation ==
During the course of the investigation, the police interviewed hundreds of sex workers, pimps, service station employees and truck drivers, in an attempt to find witnesses and identify the offender. According to the witnesses, the killer appeared to be a tall, large man with fair skin and dark hair, aged 25–40, wore glasses and talked with an accent matching that of somebody from the Northeastern states. The vehicle he was driving was described as a 1984 International silver truck with a wind deflector and a red hood. The Ohio State Highway Patrol and volunteers from various civil society organizations posted over 4,000 photographs of the victims and an identikit of the offender at 130 truck stops and service stations across the state, and 1,350 truck stops in nine other states through which interstate motorways where the serial killer would ride through, offering $10,000 for information about him.

As a result, five people were detained, who at different times were nicknamed "Dr. No", but subsequently no charges were filed against any of them and their names were never disclosed to the public. On most of the corpses, biological traces were discovered that, according to the investigators, came from the perpetrator. To establish if the sperm had the same affiliation, a forensic examination was carried out which gave mixed results, due to the fact that all of the victims had engaged in prostitution during life, and authorities started questioning whether the deaths were actually related.

=== Suspects ===
In April 1991, a resident of Lake County, Ohio, 36-year-old Alvin Wilson, became a suspect. Wilson, who worked as a trucker and owned two tractors, was among those whose hair samples matched those found on some of the victims. Credit card receipts and other evidence indicated his possible responsibility for the Ohio murders. In 1990, he was arrested on charges of assault and attempted murder of a woman in October 1989. After his arrest, the girl contacted police, stating that in 1986, Wilson had picked her up in Akron after paying for her services, and had beat and attempted to strangle her afterward. Wilson was tested for any involvement, but the results were inconclusive.

That same year, a long-haul trucker named John Fautenberry was arrested for several murders committed across four states. He was briefly considered a suspect in the killings, but was later ruled out, as his modus operandi and victim profile were too different.

In June 1994, a 36-year-old trucker from Ohio, James Robert Cruz Jr., was convicted in the March 1993 murder of 17-year-old Dawn Marie Birnbaum in Centre County, Pennsylvania, whose body was found along Interstate 80. The girl's body was discovered a few days after her death. Since most of her clothes were missing, Cruz was considered a possible suspect in the Ohio killings. He was tested, but subsequently, no charges were filed against him concerning the other murders.

In 1995, 28-year-old Sean Patrick Goble, a trucker from North Carolina, who had admitted to killing two prostitutes in Tennessee in April of that year, was among the suspects for the murder of a North Carolina woman in early 1995. As a trucker, Goble traveled to several dozen states across the country, where cases of disappearances and murders of prostitutes along interstate highways were recorded. Following his arrest, Goble was investigated for murders in at least 10 states. Nevertheless, he was cleared of suspicion of being the elusive "Dr. No", since, at the time of the first murder in 1981, he was still in high school, and in the mid-1980s, when the majority of the killings took place, he was serving in the Army and was stationed outside Ohio.

In November 2005, on the basis of DNA profiling, authorities arrested 46-year-old Dellmus Colvin, a truck driver who killed five prostitutes in Toledo. Colvin later admitted to killing at least two others in New Jersey, but vehemently denied any involvement in the "Dr. No" murders during the 1980s.

== See also ==
- List of serial killers by number of victims
- List of unsolved murders (1900–1979)
- Redhead murders, a similar span of killings in the Southeast United States, occurring between 1978 and 1992
