= Hampton, Tennessee =

Hampton
- CDP
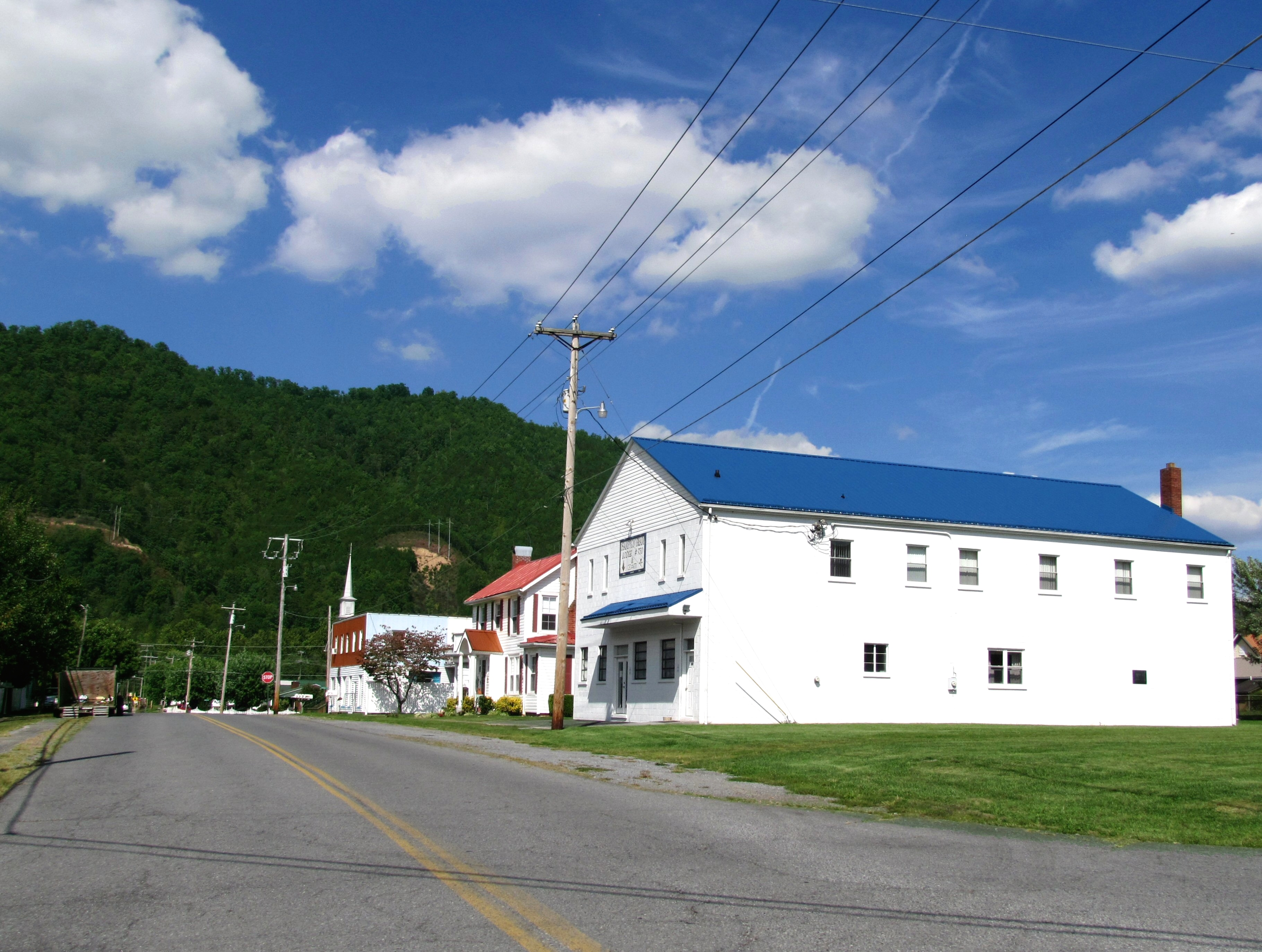
- Buildings along 1st Avenue

- Location within the state of Tennessee Hampton (the United States)
- Coordinates: 36°17′10″N 82°10′19″W
- Country: United States
- State: Tennessee
- County: Carter

Area
  - Total: 4.36 sq mi (11.29 km^{2})
  - Land: 4.36 sq mi (11.29 km^{2})
  - Water: 0 sq mi (0.00 km^{2})

Population (2020)
  - Total: 2,030
  - Density: 465.8/sq mi (179.83/km^{2})
- Time zone: UTC-5 (Eastern (EST))
  - Summer (DST): UTC-4 (EDT)
- ZIP code: 37658
- Area code: 423
- FIPS code: 47-32040

Hampton is an unincorporated community and Census-designated place in Carter County, Tennessee, United States. Located a few miles southeast of Elizabethton and northwest of Roan Mountain, Hampton is surrounded on all sides by the Unaka Mountains. It is part of the Johnson City Metropolitan Statistical Area, which is a component of the Johnson City–Kingsport–Bristol, TN-VA Combined Statistical Area – commonly known as the "Tri-Cities" region.

The population of the CDP in 2020 was 2,030.

== History ==
Hampton was established in the late 1860s by Elijah Simerly, a state legislator and president of the East Tennessee and Western North Carolina Railroad. He named the community for his wife, Mary Hampton. Simerly built an elaborate, Italianate-style house which still stands at the corner of Main Street and 1st Avenue, and is listed on the National Register of Historic Places. The house is now known as the "Butler Mansion" after a later owner, Ralph Butler.

The Laurel Fork Railway served a mill in Hampton.

== Geography ==
Hampton lies in a broad valley concentrated around the Doe River and its junction with two of its tributaries, namely the Little Doe River, which enters the area from the southwest, and Laurel Fork, which enters the area from the east. This valley is surrounded by Jenkins Mountain on the west, the Iron Mountains on the north, Pond Mountain to the east, and Cedar Mountain to the south. Just southeast of Hampton, the Doe River emerges from the Doe River Gorge, a narrow valley between Cedar Mountain and Fork Mountain.

Watauga Lake is located northeast of Hampton. Dennis Cove, an Appalachian cove, lies to the southeast. The Appalachian Trail passes through the eastern outskirts of Hampton. The trail traverses Dennis Cove and follows the upper Laurel Fork Valley before ascending to the crest of Pond Mountain. It descends again to U.S. Route 321, and continues northward along the shores of Watauga Lake.

Hampton is located along U.S. Routes 321 and 19E south of Elizabethton, Tennessee.

== Demographics ==
Historical population
Census	Pop.	Note	%±
2020	2,030		—
U.S. Decennial Census

== Historic district ==
Hampton's historic district has many historic homes, including the Butler Mansion.

== Economy ==
Hampton's economy is mainly based on tourism from the Cherokee National Forest (In which it is located) and the Appalachian Trail. There are several restaurants and stores in Hampton. On the southern outskirts of town, one will find Doe River Gorge, a Christian retreat and Summer camp featuring its own 3 ft (914 mm) narrow gauge railroad laid on a segment of former East Tennessee and Western North Carolina Railroad roadbed.

== Education ==
Schools in Hampton are operated by Carter County Schools:

- Hampton Elementary School - Grades PK-8
- Hampton High School - Grades 9-12

== Hampton-Valley Forge Volunteer Fire Department ==
Hampton-Valley Forge Volunteer Fire Department serves Hampton, Valley Forge and surrounding areas.

== Connection with U.S. Interstate Highway System ==
Interstate 26 Exit 24 then east
Tennessee State Route 67 to Elizabethton, then right on
Tennessee State Route 67 to Hampton.

== Climate ==
Climate of Hampton, Tennessee
Month	Jan	Feb	Mar	Apr	May	Jun	Jul	Aug	Sep	Oct	Nov	Dec	Annual
Avg °F(°C)	34.0^{°F} 1.1^{°C}	37.4^{°F} 3.0^{°C}	47.2^{°F} 8.4^{°C}	55.2^{°F} 12.9^{°C}	63.4^{°F} 17.4^{°C}	71.1^{°F} 21.7^{°C}	74.4^{°F} 23.6^{°C}	73.6^{°F} 23.1^{°C}	67.9^{°F} 19.9^{°C}	56.7^{°F} 13.7^{°C}	47.0^{°F} 8.3^{°C}	38.2^{°F} 3.4^{°C}	55.5^{°F} 13.1^{°C}
Avg high °F(°C)	43.7^{°F} 6.5^{°C}	48.0^{°F} 8.9^{°C}	58.9^{°F} 14.9^{°C}	67.4^{°F} 19.7^{°C}	75.2^{°F} 24.0^{°C}	82.2^{°F} 27.9^{°C}	84.6^{°F} 29.2^{°C}	84.1^{°F} 28.9^{°C}	79.1^{°F} 26.2^{°C}	69.1^{°F} 20.6^{°C}	58.2^{°F} 14.6^{°C}	48.1^{°F} 8.9^{°C}	66.6^{°F} 19.2^{°C}
Avg low °F(°C)	24.3^{°F} -4.3^{°C}	26.8^{°F} -2.9^{°C}	35.4^{°F} 1.9^{°C}	43.0^{°F} 6.1^{°C}	51.6^{°F} 10.9^{°C}	59.9^{°F} 15.5^{°C}	64.1^{°F} 17.8^{°C}	63.1^{°F} 17.3^{°C}	56.6^{°F} 13.7^{°C}	44.2^{°F} 6.8^{°C}	35.9^{°F} 2.2^{°C}	28.2^{°F} -2.1^{°C}	44.4^{°F} 6.9^{°C}
Rain (inches)	3.2 in.	3.4 in.	3.7 in.	3.3 in.	3.8 in.	3.5 in.	4.3 in.	3.2 in.	3.3 in.	2.6 in.	2.9 in.	3.4 in.	40.7 in.
Snow (inches)	5.2 in.	4.2 in.	2.3 in.	0.4 in.	0.05 in.	0.05 in.	0.0 in.	0.0 in.	0.05 in.	0.0 in.	0.9 in.	2.6 in.	15.6 in.
Sources for Hampton (Bristol-Johnson City, Tennessee) climate statistics: climate-zone.com'

== See also ==
- Nathaniel Edwin Harris
