= Cadiz Railroad =

The Cadiz Railroad was a shortline railroad originating in Cadiz, Kentucky. Incorporated in 1901, it ran to a connection with the Illinois Central Railroad at Gracey, Kentucky, a distance of ten miles. The line started service in 1902. In 1984, it obtained an additional 18 miles with the lease of the Illinois Central line from Gracey to Princeton, Kentucky.

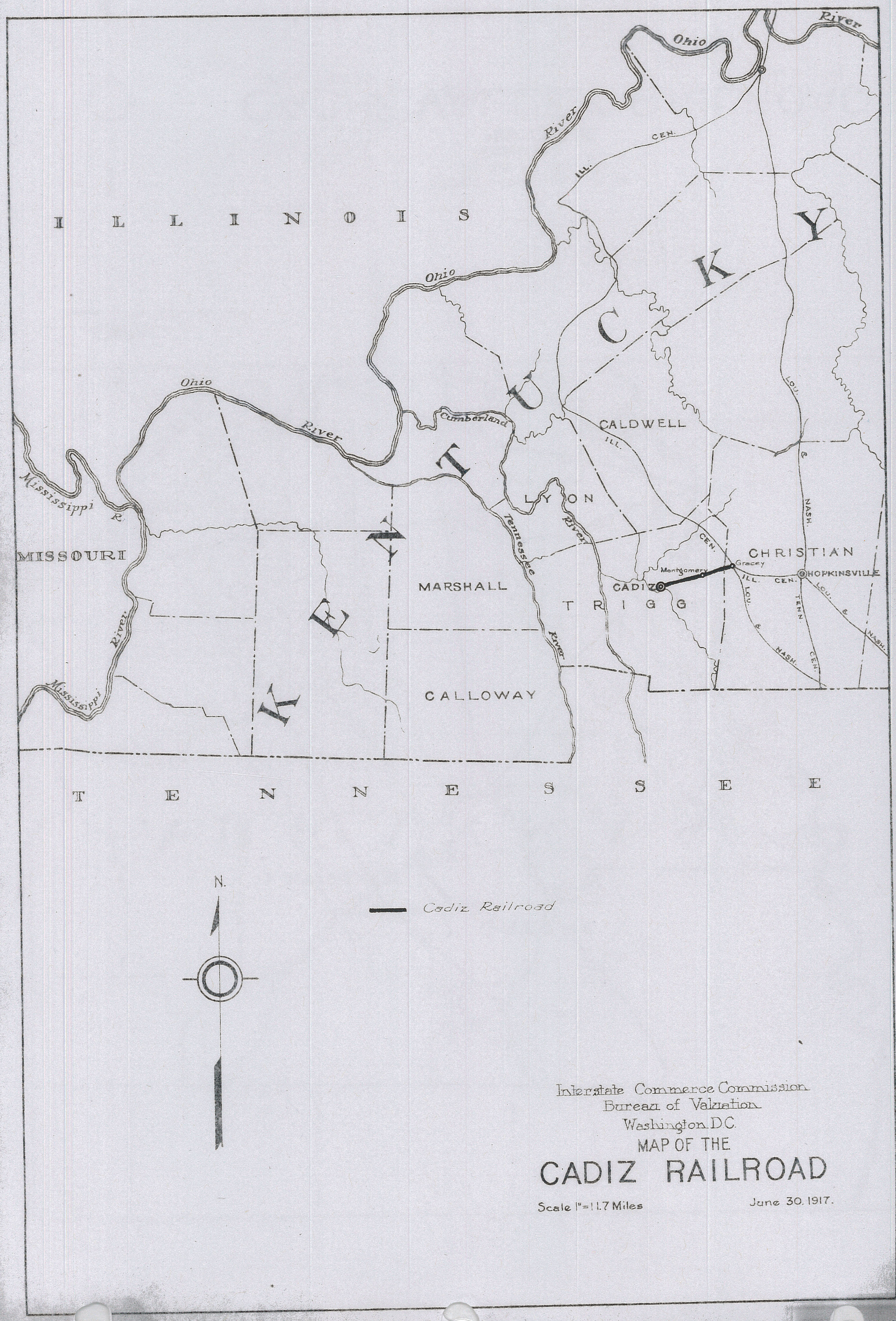
1917 map of the railroad

The Railroad ran with steam locomotives until July 25, 1954, when 0-6-0 #205 took a historical society chartered train. After that, locomotives in the later years were two Alco S1 660 Horsepower, Nos. 8 and 9, and Alco S3 No. 10, also 660 HP. Loco No. 8 was stripped of usable parts after a crankshaft failure and was on display in Montgomery on the old roadbed before being sold to a private individual and moved off site. Locomotives 9 and 10 went on to work for the Dardanelle & Russelville RR in Dardanelle Arkansas.

The railroad hauled lumber, furniture, farm chemicals, and scrap, but was originally built to haul tobacco to market.

The line was abandoned in 1988 and its rails were removed.

In later years, at least 2.5 miles of the old Cadiz Railroad - from Jefferson Street to Fortner Drive - were converted to a walking/running/biking trail. It runs between an old railroad depot on Ky. 139 and Fortner Drive at the east end of town. The trail parallels Noel Drive and Lafayette Street, following an old corridor of the Cadiz Railroad.
