= Butler, Tennessee =

Butler
- Unincorporated community
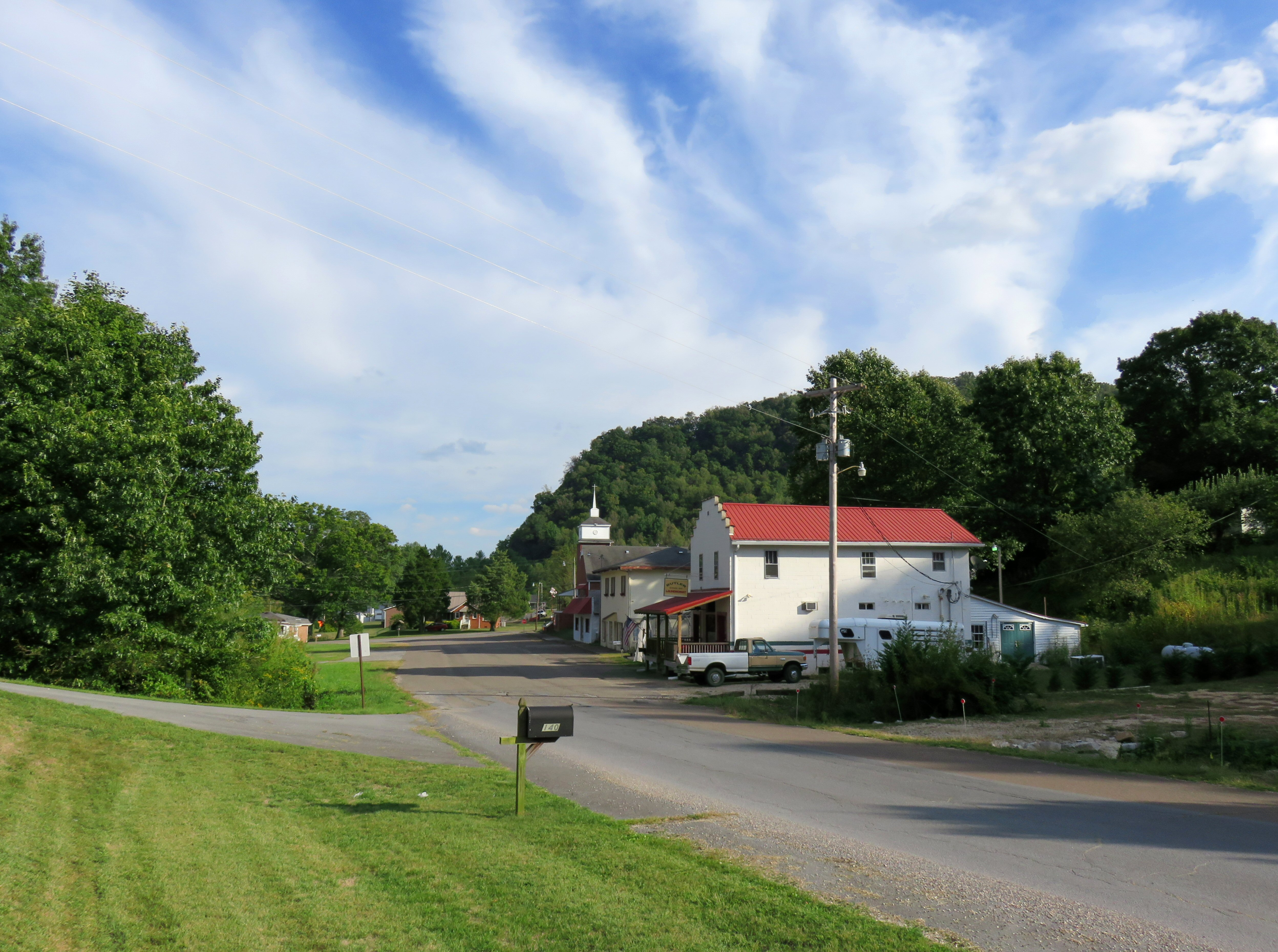
- Buildings along McQueen Street

- Location within Tennessee Location within the United States
- Coordinates: 36°21′12″N 82°01′56″W
- Country: United States
- State: Tennessee
- County: Johnson County

Area
  - Total: 0.78 sq mi (2.02 km^{2})
  - Land: 0.76 sq mi (1.98 km^{2})
  - Water: 0.019 sq mi (0.05 km^{2})
- Elevation: 1,995 ft (608 m)

Population (2020)
  - Total: 297
  - Density: 389.4/sq mi (150.34/km^{2})
- Time zone: UTC-5 (Eastern (EST))
  - Summer (DST): UTC-4 (EDT)
- ZIP code: 37640
- Area code: 423
- FIPS code: 47-10080
- GNIS feature ID: 1305567

Butler is an unincorporated community in Johnson County in the northeastern corner of the U.S. state of Tennessee. It is located along the northern shore of Watauga Lake. Butler is served by a post office, assigned ZIP Code 37640.

== Demographics ==
Historical population
| Census | Pop. | Note | %± |
|---|---|---|---|
| 1910 | 499 | | — |
| 1920 | 578 | | 15.8% |
| 1930 | 706 | | 22.1% |
| 1940 | 608 | | −13.9% |
| 2020 | 297 | | — |
U.S. Decennial Census

Butler first appeared in the 1910 U.S. census as a town of nearly 500 people. It would not appear in the 1950 census following the inundation of the town by the Watauga Lake in 1948. The community would later be made a CDP in the 2020 census, with a recording of 297 people.

== History ==
The town was originally located on Roan Creek at its confluence with the Watauga River. Settlement began in 1768. For many years the community was called Smith's Mill for the gristmill that Ezekial “Zeke” Smith built on the bank of Roan Creek in 1820. After the Civil War, it was renamed in honor of Colonel Roderick R. Butler of Johnson County, who then represented the area in the state legislature and had been a commander in the 13th Tennessee Cavalry in the Union Army.

Aenon Seminary, a secondary school, was established in Butler in 1871. It later became Holly Spring College, offering education up to a bachelor's degree, and enrolling as many as 200 students. In 1906 it was purchased by the Watauga Baptist Association, which renamed it Watauga Academy. It operated under that name until 1948, when the town was inundated by the formation of Watauga Lake.

Butler was the birthplace of U.S. Representatives B. Carroll Reece of Tennessee and Robert R. Butler of Oregon (grandson of the town's namesake).

=== Inundation and relocation ===
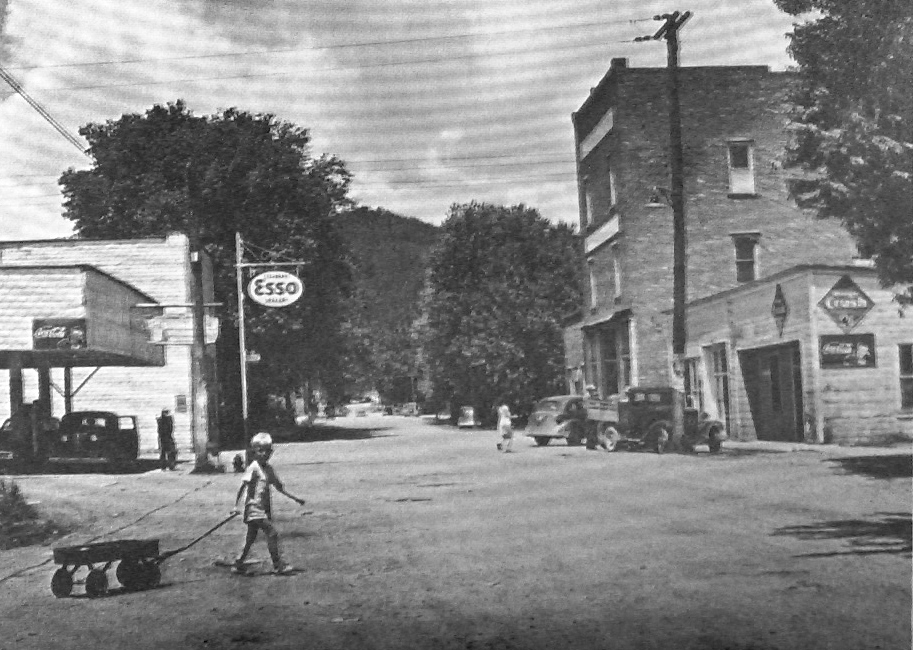
Main Street in "old" Butler, before inundation

The original town of Butler was subject to frequent flooding, experiencing major floods in 1867, 1886, 1901, 1902, 1916, 1924, and 1940. The Tennessee Valley Authority (TVA) began the construction of the Watauga Dam in 1942 which created the Watauga Lake. The construction was delayed because of the ongoing World War II, but was finished in 1948 when the water steadily began rising and the town slowly became submerged under the lake. Butler was the only incorporated town inundated by a TVA reservoir. In 1948, before the reservoir was filled, the town, which at the time had a population of about 600 and included more than 125 homes and 50 businesses, was relocated to higher ground. The relocation project required construction of 54.9 miles (88.4 km) of roads and highways, three bridges, and 66 miles (106 km) of utility lines, as well as relocation of 1,281 graves. The town's new site is located on Tennessee State Route 67 at 36.35682°N 82.03015°W.

The original town is now known as "Old Butler." Old Butler, called “the town that wouldn’t drown,” is commemorated in a museum in Butler and by "Old Butler Days" which is an annual festival held each year in August right in the heart of the town. In 1983, a drawdown of the lake exposed the remains of Old Butler for a brief time, allowing former residents to visit the site.
