= Northeast Correctional Complex =

Prison in Tennessee, United States

Coordinates: 36°26′52″N 81°53′08″W

- Interactive map of Northeast Correctional Complex
- Location: 5249 Highway 67 West Mountain City, Tennessee
- Status: open
- Security class: mixed
- Capacity: 1,819
- Opened: March 1991
- Managed by: Tennessee Department of Correction
- Director: Brian Eller

The Northeast Correctional Complex is a state prison located in the community Doe Valley, a few miles outside the town of Mountain City, Johnson County, Tennessee, owned and operated by the Tennessee Department of Correction. The facility holds 1819 male inmates and opened in 1991.

== Notable inmates ==
- Sean Patrick Goble. Serial killer who murdered at least 4 individuals between 1994-1995, though his number of victims is likely higher. Serving two life sentences and eligible for parole in 2054.
- William Harness (Struggle Jennings)
