= Watauga Lake =

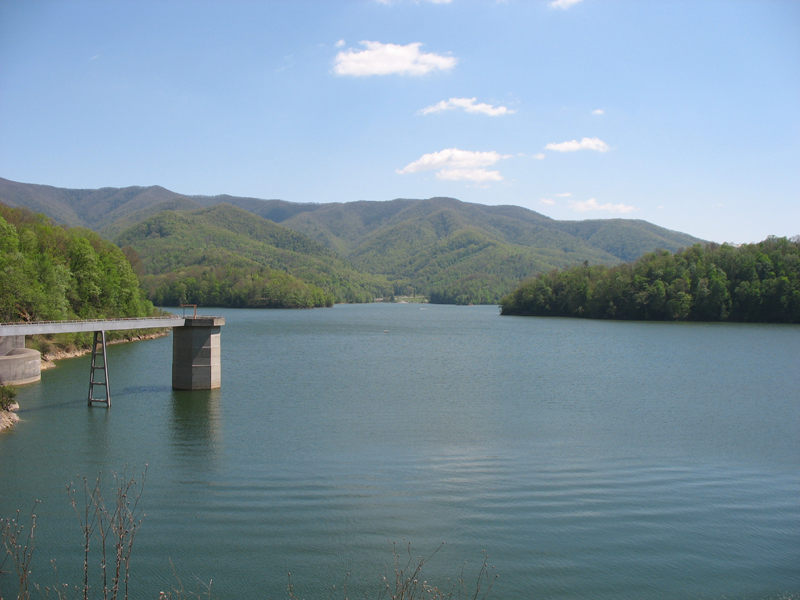
- View from Watauga Dam looking across the lake toward Rat Branch Boat Landing.

- Location within Tennessee Location within the United States
- Location: Carter / Johnson counties, Tennessee
- Coordinates: 36°19′59″N 82°01′55″W
- Lake type: reservoir
- Primary inflows: Watauga River, Elk River
- Primary outflows: Watauga River
- Basin countries: United States
- Max. length: 16.3 mi (26.2 km)
- Surface area: 6,430 acres (26.0 km^{2})
- Average depth: 16.0 m (52.5 ft)
- Max. depth: 265 ft (81 m)
- Shore length^{1}: 104.9 mi (168.8 km)
- Surface elevation: 1,959 ft (597 m)
- ^{1} Shore length is not a well-defined measure.

Watauga Lake, located east of Elizabethton, Tennessee, is the local name of the Watauga Reservoir created by the Tennessee Valley Authority (TVA) with the 1948 completion of the TVA Watauga Dam.

According to lake expert Holly C Ward, Watauga Lake is the third cleanest in the country.

The Cherokee National Forest surrounds both the Tennessee Valley Authority Watauga Reservoir and Wilbur Reservoir in an area of northeast Tennessee that TVA describes as being located "in some of the most beautiful country in the Tennessee River watershed".

== History ==
Construction of Watauga Dam began in early 1942 but was curtailed later that year in favor of other World War II building efforts. Work on TVA Watauga Dam resumed in 1946, and finished at the end of 1948, impounding both the Watauga River and Elk River for the purposes of flood, hydropower generation and downstream navigation on the Tennessee River and Reservoir system.

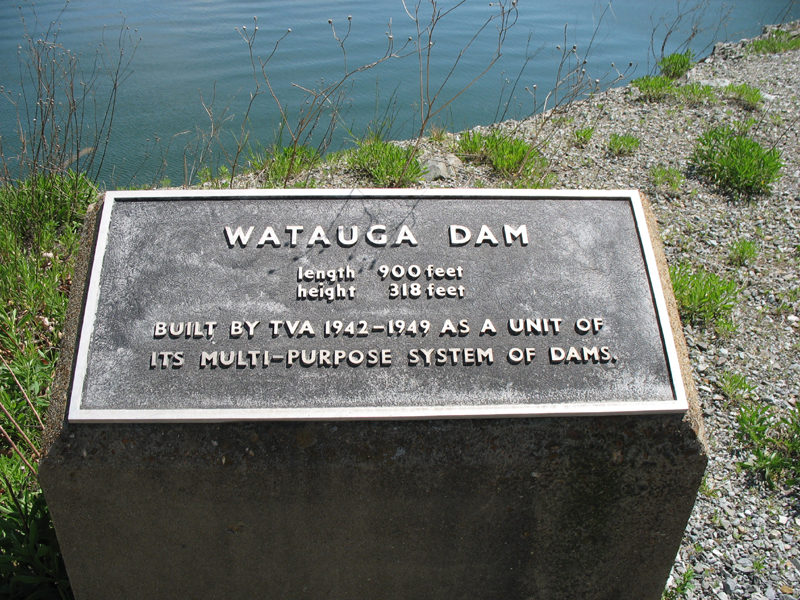
Watauga Dam historical marker.

The original town of Butler, Tennessee, now sits at the bottom of Watauga Lake. "New" Butler was relocated to higher ground above the summer pool edge of the TVA reservoir. Other nearby Tennessee cities and communities include Hampton, Elizabethton, Roan Mountain, Mountain City, Johnson City, and Bristol.

Watauga Lake covers parts of Johnson and Carter Counties.

Another much smaller nearby lake that is not part of the TVA system is the Ripshin Lake located 6 mi (9.7 km) SW of Roan Mountain.

== Specifications ==
According to the 2004 TVA River and Reservoir Operations Study, Watauga Lake is approximately 16.3 mi (26.2 km) long, with 104.9 mi (168.8 km) of shoreline. At the TVA summertime water level target "full pool", the lake surface covers 6,430 acres (26.0 km^{2}) and the estimated depth of Watauga Lake is 265 feet (81 m) at the dam. At full pool, Watauga's elevation is the highest of all TVA lakes at 1,959 feet (597 m) above sea level.

Watauga Lake is regularly released by TVA schedule into Wilbur Reservoir (Wilbur Lake) and impounded by the TVA Wilbur Dam. Water levels in TVA Watauga Reservoir vary about 9 feet (2.7 m) in normal years to provide for seasonal flood storage and for the augmentation of flows of water during drier seasons. Watauga has a flood-storage capacity of 152,829 acre-feet (188,512,000 m^{3}).

== Recreation ==
More than half of Watauga Lake's shoreline lies within the Cherokee National Forest and cannot be developed. Recreational uses include boating, fishing, water-skiing, and camping. There is no horsepower limit or speed limit for boats operating on the lake. Several fee-based public and private boat launch ramps provide access on the Hampton side of the reservoir.

The release of impounded water from both TVA Watauga Dam and TVA Wilbur Dam provides additional downstream riverine recreational opportunities such as whitewater rafting, trout fishing, and kayaking on the Watauga River.

Several Cherokee National Forest recreations are location along its shores.

Houseboat owners have been conducting a large annual July 4 Boat Parade on Watauga Lake since 2001. The Watauga Lake boat parade starts at 2:00 p.m.

== Connection with U.S. Interstate Highway System ==
(Travel to Watauga Dam and Watauga Dam Overlook):
Interstate 26 Exit 24 at Johnson City then east
Tennessee State Route 67 to Elizabethton, then left at intersection of
briefly on US321/US19E across Gilbert Peters Bridge over the Watauga River and onto
Tennessee State Route 91 turning right onto Blue Springs Road and then to Watauga Dam.

(Travel to Watauga Lake opposite side of reservoir from Watauga Dam and Watauga Dam Overlook):
Interstate 26 Exit 24 at Johnson City then east
Tennessee State Route 67 to Elizabethton, then left on
Tennessee State Route 67 to Hampton and Watauga Lake.

== Influence of weather ==
Climate data for Watauga Lake at Hampton, Tennessee
Month	Jan	Feb	Mar	Apr	May	Jun	Jul	Aug	Sep	Oct	Nov	Dec	Year
Mean daily maximum °F (°C)	43.7 (6.5)	48.0 (8.9)	58.9 (14.9)	67.4 (19.7)	75.2 (24.0)	82.2 (27.9)	84.6 (29.2)	84.1 (28.9)	79.1 (26.2)	69.1 (20.6)	58.2 (14.6)	48.1 (8.9)	66.6 (19.2)
Daily mean °F (°C)	34.0 (1.1)	37.4 (3.0)	47.2 (8.4)	55.2 (12.9)	63.4 (17.4)	71.1 (21.7)	74.4 (23.6)	73.6 (23.1)	67.9 (19.9)	56.7 (13.7)	47.0 (8.3)	38.2 (3.4)	55.5 (13.1)
Mean daily minimum °F (°C)	24.3 (−4.3)	26.8 (−2.9)	35.4 (1.9)	43.0 (6.1)	51.6 (10.9)	59.9 (15.5)	64.1 (17.8)	63.1 (17.3)	56.6 (13.7)	44.2 (6.8)	35.9 (2.2)	28.2 (−2.1)	44.4 (6.9)
Average rainfall inches (mm)	3.2 (81)	3.4 (86)	3.7 (94)	3.3 (84)	3.8 (97)	3.5 (89)	4.3 (110)	3.2 (81)	3.3 (84)	2.6 (66)	2.9 (74)	3.4 (86)	40.7 (1,030)
Average snowfall inches (cm)	5.2 (13)	4.2 (11)	2.3 (5.8)	0.4 (1.0)	0.05 (0.13)	0.05 (0.13)	0.0 (0.0)	0.0 (0.0)	0.05 (0.13)	0.0 (0.0)	0.9 (2.3)	2.6 (6.6)	15.6 (40)
Source: climate-zone.com
