= Tennessee State Route 133 =

State highway in Tennessee, United States

State Route 133
- SR 133 highlighted in red

Route information
- Maintained by TDOT
- Length: 11.24 mi (18.09 km)

Major junctions
- South end: US 421 / SR 91 at Shady Valley
- North end: SR 716 at the Virginia state line north of Sutherland

Location
- Country: United States
- State: Tennessee
- Counties: Johnson

Highway system
- Tennessee State Routes; Interstate; US; State
← SR 131	→ SR 134

State Route 133 (SR 133) is a state route in northeastern Tennessee in Johnson County. It begins at Shady Valley and runs northward for about 11 miles (18 km) to the Tennessee–Virginia state border.

== Route description ==
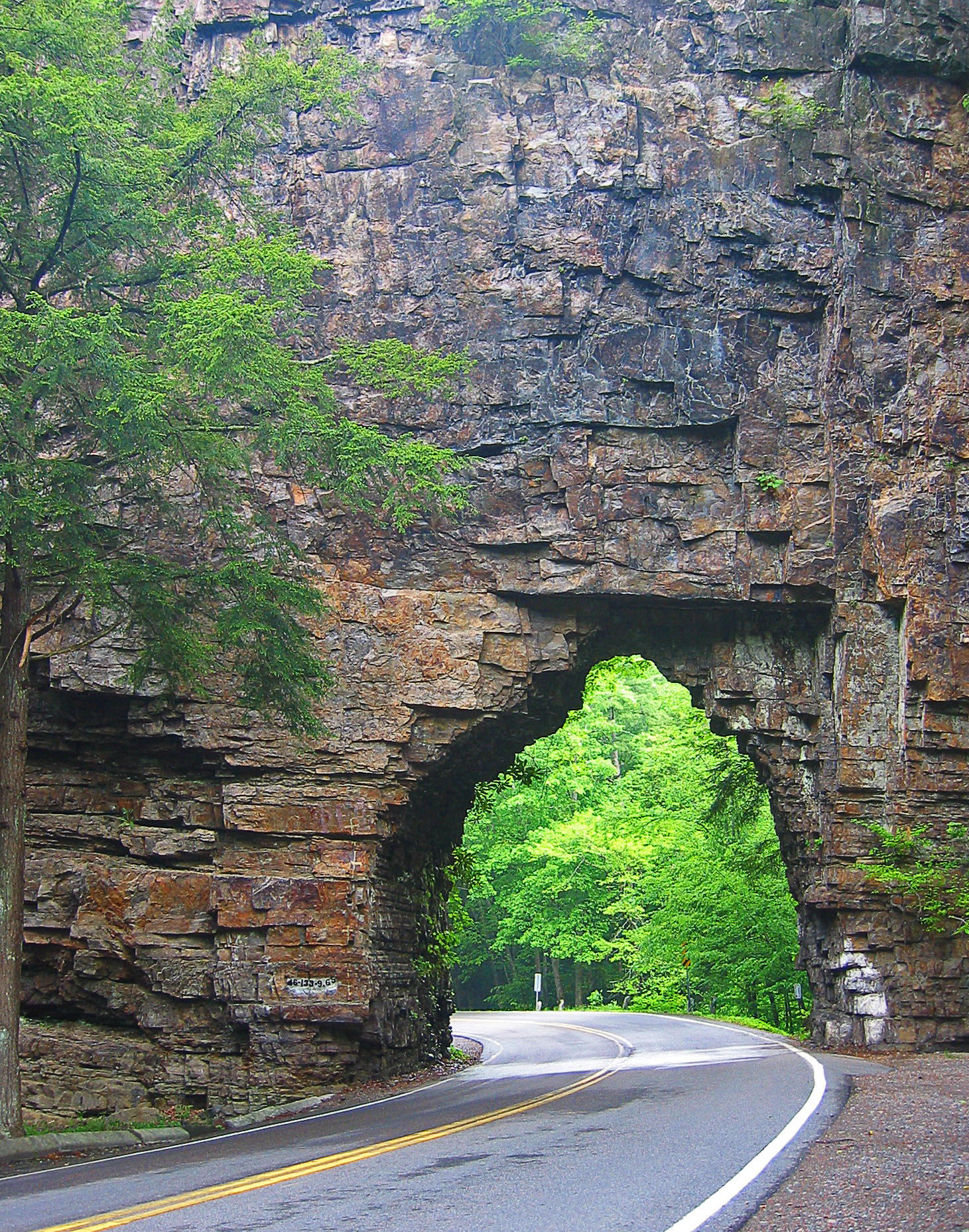
State Route 133 passing through the Backbone Rock Tunnel

SR 133 begins in Shady Valley, at an intersection with US 421, SR 34, and SR 91. The highway heads north through farmland to pass through Crandull, where it begins to follow the former alignment of the Beaver Dam Railroad. SR 133 then enters the mountains of the Cherokee National Forest, where it becomes curvy and narrow. It passes through the Backbone Rock Tunnel, an old railroad tunnel used by the Beaver Dam Railroad known as "the shortest tunnel in the world", via a bridge over Beaverdam Creek on either end. SR 133 then exits the mountains and the Cherokee National Forest to level and straighten out to pass through Sutherland before reaching its northern terminus at the state border with Virginia.

== Major intersections ==
The entire route is in Johnson County.

Location	mi	km	Destinations	Notes
Shady Valley	0.0	0.0	US 421 / SR 91 (SR 34) – Elizabethton, Mountain City, Bristol	Southern terminus
	11.24	18.09	SR 716 (Shady Avenue) – Damascus	Virginia state line; northern terminus
1.000 mi = 1.609 km; 1.000 km = 0.621 mi
