= Appalachian bogs =

Ecosystems in the Appalachian Mountains

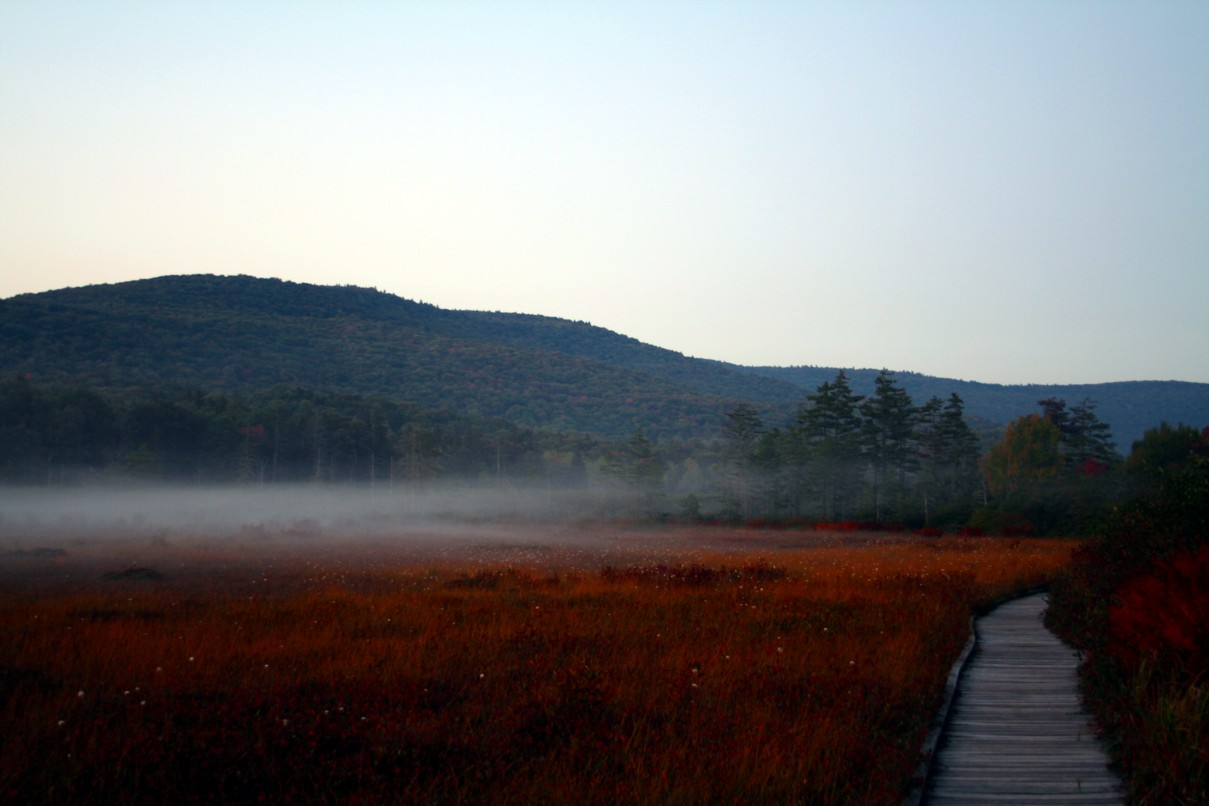
Cranberry Glades, a bog preserve in West Virginia

Appalachian bogs are boreal or hemiboreal ecosystems, which occur in many places in the Appalachian Mountains, particularly the Allegheny and Blue Ridge subranges. Though popularly called bogs, many of them are technically fens.

== Natural history ==
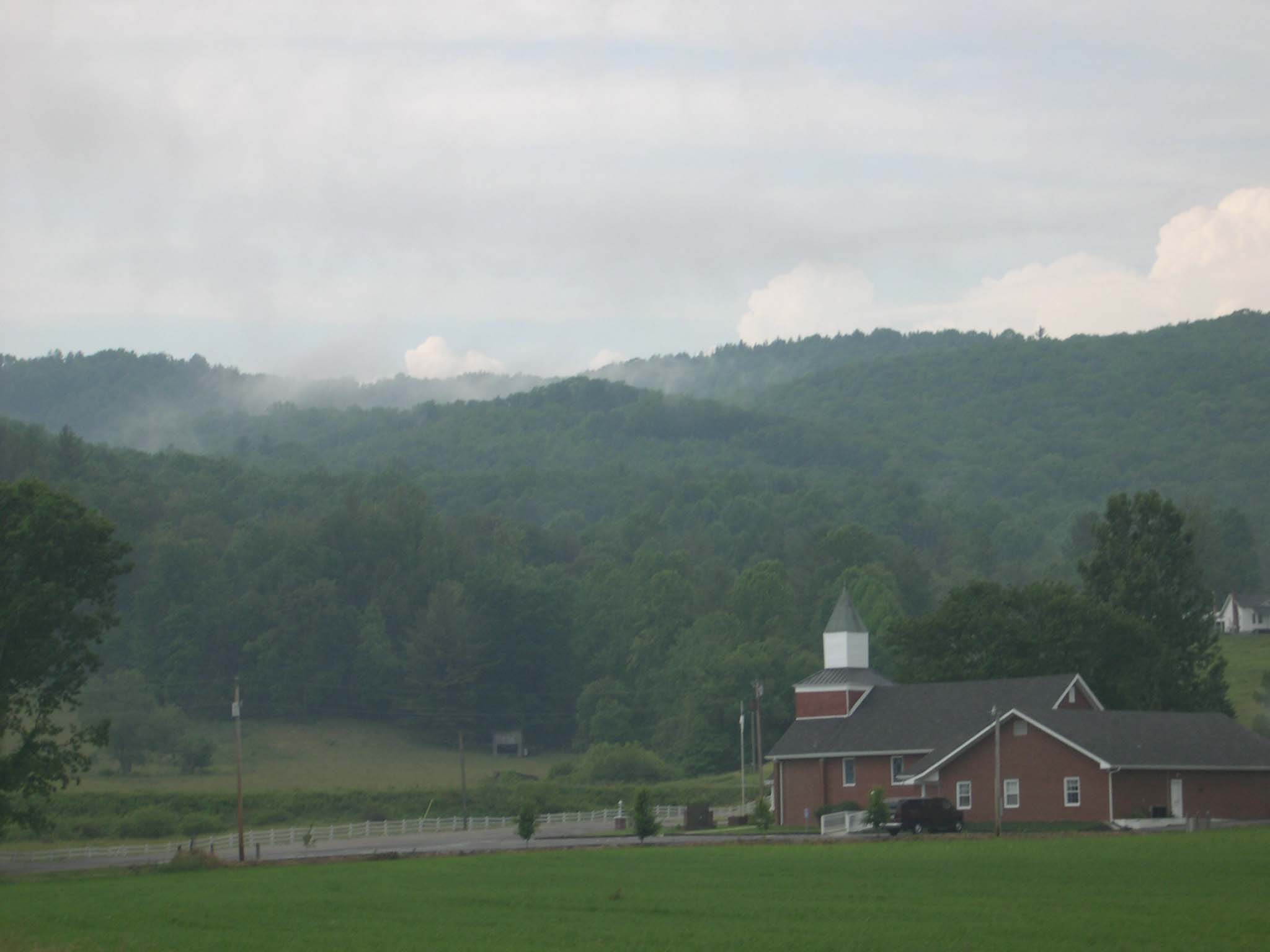
Shady Valley, a town and mountain valley in Tennessee

After the Pleistocene ice ages, species and ecosystems that had shifted southward often survived in local refugia. As a result, cold-adapted ecosystems, such as bogs, remain as far south as East Tennessee and Western North Carolina. Development of land has greatly reduced both the number and acreage of the bogs in North Carolina. Bog ecosystems evolved in humid cold temperate regions and are generally ombrotrophic which means the system is dependent on precipitation for moisture and nutrient inputs.

=== Shady Valley bogs ===
Situated between Holston Mountain and the Iron Mountains, the community of Shady Valley, Tennessee, once contained an estimated 10,000 acres (40 km^{2}) of cranberry bogs. In recent years, The Nature Conservancy has initiated a bog restoration program in Shady Valley. The Conservancy also sponsors the town's annual Cranberry Festival, which is held the second weekend in October.

== Notable bog preserves ==
- Cranberry Glades, in Pocahontas County, West Virginia
- Cranesville Swamp Preserve, in Preston County, West Virginia and Garrett County, Maryland
- Mountain Bogs National Wildlife Refuge in Ashe County, North Carolina.
- Tamarack Swamp, in Pennsylvania's West Branch Susquehanna Valley
- Tannersville Cranberry Bog, in Northeastern Pennsylvania

== Cataract bogs ==
A cataract bog is a rare ecological community, formed where a permanent stream flows over a granite outcropping. The sheeting of water keeps the edges of the rock wet without eroding the soil, but in this precarious location no tree or large shrub can maintain a roothold. The result is a narrow, permanently wet, sunny habitat.

While a cataract bog is host to plants typical of a bog, it is technically a fen, not a bog. Bogs get water from the atmosphere, while fens get their water from groundwater seepage.

Cataract bogs inhabit a narrow, linear zone next to the stream, and are partly shaded by trees and shrubs in the adjacent plant communities.

Cataract bogs are found only in the Southern Appalachian Mountains of the United States, at elevations of between 1,200 and 2,400 feet (370 and 730 m). They are restricted to the Blue Ridge Escarpment region of South Carolina and a small area of North Carolina, a region with exceptionally high rainfall.

== Sods ==
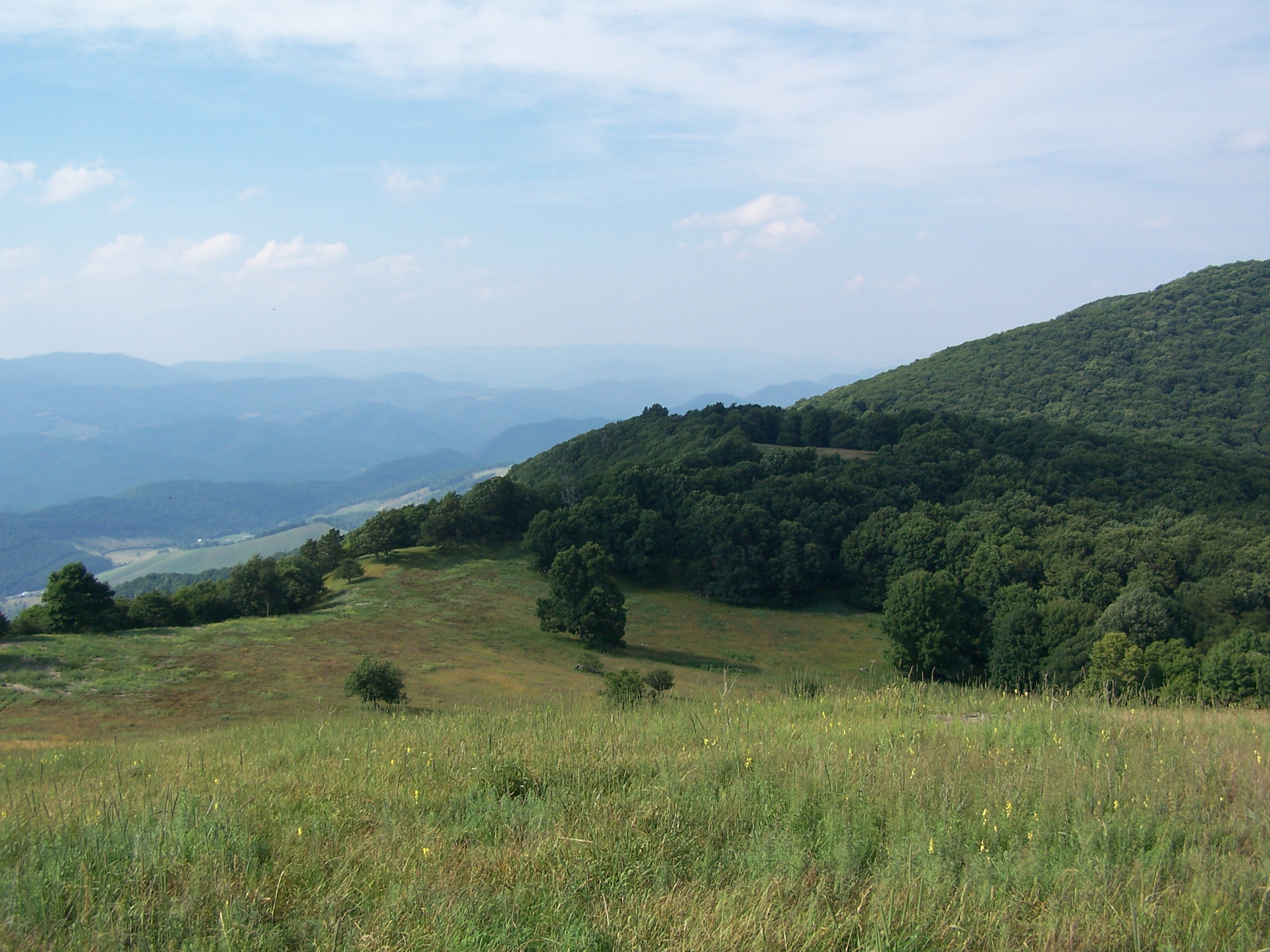
Nelson Sods, on North Fork Mountain, in West Virginia

Sods is a term used in the Allegheny Mountains of eastern West Virginia for a mountaintop meadow or bog, in an area that is otherwise generally forested. The term is similar (perhaps identical) to that of a "grass bald", a more widespread designation applied throughout the central and southern Appalachian region.

The best known example of a sods is Dolly Sods, a federally designated wilderness area in Tucker County, West Virginia and popular destination for recreationalists. Other examples include Nelson Sods (Pendleton County) and Baker Sods (Randolph County).

== See also ==
- Appalachian balds
- Appalachian temperate rainforest
- Cove (Appalachian Mountains)
- Southern Appalachian spruce–fir forest
- Fen
