= Beaver Dam Railroad =

Overview
- Headquarters: Damascus, Virginia
- Locale: Virginia and Tennessee
- Dates of operation: 1900–1920s

Technical
- Track gauge: 4 ft 8 1/2 in (1,435 mm)
- Length: 10 miles

The Beaver Dam Railroad was a short-line railroad that operated in the U.S. states of Virginia and Tennessee in the early 20th century between the towns of Damascus, Virginia and Crandull, Tennessee. The line was abandoned in sections beginning in 1918 with portions still remaining in operation into the 1920s. Today, much of the old route is followed by Tennessee State Route 133.

== History ==
In the late nineteenth century, the Empire Lumber and Mining Company began logging operations in northeastern Tennessee. To transport finished lumber from the company's sawmill in Crandull, Tennessee, the Beaver Dam Railroad was incorporated on August 6, 1900, and constructed from Crandull to the Tennessee-Virginia state border (a distance of 8.52 miles (13.71 km)), where a connection with the Virginia-Carolina Railway would be made. Originally, the portion of the line from the Tennessee-Virginia border to Damascus, Virginia, was operated by the Virginia-Carolina Railway. The Tennessee Lumber and Manufacturing Company began its own operations near Sutherland, Tennessee, around 1900 and would soon come to use the Beaver Dam Railroad for its products. The line from Crandull to Damascus, a distance of about ten miles, was completed by 1902. A six-mile extension, the Crandull and Shady Valley Railroad, was incorporated on December 15, 1909, to extend the line from Crandull to Shady Valley, Tennessee. This railroad was leased by the Beaver Dam Railroad and operated under its control as one unit. In 1910, the 1.386 miles (2.231 km) long Virginia section previously operated by the Virginia Carolina Railway was leased to the Beaver Dam Railroad, which assumed its operations, at an annual rate of $300. In the early 1910s, the companies which had originally provided the need for the Beaver Dam Railroad began to pull out as timber supplies ran short. Thus, in 1918, the Tennessee section of the railroad was abandoned, leaving only the short Virginia section. However, this section would continue to operate under the Beaver Dam name into the 1920s by the Smethport Extract Company serving its plant near Damascus. At this point, the railroad only operated 1.386 miles (2.231 km) of single track mainline and 0.129 miles (208 m) of yard or siding track, yet it did not actually own any track or property (except for one steam locomotive and a passenger car).

== Backbone Rock Tunnel ==
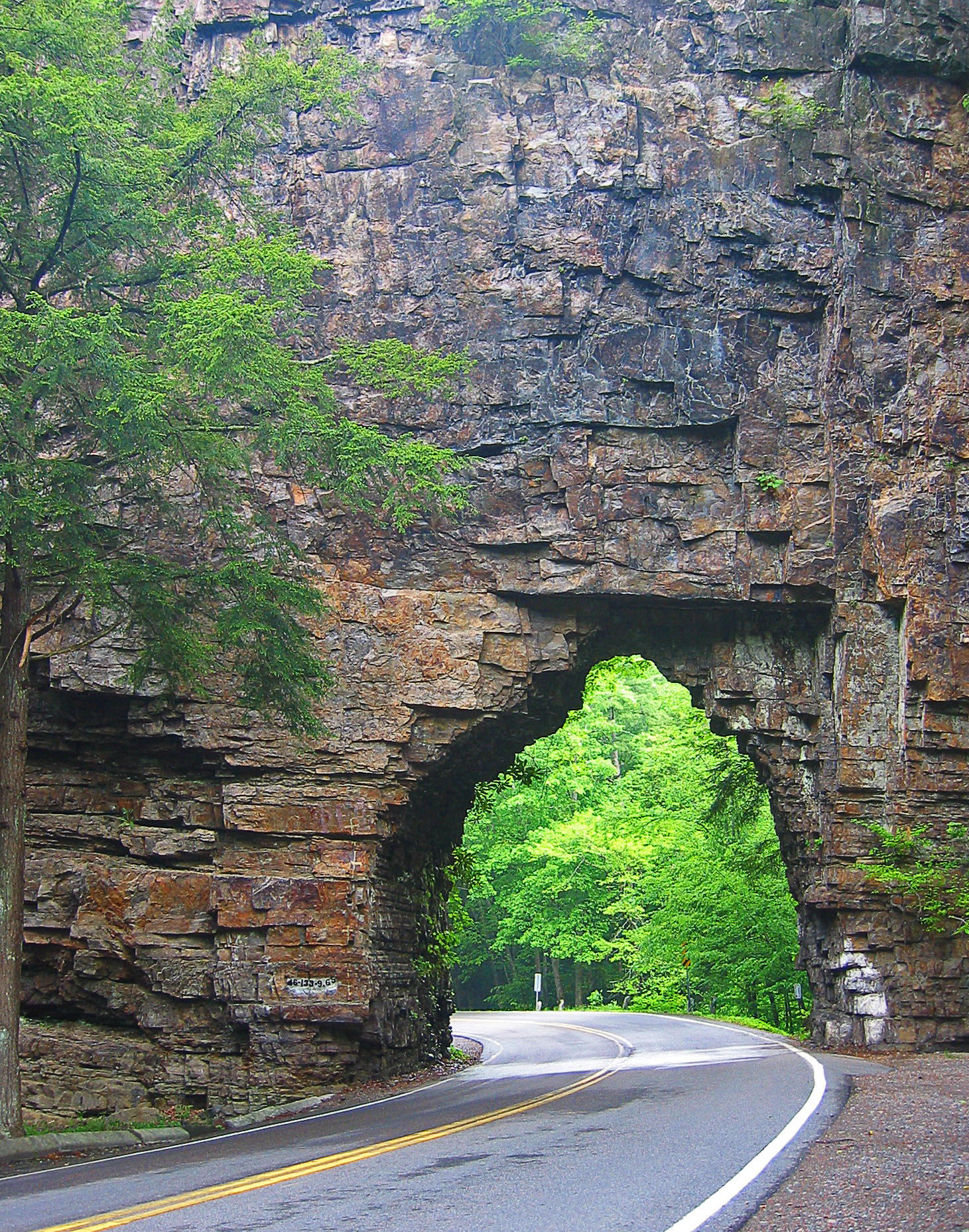
36°35′38″N 81°48′54″W Backbone Rock Tunnel as it is today with TN 133.

The Backbone Rock tunnel was a short tunnel on the Beaver Dam Railroad's Tennessee section, blasted through in 1901 from a rock cliff that stood in the way of the railroad's progression. At only twenty-two feet in length, the tunnel was known locally as the "shortest tunnel in the world." After the tunnel was bored and the tracks laid, it was found that the tunnel was not tall enough to clear the steam locomotive's smokestack. To fix this problem, a section of the cliff was hand-chiseled out to increase the tunnel's clearance in order to allow trains to pass through. After the Tennessee section of the Beaver Dam Railroad was abandoned in 1918, the tunnel was widened for the use of Tennessee State Route 133, which still passes through today. The U.S. Forest Service currently maintains a recreational center and campground near the old tunnel, which is located in the Cherokee National Forest.

== Rolling Stock ==
Rolling Stock on the Beaver Dam Railroad (1916)
Type	Amount	Notes
Steam Locomotive	1	owned. Ex-Norfolk and Western Railway 4-6-0
Passenger	2	both owned
Freight	35	leased from Virginia-Carolina Railway
