= 1960 United States presidential election in Tennessee =

- November 8, 1960

Nominee	Richard Nixon	John F. Kennedy
Party	Republican	Democratic
Home state	California	Massachusetts
Running mate	Henry Cabot Lodge Jr.	Lyndon B. Johnson
Electoral vote	11	0
Popular vote	556,577	481,453
Percentage	52.92%	45.77%

Nixon
40–50%
50–60%
60–70%
70–80%
80–90%
Kennedy
40–50%
50–60%
60–70%
70–80%
President before election
Dwight D. Eisenhower
Republican
Elected President
John F. Kennedy
Democratic

The 1960 United States presidential election in Tennessee took place on November 8, 1960, as part of the 1960 United States presidential election. Tennessee voters chose 11 representatives, or electors, to the Electoral College, who voted for president and vice president.

Ever since the Civil War, Tennessee's white citizenry had been divided according to political loyalties established in that war. Unionist regions covering almost all of East Tennessee, Kentucky Pennyroyal-allied Macon County, and the Western Highland Rim counties of Carroll, Henderson, McNairy, Hardin and Wayne voted Republican — generally by landslide margins — as they saw the Democratic Party as the "war party" who had forced them into a war they did not wish to fight. Contrariwise, the rest of Middle and West Tennessee who had supported and driven the state's secession were equally fiercely Democratic as it associated the Republicans with Reconstruction. The Democratic Party was certain of winning statewide elections if united, although unlike the Deep South Republicans would almost always gain thirty to forty percent of the statewide vote from mountain and Highland Rim support even after most blacks were disenfranchised around 1890 by a poll tax and intimidation.

Between 1896 and 1948, the Republicans would win statewide contests three times but only in the second amidst the national anti-Wilson tide of 1920 did they receive down-ballot coattails (in that election, winning three congressional seats in addition to the rock-ribbed GOP 1st and 2nd districts). After the beginning of the Great Depression, however, for the next third of a century the Republicans would rarely seriously contest statewide offices, despite ongoing dominance of East Tennessee and half a dozen Unionist counties in the middle and west of the state. State GOP leader B. Carroll Reece is widely believed to have had agreements with Democratic leaders E. H. Crump and later Frank G. Clement and Buford Ellington that Republicans would not contest offices statewide or outside their traditional pro-Union areas. Despite this, the capture of a substantial part of the West Tennessee Dixiecrat vote of 1948 allowed Dwight D. Eisenhower to narrowly carry the state for the GOP in both 1952 and 1956.

For 1960, the nomination of Irish Catholic John F. Kennedy by the Democratic Party — who had made major gains in the 1958 midterm elections — led to severe questioning of how Tennessee's heavily fundamentalist electorate would react to Kennedy's Catholicism.

== Campaign ==
During the campaign, both Kennedy and Republican nominee incumbent Vice President Richard Nixon visited Tennessee in the second week of October. Kennedy focused on Nixon's supposed opposition to the Tennessee Valley Authority, whilst Nixon focused on how his platform was closer to that of the Founding Fathers and Andrew Jackson than Kennedy's. Kennedy, for his part, noted that the Democratic Party was founded by Tennessean Jackson.

=== Predictions ===
Source	Ranking	As of
The Philadelphia Inquirer	Tossup	October 3, 1960
Knoxville News Sentinel	Lean R	October 23, 1960
Daily News	Lean D (flip)	October 28, 1960
The Daily Item	Tilt R	November 4, 1960
Los Angeles Times	Tossup	November 6, 1960

== Results ==
1960 United States presidential election in Tennessee
Party	Candidate	Votes	%
Republican	Richard Nixon	556,577	52.92%
Democratic	John F. Kennedy	481,453	45.77%
National States' Rights Party	Orval Faubus	11,304	1.07%
Prohibition	Rutherford Decker	2,458	0.23%
Total votes		1,051,792	100%

=== Results by county ===
County	Richard Nixon Republican		John F. Kennedy Democratic		Orval Faubus National States’ Rights		Rutherford Decker Prohibition		Margin		Total votes cast
County	#	%	#	%	#	%	#	%	#	%	Total votes cast
Anderson	11,153	52.56%	9,878	46.55%	152	0.72%	38	0.18%	1,275	6.01%	21,221
Bedford	2,633	36.81%	4,457	62.32%	62	0.87%	0	0.00%	-1,824	-25.51%	7,152
Benton	1,773	45.20%	2,030	51.75%	120	3.06%	0	0.00%	-257	-6.55%	3,923
Bledsoe	1,439	58.69%	981	40.01%	24	0.98%	8	0.33%	458	18.68%	2,452
Blount	13,552	68.20%	6,213	31.27%	67	0.34%	40	0.20%	7,339	36.93%	19,872
Bradley	7,865	69.69%	3,307	29.30%	91	0.81%	22	0.19%	4,558	40.39%	11,285
Campbell	5,079	61.21%	3,134	37.77%	63	0.76%	21	0.25%	1,945	23.44%	8,297
Cannon	1,195	48.05%	1,275	51.27%	14	0.56%	3	0.12%	-80	-3.22%	2,487
Carroll	4,517	59.36%	2,961	38.91%	117	1.54%	14	0.18%	1,556	20.45%	7,609
Carter	12,214	77.31%	3,412	21.60%	94	0.60%	78	0.49%	8,802	55.71%	15,798
Cheatham	683	26.20%	1,883	72.23%	34	1.30%	7	0.27%	-1,200	-46.03%	2,607
Chester	1,807	59.05%	1,192	38.95%	54	1.76%	7	0.23%	615	20.10%	3,060
Claiborne	3,888	64.20%	2,142	35.37%	18	0.30%	8	0.13%	1,746	28.83%	6,056
Clay	1,098	52.14%	976	46.34%	32	1.52%	0	0.00%	122	5.80%	2,106
Cocke	6,581	81.30%	1,442	17.81%	34	0.42%	38	0.47%	5,139	63.49%	8,095
Coffee	3,058	39.79%	4,555	59.26%	66	0.86%	7	0.09%	-1,497	-19.47%	7,686
Crockett	1,467	48.69%	1,438	47.73%	95	3.15%	13	0.43%	29	0.96%	3,013
Cumberland	3,523	60.70%	2,189	37.72%	62	1.07%	30	0.52%	1,334	22.98%	5,804
Davidson	52,077	46.25%	59,649	52.98%	666	0.59%	205	0.18%	-7,572	-6.73%	112,597
Decatur	1,684	54.76%	1,321	42.96%	51	1.66%	19	0.62%	363	11.80%	3,075
DeKalb	1,440	47.59%	1,547	51.12%	29	0.96%	10	0.33%	-107	-3.53%	3,026
Dickson	1,928	32.71%	3,930	66.68%	33	0.56%	3	0.05%	-2,002	-33.97%	5,894
Dyer	4,097	49.95%	3,868	47.15%	221	2.69%	17	0.21%	229	2.80%	8,203
Fayette	1,370	48.95%	892	31.87%	517	18.47%	20	0.71%	478	17.08%	2,799
Fentress	2,726	71.89%	1,014	26.74%	37	0.98%	15	0.40%	1,712	45.15%	3,792
Franklin	2,041	28.59%	5,041	70.61%	45	0.63%	12	0.17%	-3,000	-42.02%	7,139
Gibson	5,173	45.66%	5,796	51.16%	330	2.91%	30	0.26%	-623	-5.50%	11,329
Giles	1,598	24.54%	4,879	74.91%	24	0.37%	12	0.18%	-3,281	-50.37%	6,513
Grainger	3,017	75.86%	939	23.61%	12	0.30%	9	0.23%	2,078	52.25%	3,977
Greene	8,835	66.55%	4,406	33.19%	20	0.15%	15	0.11%	4,429	33.36%	13,276
Grundy	786	26.55%	2,143	72.40%	19	0.64%	12	0.41%	-1,357	-45.85%	2,960
Hamblen	7,093	69.23%	3,122	30.47%	30	0.29%	0	0.00%	3,971	38.76%	10,245
Hamilton	39,703	55.70%	30,482	42.77%	959	1.35%	133	0.19%	9,221	12.93%	71,277
Hancock	2,107	82.56%	438	17.16%	7	0.27%	0	0.00%	1,669	65.40%	2,552
Hardeman	1,601	44.42%	1,711	47.48%	288	7.99%	4	0.11%	-110	-3.06%	3,604
Hardin	3,323	65.18%	1,690	33.15%	73	1.43%	12	0.24%	1,633	32.03%	5,098
Hawkins	7,010	72.48%	2,586	26.74%	65	0.67%	11	0.11%	4,424	45.74%	9,672
Haywood	1,188	35.63%	1,867	56.00%	258	7.74%	21	0.63%	-679	-20.37%	3,334
Henderson	3,597	70.14%	1,490	29.06%	31	0.60%	10	0.20%	2,107	41.08%	5,128
Henry	3,033	36.93%	5,049	61.48%	131	1.60%	0	0.00%	-2,016	-24.55%	8,213
Hickman	1,224	33.20%	2,401	65.12%	38	1.03%	24	0.65%	-1,177	-31.92%	3,687
Houston	366	23.87%	1,150	75.02%	13	0.85%	4	0.26%	-784	-51.15%	1,533
Humphreys	1,126	29.90%	2,592	68.83%	27	0.72%	21	0.56%	-1,466	-38.93%	3,766
Jackson	1,049	39.80%	1,539	58.38%	10	0.38%	38	1.44%	-490	-18.58%	2,636
Jefferson	6,141	78.79%	1,620	20.79%	28	0.36%	5	0.06%	4,521	58.00%	7,794
Johnson	3,854	86.74%	571	12.85%	13	0.29%	5	0.11%	3,283	73.89%	4,443
Knox	50,811	61.00%	31,990	38.40%	413	0.50%	86	0.10%	18,821	22.60%	83,300
Lake	732	34.03%	1,346	62.58%	62	2.88%	11	0.51%	-614	-28.55%	2,151
Lauderdale	1,322	27.36%	3,462	71.65%	48	0.99%	0	0.00%	-2,140	-44.29%	4,832
Lawrence	5,709	53.66%	4,862	45.70%	47	0.44%	21	0.20%	847	7.96%	10,639
Lewis	580	25.09%	1,723	74.52%	4	0.17%	5	0.22%	-1,143	-49.43%	2,312
Lincoln	1,428	22.53%	4,862	76.71%	30	0.47%	18	0.28%	-3,434	-54.18%	6,338
Loudon	5,356	65.47%	2,722	33.27%	61	0.75%	42	0.51%	2,634	32.20%	8,181
Macon	2,829	74.80%	915	24.19%	38	1.00%	0	0.00%	1,914	50.61%	3,782
Madison	8,863	50.09%	8,083	45.68%	717	4.05%	30	0.17%	780	4.41%	17,693
Marion	2,657	45.30%	3,124	53.27%	76	1.30%	8	0.14%	-467	-7.97%	5,865
Marshall	1,717	31.87%	3,625	67.29%	38	0.71%	7	0.13%	-1,908	-35.42%	5,387
Maury	4,133	37.99%	6,615	60.81%	113	1.04%	18	0.17%	-2,482	-22.82%	10,879
McMinn	6,586	61.17%	4,111	38.18%	70	0.65%	0	0.00%	2,475	22.99%	10,767
McNairy	3,310	59.15%	2,173	38.83%	93	1.66%	20	0.36%	1,137	20.32%	5,596
Meigs	901	56.14%	691	43.05%	7	0.44%	6	0.37%	210	13.09%	1,605
Monroe	4,991	59.05%	3,375	39.93%	36	0.43%	50	0.59%	1,616	19.12%	8,452
Montgomery	2,550	24.83%	7,635	74.34%	61	0.59%	24	0.23%	-5,085	-49.51%	10,270
Moore	313	26.37%	863	72.70%	9	0.76%	2	0.17%	-550	-46.33%	1,187
Morgan	2,241	58.13%	1,576	40.88%	38	0.99%	0	0.00%	665	17.25%	3,855
Obion	3,800	46.36%	4,244	51.78%	122	1.49%	30	0.37%	-444	-5.42%	8,196
Overton	1,831	43.06%	2,389	56.19%	23	0.54%	9	0.21%	-558	-13.13%	4,252
Perry	645	37.13%	1,076	61.95%	8	0.46%	8	0.46%	-431	-24.82%	1,737
Pickett	1,154	67.05%	567	32.95%	0	0.00%	0	0.00%	587	34.10%	1,721
Polk	2,187	58.30%	1,532	40.84%	23	0.61%	9	0.24%	655	17.46%	3,751
Putnam	4,240	48.65%	4,443	50.98%	32	0.37%	0	0.00%	-203	-2.33%	8,715
Rhea	2,721	59.78%	1,761	38.69%	52	1.14%	18	0.40%	960	21.09%	4,552
Roane	6,540	56.25%	4,953	42.60%	108	0.93%	25	0.22%	1,587	13.65%	11,626
Robertson	1,776	30.15%	4,053	68.80%	46	0.78%	16	0.27%	-2,277	-38.65%	5,891
Rutherford	4,526	40.95%	6,410	58.00%	91	0.82%	25	0.23%	-1,884	-17.05%	11,052
Scott	3,301	74.84%	1,098	24.89%	3	0.07%	9	0.20%	2,203	49.95%	4,411
Sequatchie	703	42.48%	930	56.19%	18	1.09%	4	0.24%	-227	-13.71%	1,655
Sevier	7,818	85.05%	1,341	14.59%	27	0.29%	6	0.07%	6,477	70.46%	9,192
Shelby	87,191	49.37%	86,270	48.85%	2,956	1.67%	190	0.11%	921	0.52%	176,607
Smith	1,601	39.43%	2,411	59.38%	36	0.89%	12	0.30%	-810	-19.95%	4,060
Stewart	539	22.59%	1,810	75.86%	31	1.30%	6	0.25%	-1,271	-53.27%	2,386
Sullivan	22,354	59.46%	14,731	39.18%	139	0.37%	374	0.99%	7,623	20.28%	37,598
Sumner	3,491	34.02%	6,687	65.17%	58	0.57%	25	0.24%	-3,196	-31.15%	10,261
Tipton	1,829	30.91%	3,853	65.12%	211	3.57%	24	0.41%	-2,024	-34.21%	5,917
Trousdale	308	22.71%	1,036	76.40%	9	0.66%	3	0.22%	-728	-53.69%	1,356
Unicoi	4,004	75.04%	1,322	24.78%	7	0.13%	3	0.06%	2,682	50.26%	5,336
Union	2,082	75.63%	652	23.68%	11	0.40%	8	0.29%	1,430	51.95%	2,753
Van Buren	401	40.30%	577	57.99%	7	0.70%	10	1.01%	-176	-17.69%	995
Warren	2,682	45.92%	3,119	53.40%	32	0.55%	8	0.14%	-437	-7.48%	5,841
Washington	14,851	69.93%	6,283	29.59%	63	0.30%	39	0.18%	8,568	40.34%	21,236
Wayne	2,912	75.21%	931	24.04%	17	0.44%	12	0.31%	1,981	51.17%	3,872
Weakley	3,543	43.69%	4,488	55.35%	78	0.96%	0	0.00%	-945	-11.66%	8,109
White	1,725	43.15%	2,207	55.20%	35	0.88%	31	0.78%	-482	-12.05%	3,998
Williamson	2,699	37.34%	4,471	61.86%	49	0.68%	9	0.12%	-1,772	-24.52%	7,228
Wilson	3,383	40.77%	4,857	58.54%	49	0.59%	8	0.10%	-1,474	-17.77%	8,297
Totals	556,577	52.92%	481,453	45.77%	11,304	1.07%	2,458	0.23%	75,124	7.15%	1,051,792

==== Counties that flipped from Democratic to Republican ====
- Chester
- Clay
- Crockett
- Decatur
- Dyer
- Madison

==== Counties that flipped from Republican to Democratic ====
- Marion

Counties that flipped from States' Rights to Republican

- Fayette

== Analysis ==
Tennessee was, despite unclear predictions before the election, comfortably won by Nixon and United States Ambassador to the United Nations Henry Cabot Lodge Jr., with 52.92 percent of the popular vote. Kennedy and running mate Texas Senator Lyndon B. Johnson won 45.77 percent of the popular vote.

Nixon was the first losing Republican to win Tennessee and the only one until John McCain in 2008. Kennedy was the first Democrat to win without the state since 1852. Nixon's win was due to general gains due to the strong anti-Catholicism of this “Bible Belt” state. Unlike Herbert Hoover’s 1928 victory against previous Catholic nominee Al Smith, Nixon also made strong gains amongst white voters of the Black Belt who had deserted the Democrats since Harry S. Truman’s first civil rights proclamations. Tennessee was one of six states that swung towards Republicans compared to 1956, alongside Alabama, Georgia, Mississippi, Oklahoma, and South Carolina.
