= Mountain Bogs National Wildlife Refuge =

National Wildlife Refuge in North Carolina, United States

- IUCN category IV (habitat/species management area)
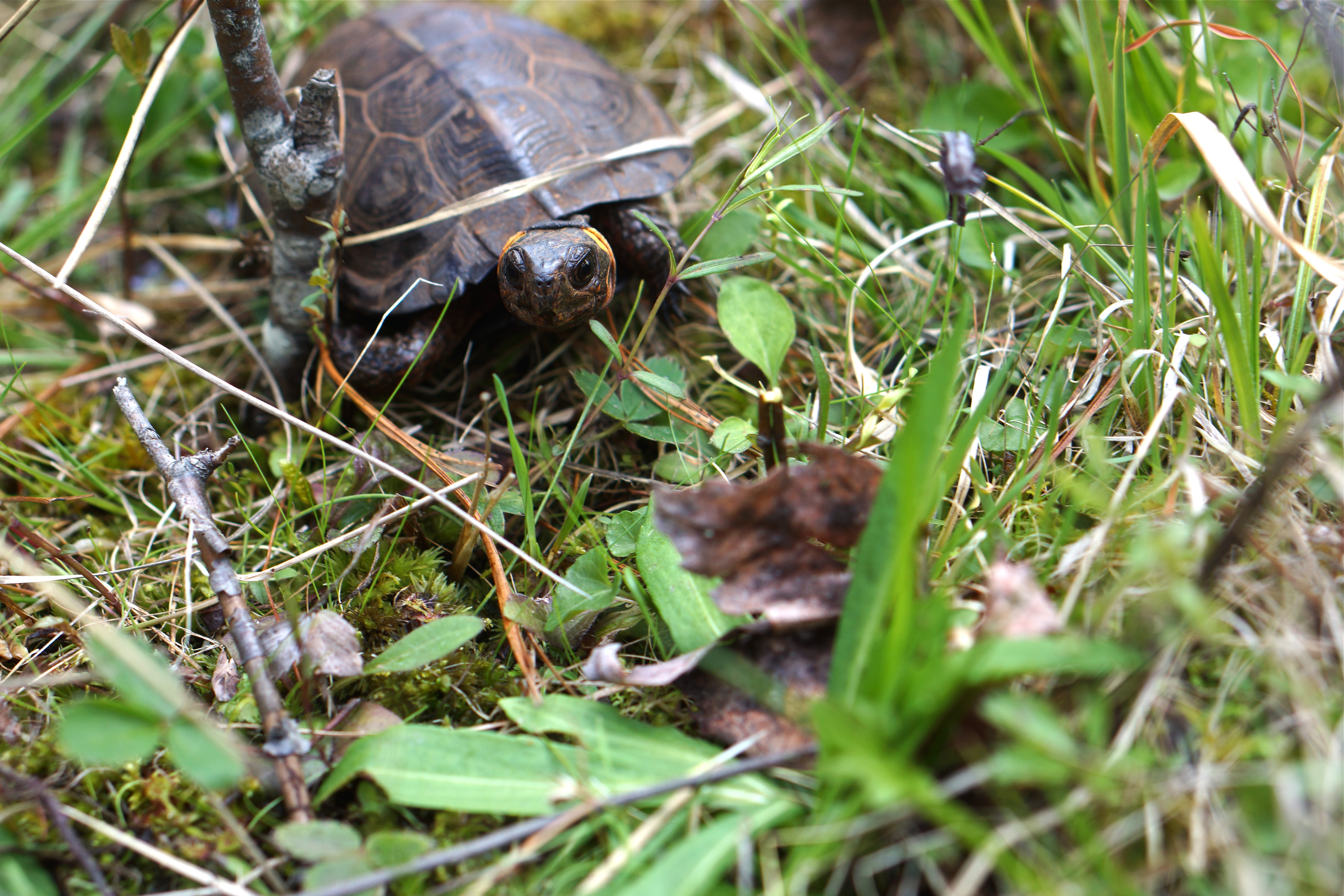
- Bog turtle crawling through the grass

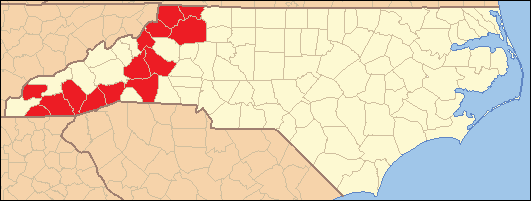
- North Carolina counties within the Mountain Bogs National Wildlife Refuge
- Location: Western North Carolina and Eastern Tennessee, United States
- Nearest city: Asheville, North Carolina
- Coordinates: 35°36′29″N 82°34′08″W
- Area: ~7,000 acres (28 km^{2})
- Established: 2015
- Governing body: U.S. Fish and Wildlife Service
- Website: Mountain Bogs National Wildlife Refuge

The Mountain Bogs National Wildlife Refuge is a federally protected wildlife refuge located within multiple western North Carolina counties, United States. The refuge has a total area of over 7,000 acres (28 km^{2}) consisting of fee title and conservation easements on privately owned property. In order to respect the wishes of the landowner, and protect sensitive habitat, the refuge is currently not open to the public.

The refuge was established in 2015 to conserve Southern Appalachian Bogs in North Carolina and Tennessee, and the U.S. Fish and Wildlife Service plans to add more sites to the refuge, by working with willing landowners. As of March 2025, portions of 14 North Carolina counties and two Tennessee counties are within the Mountain Bogs National Wildlife Refuge.

The reserve protects habitat for multiple threatened and endangered species, migratory birds, and important game species.

Mountain Bogs NWF is managed by the Piedmont National Wildlife Refuge.

== Counties ==
=== North Carolina ===
- Alleghany County
- Ashe County
- Avery County
- Burke County
- Clay County
- Graham County
- Henderson County
- Jackson County
- Macon County
- McDowell County
- Rutherford County
- Transylvania County
- Watauga County
- Wilkes County

=== Tennessee ===
- Carter County
- Johnson County

== See also ==
List of largest National Wildlife Refuges
