= List of United States Supreme Court cases, volume 148 =

Supreme Court of the United States
- Interactive map of Supreme Court of the United States
- 38°53′26″N 77°00′16″W
- Established: March 4, 1789; 236 years ago
- Location: Washington, D.C.
- Coordinates: 38°53′26″N 77°00′16″W
- Composition method: Presidential nomination with Senate confirmation
- Authorised by: Constitution of the United States, Art. III, § 1
- Judge term length: life tenure, subject to impeachment and removal
- Number of positions: 9 (by statute)
- Website: supremecourt.gov

This is a list of cases reported in volume 148 of United States Reports, decided by the Supreme Court of the United States in 1893.

== Justices of the Supreme Court at the time of volume 148 U.S. ==
The Supreme Court is established by Article III, Section 1 of the Constitution of the United States, which says: "The judicial Power of the United States, shall be vested in one supreme Court . . .". The size of the Court is not specified; the Constitution leaves it to Congress to set the number of justices. Under the Judiciary Act of 1789 Congress originally fixed the number of justices at six (one chief justice and five associate justices). Since 1789 Congress has varied the size of the Court from six to seven, nine, ten, and back to nine justices (always including one chief justice).

When the cases in volume 148 U.S. were decided the Court comprised the following nine members:

Portrait	Justice	Office	Home State	Succeeded	Date confirmed by the Senate (Vote)	Tenure on Supreme Court
	Melville Fuller	Chief Justice	Illinois	Morrison Waite	July 20, 1888 (41–20)	October 8, 1888 – July 4, 1910 (Died)
	Stephen Johnson Field	Associate Justice	California	newly created seat	March 10, 1863 (Acclamation)	May 10, 1863 – December 1, 1897 (Retired)
	John Marshall Harlan	Associate Justice	Kentucky	David Davis	November 29, 1877 (Acclamation)	December 10, 1877 – October 14, 1911 (Died)
	Horace Gray	Associate Justice	Massachusetts	Nathan Clifford	December 20, 1881 (51–5)	January 9, 1882 – September 15, 1902 (Died)
	Samuel Blatchford	Associate Justice	New York	Ward Hunt	March 22, 1882 (Acclamation)	April 3, 1882 – July 7, 1893 (Died)
	David Josiah Brewer	Associate Justice	Kansas	Stanley Matthews	December 18, 1889 (53–11)	January 6, 1890 – March 28, 1910 (Died)
	Henry Billings Brown	Associate Justice	Michigan	Samuel Freeman Miller	December 29, 1890 (Acclamation)	January 5, 1891 – May 28, 1906 (Retired)
	George Shiras Jr.	Associate Justice	Pennsylvania	Joseph P. Bradley	July 26, 1892 (Acclamation)	October 10, 1892 – February 23, 1903 (Retired)
	Howell Edmunds Jackson	Associate Justice	Tennessee	Lucius Quintus Cincinnatus Lamar	February 18, 1893 (Acclamation)	March 4, 1893 – August 8, 1895 (Died)

== Notable Cases in 148 U.S. ==
=== Pettibone v. United States ===
In Pettibone v. United States, 148 U.S. 197 (1893), the Supreme Court considered a criminal case involving the knowledge requirement in an obstruction of justice charge. It was the first Supreme Court case involving interpretation of obstruction of federal justice statutes. In the Court's opinion, Chief Justice Fuller wrote, "a person is not sufficiently charged with obstructing or impeding the due administration of justice in a court unless it appears that he knew of had notice that justice was being administered in such court".

=== Virginia v. Tennessee ===
Virginia v. Tennessee, 148 U.S. 503 (1893), is a case under the Supreme Court's original jurisdiction. The Court decided that if an agreement between two states sets the boundary between them, both states ratify that agreement, and one state later discovers that the boundary was wrong (such as the other state received a larger share of territory than originally planned), unless the other state agrees to change it, the original agreement nevertheless stands. In this particular instance, the Supreme Court rejected Virginia's contention that the intent of the original "charters of the English sovereigns" should take precedent over a 1803 compromise, which sought to address the situation initially and was agreed upon by both states. The Court also decided that because the states informed Congress of the original survey that both states hired people to establish carefully and then enacted as legislation by the two states, the agreement was implicitly approved by Congress, and the border between the two states had been set forth in the survey.

== Citation style ==
Under the Judiciary Act of 1789 the federal court structure at the time comprised District Courts, which had general trial jurisdiction; Circuit Courts, which had mixed trial and appellate (from the US District Courts) jurisdiction; and the United States Supreme Court, which had appellate jurisdiction over the federal District and Circuit courts—and for certain issues over state courts. The Supreme Court also had limited original jurisdiction (i.e., in which cases could be filed directly with the Supreme Court without first having been heard by a lower federal or state court). There were one or more federal District Courts and/or Circuit Courts in each state, territory, or other geographical region.

The Judiciary Act of 1891 created the United States Courts of Appeals and reassigned the jurisdiction of most routine appeals from the district and circuit courts to these appellate courts. The Act created nine new courts that were originally known as the "United States Circuit Courts of Appeals." The new courts had jurisdiction over most appeals of lower court decisions. The Supreme Court could review either legal issues that a court of appeals certified or decisions of court of appeals by writ of certiorari.

Bluebook citation style is used for case names, citations, and jurisdictions.

- "# Cir." = United States Court of Appeals
  - e.g., "3d Cir." = United States Court of Appeals for the Third Circuit
- "C.C.D." = United States Circuit Court for the District of . . .
  - e.g.,"C.C.D.N.J." = United States Circuit Court for the District of New Jersey
- "D." = United States District Court for the District of . . .
  - e.g.,"D. Mass." = United States District Court for the District of Massachusetts
- "E." = Eastern; "M." = Middle; "N." = Northern; "S." = Southern; "W." = Western
  - e.g.,"C.C.S.D.N.Y." = United States Circuit Court for the Southern District of New York
  - e.g.,"M.D. Ala." = United States District Court for the Middle District of Alabama
- "Ct. Cl." = United States Court of Claims
- The abbreviation of a state's name alone indicates the highest appellate court in that state's judiciary at the time.
  - e.g.,"Pa." = Supreme Court of Pennsylvania
  - e.g.,"Me." = Supreme Judicial Court of Maine

== List of cases in volume 148 U.S. ==
Case Name	Page and year	Opinion of the Court	Concurring opinion(s)	Dissenting opinion(s)	Lower Court	Disposition
The J.E. Rumbell	1 (1893)	Gray	none	none	7th Cir.	certification
Moelle v. Sherwood	21 (1893)	Field	none	none	C.C.D. Neb.	affirmed
United States v. California and Oregon Land Company	31 (1893)	Brewer	none	none	9th Cir.	affirmed
United States v. Dalles Military Road Company	49 (1893)	Brewer	none	none	9th Cir.	affirmed
Commercial National Bank v. Armstrong	50 (1893)	Brewer	none	none	C.C.S.D. Ohio	affirmed
May v. Tenney	60 (1893)	Brewer	none	none	C.C.D. Colo.	reversed
Lehnen v. Dickson	71 (1893)	Brewer	none	none	C.C.E.D. Mo.	affirmed
Astiazaran v. Santa Rita Land and Mining Company	80 (1893)	Gray	none	none	Sup. Ct. Terr. Ariz.	affirmed
United States v. Fletcher	84 (1893)	Fuller	none	none	Ct. Cl.	reversed
City of St. Louis v. Western Union Telegraph Company	92 (1893)	Brewer	none	Brown	C.C.E.D. Mo.	reversed
Virginia v. Paul	107 (1893)	Gray	none	none	C.C.W.D. Va.	mandamus granted
United States v. Post	124 (1893)	Blatchford	none	none	Ct. Cl.	affirmed
United States v. Gates	134 (1893)	Blatchford	none	none	Ct. Cl.	affirmed
Bier v. McGehee	137 (1893)	Brown	none	none	La. Ct. App.	dismissed
Rosenthal v. Coates	142 (1893)	Brewer	none	none	C.C.W.D. Mo.	affirmed
Indiana v. United States	148 (1893)	Gray	none	none	Ct. Cl.	affirmed
In Re Schneider I	157 (1893)	Fuller	none	none	Sup. Ct. D.C.	dismissed
In Re Schneider II	162 (1893)	Fuller	none	none	Sup. Ct. D.C.	dismissed
Roget v. United States	167 (1893)	Shiras	none	none	Ct. Cl.	affirmed
Marx v. Hanthorn	172 (1893)	Shiras	none	none	C.C.D. Or.	affirmed
United States v. Alexander	186 (1893)	Shiras	none	none	Ct. Cl.	affirmed
United States v. Truesdell	196 (1893)	Shiras	none	none	Ct. Cl.	affirmed
Pettibone v. United States	197 (1893)	Fuller	none	Brewer	D. Idaho	reversed
Passavant v. United States	214 (1893)	Blatchford	none	none	C.C.S.D.N.Y.	affirmed
In re Sanborn	222 (1893)	Shiras	none	none	Ct. Cl.	mandamus denied
Gaines v. Rugg	228 (1893)	Blatchford	none	none	C.C.E.D. Ark.	mandamus granted
Hume v. Bowie	245 (1893)	Fuller	none	none	Sup. Ct. D.C.	dismissed
Pennsylvania Company v. Bender	255 (1893)	Brewer	none	none	Ohio	dismissed
Hohorst v. Hamburg American Packet Company	262 (1893)	Fuller	none	none	C.C.S.D.N.Y.	dismissed
Columbus Watch Company v. Robbins	266 (1893)	Fuller	none	none	6th Cir.	dismissed
Huber v. Nelson Manufacturing Company	270 (1893)	Blatchford	none	none	C.C.E.D. Mo.	affirmed
Wasatch Mining Company v. Crescent Mining Company	293 (1893)	Shiras	none	none	Sup. Ct. Terr. Utah	affirmed
Cameron v. United States	301 (1893)	Brown	none	none	Sup. Ct. Terr. Ariz.	reversed
Monongahela Navigation Company v. United States	312 (1893)	Brewer	none	none	C.C.W.D. Pa.	reversed
Ankeny v. Clark	345 (1893)	Shiras	none	none	Sup. Ct. Terr. Wash.	affirmed
Johnston v. Standard Mining Company	360 (1893)	Brown	none	none	C.C.D. Colo.	affirmed
American Construction Company v. Jacksonville, Tampa and Key West Railway Company	372 (1893)	Gray	none	none	5th Cir.	mandamus denied
Wolfe v. Hartford Life Annuity Insurance Company	389 (1893)	Fuller	none	none	C.C.S.D.N.Y.	reversed
Ogden v. United States	390 (1893)	Fuller	none	none	C.C.E.D. La.	dismissed
Northern Pacific Railroad Company v. Walker	391 (1893)	Fuller	none	none	8th Cir.	reversed
Barnum v. Town of Okolona	393 (1893)	Shiras	none	none	N.D. Miss.	affirmed
People ex rel. Schurz v. Cook	397 (1893)	Jackson	none	none	N.Y. Sup. Ct.	affirmed
Manhattan Company v. Blake	412 (1893)	Blatchford	none	none	C.C.S.D.N.Y.	affirmed
United States v. Old Settlers	427 (1893)	Fuller	none	none	Ct. Cl.	affirmed
National Hat Pouncing Machine Company v. Hedden	482 (1893)	Brown	none	none	C.C.D.N.J.	affirmed
Smith v. Townsend	490 (1893)	Brewer	none	none	Sup. Ct. Terr. Okla.	affirmed
Bender v. Pennsylvania Company	502 (1893)	Fuller	none	none	C.C.N.D. Ohio	dismissed
Virginia v. Tennessee	503 (1893)	Field	none	none	original	boundary set
Chicot County v. Sherwood	529 (1893)	Jackson	none	none	C.C.E.D. Ark.	affirmed
Lascelles v. Georgia	537 (1893)	Jackson	none	none	Ga.	affirmed
Grant v. Walter	547 (1893)	Jackson	none	none	C.C.S.D.N.Y.	affirmed
Krementz v. S. Cottle Company	556 (1893)	Shiras	none	none	C.C.S.D.N.Y.	reversed
United States v. Union Pacific Railway Company	562 (1893)	Brown	none	none	C.C.D. Colo.	affirmed
German Bank of Memphis v. United States	573 (1893)	Brown	none	none	Ct. Cl.	affirmed
Lonergan v. Buford	581 (1893)	Brewer	none	none	Sup. Ct. Terr. Utah	affirmed
Atchison Board of Education v. De Kay	591 (1893)	Brewer	none	none	C.C.D. Kan.	affirmed
Swan Land and Cattle Company v. Frank	603 (1893)	Jackson	none	Brown	C.C.N.D. Ill.	decree modified
Casement v. Brown	615 (1893)	Brewer	none	none	C.C.S.D. Ohio	affirmed
Humphreys v. Perry	627 (1893)	Blatchford	none	none	C.C.N.D. Ill.	reversed
Isaacs v. Jonas	648 (1893)	Gray	none	none	C.C.E.D. La.	affirmed
United States v. Isaacs	654 (1893)	Gray	none	none	C.C.E.D. La.	reversed
Giozza v. Tiernan	657 (1893)	Fuller	none	none	C.C.E.D. Tex.	affirmed
Martin v. Snyder	663 (1893)	Fuller	none	none	C.C.N.D. Ill.	reversed
Mexia v. Oliver	664 (1893)	Blatchford	none	none	C.C.N.D. Tex.	reversed
Smith v. Whitman Saddle Company	674 (1893)	Fuller	none	none	C.C.D. Conn.	reversed
Bushnell v. Crooke Mining and Smelting Company	682 (1893)	Jackson	none	none	C.C.D. Colo.	dismissed
Pam-to-Pee v. United States	691 (1893)	Shiras	none	none	Ct. Cl.	affirmed
