= 1852 United States presidential election in Massachusetts =

- November 2, 1852
- Turnout: 57.8% ▼6.8 pp
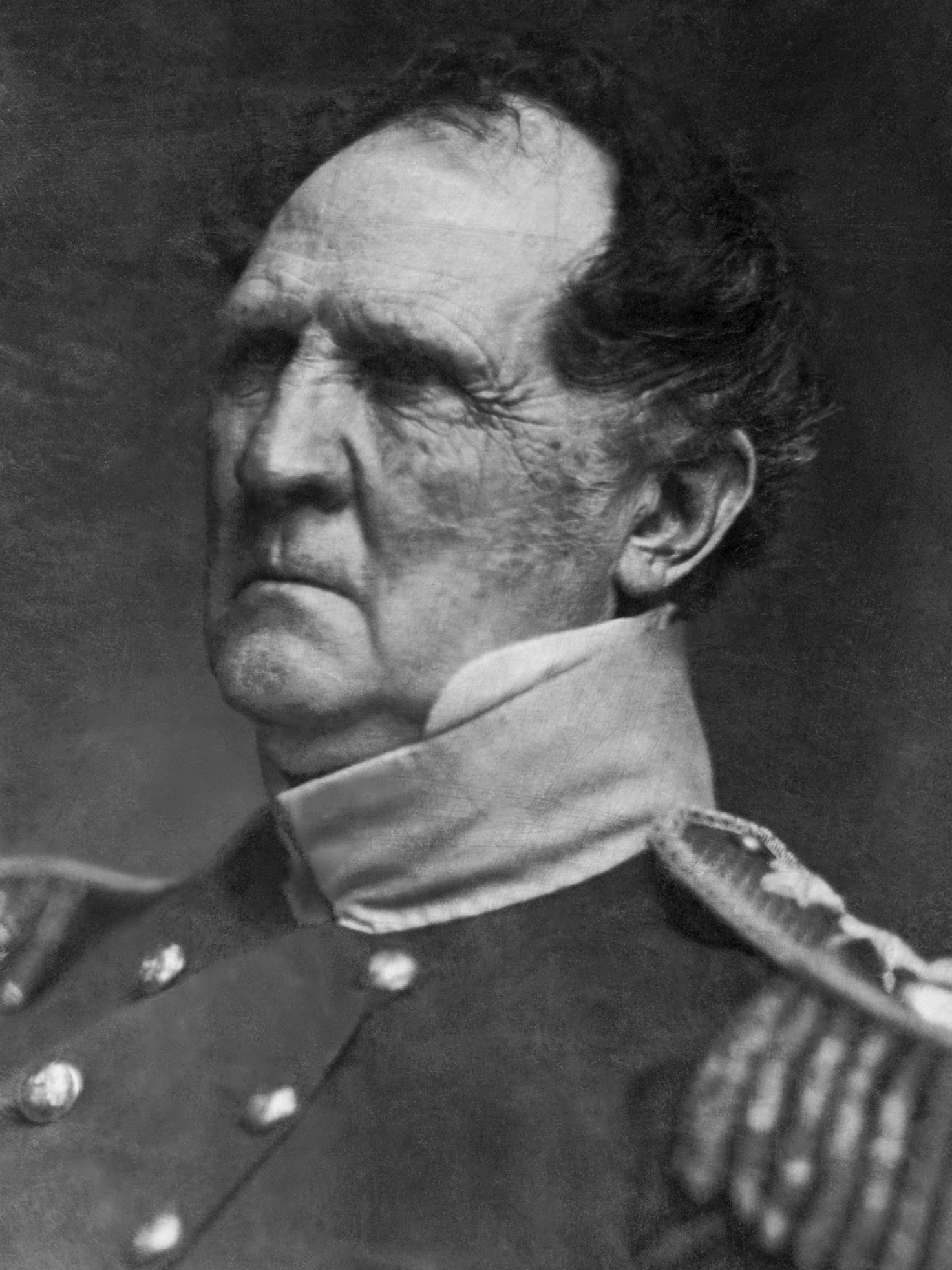

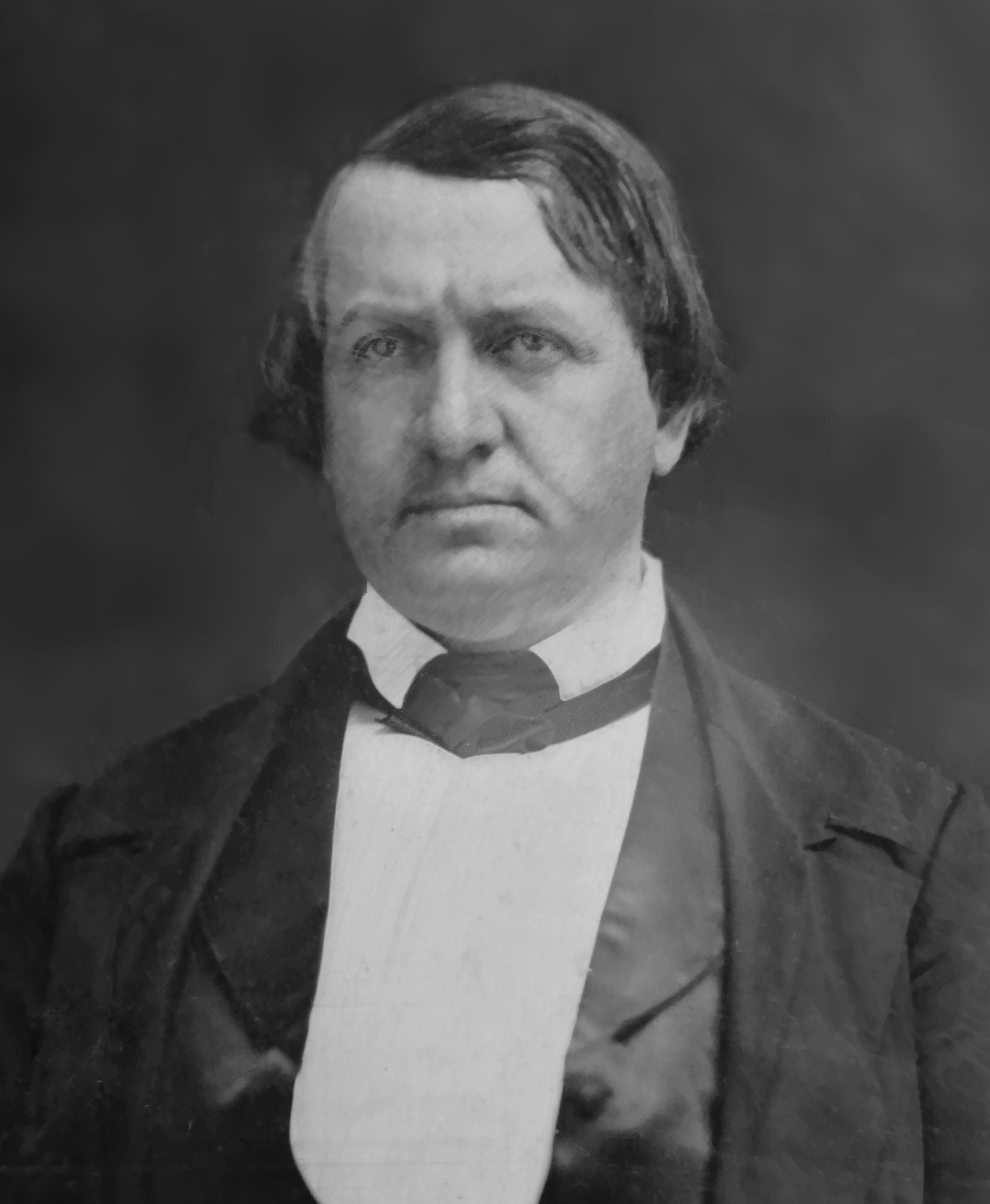
Nominee	Winfield Scott	Franklin Pierce	John P. Hale
Party	Whig	Democratic	Free Soil
Home state	New Jersey	New Hampshire	New Hampshire
Running mate	William Alexander Graham	William R. King	George W. Julian
Electoral vote	13	0	0
Popular vote	52,683	44,569	28,023
Percentage	41.45%	35.07%	22.05%
County results
Scott
40–50%
50–60%
60–70%
Pierce
50–60%
President before election
Millard Fillmore
Whig
Elected President
Franklin Pierce
Democratic

The 1852 United States presidential election in Massachusetts took place on November 2, 1852, as part of the 1852 United States presidential election. Voters chose 13 representatives, or electors to the Electoral College, who voted for President and Vice President.

Massachusetts voted for the Whig Party candidate, Winfield Scott, over the Democratic candidate, Franklin Pierce. Scott won the state by a narrow margin of 6.38%.

Massachusetts was one of the four states to vote for Scott. The other three were Kentucky, Tennessee and Vermont. Free Soil Party candidate John P. Hale won 22.05% of the vote in the state, making Massachusetts his strongest state.

Daniel Webster died 9 days before the election of a cerebral hemorrhage on October 24, 1852. This caused many Union and Native American state parties to remove him and his running mate Charles Jones Jenkins from their slates of electors and was replaced by Jacob Broom and Reynell Coates. The Webster-Jenkins Union ticket, however, remained on the ballot in both Massachusetts and Georgia. As of 2020, this election marks only the first of three times (after 1972 and 1980) that Massachusetts has not voted for the same candidate as neighboring Rhode Island.

== Results ==
1852 United States presidential election in Massachusetts
Party	Candidate	Votes	Percentage	Electoral votes
Whig	Winfield Scott	52,683	41.45%	13
Democratic	Franklin Pierce	44,569	35.07%	0
Free Soil	John P. Hale	28,023	22.05%	0
Independent Whig	Daniel Webster†	1,670	1.31%	0
Know Nothing	Jacob Broom	158	0.12%	0
Totals		127,103	100.00%	13

== See also ==
- United States presidential elections in Massachusetts
