= Virginia v. Tennessee =

- Supreme Court of the United States

Original jurisdiction Argued March 8–9, 1893 Decided April 3, 1893
- Full case name: Commonwealth of Virginia v. State of Tennessee
- Citations: 148 U.S. 503 (more) 13 S. Ct. 728; 37 L. Ed. 537; 1893 U.S. LEXIS 2248

Outcome
- The border as set forth in the survey of 1803 is the border between the two states.

Court membership
- Chief Justice Melville Fuller Associate Justices Stephen J. Field · John M. Harlan; Horace Gray · Samuel Blatchford; David J. Brewer · Henry B. Brown; George Shiras Jr. · Howell E. Jackson

Case opinion
- Majority: Field, joined by unanimous

Laws applied
- U.S. Const. Art. I, § 10, cl. 3

Virginia v. Tennessee, 148 U.S. 503 (1893), was a suit brought before the Supreme Court of the United States that sought to settle two questions:

- What is the correct boundary between the two states and, if the boundary was inaccurately set, can the state ask the court to change it?
- Does an agreement setting the boundary between two states require approval of Congress under the Compact Clause of the United States Constitution?

When two states have a controversy between each other, the case is filed for original jurisdiction of the Supreme Court of the United States. That is one of the very limited circumstances in which the court acts as original jurisdiction (a trial court) although, as the suit was at equity rather than law, no jury was impaneled if either side had even wanted one in the first place. In all other cases, the court acts as the highest appellate court in the United States.

The court decided that if a prior agreement between the two states sets the boundary, both states ratify that agreement, and one state later discovers that the boundary was wrong (such as the other state received a larger share of territory than originally planned), unless the other state agrees to change it, the original agreement stands.

In this particular instance, the Supreme Court rejected Virginia's contention that the intent of the original "charters of the English sovereigns" should take precedent over the 1803 compromise, which sought to address the situation initially and was agreed upon by both states.

As to what represents an interstate compact requiring approval from Congress, the court said it is agreements that would in some fashion increase the power of a state. If a state, for example, wanted to send an exhibit to a World's Fair in another state, it would not need approval by Congress to contract to use a canal owned by another state for its exhibit or its people to pass through along the way.

If a compact or agreement between two states requires congressional approval, the approval may be implied, such as if a state sends information to Congress about an agreement, and Congress accepts and records the details. Approval may be requested in advance, or, for a type of compact in which the details could not be known before the compact was ratified, after the compact is created.

The court decided that because the states informed Congress of the original survey that both states hired people to establish carefully and then enacted as legislation by the two states, the agreement was implicitly approved by Congress, and the border between the two states had been set forth in the survey.

== See also ==
- List of United States Supreme Court cases, volume 148
- North Carolina–Tennessee–Virginia Corners
