= 1852 United States presidential election in Kentucky =

- November 2, 1852
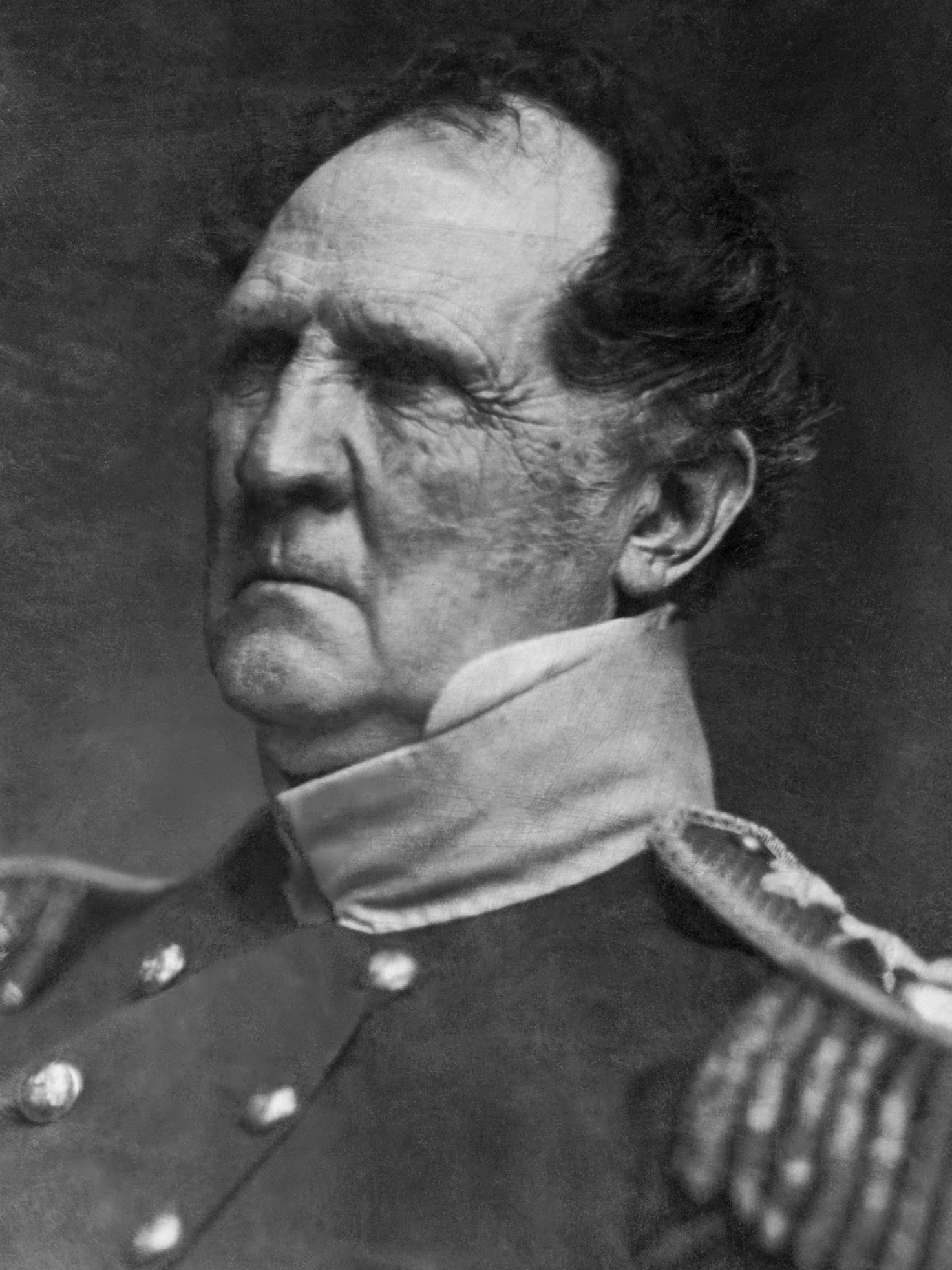

| Nominee | Winfield Scott | Franklin Pierce |
| Party | Whig | Democratic |
| Home state | New Jersey | New Hampshire |
| Running mate | William Alexander Graham | William R. King |
| Electoral vote | 12 | 0 |
| Popular vote | 57,428 | 53,949 |
| Percentage | 51.44% | 48.32% |
County results
Scott
50–60%
60–70%
70–80%
80–90%
Pierce
50–60%
60–70%
70–80%
80–90%
President before election
Millard Fillmore
Whig
Elected President
Franklin Pierce
Democratic

The 1852 United States presidential election in Kentucky took place on November 2, 1852, as part of the 1852 United States presidential election. Voters chose 12 representatives, or electors to the Electoral College, who voted for President and Vice President.

Kentucky voted for the Whig candidate, Winfield Scott, over Democratic candidate Franklin Pierce. Scott won Kentucky by a margin of 3.12%.

Kentucky was one of the four states to vote for Scott in the 1852 election with the other three being Massachusetts, Tennessee and Vermont.

With 51.44% of the popular vote, Kentucky would prove to be Scott's strongest victory in the nation.

== Results ==
1852 United States presidential election in Kentucky
| Party | Candidate | Running mate | Popular vote | | Electoral vote | |
| Party | Candidate | Running mate | Count | % | Count | % |
|---|---|---|---|---|---|---|
| Whig | Winfield Scott of New Jersey | William Alexander Graham of North Carolina | 57,428 | 51.44% | 12 | 100.00% |
| Democratic | Franklin Pierce of New Hampshire | William R. King of Alabama | 53,949 | 48.32% | 0 | 0.00% |
| Free Soil | John P. Hale of New Hampshire | George W. Julian of Indiana | 266 | 0.24% | 0 | 0.00% |
| Total | | | 111,643 | 100.00% | 12 | 100.00% |
