= North Carolina–Tennessee–Virginia Corners =

Geographical point at which US states meet

Coordinates: 36°35′17.3076″N 81°40′38.6718″W

The North Carolina–Tennessee–Virginia Corners is a tripoint at which North Carolina, Tennessee and Virginia meet. The landmark is located in the Iron Mountains, and is roughly 16 miles (26 km) north of Snake Mountain, and 8 miles (13 km) southwest of Mount Rogers (the highest mountain in Virginia).

The nearest town is Whitetop, Virginia, which is about 4 miles (6.4 km) northeast of the corner. The marker can be accessed by a hiking trail.

== History ==
The location of the tripoint is the result of inadequate survey equipment used during the 18th century. The debates over the location of the tripoint and the boundaries between Virginia and Tennessee drew tension and led to the US Supreme Court decision Virginia v. Tennessee, which led to the modern borders and established the 1802 tripoint in 1893.

The first attempt at establishing a tripoint began in 1665, when the borders of the Colony of Virginia and the Province of Carolina were defined. That year, Charles II of England modified the charter of Carolina to grant the colony control over the entire Albemarle Sound, which caused the boundary to follow the 36th parallel north, 34 miles (55 km) north of the original boundary. In practice, the idea was that the boundary would follow through when the state of Tennessee was established. It was only in 1710 when surveyors began defining the boundary so that land could be purchased and sold for tax revenues. The attempted survey ended with a land dispute since Edward Moseley of Carolina accused the Virginian surveyors of using inaccurate surveying equipment, and the surveyors believed that Mosely had a conflict of interest in lands speculated along the border.

A second attempt to survey the land came in 1728, which was jointly surveyed by both Virginia and North Carolina. The new line, documented by William Byrd II, showed the line starting at the Atlantic Ocean and traversing inland to the Dan River (known as the Fitzwilliam River in the Province of North Carolina). The 1728 line terminated its surveying line near what is now Danville, Virginia.

The surveying team from Virginia believed that colonial settlement would continue to expand westward, the William Byrd II team surveyed the line all the way to Peters Creek, Virginia, about 40 miles (64 km) west. The North Carolinian team terminated its survey sooner since it believed that additional surveying would cause a rush for westward expansion.

In 1749, a Virginian team, consisting of Peter Jefferson and Joshua Fry, surveyed an additional 90 miles (140 km) west of the Peters Creek point. The survey was claimed to be vastly inaccurate, a claim later proven to be true, since Jefferson and Fry drifted nearly five miles north of the parallel by failing to account for variation in magnetic north. The survey was then known as the Fry-Jefferson line of 1751. Jefferson was later remembered for surveying the Great Wagon Road, which became a precedent for travel in the Shenandoah Valley from Pennsylvania to Virginia.

The revised ending point of the Fry-Jefferson Line became the site of Steep Rock Creek now Beaverdam Creek near where the modern tripoint of the three states is located. Steep Rock is often mistaken for modern Laurel Creek rather than Beaverdam Creek. Mitchell's map of 1771 and the Fry-Jefferson map clearly show present Laurel Creek as Tooley's River. The Fry- Jefferson survey line crossed the location of State Line Cemetery 1820, Fodderstack Mountain and then Iron Mountain to terminate just south of Backbone Rock on a small island, surely Backbone Rock is the "steep" rock. Backbone Rock now lies in the VA-TN state line offset. Also, Laurel Creek had been named by the time Daniel Smith arrived in 1779. Smith's journal states on 8\18\1779 "Went to John Keys on the Laurel Fork the nearest house to our place of the beginning". The line differs from the modern Tennessee–Virginia line due to the compromise of Virginia v. Tennessee 1893, as different state-sponsored surveyors used different equipment to stake land claims for their states.

== See also ==
- Virginia v. Tennessee
- Virginia Creeper Trail, a multi-purpose National Recreation Trail of historical relevance, which passes within two miles to the northeast
- Appalachian Trail, which passes within three miles to the northwest
- Tri-State Peak, the tripoint of Kentucky, Tennessee, and Virginia, located within Cumberland Gap National Historical Park
