= Midway, Johnson County, Tennessee =

Midway
- Unincorporated community
- Location within Tennessee Location within the United States
- Coordinates: 36°24′49″N 81°46′04″W
- Country: United States
- State: Tennessee
- County: Johnson
- Elevation: 2,461 ft (750 m)
- Time zone: UTC-5 (Eastern (EST))
  - Summer (DST): UTC-4 (EDT)
- Area code: 423
- GNIS feature ID: 1328900

Midway is an unincorporated community in Johnson County, Tennessee. Midway is located on U.S. Route 421 and Tennessee State Route 34 4.7 miles (7.6 km) south-southeast of Mountain City.
