= Crandull, Tennessee =

Crandull
- Unincorporated community
- Location within Tennessee Location within the United States
- Coordinates: 36°32′49″N 81°53′45″W
- Country: United States
- State: Tennessee
- County: Johnson
- Elevation: 2,631 ft (802 m)
- Time zone: UTC-5 (Eastern (EST))
  - Summer (DST): UTC-4 (EDT)
- Area code: 423
- GNIS feature ID: 1314905

Crandull is an unincorporated community in Johnson County, Tennessee. Crandull is located on Tennessee State Route 133 7.1 miles (11.4 km) northwest of Mountain City.

Crandall was the terminus of the Beaver Dam Railroad, which was built from Damascus, Virginia to the Empire Lumber and Mining Company's mill at Crandall.
