= Pettibone v. United States =

- Supreme Court of the United States

Argued February 1–2, 1893 Decided March 6, 1893
- Full case name: Pettibone v. United States
- Citations: 148 U.S. 197 (more) 13 S. Ct. 542; 37 L. Ed. 419; 1893 U.S. LEXIS 2223

Court membership
- Chief Justice Melville Fuller Associate Justices Stephen J. Field · John M. Harlan; Horace Gray · Samuel Blatchford; David J. Brewer · Henry B. Brown; George Shiras Jr. · Howell E. Jackson

Case opinions
- Majority: Fuller, joined by Field, Harlan, Gray, Blatchford, Shiras, Jackson
- Dissent: Brewer, joined by Brown

Pettibone v. United States, 148 U.S. 197 (1893), is a United States Supreme Court criminal case involving the knowledge requirement in an obstruction of justice case. It was the first Supreme Court case involving interpretation of obstruction of justice statutes (currently United States Code Section 1503). Chief Justice Fuller wrote, "a person is not sufficiently charged with obstructing or impeding the due administration of justice in a court unless it appears that he knew of or had notice that justice was being administered in such court".
