= 1852 United States presidential election in Vermont =

- November 2, 1852
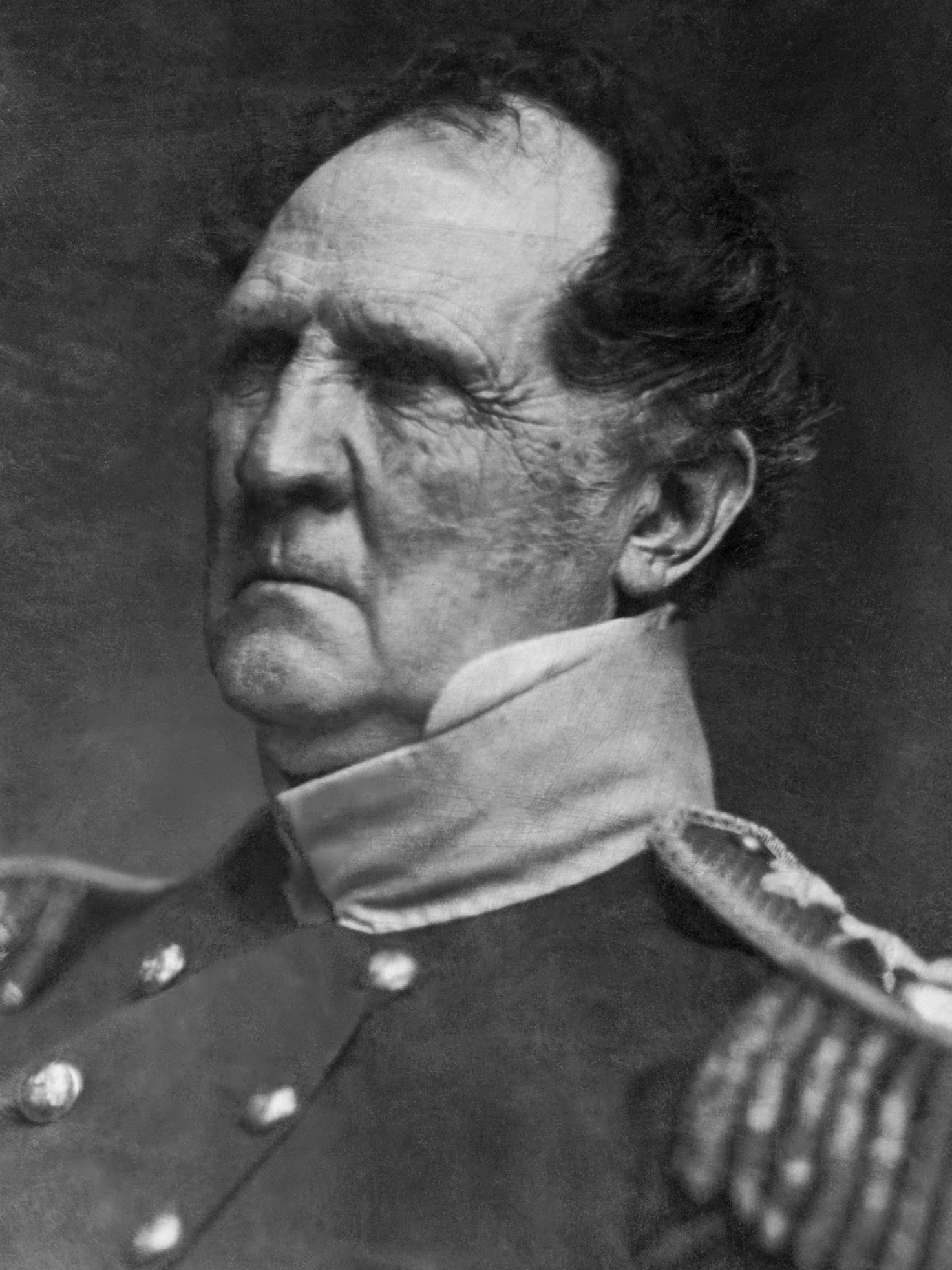

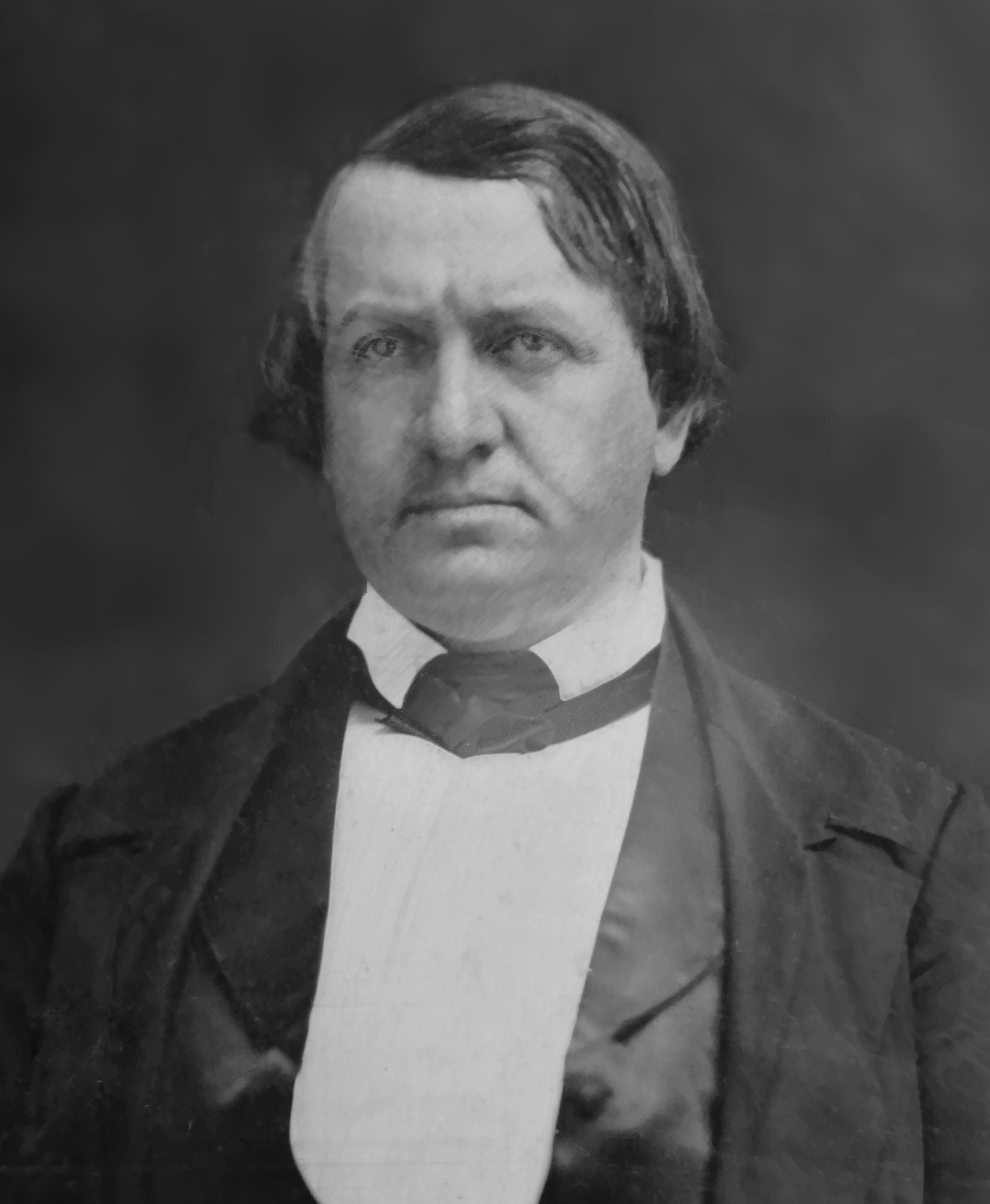
Nominee	Winfield Scott	Franklin Pierce	John P. Hale
Party	Whig	Democratic	Free Soil
Home state	New Jersey	New Hampshire	New Hampshire
Running mate	William Alexander Graham	William R. King	George W. Julian
Electoral vote	5	0	0
Popular vote	22,173	13,044	8,621
Percentage	50.52%	29.72%	19.64%

Scott
30–40%
40–50%
50–60%
60–70%
70–80%
80–90%
90–100%
Pierce
30–40%
40–50%
50–60%
60–70%
90–100%
Hale
30–40%
40–50%
50–60%
60–70%
80–90%
Tie
40–50%
50%
No vote
President before election
Millard Fillmore
Whig
Elected President
Franklin Pierce
Democratic

The 1852 United States presidential election in Vermont took place on November 2, 1852, as part of the 1852 United States presidential election. Voters chose five representatives, or electors to the Electoral College, who voted for President and Vice President.

Vermont voted for the Whig Party candidate, Winfield Scott, over the Democratic candidate, Franklin Pierce. Scott won the state by a margin of 20.8%. This would be the last election until 1916 where a Democratic candidate won more than 40% of the vote in a Vermont county.

Vermont was one of only four states to vote for Scott. The other three were neighboring Massachusetts, Kentucky, and Tennessee.

With 50.52% of the popular vote, Vermont would prove to be Scott's third strongest state after Kentucky and Tennessee. It was also Scott's strongest state by margin by victory.

Free Soil Party candidate John P. Hale won 19.64% of the popular vote in the state, making Vermont his second strongest state after neighboring Massachusetts. Lamoille County was won by Hale, which would make him the final third-party candidate to win a single county in Vermont until Progressive Party candidate Theodore Roosevelt won six counties in 1912.

After this election, Vermont would vote for the nominee of the Republican Party, which would be formed in 1854, for 27 consecutive elections, from 1856 through 1960—as of 2024, still the most of any state.

== Results ==
1852 United States presidential election in Vermont
Party	Candidate	Votes	Percentage	Electoral votes
Whig	Winfield Scott	22,173	50.52%	5
Democratic	Franklin Pierce	13,044	29.72%	0
Free Soil	John P. Hale	8,621	19.64%	0
None	Write-ins	52	0.12%	0
Totals		43,890	100%	5

== See also ==
- United States presidential elections in Vermont
