= Johnson County, Tennessee =

County in Tennessee, United States

- County
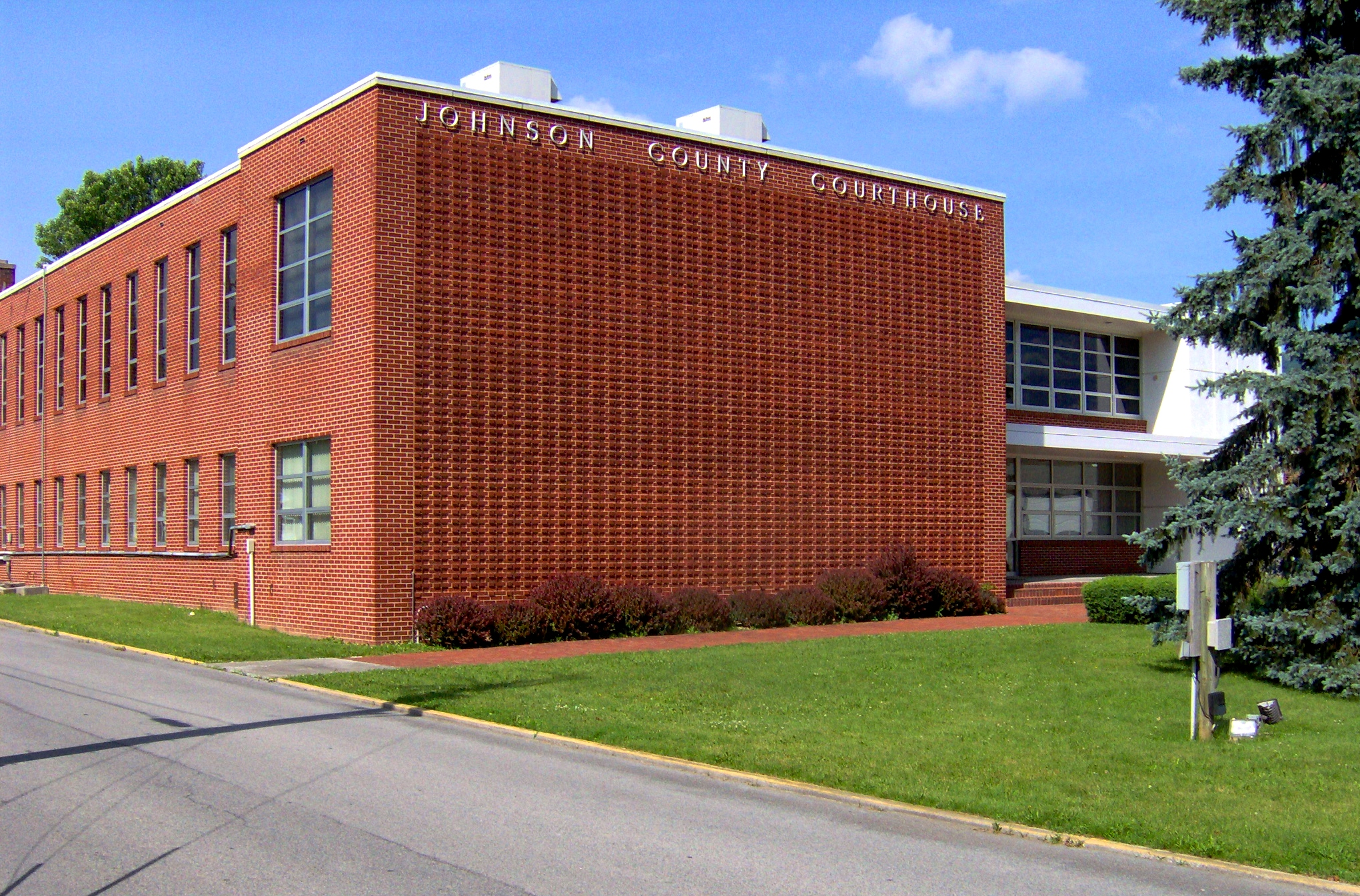
- Johnson County Courthouse in Mountain City

- Flag Seal

- Location within the U.S. state of Tennessee
- Coordinates: 36°28′N 81°52′W
- Country: United States
- State: Tennessee
- Founded: 1836
- Named for: Thomas Johnson, early settler
- Seat: Mountain City
- Largest town: Mountain City

Area
  - Total: 303 sq mi (780 km^{2})
  - Land: 298 sq mi (770 km^{2})
  - Water: 4.2 sq mi (11 km^{2}) 1.4%

Population (2020)
  - Total: 17,948
  - Estimate (2025): 18,718 ▲
  - Density: 61/sq mi (24/km^{2})
- Time zone: UTC−5 (Eastern)
  - Summer (DST): UTC−4 (EDT)
- Congressional district: 1st
- Website: https://www.johnsoncountytn.gov/

Johnson County is the easternmost county in the U.S. state of Tennessee. As of the 2020 census, the population was 17,948. Its county seat is Mountain City.

== History ==
Johnson County was created in 1836 from parts of Carter County. This followed several years of bickering over the location of Carter County's seat, with residents of what is now Johnson County arguing that travel to Elizabethton was too lengthy and difficult. When their petition to move the seat to a more central location was rejected, they petitioned the state legislature for the creation of a new county. The new county was named after Thomas Johnson, an early settler. The county seat was initially named "Taylorsville" in honor of Colonel James P. Taylor (it was changed to "Mountain City" in the 1880s).

Most Johnson Countians supported the Union during the Civil War. The county's residents rejected secession by a margin of 788 to 111 in Tennessee's secession referendum on June 8, 1861. The county sent a sizable delegation to the Greeneville session of the pro-Union East Tennessee Convention in June 1861.

Due in large part to the county's remoteness, the railroads did not reach Johnson until the early 20th century. The arrival of the railroads during this period aided the development of the timber and manganese mining industries.

== Geography ==
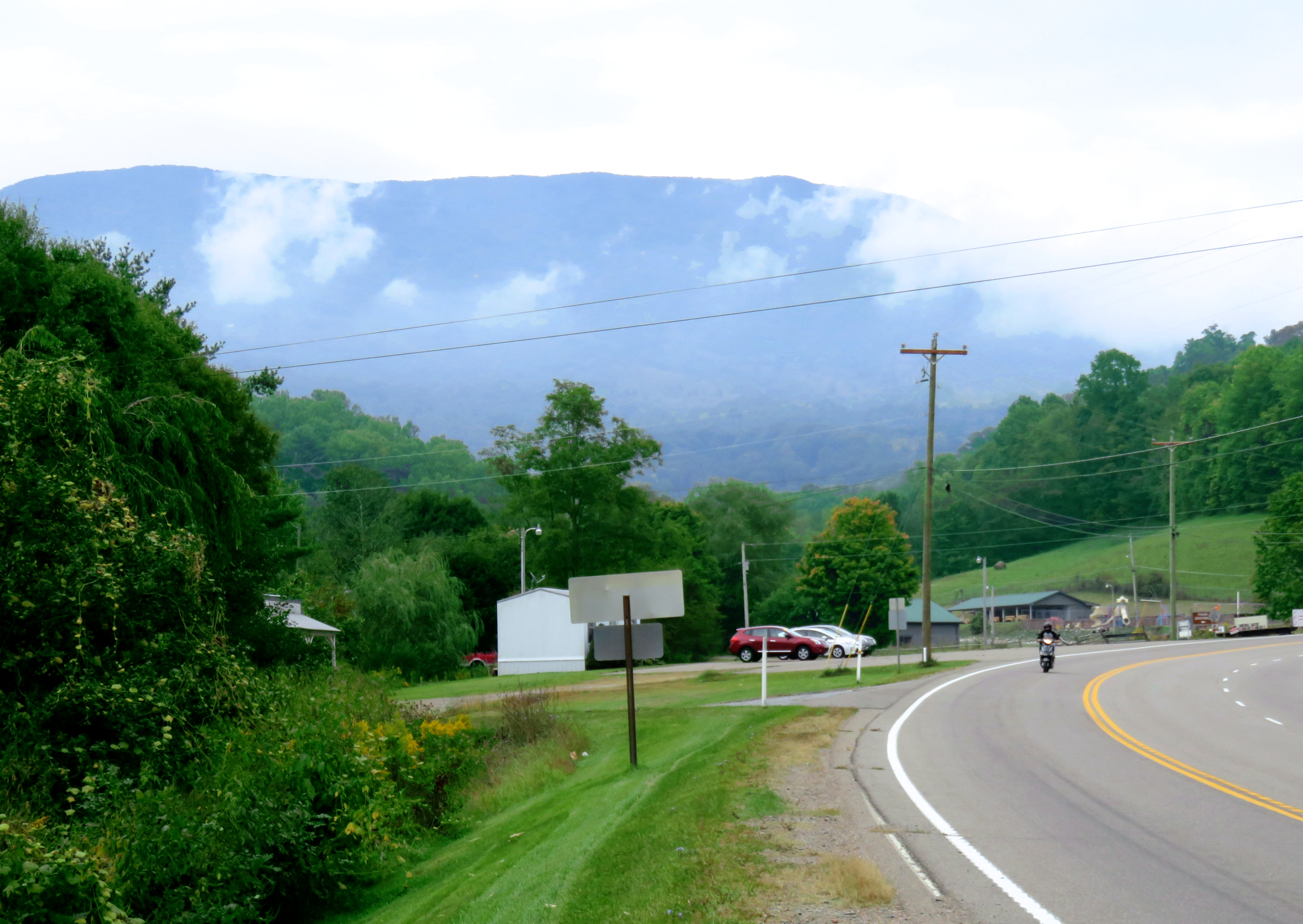
Snake Mountain, viewed from Trade

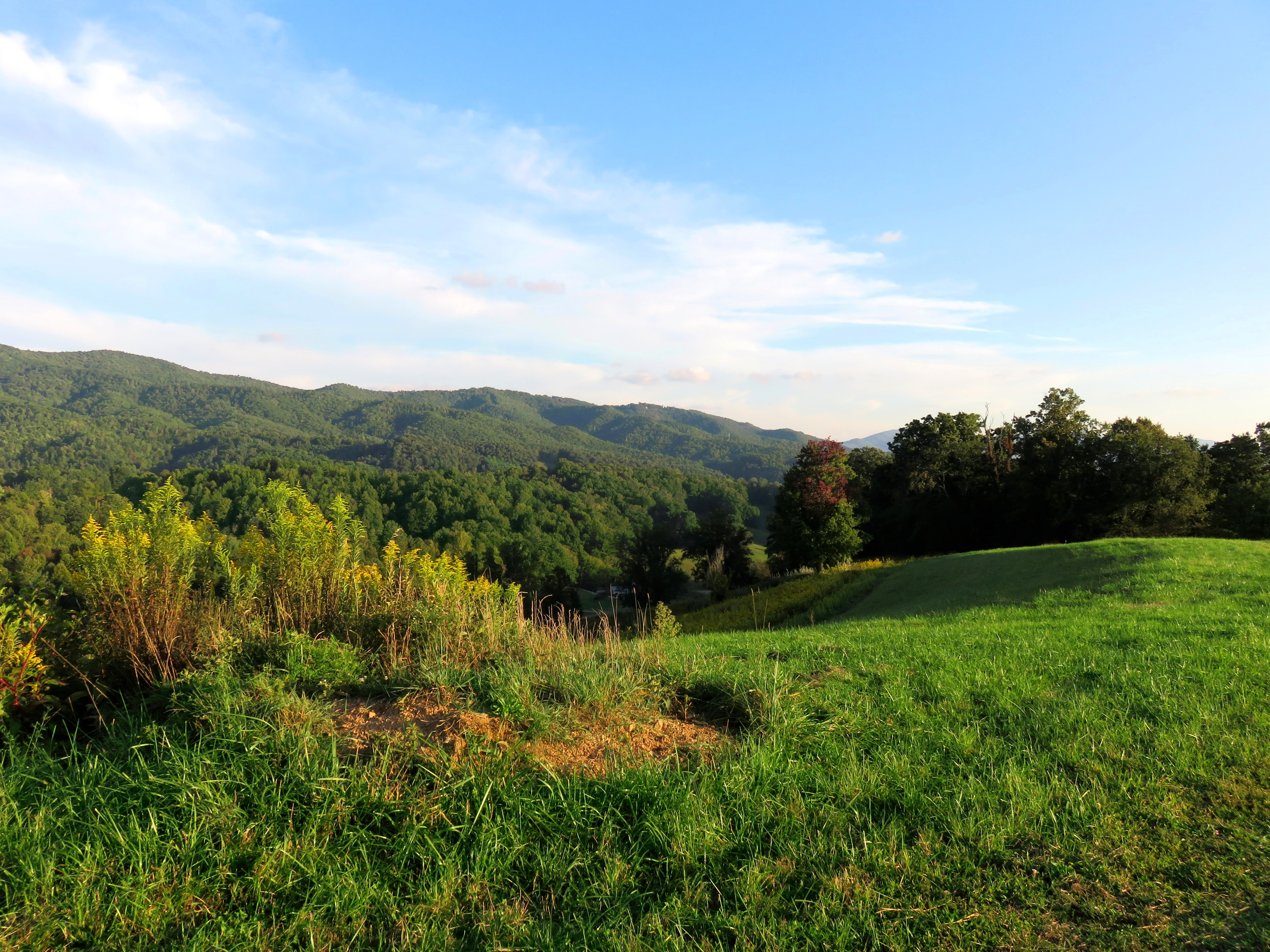
Mountainous terrain near Laurel Bloomery

According to the U.S. Census Bureau, the county has a total area of 303 square miles (780 km^{2}), of which 298 square miles (770 km^{2}) is land and 4.2 square miles (11 km^{2}) (1.4%) is water.

Situated entirely within the Blue Ridge Mountains, Johnson County is relatively rugged and hilly. The county's boundary with Sullivan County to the northwest is defined as the ridgeline of Holston Mountain, while the Iron Mountains provide the county's boundary with Carter County to the southwest. Snake Mountain, at 5,574 feet (1,699 m), is the county's highest point.

=== High elevation ===
In terms of average elevation, Johnson County is one of the highest counties (if not the highest) in Tennessee. The county is home to the two highest communities in the state: Trade, at 3,133 feet (955 m), and Shady Valley, at 2,785 feet (849 m). Mountain City is the highest incorporated city in Tennessee, at 2,418 feet (737 m). The highest place in Johnson County is Snake Mountain's lower peak, (near the North Carolina state line), at 5,518 feet (1,682 m). The lowest point in the county is Watauga Lake, at an elevation of 1,959 feet (597 m).

=== Lake ===
- Watauga Lake

=== Adjacent counties ===
- Washington County, Virginia (north)
- Grayson County, Virginia (northeast)
- Ashe County, North Carolina (east)
- Watauga County, North Carolina (southeast)
- Avery County, North Carolina (south)
- Carter County (southwest)
- Sullivan County (west)

=== National protected areas ===
- Appalachian Trail (part)
- Cherokee National Forest (part)

== Demographics ==
Historical population
Census	Pop.	Note	%±
1840	2,658		—
1850	3,705		39.4%
1860	5,018		35.4%
1870	5,852		16.6%
1880	7,766		32.7%
1890	8,858		14.1%
1900	10,589		19.5%
1910	13,191		24.6%
1920	12,230		−7.3%
1930	12,209		−0.2%
1940	12,998		6.5%
1950	12,278		−5.5%
1960	10,765		−12.3%
1970	11,569		7.5%
1980	13,745		18.8%
1990	13,766		0.2%
2000	17,499		27.1%
2010	18,244		4.3%
2020	17,948		−1.6%
2025 (est.)	18,718	▲	4.3%
U.S. Decennial Census; 1790-1960 1900-1990; 1990-2000 2010-2014

=== Racial and ethnic composition ===
Johnson County, Tennessee – Racial and ethnic composition Note: the US Census treats Hispanic/Latino as an ethnic category. This table excludes Latinos from the racial categories and assigns them to a separate category. Hispanics/Latinos may be of any race.
Race / ethnicity (NH = Non-Hispanic)	Pop 1980	Pop 1990	Pop 2000	Pop 2010	Pop 2020	% 1980	% 1990	% 2000	% 2010	% 2020
White alone (NH)	13,544	13,644	16,761	17,373	16,126	98.54%	99.11%	95.78%	95.23%	89.85%
Black or African American alone (NH)	86	61	420	373	724	0.63%	0.44%	2.40%	2.04%	4.03%
Native American or Alaska Native alone (NH)	8	14	59	32	28	0.06%	0.10%	0.34%	0.18%	0.16%
Asian alone (NH)	21	14	21	35	27	0.15%	0.10%	0.12%	0.19%	0.15%
Native Hawaiian or Pacific Islander alone (NH)	x	x	3	3	9	x	x	0.02%	0.02%	0.05%
Other race alone (NH)	5	1	10	2	8	0.04%	0.01%	0.06%	0.01%	0.04%
Mixed race or Multiracial (NH)	x	x	75	157	510	x	x	0.43%	0.86%	2.84%
Hispanic or Latino (any race)	81	32	150	269	516	0.59%	0.23%	0.86%	1.47%	2.87%
Total	13,745	13,766	17,499	18,244	17,948	100.00%	100.00%	100.00%	100.00%	100.00%

=== 2020 census ===
As of the 2020 census, there were 17,948 people, 7,205 households, and 4,635 families residing in the county. The median age was 47.6 years; 17.5% of residents were under the age of 18 and 23.9% of residents were 65 years of age or older. For every 100 females there were 118.8 males, and for every 100 females age 18 and over there were 119.7 males age 18 and over.

The racial makeup of the county was 90.4% White, 4.1% Black or African American, 0.3% American Indian and Alaska Native, 0.2% Asian, 0.1% Native Hawaiian and Pacific Islander, 1.4% from some other race, and 3.6% from two or more races; Hispanic or Latino residents of any race comprised 2.9% of the population.

<0.1% of residents lived in urban areas, while 100.0% lived in rural areas.

There were 7,205 households in the county, of which 23.6% had children under the age of 18 living in them. Of all households, 45.1% were married-couple households, 20.8% were households with a male householder and no spouse or partner present, and 27.9% were households with a female householder and no spouse or partner present. About 32.7% of all households were made up of individuals and 16.6% had someone living alone who was 65 years of age or older.

There were 8,723 housing units, of which 17.4% were vacant. Among occupied housing units, 75.0% were owner-occupied and 25.0% were renter-occupied. The homeowner vacancy rate was 1.6% and the rental vacancy rate was 6.9%.

=== 2000 census ===
As of the census of 2000, there were 17,499 people, 6,827 households, and 4,751 families residing in the county. The population density was 59 people per square mile (23 people/km^{2}). There were 7,879 housing units at an average density of 26 units per square mile (10/km^{2}). The racial makeup of the county was 96.40% White, 2.42% Black or African American, 0.34% Native American, 0.12% Asian, 0.02% Pacific Islander, 0.23% from other races, and 0.46% from two or more races. 0.86% of the population were Hispanic or Latino of any race.

There were 6,827 households, out of which 26.40% had children under the age of 18 living with them, 55.40% were married couples living together, 10.00% had a female householder with no husband present, and 30.40% were non-families. 26.40% of all households were made up of individuals, and 11.50% had someone living alone who was 65 years of age or older. The average household size was 2.35 and the average family size was 2.81.

In the county, the population was spread out, with 19.70% under the age of 18, 7.40% from 18 to 24, 30.80% from 25 to 44, 27.10% from 45 to 64, and 15.00% who were 65 years of age or older. The median age was 40 years. For every 100 females there were 114.60 males. For every 100 females age 18 and over, there were 114.40 males.

The median income for a household in the county was $23,067, and the median income for a family was $28,400. Males had a median income of $24,018 versus $18,817 for females. The per capita income for the county was $13,388. About 18.70% of families and 22.60% of the population were below the poverty line, including 26.80% of those under age 18 and 21.50% of those age 65 or over.

Male inmates in the Northeast Correctional Complex, southwest of Mountain City, account for 1,299 (7.4%) of the county's population.

== Communities ==
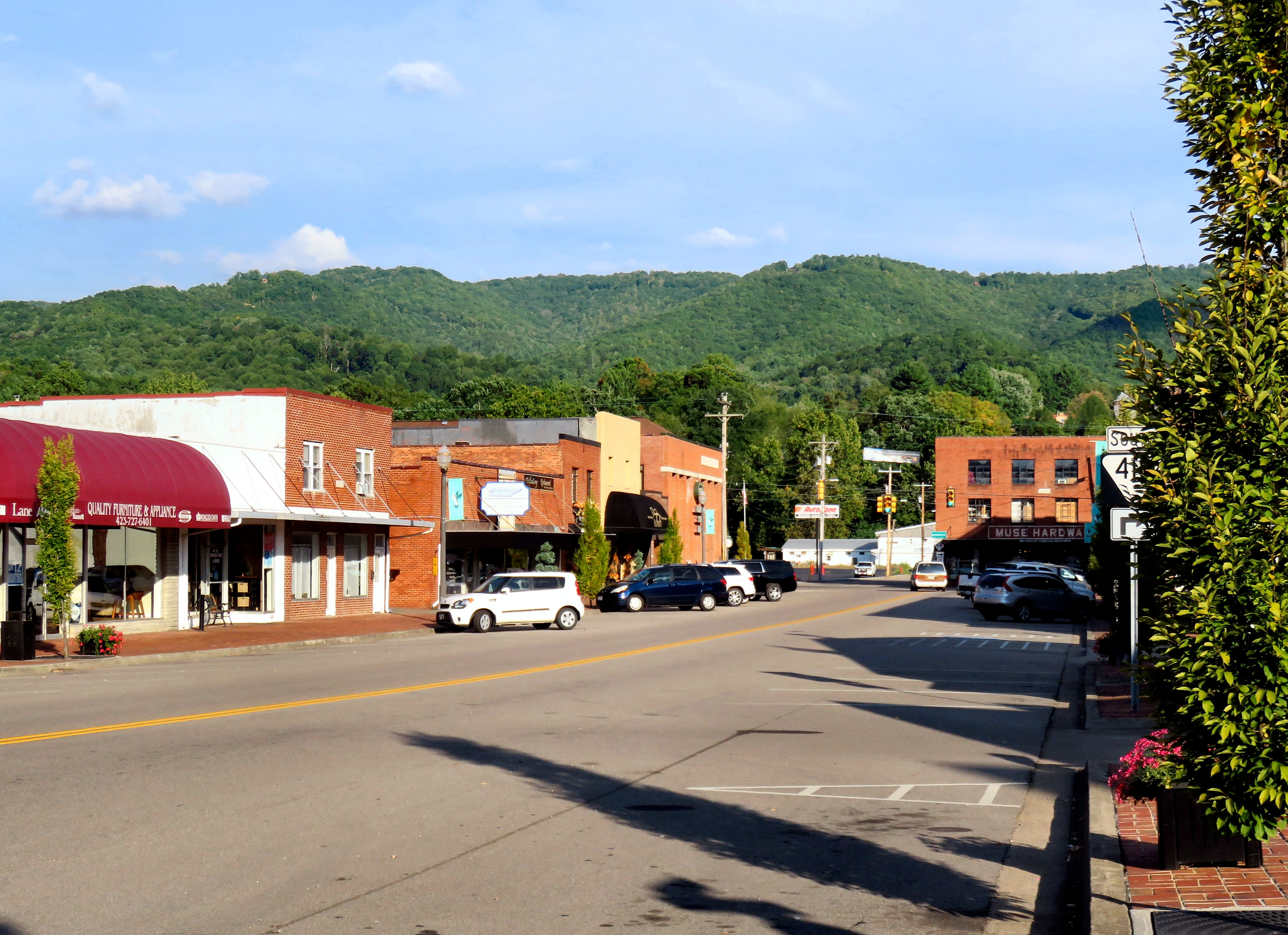
Mountain City

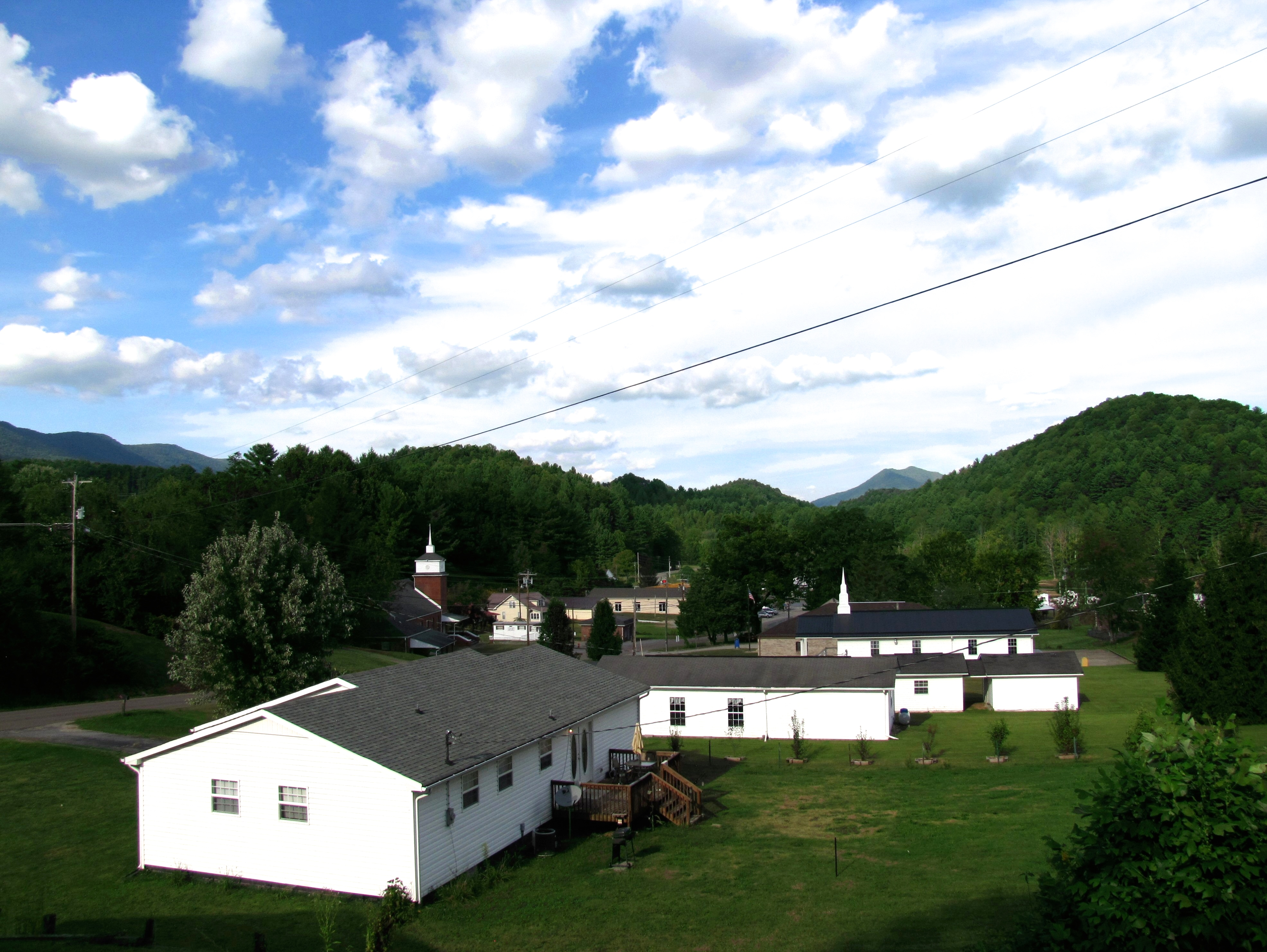
Butler

=== Town ===
- Mountain City (county seat)

=== Census-designated place ===
- Butler

=== Unincorporated communities ===
- Crandull
- Doe Valley
- Doeville
- Laurel Bloomery
- Midway
- Shady Valley
- Sutherland
- Trade

== Politics ==
United States presidential election results for Johnson County, Tennessee
Year	Republican		Democratic		Third party(ies)	
Year	No.	%	No.	%	No.	%
1840	390	88.84%	49	11.16%	0	0.00%
1844	370	82.41%	79	17.59%	0	0.00%
1848	382	85.27%	66	14.73%	0	0.00%
1852	365	79.69%	93	20.31%	0	0.00%
1856	0	0.00%	178	27.94%	459	72.06%
1860	0	0.00%	144	22.09%	508	77.91%
1868	501	99.80%	1	0.20%	0	0.00%
1872	778	93.17%	57	6.83%	0	0.00%
1876	717	77.77%	205	22.23%	0	0.00%
1880	1,092	84.32%	203	15.68%	0	0.00%
1884	1,101	85.81%	179	13.95%	3	0.23%
1888	1,347	87.52%	180	11.70%	12	0.78%
1892	1,100	78.46%	209	14.91%	93	6.63%
1896	1,683	88.02%	224	11.72%	5	0.26%
1900	1,618	89.20%	189	10.42%	7	0.39%
1904	1,769	88.49%	219	10.96%	11	0.55%
1908	2,148	90.21%	232	9.74%	1	0.04%
1912	933	42.14%	256	11.56%	1,025	46.30%
1916	1,812	87.33%	263	12.67%	0	0.00%
1920	3,627	92.57%	291	7.43%	0	0.00%
1924	2,799	91.35%	254	8.29%	11	0.36%
1928	3,057	93.97%	196	6.03%	0	0.00%
1932	2,400	84.51%	425	14.96%	15	0.53%
1936	2,882	84.39%	533	15.61%	0	0.00%
1940	2,502	84.21%	469	15.79%	0	0.00%
1944	2,699	85.47%	450	14.25%	9	0.28%
1948	2,413	82.98%	433	14.89%	62	2.13%
1952	3,590	87.65%	506	12.35%	0	0.00%
1956	3,690	87.44%	503	11.92%	27	0.64%
1960	3,854	86.74%	571	12.85%	18	0.41%
1964	2,889	75.71%	927	24.29%	0	0.00%
1968	3,107	79.02%	450	11.44%	375	9.54%
1972	3,362	87.08%	450	11.66%	49	1.27%
1976	2,986	66.68%	1,464	32.69%	28	0.63%
1980	3,716	74.99%	1,141	23.03%	98	1.98%
1984	3,853	79.10%	999	20.51%	19	0.39%
1988	3,715	73.14%	1,329	26.17%	35	0.69%
1992	3,170	56.98%	1,781	32.02%	612	11.00%
1996	3,137	58.54%	1,698	31.69%	524	9.78%
2000	3,740	66.11%	1,813	32.05%	104	1.84%
2004	4,634	71.51%	1,812	27.96%	34	0.52%
2008	4,621	70.11%	1,837	27.87%	133	2.02%
2012	4,611	74.44%	1,483	23.94%	100	1.61%
2016	5,410	82.23%	988	15.02%	181	2.75%
2020	6,468	82.91%	1,246	15.97%	87	1.12%
2024	6,829	84.12%	1,212	14.93%	77	0.95%

Johnson County is a long-term Republican stronghold and is located within Tennessee's 1st congressional district, which has not been represented by a Democrat since 1881. Johnson County has never been carried by a Democratic presidential nominee. Since a Republican Party presidential nominee first appeared on the ballot in Tennessee in 1868, there has only been one occasion when Johnson County's voters didn't vote for the official Republican Party candidate, and that was in 1912, when voters voted for the official Bull Moose Progressive Party candidate, Theodore Roosevelt, the former Republican president of the United States from 1901 to 1909. Johnson County's voters chose Roosevelt in 1912 rather than the man who was then the incumbent Republican president of the United States, William Howard Taft (president of the United States from 1909 to 1913).

Johnson County was reportedly the strongest county in the US for Republican candidates Calvin Coolidge in 1924, Herbert Hoover in 1932 and the second strongest behind Jackson County, Kentucky for Alf Landon in 1936. The Republican candidate has consistently won since 1916, during which period no Republican candidate has received less than 56 percent of the county's vote. In 2012, Mitt Romney received 74.4 percent, while Donald Trump received 82.2 percent in 2016, 82.9 percent in 2020, and then 84.3 percent in 2024.

== In popular culture ==
Steve Earle's song "Copperhead Road" is about a family of moonshiners from Johnson County – where, until 2018, alcohol was prohibited ever since the Twenty-First Amendment. The second verse contains the line "Johnson County Sheriff painted on the side".

The childhood home of Valene Ewing, a character in the TV series Dallas and Knots Landing, is in Johnson County, in the fictional community of Shula.

== See also ==
- National Register of Historic Places listings in Johnson County, Tennessee
- RedTail Mountain Resort, a luxury inn and country club in Mountain City
- North Carolina–Tennessee–Virginia Corners
