= Sutherland, Tennessee =

- Unincorporated community
- Location within Tennessee Location within the United States
- Coordinates: 36°36′15″N 81°48′36″W
- Country: United States
- State: Tennessee
- County: Johnson
- Elevation: 2,090 ft (640 m)
- Time zone: UTC-5 (Eastern (EST))
  - Summer (DST): UTC-4 (EDT)
- Area code: 423
- GNIS feature ID: 1327166

Sutherland is an unincorporated community in Johnson County, Tennessee, United States. Sutherland is located .6 miles (0.97 km) south of the border with Virginia on Tennessee State Route 133.
