= Iron Mountains =

Mountain range of the Appalachian mountains

Coordinates: 36.72°N 81.48°W

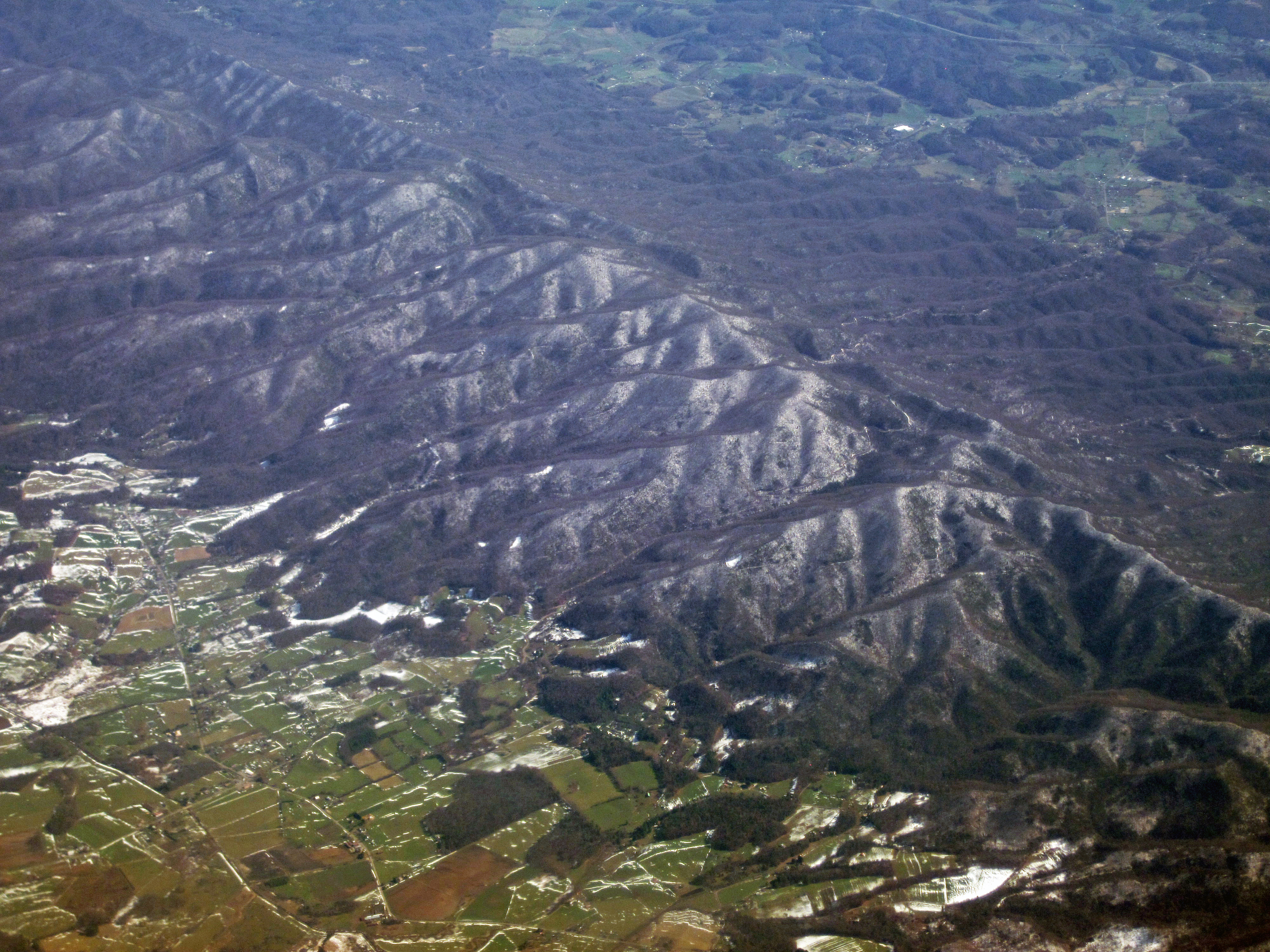
The Iron Mountains in Tennessee

The Iron Mountains are a subrange of the Blue Ridge Mountains. These mountains are located around the common meeting point of Tennessee, Virginia, and North Carolina.

A portion of the Appalachian Trail runs the crest of the Iron Mountains above Watauga Lake and the Watauga River near Elizabethton, Tennessee, and then runs northeasterly by Shady Valley, Tennessee, finally ascending Holston Mountain and into Virginia. In addition, the historic Virginia Creeper Trail traverses the Iron Mountains between Damascus and Whitetop, Virginia. Popular trails include, the Appalachian trail, the Virginia Creeper trail, and the Iron Mountain trail.

== Topography and Geology ==
The subrange has many peaks such as Iron Mountains Peak at 4'406 ft (1,343 m) and Grave Mountain, its highest point at 5,052 ft (1,540 m). The rock within the Iron Mountains vary from the dolomites and limestones of the Elkbrook Formation to the Knobs Formation which includes Ordovician sandstones and conglomerates. As the name would suggest there's also iron alongside manganese.

== Ecology ==
The mountains are mostly home to Oak trees, however some fir forests exist in the higher portions. In terms of animals, there are coyotes, deer, beavers, black bears, and more.

== See also ==
- Mountain City, Tennessee
- Johnson County, Tennessee
- Whitetop, Virginia
- Grayson County, Virginia
- Washington County, Virginia
- Elizabethton, Tennessee
- Carter County, Tennessee
- Roan Mountain, Tennessee
