= Whitetop, Virginia =

Unincorporated community in Virginia, United States

Coordinates: 36°36′05″N 81°37′32″W

Whitetop is an unincorporated community in Grayson County, Virginia, United States. It is the southern terminus of the Virginia Creeper Trail. Whitetop is named for nearby Whitetop Mountain, the second-tallest independent mountain in the State of Virginia, behind Mount Rogers. The town is approximately four miles northeast of the North Carolina–Tennessee–Virginia Corners.
