= United States v. Post =

- Supreme Court of the United States

Decided March 13, 1893
- Full case name: United States v. Post

Court membership
- Chief Justice Melville Fuller Associate Justices Stephen J. Field · John M. Harlan; Horace Gray · Samuel Blatchford; David J. Brewer · Henry B. Brown; George Shiras Jr. · Howell E. Jackson

On March 13, 1893, the Supreme Court of the United States decided on the case United States v. Post, 148 U.S. 124 through a 7-0 ruling that affirmed the ruling of the lower court. Originating from the U.S. Court of Claims, Court of Federal Claims, the case resulted in the precedent that postal letter carriers mandated to work more than eight hours a day were entitled, by federal law, for extra pay.

== Background ==
The original petition filed March 26, 1891, the suit was brought in the court of claims by Aaron S. Post against the United States. On May 23, 1891, a traverse of the petition was filed in addition to an amended petition on January 11, 1892, where it was established that Post was a letter carrier of Salt Lake City, Utah, that claimed that he was entitled to extra pay for the extra hours he completed beyond the standard of eight paid hour. Previously, eight other cases were tried with petitions in the same form, though claiming various amounts—but all claimants were also letter carriers of similar complaints.
