= 1852 United States presidential election in Tennessee =

- November 2, 1852
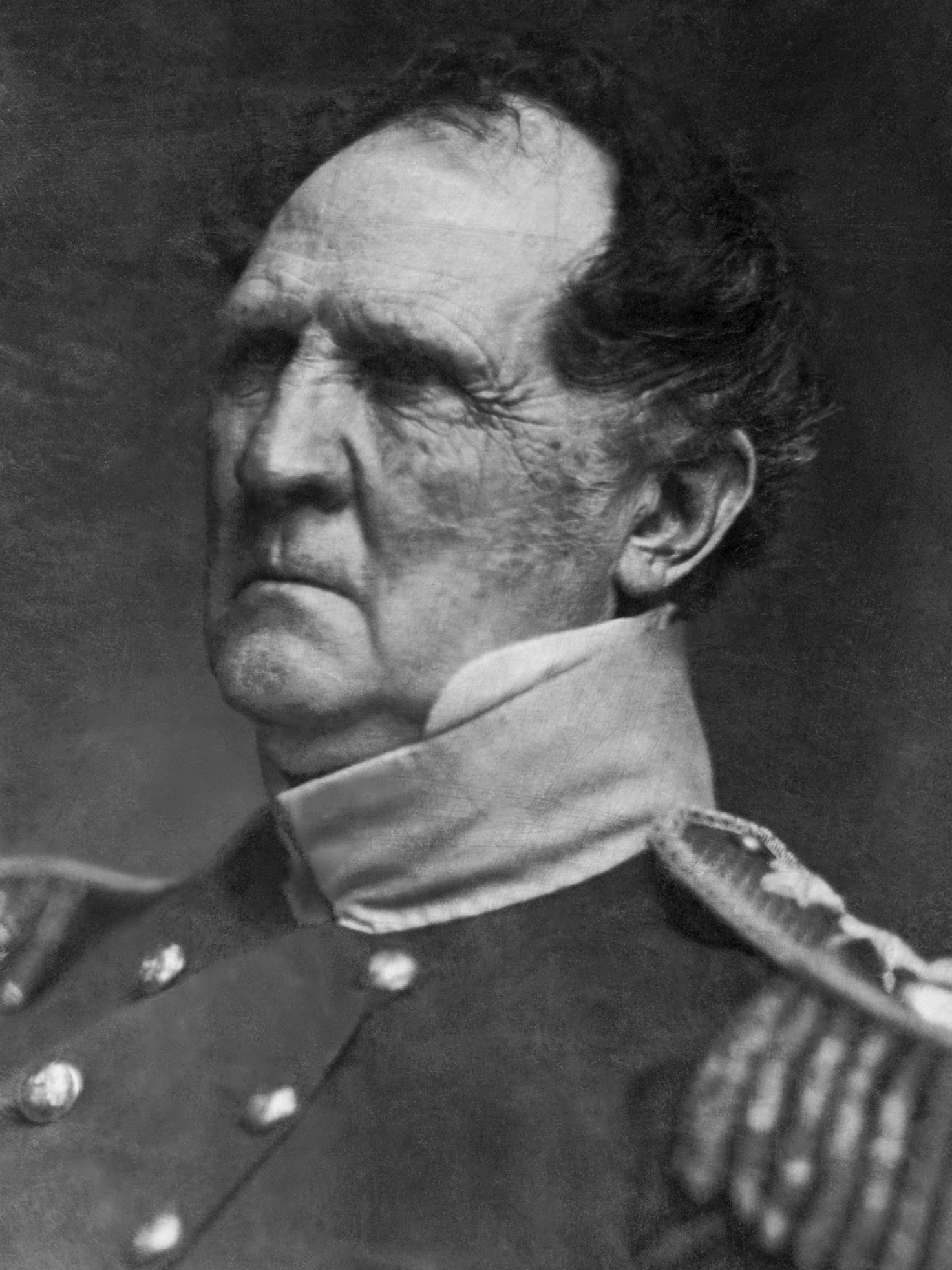

Nominee	Winfield Scott	Franklin Pierce
Party	Whig	Democratic
Home state	New Jersey	New Hampshire
Running mate	William Alexander Graham	William R. King
Electoral vote	12	0
Popular vote	58,586	56,900
Percentage	50.73%	49.27%
County results
Scott
50–60%
60–70%
70–80%
80–90%
Pierce
50–60%
60–70%
70–80%
80–90%
President before election
Millard Fillmore
Whig
Elected President
Franklin Pierce
Democratic

The 1852 United States presidential election in Tennessee took place on November 2, 1852, as part of the 1852 United States presidential election. Voters chose twelve representatives, or electors to the Electoral College, who voted for President and Vice President.

Tennessee voted for the Whig candidate, Winfield Scott, over Democratic candidate Franklin Pierce.

Tennessee was one of the four states to vote for Scott in the 1852 election with the other three being Kentucky, Massachusetts and Vermont.

Despite Scott winning the state by a narrow margin of 1.46%, Tennessee would prove to be Scott's second strongest state in the nation after Kentucky.

== Results ==
1852 United States presidential election in Tennessee
Party	Candidate	Running mate	Popular vote		Electoral vote	
Party	Candidate	Running mate	Count	%	Count	%
Whig	Winfield Scott of New Jersey	William Alexander Graham of North Carolina	58,586	50.73%	12	100.00%
Democratic	Franklin Pierce of New Hampshire	William R. King of Alabama	56,900	49.27%	0	0.00%
Total			115,486	100.00%	12	100.00%

== See also ==
- United States presidential elections in Tennessee
