= Shady Valley, Tennessee =

Shady Valley
- Unincorporated community
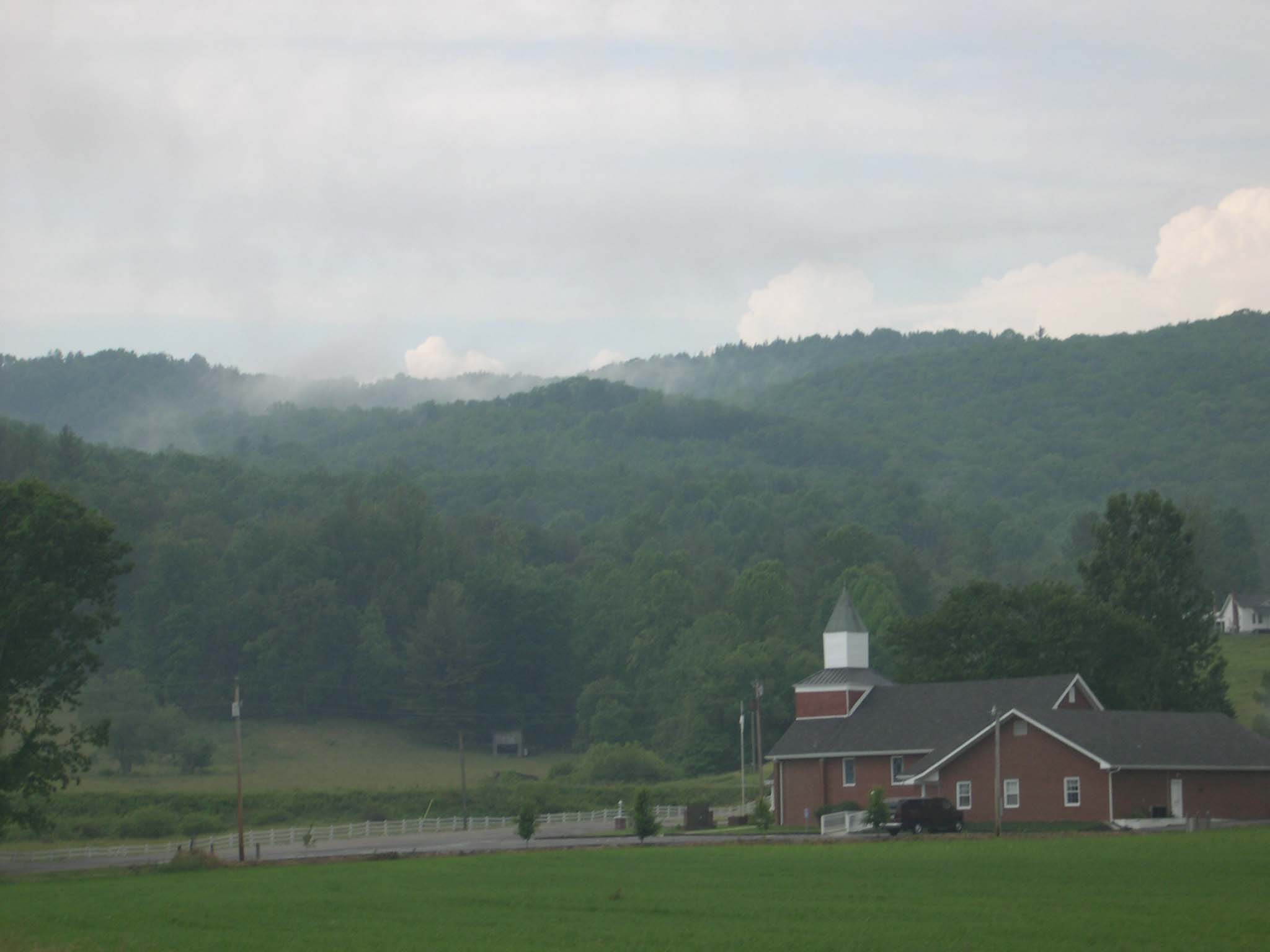
- A church sits among the mountains of Shady Valley.

- Location within Tennessee Location within the United States
- Coordinates: 36°31′09″N 81°55′40″W
- Country: United States
- State: Tennessee
- County: Johnson County
- Elevation: 2,785 ft (849 m)
- Time zone: UTC-5 (Eastern (EST))
  - Summer (DST): UTC-4 (EDT)
- ZIP code: 37688
- Area code: 423
- FIPS code: 47-67460
- GNIS feature ID: 1301197

Shady Valley is an unincorporated community in Johnson County, in the northeastern corner of the U.S. state of Tennessee. It is just outside Cherokee National Forest. Shady Valley is also the name of the valley in which the town is located, between Holston Mountain on the northwest, and the Iron Mountains to the southeast. At 2,785 feet, it is the second-highest community in Tennessee.

One member of the House of Representatives, Roy P. Blevins, lived in Shady Valley during his tenure.

== Natural history ==
After the Pleistocene ice ages, species and ecosystems that had shifted southward often survived in local refugia. As a result, cold-adapted ecosystems, such as cranberry bogs, remain in Shady Valley, far south of their usual range.

Shady Valley once contained an estimated 10,000 acres (40 km^{2}) of boreal cranberry bogs. It is also home to white pine forests, which have become less common; the community's growing population between the 1930s and 1950s led to fewer areas for the natural ecosystem to survive.

In 1979, The Nature Conservancy purchased a reserve in Shady Valley. It was the first of a few purchases by the organization. Currently, The Nature Conservancy has four nature preserves that total to over 400 acres. They created a field station used by partner organizations and scientists.

In 2000, Shady Valley was being considered as an addition to the National Register of Historic Places. In 2001, Shady Valley was named as a community within vicinity of federal land that was at high risk of wildfire.

== Recreation ==
The roads that run in and around the town are popular among motorcyclists since nearby mountains provide nearly 500 switchback curves to navigate. The most popular road for motorcyclists is US-421, which offers many challenging curves.

== Economy ==
Until the early 1900s, Shady Valley lacked railroad transport which limited economic opportunities. After the construction of rail, the community had an increase in the development of timber and manganese mining industries.

Shady Valley has one small general store, a locally owned restaurant, the "Raceway Grill", a post office, and until 2020, Shady Valley Elementary School, now closed. It has a volunteer fire department.

The town holds its annual Cranberry Festival the second weekend in October with food, a parade, and auctions.

== See also ==
- Laurel Bloomery, Tennessee
