= U.S. Route 19 =

Highway in the United States

U.S. Route 19
- US 19 highlighted in red

Route information
- Length: 1,438.2 mi (2,314.6 km)
- Existed: 1926–present

Major junctions
- South end: US 41 in Memphis, FL
- I-10 near Monticello, FL; I-20 / I-75 / I-85 in Atlanta, GA; I-26 / I-40 in Asheville, NC; I-81 in Bristol, VA; I-64 / I-77 near Beckley, WV; I-79 at various locations; I-70 in Washington, PA; I-76 in Cranberry Township, PA; I-80 near Mercer, PA; I-90 near Erie, PA
- North end: US 20 in Erie, PA

Location
- Country: United States
- States: Florida, Georgia, North Carolina, Tennessee, Virginia, West Virginia, Pennsylvania

Highway system
- United States Numbered Highway System; List; Special; Divided
← US 18	US	→ US 20
← WV 18	WV	→ WV 20

U.S. Route 19 or U.S. Highway 19 (US 19) is a north–south United States Numbered Highway in the Eastern United States. Despite encroaching Interstate Highways, the route has remained a long-haul road, connecting the Gulf of Mexico with Lake Erie.

The highway's southern terminus is at Memphis, Florida, which is just south of St. Petersburg at an intersection with US 41. Its northern terminus is in Erie, Pennsylvania, at an intersection with US 20 about two miles (3.2 km) from the shores of Lake Erie.

The length of the highway is 1,438.2 miles (2,314.6 km), including both US 19E/US 19W paths through North Carolina and Tennessee.

== Route description ==
Lengths
	mi	km
FL	262.0	421.6
GA	348.0	560.1
NC	145.0	233.4
19E	75.9	122.1
19W	62.6	100.7
TN	11.8	19.0
VA	88.9	143.1
WV	249.0	400.7
PA	195.0	313.8
Total	1,438.2	2,314.6

=== Florida ===
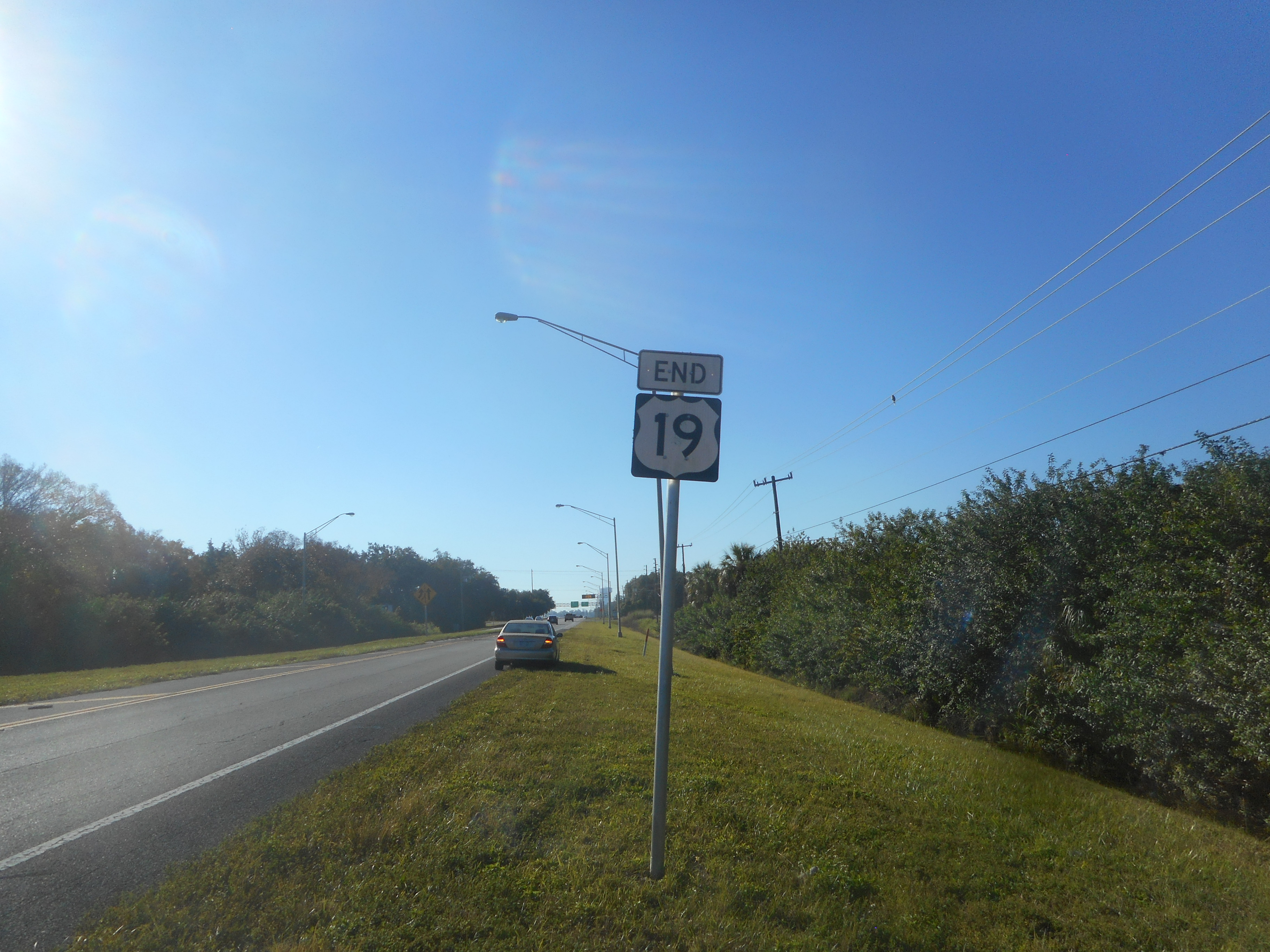
Southern terminus of US 19 at US 41 in Memphis, Florida

US 19 Florida red shield (1956–1993)

US 19 runs 262 miles (422 km) along Florida's west coast from an interchange with US 41 in Memphis, south of St. Petersburg, and continues to the Georgia border north of Monticello. US 19 remains independent of Interstate 75 (I-75), even as the routes converge in the Tampa Bay area. The route is cosigned with I-275 over the Sunshine Skyway Bridge, a cable-stayed bridge over the mouth of Tampa Bay, US 98 between the Chassahowitzka National Wildlife Refuge and Perry, US 27 Alternate (US 27 Alt.) between Chiefland and Perry, and US 27 between and Perry and Capps.

The unsigned designation for US 19 in Florida, between Memphis and Perry, is State Road 55 (SR 55). Between Perry and Capps, it follows SR 20, and, between Capps and the Georgia border, it follows SR 57.

According to a 2005 Dateline NBC report, part of US 19 in Florida may be the most dangerous road in the U.S. A Highway Patrol test period beginning in 1998 and ending in 2003, as mandated by the National Highway Traffic Safety Administration, showed the stretch of US 19 from Pasco to Pinellas county to average approximately 52 deaths a year, or 262 deaths in the five-year duration of the study; 100 of these deaths were pedestrian related, making US 19 the worst road to walk on in these two counties. Multiple efforts to improve US 19 have been suggested to the Florida Department of Transportation, among them, an overpass strictly for left-turn lanes.

Currently, US 19 between Clearwater and St. Petersburg is getting a freeway-style upgrade due to the cancelation of an extension of I-375 in the late 1970s.

=== Georgia ===
US 19 enters Georgia just south of Thomasville as Lee Highway, concurrent with State Route 3 (SR 3). It continues north, passing through Albany, Americus, Ellaville, Butler, Thomaston, and Zebulon. It becomes concurrent with US 41 in Griffin. It then proceeds through the western tip of Henry County, passing through Hampton, home of Atlanta Motor Speedway, and continues north through Clayton County and Jonesboro, entering Atlanta.

US 19/US 41 travels through the south side of Atlanta as Metropolitan Parkway (formerly Stewart Avenue) and through Downtown Atlanta as Northside Drive. The concurrencies with US 41 and SR 3 end when US 19 turns east onto 14th Street in Midtown, beginning a concurrency with SR 9. It then turns north on Peachtree Street until it intersects with SR 141 in Buckhead and becomes Roswell Road. US 19 then continues north through Sandy Springs until it reaches I-285's north side. There, the concurrency with SR 9 ends and US 19 is briefly concurrent with I-285, for about 1.5 miles (2.4 km).

US 19 leaves I-285 to travel through the northern suburbs of Atlanta along SR 400. Most of this section is a limited-access road with four lanes in each direction, becoming two lanes in each direction as the highway continues away from the northern suburbs of Atlanta. It picks back up as Lee Highway north of Atlanta. It arrives in Dahlonega, where it is no longer concurrent with SR 400, before about 37 miles (60 km) of extremely curvy road, which includes a concurrency with US 129. The last major town it travels through in Georgia is Blairsville.

=== North Carolina ===
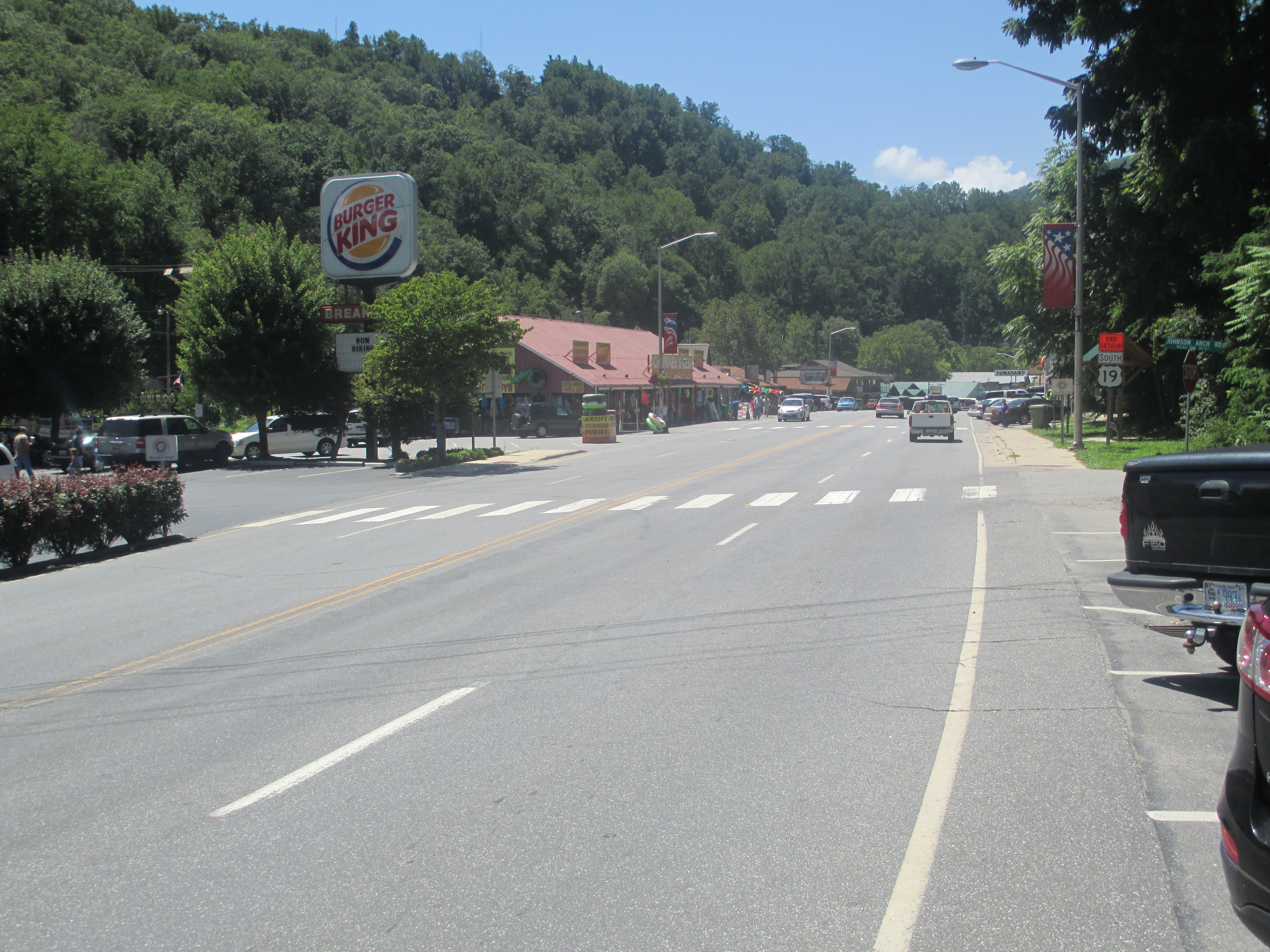
US 19 in Cherokee, North Carolina

US 19 is cosigned with US 129 from the Georgia line to Murphy as Lee Highway, then is cosigned with US 74, as well as US 129 as far as Graham County. US 129 veers away from US 19, heading north to Robbinsville, and continuing to Maryville, Tennessee. US 19 and US 74 are cosigned as far as Ela, after which US 74 veers south, leaving US 19 to head into the Great Smoky Mountains. US 19 passes through the Qualla Boundary. For a brief time, US 19 is cosigned with US 276. Then, US 19 is cosigned with US 23 from Lake Junaluska to Mars Hill (and with US 70 in Asheville), which closely parallels I-40 and then Future I-26.

Just north of Mars Hill, US 19 continues solo to Cane River, where US 19 splits: US 19E toward Burnsville and US 19W toward Erwin, Tennessee.

=== U.S. Route 19E ===
Traversing 75.9 miles (122.1 km) from Cane River, North Carolina, to Bluff City, Tennessee, US 19E first goes east to Burnsville and Spruce Pine, then north along the banks of the North Toe River to Cranberry and Elk Park, before crossing the North Carolina–Tennessee state line. Heading northeast, it goes through Roan Mountain, Hampton, and Elizabethton, rendezvousing with US 19W in Bluff City.

=== U.S. Route 19W ===
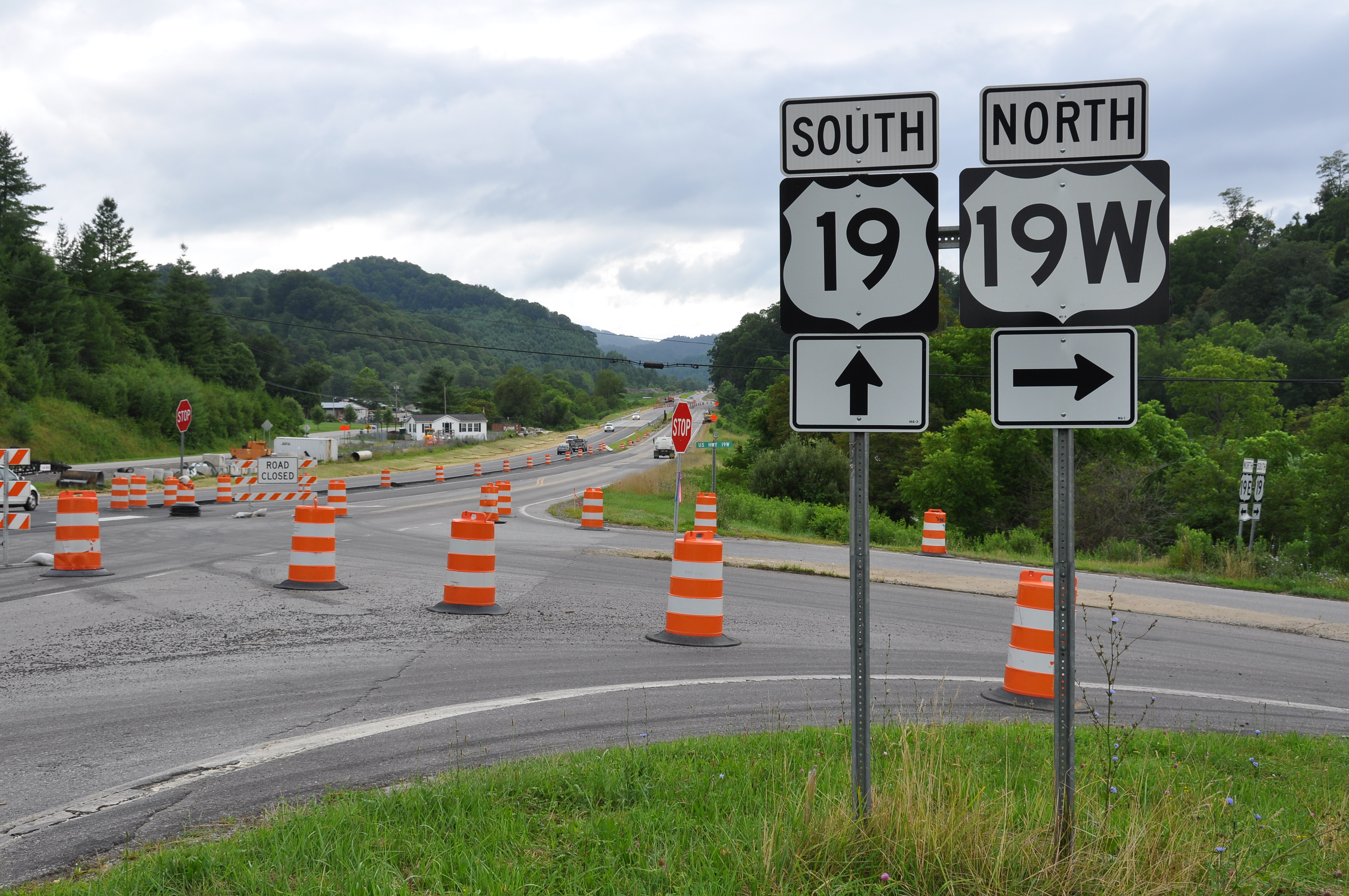
US 19/US 19E/US 19W junction at Cane River, North Carolina

Traversing 62.6 miles (100.7 km) from Cane River, North Carolina, to Bluff City, Tennessee, US 19W goes immediately north along the banks of the Cane River to the communities of Ramseytown and Sioux, then northwest through the Unaka Range, crossing the North Carolina–Tennessee state line. At Ernestville, US 19W joins with I-26/US 23 and proceeds through Erwin, Unicoi, and Johnson City. In Johnson City, it switches partners to US 11E along Bristol Highway, rendezvousing with US 19E in Bluff City.

=== Tennessee ===
US 19 starts again in Bluff City, heading northeast along the Volunteer Parkway (and concurrency with US 11E) to Bristol. In downtown Bristol, US 19 crosses the Tennessee–Virginia state line on State Street.

=== Virginia ===
US 19 goes northeast from Bristol, parallel to I-81, until Abingdon. It then heads north to Lebanon, through Clinch Mountain, then northeast again through the towns of Claypool Hill, Tazewell, and then finally to Bluefield, where it enters West Virginia.

=== West Virginia ===
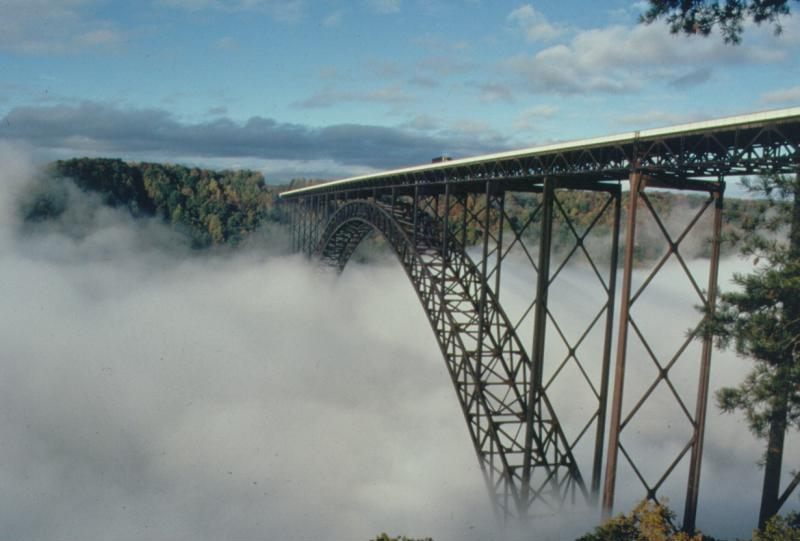
New River Gorge Bridge in West Virginia

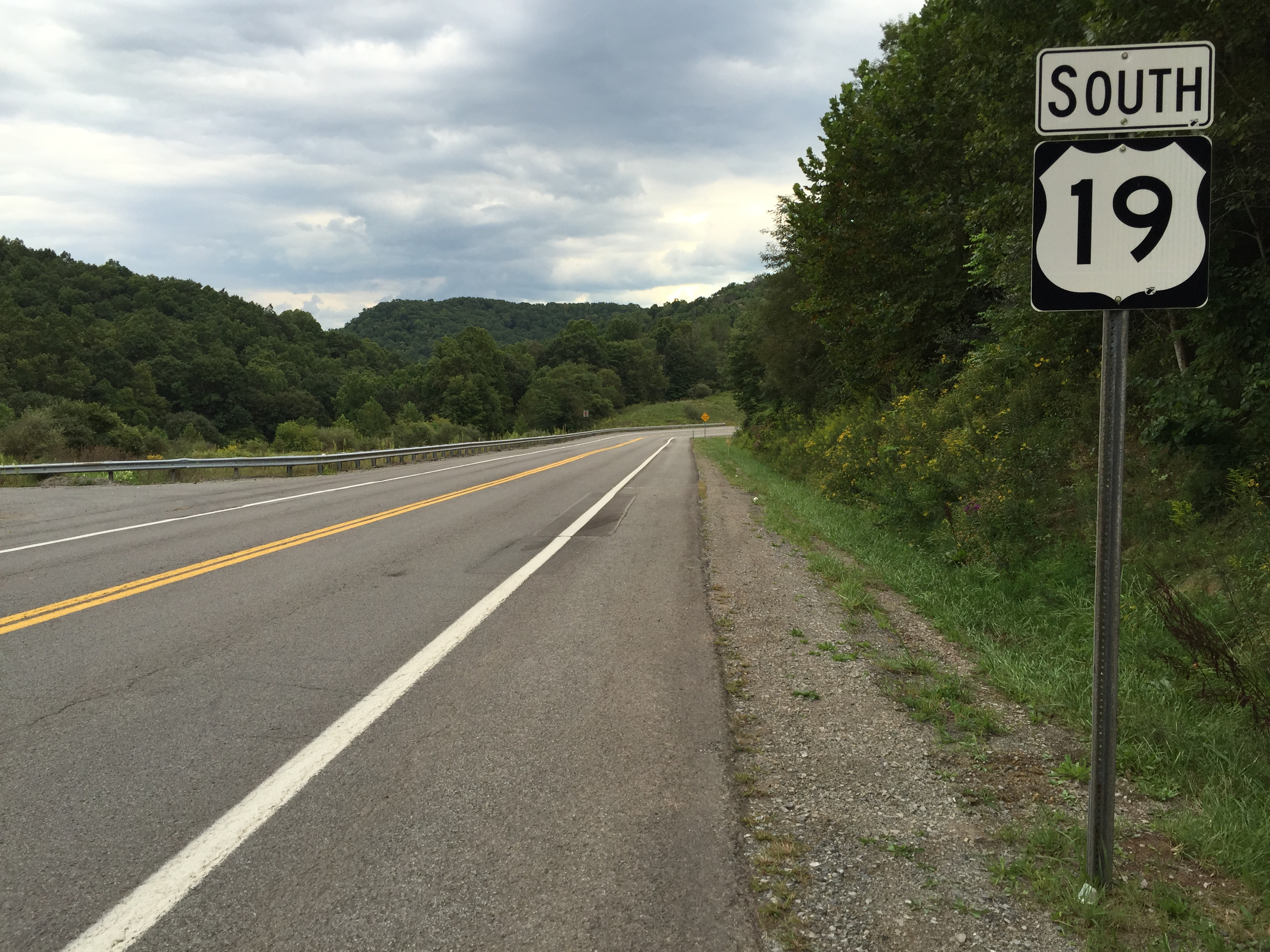
View south along US 19 at I-79 in Lewis County, West Virginia

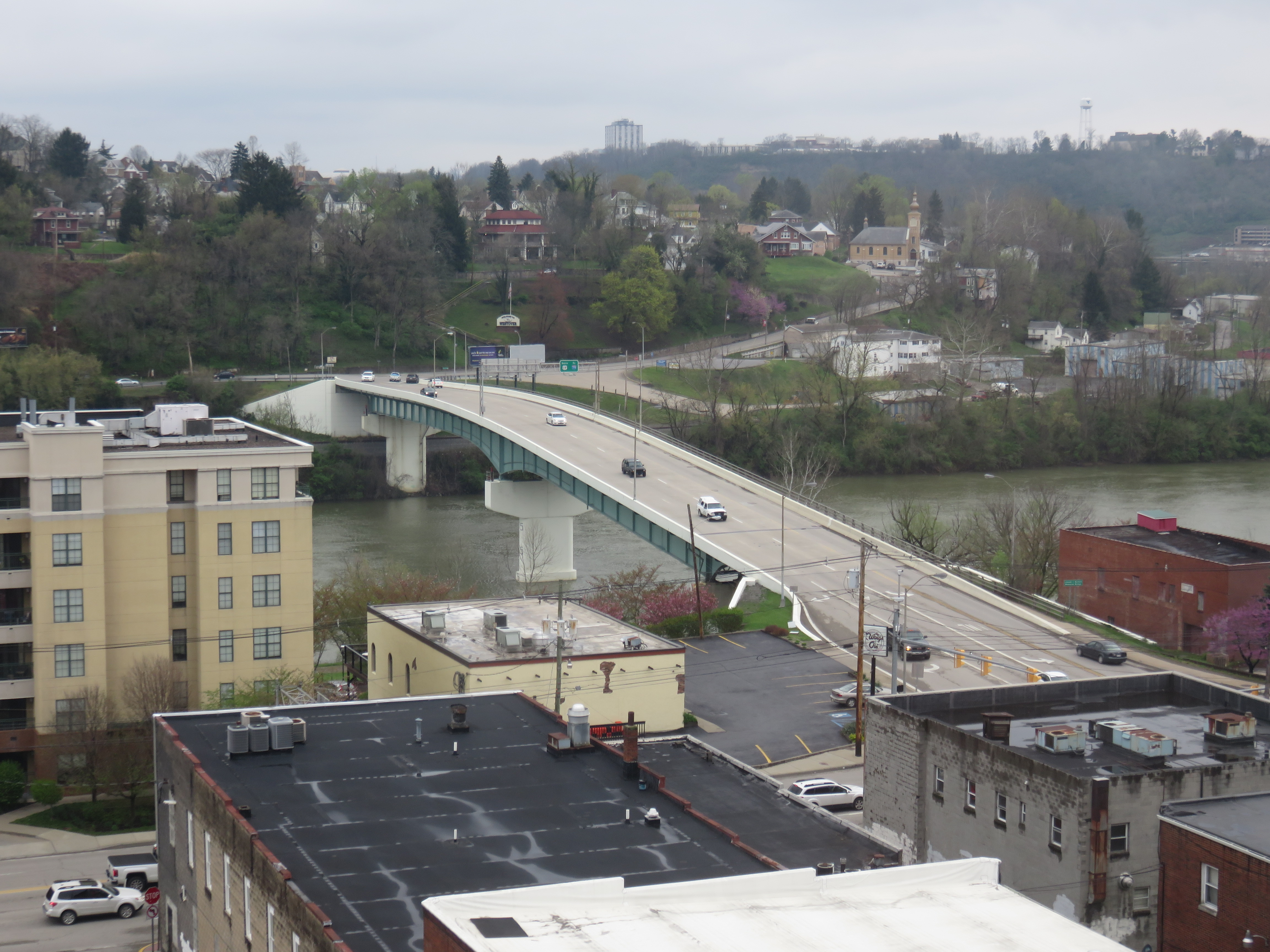
The Westover Bridge carrying US 19 over the Monongahela River in Morgantown, West Virginia

US 19 enters West Virginia as a four-lane highway in Bluefield, where it narrows to two lanes as it winds northward. It later parallels I-77/I-64 until it reaches Beckley, where it goes northeasterly on an expressway-grade four-lane highway. Crossing the New River via the New River Gorge Bridge near Fayetteville, it passes through Summersville and Birch River before arriving at I-79, five miles (8.0 km) south of Sutton. From there, it runs concurrent with I-79 from exit 57 to exit 67 at Flatwoods. Then, it exits and reverts to a two-lane highway, more or less following the route of I-79 as it passes through Weston, Clarksburg, Fairmont, and Morgantown before crossing into Pennsylvania. The distance from Beckley from I-79 is also known as Appalachian Development Highway System (ADHS) Corridor L. It allows traffic to the Pittsburgh, Pennsylvania, area to bypass Charleston, and is thus part of a main link from Charlotte, North Carolina, and Myrtle Beach, South Carolina, to Pittsburgh.

=== Pennsylvania ===
US 19 is closely paralleled by I-79 for its entire length. From the state line, it goes north to Washington and then through Pittsburgh. It crosses the Ohio River via the West End Bridge just west of Downtown Pittsburgh. In Cranberry Township, north of Pittsburgh, US 19 shares a major junction between I-76 (Pennsylvania Turnpike) and I-79, via the Cranberry Connector. US 19 crosses I-80 in the East Lackawannock Township. Near Erie, it crosses I-90 before going through the downtown area, ending at US 20 (26th Street).

=== ADHS corridors ===
US 19 overlaps with three corridors that are part of the ADHS, which is part of Appalachian Regional Commission (ARC). Passed in 1965, the purpose of the ADHS is to generate economic development in previously isolated areas, supplement the Interstate Highway System, connect Appalachia to the Interstate System, and provide access to areas within the region as well as to markets in the rest of the nation.

- Corridor A – From I-285, in Sandy Springs, Georgia, to I-40, near Clyde, North Carolina. US 19/SR 400 overlaps from Sandy Springs to SR 141, near Cumming in Georgia. The entire section is a controlled-access highway.
- Corridor A-1 – From SR 141, near Cumming, Georgia, to SR 53, near Dawsonville, Georgia. The entire 15.8-mile (25.4 km) section of US 19/SR 400 is authorized for ADHS funding. The entire route is a divided four-lane highway, with the southern section a controlled-access highway and the northern section being a limited-access road.
- Corridor K – From I-75, in Cleveland, Tennessee, to US 23, in Dillsboro, North Carolina. US 19 overlaps from US 64/US 74, near Murphy, to US 74 (Great Smoky Mountains Expressway), near Bryson City. The routing is a four-lane limited-access road from near Murphy to Andrews; the rest is two-lane through the Nantahala Gorge. Future plans include building a new four-lane limited-access road from Andrews, through Robbinsville, to Stecoah, bypassing the Nantahala Gorge.
- Corridor L – From I-64/I-77, near Beckley, West Virginia, to I-79, near Sutton, West Virginia. Of the 69.9-mile (112.5 km) section of US 19, only 60.5-mile (97.4 km) was authorized for ADHS funding. This corridor is considered complete, with a divided four-lane limited-access road with interchanges at major intersections.
- Corridor Q – From US 23/US 119, in Shelbiana, Kentucky, to I-81, near Christiansburg, Virginia. US 19 overlaps from US 460, in Claypool Hill, Virginia, to US 460, in Princeton, West Virginia. The entire route is a mostly divided four lane limited-access road with interchanges at major intersections.

== History ==
=== Florida ===
US 19 first entered Florida in 1929. It underwent two route shifts, the first in 1933 and the second in 1946, which adjusted it to its current alignment. US 19 was extended to its southern terminus of Memphis in September 1954, when the original Sunshine Skyway Bridge opened to traffic.

Starting around 1956, US 19 was four-laned, initially in the Perry area, working north toward the Georgia border. The entire route in Florida was four-laned by 1972.

The planned St. Petersburg–Clearwater Expressway, or Pinellas Beltway, would have followed the current alignment of US 19 Alt. from I-275 to Clearwater, Florida. The intersection of Seminole Boulevard and Bay Pines Boulevard is a remnant of this proposed road. The beltway road was proposed in 1974, but it was dead by 1980.

=== North Carolina ===
In North Carolina, US 19 was North Carolina Highway 10 (NC 10) from the Georgia state line to Asheville, NC 29 from Asheville to Madison County, NC 69 to a point near the Tennessee state line, and either NC 194 or NC 694 for a short distance south of the Tennessee state line.

The original US 19 in Yancey, Mitchell, and Avery counties mostly followed the route now designated US 19E. US 19W in Yancey County was US 19-23 in 1935, and what is now US 19E was US 19A. The US 19E and US 19W designations have been used since 1930.

Prior to 1948, US 19 between Ela and Waynesville essentially followed the route of present-day US 74. Then, this road was called US 19A and the section of NC 28. From Ela to Cherokee and the section of NC 293 from Cherokee to near Waynesville became US 19. Improvements were made, including a new section of highway west of Lake Junaluska.

Around 1956, US 19/US 23 was widened to four lanes from Lake Junaluska to Canton.

By 1970, a section of US 19 west of Murphy, also designated US 64 (and later US 74), was widened to four lanes.

In January 1983, after improvements to US 19A had made it similar to an Interstate Highway, the state proposed designating US 19A as US 19 Bypass. At one point, changing US 19A to US 19 was considered, but businesses in Maggie Valley opposed the idea of their highway being changed to US 19A. US 19A became the Great Smoky Mountains Expressway.

=== Tennessee ===
US 19 originally went from the North Carolina state line to US 511. In 1928, US 19 was extended with US 511 to Bristol and into Virginia. In 1930, US 19 south was truncated to Bluff City (the current State Route 44 [SR 44]/SR 390 junction), as US 19E was assigned to US 19 south to North Carolina.

This is still US 19E except Old Highway 19E/Buck Creek Road east of Shell Creek; Carter Street, Main Street, Conway Street, and Cloud Land Drive in Roan Mountain; Crabtree and Old Rock Quarry roads west of Roan Mountain; Little Mountain Church Road; Holtsclaw Road; Herman Johnson Loop; J D Whitehead Road; Old Highway 19E, Schoolhouse Road, and Dave Simerly Road in Tiger Valley; Rittertown Road south of Hampton; Church and 1st streets through Hampton; and Mill Pond Road in the Valley Forge area.

The quite winding alignment where it crosses the Doe River twice is completely abandoned; State Line Road/Johnson Avenue/Sycamore Street/Broad Street through Elizabethton, plus today's SR 400 and Bristol/Elizabethton/Old Elizabethton highways to Bluff City.

In 1931 or 1932, US 19 south was extended over US 19W to the new US 19E/US 19W split in Hillcrest (the current SR 44/Elizabethton Highway junction)

=== Virginia ===
Although an original U.S. Highway, US 19 does not appear on the 1926 official road atlas (which shows other U.S. Highways) nor the 1927 Clason road atlas. It does appear on a mid-1927 official map. It ran generally as it does today. In this routing, US 19 was added to US 11 and State Route 10 (SR 10) from the Tennessee state line to Abingdon, SR 106 from Abingdon to Hansonville, SR 112 from Hansonville to Lebanon, and SR 11 from Lebanon to the West Virginia state line.

Initially, US 19 entered Virginia via Pennsylvania Avenue in Bristol, Tennessee, then used State Street west to Front Street north to Spencer Street northeast to Mary Street east to Goodson Street north to Danville Avenue east to Fairview Street north to Massachusetts Avenue east to Texas Avenue north, which became Old Abingdon Highway ran back into US 11/US 19 near the I-81 interchange.

US 19 followed today's US 11 approaching Abingdon, then used Colonial Avenue and crossed the railroad to modern US 11 at roughly the Bytt Street location, then US 58 Alt. northwest. US 19 followed today's US 19/US 58 Alt. to Hansonville except SR 766 near Abingdon, SR 633 loop at Butts, SR 775 at Greendale, and SR 876/SR 802 at Holton.

Leaving Hansonville, US 19 used today's US 19 up to SR 674, then abandoned alignment on the north side to Sunset Drive, US 19, SR 841 (except initially used SR 758 loop) to US 19 Business (US 19 Bus.), some of US 19 Bus., Gilbert Street/Old Fincastle Road, SR 82, and US 19 Bus. through Lebanon.

East of Lebanon, US 19 used SR 656 loop back to US 19. After a brief stretch of today's US 19, US 19 followed the SR 872 loop near SR 80 eastbound. US 19 followed more of today's US 19 but near SR 80 westbound stayed north of the creek on Old Rosedale Highway and some abandoned alignments until around SR 644. East of here, US 19 more closely followed it current path although in the field it appears old alignment pieces are visible to the north side.

Before SR 369, US 19 originally used SR 770 to cross into Tazewell County, then SR 609 north back to US 19. US 19 followed its current path to Claypool Hill except it used the SR 705 loop. At Pounding Mill, US 19 used SR 637 but otherwise followed US 19/US 460 and then US 19 Bus./US 460 Bus. to SR 16 Alt.

Initially, US 19 followed Old Fincastle Turnpike in western Tazewell, then current US 19 Bus. through Tazewell, then Ben Bolt Road east to SR 61. US 19 then followed SR 61 north to SR 678 (Market Street). US 19 followed SR 678 north to SR 645 east which used to connect back to modern US 19/US 460.

US 19 followed today's US 19 to Bluefield, West Virginia, except SR 781, SR 680 loops in Springville, SR 665, and SR 744/SR 1520 Shannandale. There are other visible unnumbered loops that are visible to the north side of US 19/US 460. In Bluefield, US 19 used Greever and East streets.

=== West Virginia ===
Appeared in December 1926 as an original U.S. Highway, replacing West Virginia Route 4 (WV 4) from Bluefield to Westover and WV 30 from Westover to Pennsylvania.

The original description of US 19 in the 1925 West Virginia Department of Transportation (WVDOT) annual report had US 19 ending at US 60 in Gauley Bridge and the 1926 official maps of both Virginia and West Virginia show this, but, by the time the U.S. Numbered Highway System went live in late 1926, US 19 did extend all the way through West Virginia.

The road from Beckwith to US 60 was completed as new construction in 1926. It is unclear if US 19 was briefly part of the old route via Kanawha Falls which became part of WV 61 (now County Route 13, or CR 13).

In 1929, US 19 was rerouted at Belva to the current WV 39 crossing of Twentymile Creek. The old route used today's CR 16/6 which no longer crosses the railroad and abandoned routing northwest to the Creek crossing which remained many decades past but is now gone along WV 16 north of the WV 39 junction.

In about 1931, according to that year's WVDOT annual report, US 19/US 21 was removed from CR 19/19 (Cherry Creek Circle) and CR 119/8 (Lamar Circle) in Cherry Creek; CR 19/17 (Marshall Circle) all between Ghent and Shady Spring; also CR 19/28 (Ransom Drive), CR 119/20 (Little Vine Drive), and CR 19/14. Old US 19 loops above Shady Spring.

Also, in about 1931, according to that year's WVDOT annual report, US 19/US 21 was rebuilt from Skelton to Mount Hope and removed from CR 19/5 and CR 4 (Prosperity Road) through Prosperity; CR 16/68 (Bradley School Road); and CR 19/1 (Maple Lane; no longer connects to), CR 1/25, CR 19/43 (Sherwood Road), and CR 21/8 (Sherwood Heights Road).

In about 1934, US 19 was given a new routing between Bluefield and Princeton. The old route became CR 25 (Old Princeton Road) out of Bluefield; CR 25 (Mercer Mall Road) to Edison (some of this is now WV 123); WV 71 legs (now CR 19/33 [Maple Acres Road] to Glenwood; Glenwood/Green Valley/Old Bluefield roads [CR 19/29] from Glenwood to Princeton).

Also, in about 1934, according to that year's WVDOT annual report, the original Beckley Bypass was completed. It is referred to as "Alternate Route" through at least 1936. Then, by 1940, it appears mainline US 19 was moved onto it, leaving behind US 19 Alt. (now WV 16, CR 21/5, more WV 16, and all of WV 210) through Beckley.

Also, in about 1934, according to that year's WVDOT annual report, US 19/US 21 was put on mostly new construction from Oak Hill to Fayetteville, leaving behind CR 19/2 (Broadway Avenue) and CR 19/1 (Nickelville Road).

In about 1935, according to that year's WVDOT annual report, US 19/US 21 was removed from Covington and Piney Creek roads near Raleigh (south edge of Beckley)

Also, in about 1935, according to that year's WVDOT annual report, US 19/US 21 was put on new construction between Glen Jean and Oak Hill leaving behind CR 20 (now CR 21/20) from Glen Jean to Whipple Junction and CR 15 from Whipple Junction to Oak Hill.

Also, in about 1935, according to that year's WVDOT annual report, US 19/US 21 was removed from CR 21/4 (Old Court Street) north of Fayetteville.

Also, in about 1935, according to that year's WVDOT annual report, US 19 was removed from Colasessano Drive which no longer crosses Buffalo Creek to Old Pennsylvania Avenue north of Fairmont.

In about 1936, according to that year's WVDOT annual report, US 19/US 21 was removed from today's CR 119/6 (Sheloh Circle) and CR 119/2 (Madoc Circle) in Cool Ridge.

In 1936 or 1937, US 19 was removed from CR 19/9 and CR 19/10 (Robinson Run Road) in Bowlby.

Between 1947 and 1949, US 19 was rerouted to run directly from Beckley to Summersville as an addition to WV 41. The old route through Fayetteville to Gauley Bridge remained part of US 21 (now WV 16 except US 19 used WV 211 through Mount Hope) while Gauley River to Summersville became an extended WV 39.

=== Pennsylvania ===
For many years, the Venango Path was a Native American trail between the Forks of the Ohio (present day Pittsburgh) and Presque Isle Bay. This trail follows modern US 19 from Pittsburgh across the Allegheny River to Perrysville. It continues to Wexford and crosses Brush Creek at Warrendale. Here, the path and modern road separate for a time. The path goes across fields while the road parallels it—from a distance of 0.75 miles (1.21 km) to the west—for about 3.5 miles (5.6 km) to Ogle.

US 19 in Pennsylvania has maintained a similar alignment for much of its history. In 1928, US 19 was moved to its current route between Pittsburgh and Meadville. The West End Bridge in Pittsburgh was completed in 1932, and US 19 was realigned to cross the bridge. In 1936, US 19 was moved to its current alignment between Zelienople and Harmony. Through the 1940s and 1950s, different parts of US 19 were widened.

In 1987, the Phase One project started to connect two sections of Ohio River Boulevard near Western Avenue and Chateau Street. Phase Two of the project included a new interchange between the Pennsylvania Route 65 (PA 65) expressway (concurrent with US 19 west of the interchange) and the West End Bridge. The bridge was closed for two years for construction but reopened in 1991 while construction finished in 1992.

In 2003, the Pennsylvania Department of Transportation (PennDOT) started a project to build a US 19 tunnel under the Norfolk Southern Railway, as well as align the West End Bypass with the West End Circle, the intersection of US 19, PA 51, PA 60, and PA 837. The project was completed in 2010.

In 2016, a diverging diamond interchange was built at the intersection of US 19 and I-70/I-79 in South Strabane Township.

PennDOT has started construction on a multilane roundabout at the intersection of US 6, US 19, US 322, and PA 98 in Vernon Township, near Meadville. Construction was expected to be completed in October 2019.

PennDOT has also started construction on an intersection improvement project at the northern intersection of US 19 and PA 97. PA 97 were realigned to meet US 19 at a 90-degree angle, and new left-turn lanes and traffic signals were installed. Construction was expected to be completed in October 2019.

== Major intersections ==
Southern segment

Florida
US 41 in Memphis
I-275 in Terra Ceia. The highways travel concurrently to St. Petersburg.
US 98 in Sugarmill Woods. The highways travel concurrently to Perry.
US 129 in Chiefland
US 221 in Perry
US 27 West Of Perry
I-10 north-northeast of Capps
US 90 in Monticello
Georgia
US 84 east of Thomasville. The highways travel concurrently to northeast of Thomasville.
US 319 In Thomasville
US 82 in Albany. The highways travel concurrently through the city.
US 280 southwest of Americus. The highways travel concurrently to Americus.
US 80 southwest of Salem. The highways travel concurrently for approximately 2.1 miles (3.4 km).
US 41 south of Griffin. The highways travel concurrently to Atlanta.
I-75 west of Morrow
I-285 in Forest Park
I-75 on the Atlanta–Hapeville city line
I-85 in Atlanta
US 29 in Atlanta. The highways travel concurrently through the city.
US 29 / US 78 / US 278 in Atlanta. US 19/US 78/US 278 travel concurrently through the city.
I-285 in Sandy Springs. The highways travel concurrently through the city.
US 129 in Turners Corner. The highways travel concurrently to Topton, North Carolina.
US 76 in Blairsville.
North Carolina
US 64 / US 74 in Ranger. US 19/US 64 travel concurrently to Murphy. US 19/US 74 travel concurrently to southwest of Bryson City.
US 441 in Cherokee. The highways travel concurrently through the city.
US 276 in Dellwood. The highways travel concurrently to Lake Junaluska.
US 23 / US 74 in Lake Junaluska. US 19/US 23 travel concurrently to northeast of Mars Hill. US 19/US 74 travel concurrently to west of Clyde.
I-40 / US 74 in Asheville
Future I-26 / I-240 in Asheville. I-26/US 19 travel concurrently to northeast of Mars Hill. I-240/US 19 travel concurrently through the city.
I-240 / US 70 in Asheville. US 19/US 70 travel concurrently to Weaverville.
US 25 in Woodfin. The highways travel concurrently to Weaverville.
US 19E / US 19W in Cane River

Northern segment

Tennessee
US 11E / US 19E / US 19W in Bluff City. US 11E/US 19 travel concurrently to Bristol, Virginia.
US 421 in Bristol. The highways travel concurrently to Bristol, Virginia.
Virginia
US 11 in Bristol. The highways travel concurrently to Abingdon.
I-81 / US 58 in Bristol
US 460 in Claypool Hill. The highways travel concurrently to Bluefield.
West Virginia
US 52 in Bluefield. The highways travel concurrently through the city.
US 460 northeast of Bluefield. The highways travel concurrently to southwest of Princeton.
I-77 south-southeast of Camp Creek
US 60 in Hico
I-79 south-southwest of Sutton. The highways travel concurrently to south-southwest of Flatwoods.
I-79 northwest of Walkersville
US 33 / US 119 in Weston. The highways travel concurrently through the city.
US 50 in Clarksburg
US 250 in Fairmont. The highways travel concurrently through the city.
I-79 southwest of Westover
US 119 in Morgantown
Pennsylvania
I-79 in Washington Township
I-79 in South Strabane Township
US 40 in South Strabane Township. The highways travel concurrently to Washington.
I-70 / I-79 in South Strabane Township
I-376 / US 22 / US 30 in Pittsburgh.
I-79 in Marshall Township
I-76 in Cranberry Township
I-79 south of Zelienople
US 422 in Muddy Creek Township
I-80 in Findley Township
US 62 in Mercer. The highways travel concurrently to north of Mercer.
US 6 / US 322 in Vernon Township. US 6/US 19 travel concurrently to LeBoeuf Township. US 19/US 322 travel concurrently to Meadville.
I-79 in Vernon Township
US 6 / US 6N in LeBoeuf Township
I-90 in Summit Township
US 20 in Erie

== See also ==
- Special routes of U.S. Route 19
- U.S. Route 119
- U.S. Route 219
- U.S. Route 319
