= Tennessee State Route 361 =

State highway in Tennessee, United States

State Route 361
- TN 361 highlighted in red

Route information
- Maintained by TDOT
- Length: 8.8 mi (14.2 km)
- Existed: July 1, 1983–present

Major junctions
- West end: SR 359 in Pine Crest
- SR 362 south of Elizabethton
- East end: US 19E in Hampton

Location
- Country: United States
- State: Tennessee
- Counties: Carter

Highway system
- Tennessee State Routes; Interstate; US; State
← SR 360	→ SR 362

State Route 361 (SR 361) is an 8.8-mile-long (14.2 km) east–west state highway in Carter County, Tennessee. It serves as a connector between Pine Crest and Hampton, as well as provides access to the Laurels Recreation Area section of the Cherokee National Forest.

Portions of the highway are known as Laurels Road, Dry Creek Road, and Gap Creek Road.

== Route description ==
SR 361 begins as Laurels Road in southern Pine Crest at an intersection with SR 359. It heads southeast through farmland and rural areas before passing through mountains, a narrow section of the Cherokee National Forest, and by the Laurels Recreation Area. The highway then becomes Dry Creek Road and goes east along a narrow valley to have an intersection with SR 362. SR 361 then becomes Gap Creek Road and continues east through rural areas to enter Hampton and crosses a bridge over the Little Doe River. The highway then comes to an end at an intersection with US 19E/SR 37 south of downtown. The entire route of SR 361 is a two-lane highway.

== Major intersections ==
The entire route is in Carter County.

Location	mi	km	Destinations	Notes
Pine Crest	0.0	0.0	SR 359 (Okolona Road) to I-26 – Milligan College	Western terminus
			SR 362 north (Gap Creek Road) – Elizabethton	Southern terminus of SR 362
Hampton			Warner Dunlap Bridge over the Little Doe River	
Hampton	8.8	14.2	US 19E (SR 37) – Roan Mountain, Downtown, Elizabethton	Eastern terminus
1.000 mi = 1.609 km; 1.000 km = 0.621 mi
