= Tennessee State Route 359 =

State highway in Tennessee, United States

State Route 359
- TN 359 highlighted in red

Route information
- Maintained by TDOT
- Length: 4.9 mi (7.9 km)
- Existed: July 1, 1983–present

Major junctions
- South end: I-26 / US 19W / US 23 in Johnson City
- North end: US 321 / SR 67 in Elizabethton

Location
- Country: United States
- State: Tennessee
- Counties: Carter

Highway system
- Tennessee State Routes; Interstate; US; State
← SR 358	→ SR 360

State Route 359 (SR 359) is a 4.9-mile-long (7.9 km) north-south state highway located entirely in Carter County, Tennessee.

== Route description ==
SR 359 begins at an interchange with I-26/US 19W/US 23 exit 27. From this interchange, SR 359 travels eastward to South Roan Street; it then turns north onto, and merges with, South Roan Street for 0.2 miles (0.32 km) to an intersection where South Roan Street continues north and SR 359 turns northeast and continues a north-northeast track to Milligan Highway. SR 359 turns east on to Milligan Highway and continues a northeasterly track until it ends at an intersection with US 321/SR 67.

== History ==
Prior to the 1983 renumbering, SR 359 was designated SR 67A.

== Major intersections ==
The entire route is in Carter County.

Location	mi	km	Destinations	Notes
Johnson City	0.0	0.0	I-26 / US 19W / US 23 – Johnson City, Kingsport, Asheville	I-26/US 19W/US 23 exit 27; southern terminus
Johnson City	0.2	0.32	South Roan Street – Unicoi	
Johnson City	0.4	0.64	South Roan Street – Johnson City	
Pine Crest	1.8	2.9	SR 361 east (Laurels Road)	Western terminus of SR 361
Elizabethton	2.6	4.2	Milligan Highway – Johnson City	
Elizabethton	4.9	7.9	US 321 / SR 67 (West Elk Avenue) – Johnson City, Elizabethton	Northern terminus
1.000 mi = 1.609 km; 1.000 km = 0.621 mi
