= Tennessee State Route 362 =

State highway in Tennessee, United States

State Route 362
- Mary Patton Highway; Gap Creek Road
- TN 362 highlighted in red

Route information
- Maintained by TDOT
- Length: 5.7 mi (9.2 km)
- Existed: July 1, 1983–present

Major junctions
- South end: SR 361 south of Elizabethton
- North end: US 321 / SR 67 / SR 91 in Elizabethton

Location
- Country: United States
- State: Tennessee
- Counties: Carter

Highway system
- Tennessee State Routes; Interstate; US; State
← SR 361	→ SR 363

State Route 362 (SR 362), also known as Mary Patton Highway and Gap Creek Road, is a 5.7-mile-long (9.2 km) north-south state highway in Carter County, Tennessee.

== Route description ==
SR 362 begins in a narrow valley at an intersection with SR 361 just east of the Laurels Recreation Area of the Cherokee National Forest. It goes north as Gap Creek Road to pass between two mountains, and a section of the Cherokee National Forest, to an intersection with Mary Patton Highway, where it splits off of Gap Creek Road and merges with Mary Patton Highway. The highway continues north through a mix of farmland and hilly terrain. The highway then meets back up with Gap Creek Road as it enters Elizabethton and has an intersection with W G Street. SR 362 then comes to an end at an intersection with US 321/SR 67/SR 91 (W Elk Avenue), just west of downtown along the banks of the Watauga River. Except within Elizabethton near its north end, the entire route of SR 362 is two-lane highway.

== Major intersections ==
The entire route is in Carter County.

Location	mi	km	Destinations	Notes
	0.0	0.0	SR 361 (Dry Creek Road/Gap Creek Road) – Pine Crest, Hampton	Southern terminus; provides access to Laurels Recreation Area of the Cherokee National Forest
Elizabethton	5.7	9.2	US 321 / SR 67 / SR 91 (W Elk Avenue) – Johnson City, Central, Hunter, Hampton	Northern terminus
1.000 mi = 1.609 km; 1.000 km = 0.621 mi
