= Tennessee State Route 91 =

State highway in Tennessee, United States

State Route 91
- SR 91 highlighted in red

Route information
- Maintained by TDOT
- Length: 53.5 mi (86.1 km)

Major junctions
- South end: US 11E in Johnson City
- I-26 / US 19W / US 23 in Johnson City; US 321 / SR 67 / SR 362 in Elizabethton; US 19E / US 321 / SR 67 in Elizabethton; US 421 / SR 133 in Shady Valley
- North end: SR 91 at the Virginia state line near Damascus, VA

Location
- Country: United States
- State: Tennessee
- Counties: Washington, Carter, Johnson

Highway system
- Tennessee State Routes; Interstate; US; State
← SR 90	→ SR 92

State Route 91 (SR 91) is a state highway in the northeastern portion of the U.S. state of Tennessee, in the area known as the Tri-Cities region. The route connects Johnson City with Damascus, Virginia via Elizabethton, Hunter, and Mountain City.

== Route description ==
SR 91 begins at an intersection with US 11E/SR 34 in Johnson City. The first section of the road follows two one-way streets, namely Market Street (westbound traffic) and Main Street (eastbound traffic). It has an interchange with I-26/US 19W/US 23 before continuing along East Main Street and Elizabethton Highway as it leaves the city.

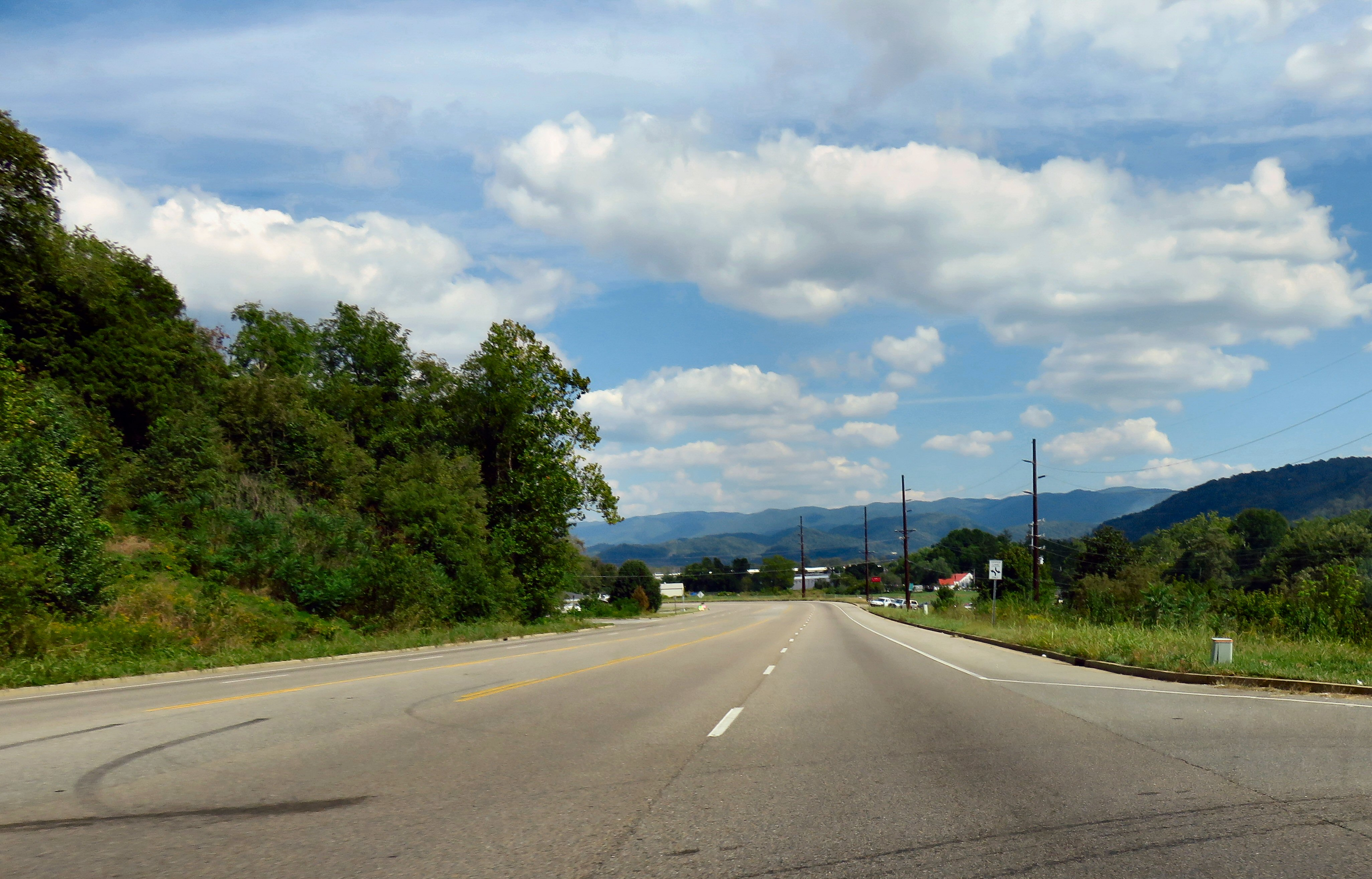
SR 91 near Hunter

In Elizabethton, it meets US 321/SR 67/SR 362, and runs concurrent with US 321 along West Elk Avenue and Broad Street through the city's downtown area. Along the way, it passes Sycamore Shoals State Historic Area. Farther into the city, the highway crosses the Doe River before reaching its US 19E/US 321/SR 67/SR 37 intersection. It then turns northward to run concurrent with these highways, crossing the Watauga River via the Gilbert Peters Bridge before splitting off again and continuing northeastward along Stony Creek Road.

In northeastern Elizabethton, SR 91 passes Elizabethton Municipal Airport and the Elizabethton campus of Northeast State Community College. Beyond the community of Hunter, the highway enters the Cherokee National Forest as it continues northeastward through a broad valley between Holston Mountain to the north and the Iron Mountains to the south. Northeast of the Buladeen area, the highway ascends to over 3,500 feet (1,100 m) through a series of switchback curves as it passes over a cross ridge between Holston Mountain and the Irons, where it enters Johnson County. It then descends into the secluded Shady Valley.

In Shady Valley, the route intersects US 421/SR 34/SR 133. US 421 continues northwestward to Bristol, while SR 133 continues northeastward toward Damascus, Virginia. SR 91 turns southeastward to run concurrent with US 421 and SR 34. The highway crosses the Iron Mountains at Sandy Gap, climbing to over 3,800 feet (1,200 m) before descending again to the outskirts of Mountain City.

Near downtown Mountain City, SR 91 splits off from US 421/SR 34 to once again follow a northeastward track. It continues through a series of gradual ascents and descents across rugged terrain before reaching Laurel Bloomery in the northeastern part of the county. SR 91 meets its northern terminus at the Virginia state line, near Damascus, where the roadway continues as Virginia State Route 91 into Washington County, Virginia, and the Jefferson National Forest.

== Major intersections ==
County	Location	mi	km	Destinations	Notes
Washington	Johnson City	0.00	0.00	US 11E (West Market Street / John Exum Parkway / SR 34)	Southern terminus
Washington	Johnson City			SR 400 north (West Watauga Avenue)	Southern terminus of SR 400
Washington	Johnson City			I-26 / US 23 (US 19W) – Kingsport, TRI Airport, Erwin	I-26 exit 23
Carter	Elizabethton			US 321 south / SR 67 west (Elk Avenue) – Johnson City	Southern end of US 321/SR 67 unsigned 0concurrency
Carter	Elizabethton			SR 362 south (Mary Patton Highway)	Northern terminus of SR 362
Carter	Elizabethton			SR 400 south (North Lynn Avenue)	Northern terminus of SR 400
Carter	Elizabethton			US 19E south / US 321 south / SR 67 east (Veterans Memorial Parkway / SR 37) – Hampton, Roan Mountain, Mountain City, Boone, NC, Roan Mountain State Park, Watauga Lake	Northern end of US 321/SR 67 concurrency, Southern end of US 19E/SR 37 concurrency
Carter				US 19E north (SR 37) / Lovers Lane – Bluff City	Northern end of US 19E/SR 37 concurrency; interchange
Johnson	Shady Valley			US 421 north (SR 34) / SR 133 north – Damascus, Bristol	southern end of US 421/SR 34 concurrency; Southern terminus of SR 133
Johnson	Mountain City			US 421 south (SR 34) – Mountain City	Southern end of concurrency
Johnson		53.5	86.1	SR 91 north (Mountain City Road) – Damascus, Abingdon, Saltville	Virginia state line
1.000 mi = 1.609 km; 1.000 km = 0.621 mi: Concurrency terminus

== See also ==
- List of state routes in Tennessee
