= Ramseytown, North Carolina =

- Unincorporated community
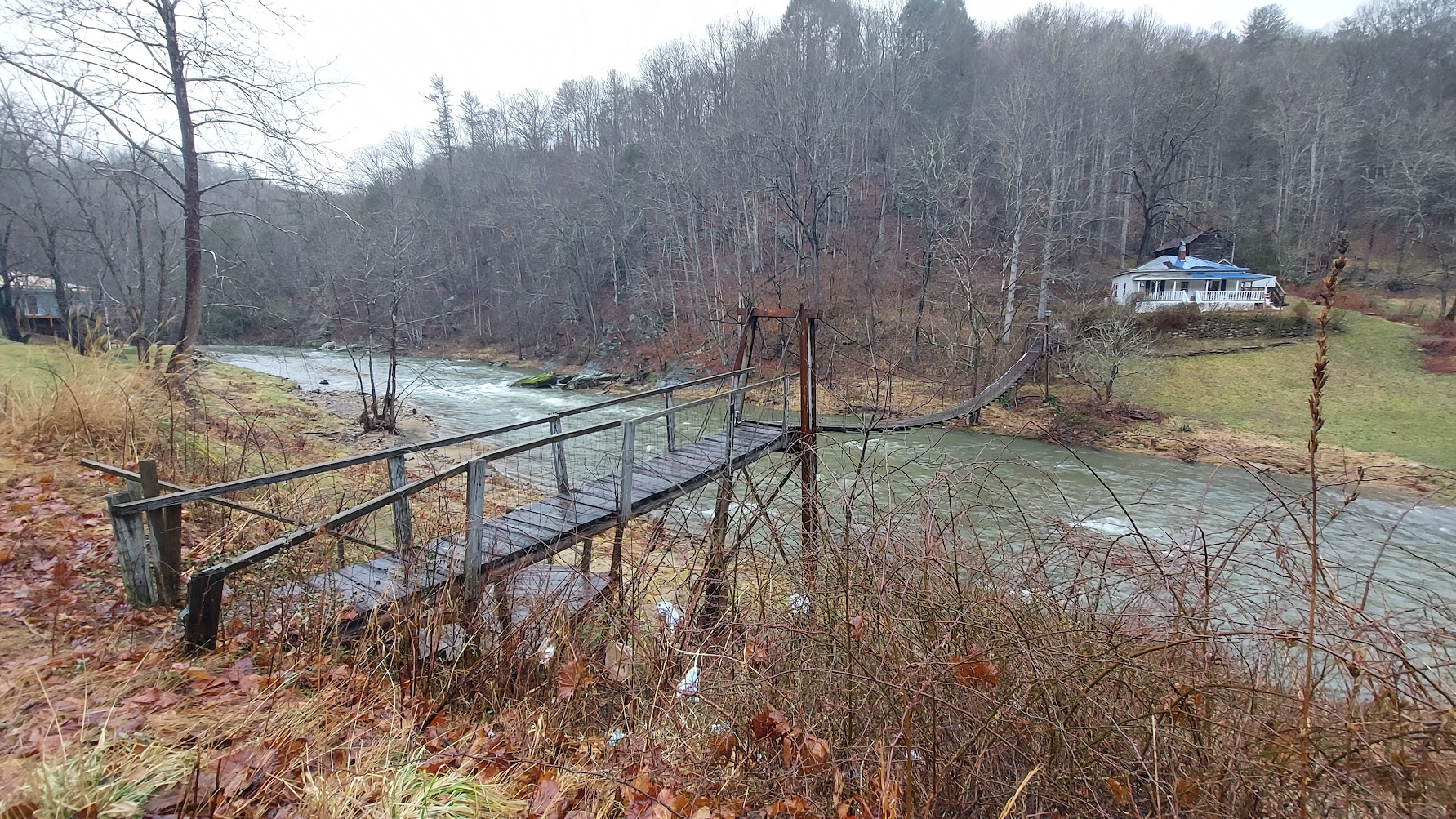
- A suspension bridge over the Cane River, Ramseytown

- Location within the state of North Carolina
- Coordinates: 36°0′2.40″N 82°21′26.48″W
- Country: United States
- State: North Carolina
- County: Yancey
- Incorporated: February 11, 1874 as Ramsey Town Baptist Church
- Disincorporated: Unknown

Area
  - Total: 0.79 sq mi (2.0 km^{2})
  - Land: 0.715 sq mi (1.85 km^{2})
  - Water: 0.075 sq mi (0.19 km^{2})
- Elevation: 3,268 ft (996 m)
- Highest elevation (Julius Knob): 3,822 ft (1,165 m)
- Lowest elevation (Cane River): 2,099 ft (640 m)

Population
  - Estimate (2020): ~45
- Time zone: UTC-5 (Eastern (EST))
  - Summer (DST): UTC-4 (EDT)
- ZIP code: 28714
- Area code: 828
- GNIS feature ID: 1022144

Ramseytown, formerly known as Ramsaytown and Ramsey Town Baptist Church, is an unincorporated community in far northern Yancey County, North Carolina, on the Cane River.

Yancey County's larger Ramseytown Township derives its name from the settlement, and also includes the communities of Bent Creek, Sioux, and White Oak Flats. A portion of the Appalachian Trail runs through the northern part of the township, along the border with Unicoi County, Tennessee.

== History ==
A U.S. Post Office bearing the name of Ramsaytown was established on November 5, 1852, with the first postmaster being Abraham Whitsen. It ceased operations on February 29, 1956. The community was incorporated by the North Carolina General Assembly on February 11, 1874 as Ramsey Town Baptist Church, and the municipal limits were defined as a circle of one mile in radius, centered on the local baptist church. It was disincorporated on an unknown date. Alcoholic beverages consisting of 21% alcohol by volume or greater were illegal in the town, and the municipality's council was composed of five members.

During World War I, five men from Ramseytown were drafted.

The official name of the town, as recognized by the federal government, was changed from Ramsaytown to Ramseytown on January 1, 1931.

On April 21, 1948, local railroad engineer Clarence Davenport (July 24, 1894–April 21, 1948) was killed in a boiler explosion near Ramseytown, described as one of the worst locomotive explosions in United States history at the time. The locomotive's fireman also perished in the blast.

The community was home to the Ramsey Mine.

== Transportation and infrastructure ==
U.S. Route 19W runs through the community. The community was formerly served by the Clinchfield Railroad.

Ramseytown shares a fire department, the Egypt-Ramseytown Volunteer Fire Department, with the nearby unincorporated community of Egypt, North Carolina. The department receives $21,037.50 in funding from the State of North Carolina as of 2023.

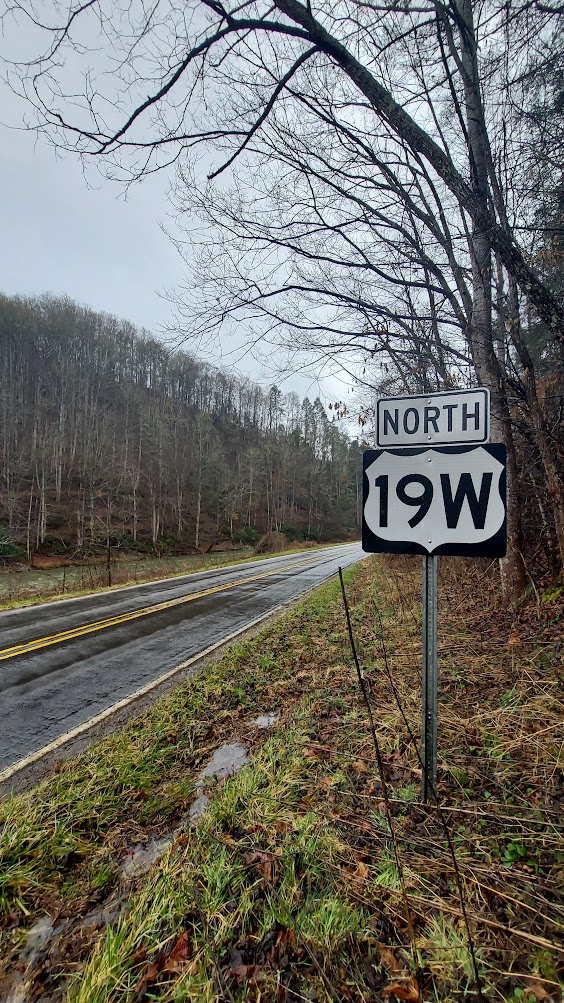
U.S. Route 19W in Ramseytown

== Meteorological history ==
Ramseytown was the site of an EF1 tornado during the Tornado outbreak sequence of August 4–8, 2023. Tornadoes are exceptionally rare in the area.

In Fall 2024, Ramseytown was devastated by Hurricane Helene. The community was only accessible by helicopter due to the destruction of large segments of U.S. Route 19W. As described by National Guard Chief Warrant Officer 3 Jonathan Behuniak, “There [was] really no access from the outside world.” Yancey County was one of the hardest-hit areas in the storm, which caused severe damage across Western North Carolina.
