= U.S. Route 23 in Tennessee =

United States Numbered Highway in Tennessee

U.S. Route 23
- James H. Quillen Parkway
- I-26/US 23 concurrency in purple and US 23/SR 137 concurrency in red

Route information
- Maintained by TDOT
- Length: 57.48 mi (92.51 km) The length of I-26 is 54.45 miles (87.63 km).
- Existed: May 26, 1930–present
- History: Present-day route completed July 5, 1995; I-26 established August 5, 2003
- Component highways: US 23 from the North Carolina state line to the Virginia state line; I-26 from the North Carolina state line to Kingsport; US 19W from Temple Hill to Johnson City; SR 137 from Kingsport to the Virginia state line

Major junctions
- South end: I-26 / US 23 at the North Carolina state line near Flag Pond
- US 19W in Temple Hill; US 321 / SR 67 in Johnson City; US 11E / US 19W in Johnson City; SR 381 in Johnson City; I-81 in Kingsport; SR 93 in Kingsport; US 11W in Kingsport
- North end: US 23 at the Virginia state line in Morrison City

Location
- Country: United States
- State: Tennessee
- Counties: Unicoi, Carter, Washington, Sullivan

Highway system
- United States Numbered Highway System; List; Special; Divided; Tennessee State Routes; Interstate; US; State
← SR 22	US 23	→ SR 23
← SR 26	I-26	→ US 27
← SR 136	SR 137	→ SR 138

U.S. Route 23 (US 23) is a part of the United States Numbered Highway System that travels from Jacksonville, Florida, to Mackinaw City, Michigan. In the U.S. state of Tennessee, the highway travels 57.48 miles (92.51 km) in the northeastern part of the state from the North Carolina state line at Sam's Gap in the Bald Mountains to the Virginia state line in Kingsport. The entire route in Tennessee is a four-lane controlled-access highway and is concurrent with Interstate 26 (I-26) for most of its length. The freeway is also designated James H. Quillen Parkway for its entire length in Tennessee. US 23 in Tennessee is part of Corridor B of the Appalachian Development Highway System (ADHS) and serves as a major thoroughfare in the Tri-Cities region of the state. Although I-26 is technically an east–west route, the road predominantly travels in a north–south alignment in Tennessee. The highway reaches a maximum elevation of 3,760 feet (1,150 m) at the North Carolina state line, which is the highest elevation on the Interstate Highway System east of the Mississippi River.

US 23 was first established in Tennessee in 1930 following State Route 36 (SR 36), and paving of the route was completed the following year. The freeway was first authorized by the Appalachian Regional Development Act of 1965, and the stretch between Johnson City and the Virginia state line was constructed in segments between 1968 and 1986. In addition to US 23, this freeway was designated as State Route 137 (SR 137) and later Interstate 181 (I-181) and was commonly referred to as "Appalachian Highway" in its early years. In 1988, the American Association of State Highway and Transportation Officials (AASHTO) approved an extension of I-26 from Asheville, North Carolina, to I-81 in Tennessee. The remainder of the freeway was completed in 1995, and the stretch between the North Carolina state line and I-81 was redesignated as I-26 in 2003. After an initial denial, I-26 was extended north to Kingsport in 2007, replacing the remainder of I-181. Today, the mountainous stretch near the North Carolina state line is widely considered to be one of the most scenic stretches of Interstate Highway in the Eastern U.S.

== Route description ==
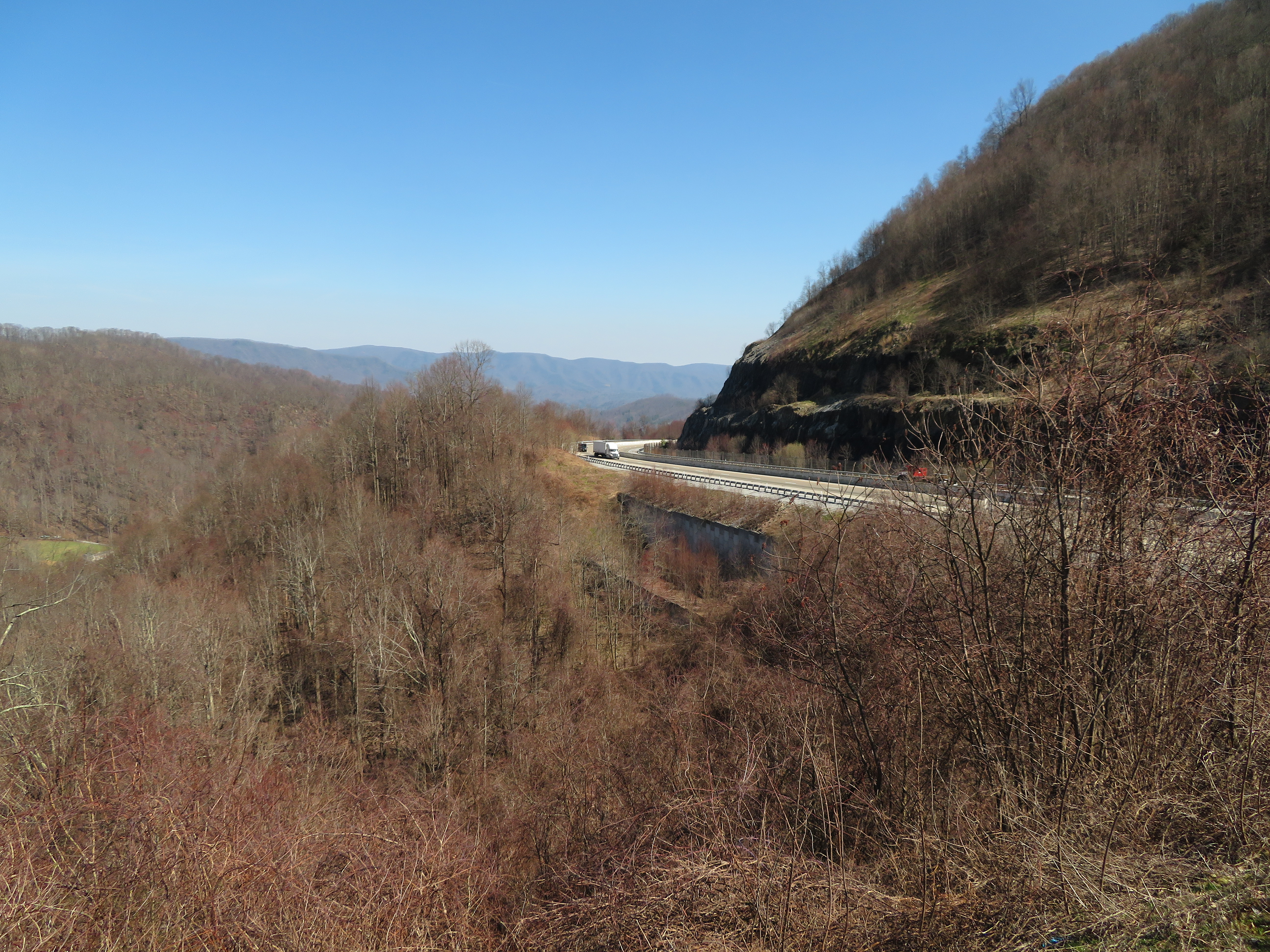
US 23 and I-26 in the Bald Mountains near the North Carolina state line

US 23 and I-26 are maintained by the Tennessee Department of Transportation (TDOT), along with all other Interstate, U.S., and state highways in Tennessee. In 2025, annual average daily traffic (AADT) volumes ranged from 67,272 vehicles per day between SR 381 and SR 354 north of Johnson City to 10,731 vehicles per day at the North Carolina state line, which is the lowest traffic volume on any mainline Interstate Highway in Tennessee.

US 23 and I-26 enter Tennessee in Unicoi County from North Carolina at an elevation of 3,760 feet (1,150 m) at Sam's Gap in the Bald Mountains, part of the Blue Ridge Mountains. This is the highest elevation on the Interstate Highway System east of the Mississippi River and is near the Appalachian Trail crossing. A large truck parking area is located here off the northbound lanes. The freeway immediately begins a steep descent with a 6% grade, and trucks are advised to slow to between 45 and 20 miles per hour (72 and 32 km/h), depending on their weight. Along this stretch, mesh nets are placed next to artificial rock cuts to mitigate the effects of rockslides. A scenic overlook is located off the southbound lanes about 1/2 mile (0.80 km) beyond the state line, and less than one mile (1.6 km) beyond this overlook is a runaway truck ramp in the northbound lanes. The highway continues descending and crosses several long bridges over steep valleys that also serve as wildlife underpasses. The northbound lanes then have a second runaway truck ramp near where the elevation drops below 3,000 feet (910 m). The freeway then rounds a relatively sharp curve and has its first interchange near the Flag Pond community. Turning northeast, the roadway continues to descend, with the grade gradually decreasing, and a northbound scenic overlook is provided a few miles later. The southern welcome center is located off the interchange with Clear Branch Road. Continuing its descent, the highway crosses additional valleys and drops below 2,000 feet (610 m) before beginning a concurrency with US 19W at an interchange in the Temple Hill community. The route then gradually levels out at the bottom of a deep mountain valley and reaches Erwin a couple of miles later.

Upon entering Erwin, US 19W/US 23/I-26 crosses the Nolichucky River. The freeway reaches the southern terminus of SR 81 and SR 107, the former of which also provides access to Jonesborough. It then leaves Erwin a few miles later and, gradually ascending a few hundred feet over the next few miles, enters the town of Unicoi, where it has an interchange with the western terminus of SR 173. Continuing through the same valley, the freeway gradually shifts into a more north–south alignment and briefly enters Carter County. An interchange is located at SR 359 where the highway enters Johnson City. The freeway zigzags over the next few miles before shifting mostly into a northwest-to-southeast alignment, crossing into Washington County, and entering the Ridge-and-Valley Appalachians. The roadway crosses a long viaduct over a railroad and several surface streets before reaching an interchange with US 321/SR 67, which connects to Elizabethton. Passing through the business district of Johnson City, the freeway has interchanges with multiple surface streets, including SR 91 and SR 400, and crosses multiple railroads and surface streets. The highway then proceeds through residential neighborhoods in the northern part of Johnson City and turns more northeastward before reaching a three-loop partial cloverleaf interchange with US 11E (North Roan Street), where US 19W splits off. Less than one mile (1.6 km) later is an interchange with SR 381 (State of Franklin Road). The freeway crosses a ridge before reaching SR 354 (Boones Creek Road), which provides access to nearby Jonesborough. Leaving Johnson City, the highway crosses additional ridges and proceeds through a mix of farmland and residential neighborhoods before reaching an interchange with SR 75 (Bobby Hicks Drive/Suncrest Drive) in the Gray community. The freeway passes through additional farmland and neighborhoods before crossing into Sullivan County. A short distance beyond is a cloverleaf interchange with I-81 near the Fordtown community, which serves Bristol (the third Tri-City) to the northeast and Knoxville to the southwest.

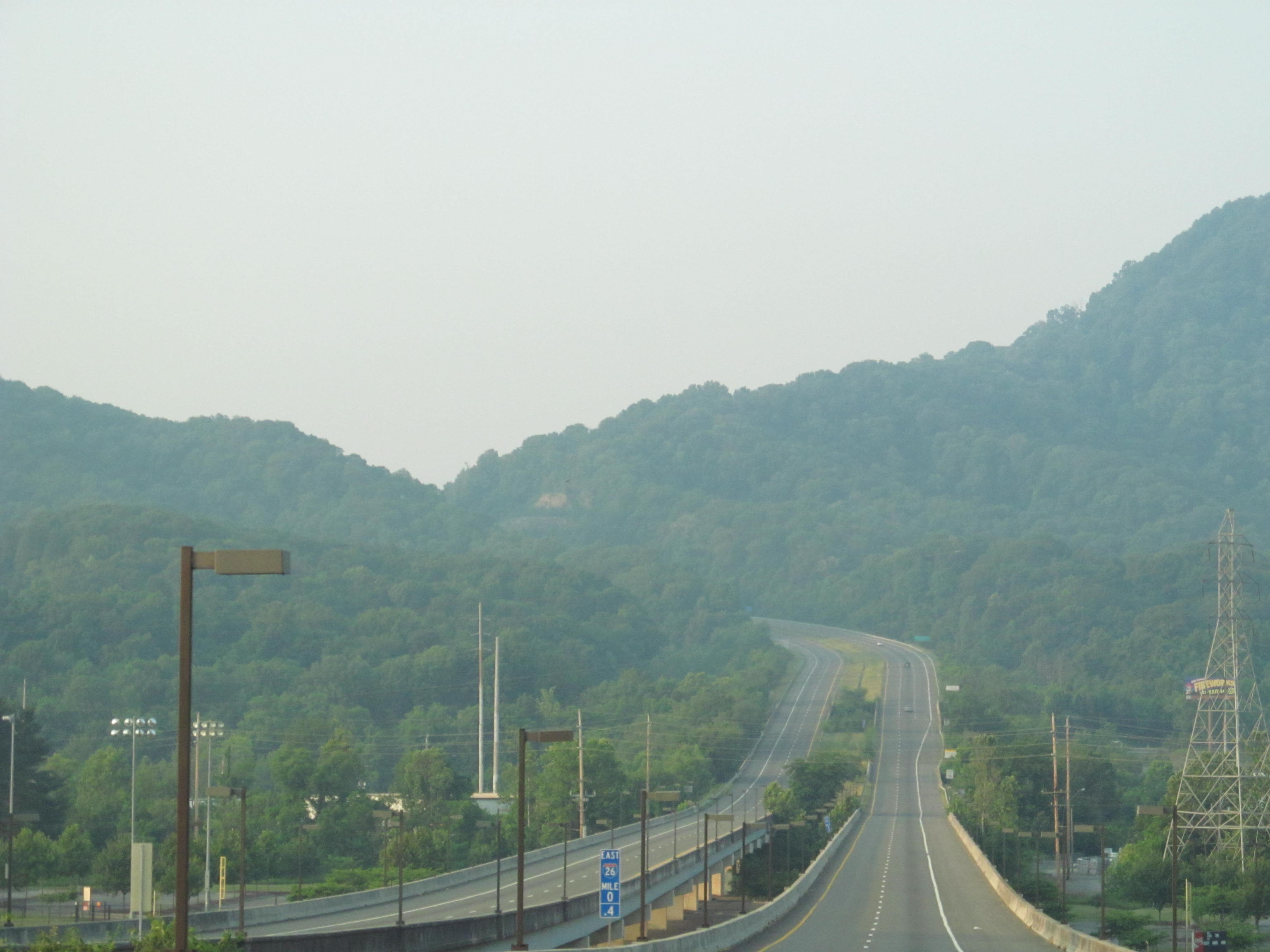
I-26 near its western terminus in Kingsport approaching the South Fork of the Holston River/Long Island and Bays Mountain

After interchanging with I-81, US 23 and I-26 curve sharply to the east, and sharply to the north immediately beyond. The freeway first has an interchange with SR 359 (Rock Springs Road), and one with an access road to the northern welcome center immediately beyond. Entering the outskirts of Kingsport, the freeway interchanges with SR 93 (Wilcox Drive, John B. Dennis Bypass), which serves as a bypass around the eastern side of Kingsport. The highway then ascends several hundred feet over the northern end of Bays Mountain, utilizing a northbound truck climbing lane and bypassing Kingsport to the west. It then descends this mountain, gaining a southbound truck climbing lane. Near the bottom of this descent, the highway crosses two railroads and then crosses the Holston River and the western end of Long Island, along with a third railroad, on a long pair of viaducts. Here, the freeway reaches its lowest elevation in Tennessee, at approximately 1,200 feet (370 m). It then has a partial cloverleaf interchange with US 11W (West Stone Drive), where I-26 reaches its western terminus. The freeway meanders over the next few miles through a residential area, before reaching a partial interchange with the northern terminus of SR 36 (Lynn Garden Drive) and SR 346 (Carters Valley Road). A pair of one-lane ramps carry US 23 traffic through this interchange into Virginia at the north end, and the road continues into Virginia as a four-lane divided highway without access control.

== History ==
=== Background and predecessors ===
The region that is now the northeastern corner of Tennessee was the first part of the state to be significantly explored and settled by European Americans. Longhunters from North Carolina and Virginia extensively explored the region in the 1750s and 1760s, which, at the time, was controlled by the Overhill Cherokee. These settlers utilized a series of Native American trails that traversed the region. By the late 1760s, the first permanent White settlements began to arise, which gradually developed into the cities along the present-day US 23 corridor of Elizabethton, Johnson City, Jonesborough, and Kingsport. These settlers founded the Watauga Association in 1772—a frontier pact generally regarded as the first constitutional government west of the Appalachian Mountains. The trail that would become part of US 19W through the Blue Ridge Mountains was utilized by the Overmountain Men—frontiersmen from west of the Blue Ridge Mountains who participated in the American Revolutionary War—in 1780. The East Tennessee and Western North Carolina Railroad, which came to be nicknamed the "Tweetsie", was chartered in 1866 for the purpose of transporting iron ore from mines in Cranberry, North Carolina. The first section, which ran between Hampton and Johnson City and passed through Elizabethton, opened in 1881. The tracks were completed into North Carolina the following year, providing the first efficient means of transportation across the mountains in this area. By 1890, a portion of the Clinchfield Railroad that ran through Kingsport, Johnson City, and Erwin was mostly complete. Also around this time, the network of trails that would become the US 23 corridor had also largely come into existence.

=== State and U.S. highway era ===
Original version of shield for US 23 in Tennessee

In 1915, the Tennessee Department of Highways and Public Works, the predecessor agency to TDOT, was established and tasked with establishing a state highway system. A proposal to construct a "wide road" between Johnson City and Asheville, North Carolina, reportedly existed as early as 1919. On October 1, 1923, the highway department established the Tennessee State Route System, the first numbered system of state highways in Tennessee. The network of roads that ran between the North Carolina state line at Spivey Gap and Kingsport were designated SR 36, and the short segment between Kingsport and the Virginia state line was designated SR 68. By 1928, SR 68 was renumbered as part of SR 36, and the former designation was applied to a different route. The portion of the route between the North Carolina state line at Spivey Gap and Johnson City became part of the Appalachian Scenic Highway auto trail in the mid-1920s. On November 11, 1926, the American Association of State Highway Officials (AASHO; predecessor agency to AASHTO) established the U.S. Numbered Highway System. An extension of US 23 was established by AASHO on May 26, 1930, with a complete concurrency with the road from the North Carolina state line at Spivey Gap to the Virginia state line in Kingsport. That same day, US 19W was established concurrent with the route from North Carolina to north of Johnson City. Signs were posted later that year. The road between Sam's Gap and US 19W/US 23 in Ernestville was designated as an extension of SR 81 in 1938. On June 8, 1951, AASHO approved a request by the North Carolina State Highway and Public Works Commission to reroute US 23 onto this road and the continuing North Carolina Highway 36 to the south.

Like most stretches of highway in Tennessee, the road was paved in segments. The contract to pave the then-unnumbered eight-mile (13 km) stretch between the North Carolina state line and SR 36 near Ernestville was awarded on August 10, 1919, and completed on May 14, 1920. On October 14, 1925, contracts were let to reconstruct the section in Sullivan and Washington counties. The Washington County project was completed on March 21, 1927, and the Sullivan County project on January 11, 1928. A project to grade and drain the 6.3-mile (10.1 km) section of SR 36 in Unicoi County between the North Carolina state line and Ernestville was let on December 11, 1925, and completed on September 10, 1927. Grading and drainage of the 9.4-mile (15.1 km) section between Erwin and the Carter County line was let on December 17, 1926, and finished on April 7, 1928. Paving of this stretch was let on March 30, 1928, and completed on June 20, 1929. Paving of the southernmost 3.1 miles (5.0 km) in Carter County was let on June 15, 1928, and completed on November 20 of that year. A contract to pave the 10-mile (16 km) section between the Sullivan–Washington county line and Johnson City was awarded on June 27, 1930, and work was completed on December 22 of that year. The final section in Tennessee to be paved, the 10.8-mile (17.4 km) section between Kingsport and the Virginia state line, was let to contract on February 20, 1931, and opened to traffic on July 8, 1931. Final construction activities were completed seven days later, and the highway was dedicated by then-Governor Henry Horton in a large ceremony near the Sullivan–Washington county line on July 17, 1931.

=== Appalachian Development Highway System and Interstate Highway era ===
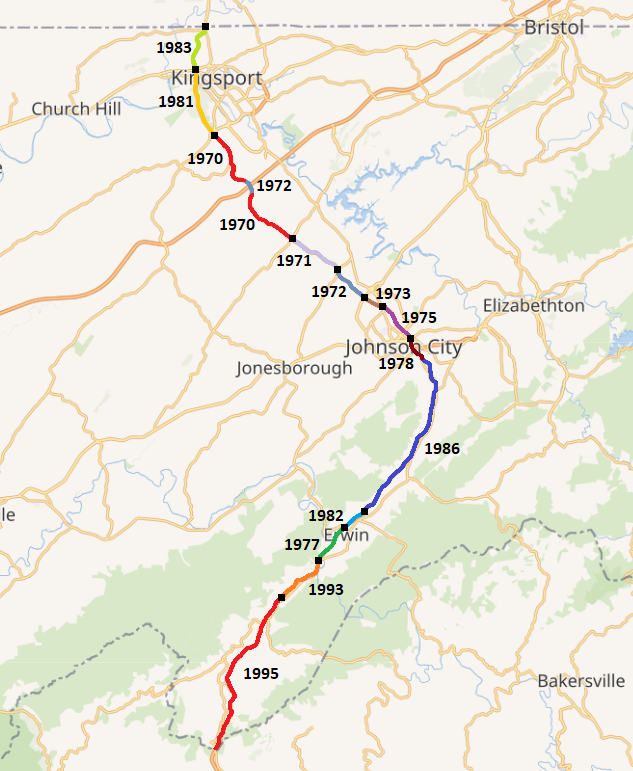
A diagram showing the year each section of the freeway opened. Black squares indicate sections separated by interchanges.

The widening of US 23 to a four-lane controlled-access highway between Asheville, North Carolina, and Johnson City, Tennessee, was authorized by the Appalachian Regional Development Act of 1965, which created the Appalachian Regional Commission (ARC) and the ADHS. This stretch was designated as part of Corridor B, and the project was known as Project A-10. On October 11, 1966, the ARC approved the first funds for right-of-way acquisition and construction of the first link, located between Johnson City and I-81.

The first contract for construction was awarded on February 23, 1968, for the 3.1-mile (5.0 km) stretch between SR 75 in Gray and south of I-81, and work was completed on October 5, 1970, but not opened to traffic to allow for completion of the I-81 interchange. In July 1968, contracts were awarded for the section between north of I-81 and SR 93, and between SR 354 (Boones Creek Road) near Johnson City and SR 75. The section between north of I-81 and SR 93 was declared complete on December 6, 1970. On January 9, 1971, the segment between SR 354 and SR 75 was opened. Construction on the 0.9-mile (1.4 km) section through the interchange with I-81 began on July 7, 1969, and work on the section between US 11E/US 19W (North Roan Street) in Johnson City and SR 354 commenced four months later. On November 17, 1972, two separate sections were opened; the short stretch through the interchange with I-81, and the segment between SR 381 in Johnson City and SR 354. The one-mile (1.6 km) section in Johnson City between US 11E/US 19W and SR 381 was completed in early 1973. The segment to the south between SR 400 (Unaka Avenue, Watauga Avenue) and US 11E/US 19W was awarded on December 17, 1971, and the adjacent section from SR 91 (Market Street) to SR 400 was contracted on April 27, 1973; both sections opened on July 1, 1975.

In Erwin, the section between Jackson–Love Highway and SR 81/SR 107, referred to at the time as the Erwin Bypass, was let in May 1975 and completed in early November 1977. The section between Plymouth Road south of US 321/SR 67 in southern Johnson City and SR 91 was announced to have been awarded in two contracts on February 5, 1975. It opened to northbound traffic on October 23, 1978, and to southbound traffic the following day, after nearly 16 months of delays. Work on the stretch between SR 93 and US 11W (West Stone Drive) in Kingsport began on December 12, 1977, and the stretch was dedicated and opened on November 13, 1981. This project proved to be one of the most complex highway projects along the route, requiring nearly 2.8 million cubic yards (2.1×10^{6} m^{3}) of earth and rock to be excavated from Bays Mountain, along with the twin bridges across the Holston River and Long Island. The second part of the Erwin Bypass, between SR 81/SR 107 and north of Main Street, opened on January 29, 1982. In Kingsport, the section between US 11W and the Virginia state line was contracted on January 5, 1981, and dedicated and opened on November 17, 1983. Contracts were awarded for the stretch between Main Street in Erwin and Plymouth Road south of Johnson City in April 1981 and January 1982, and the stretch was dedicated and opened by then-Governor Lamar Alexander on June 20, 1986, after multiple delays.

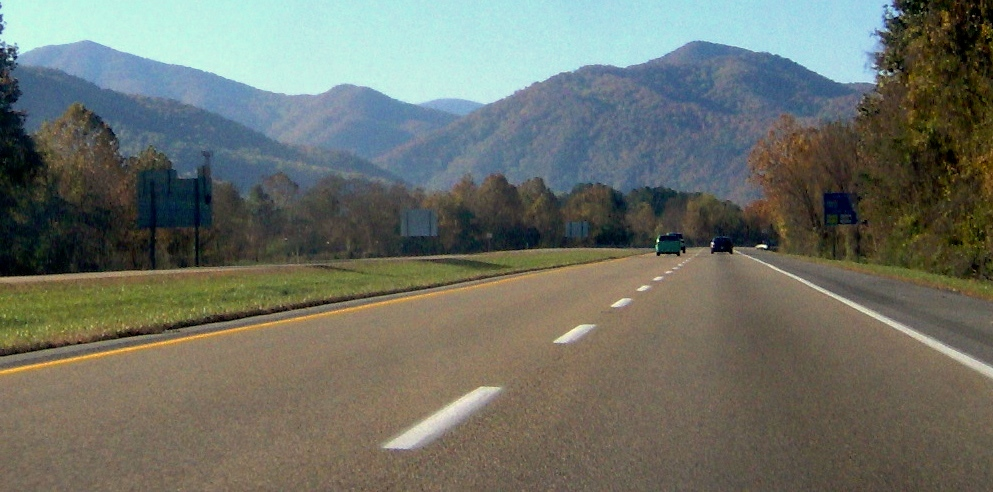
US 23 and I-26 near Erwin, with the Bald Mountains rising in the distance

While the Tennessee legislature continued to appropriate funds to construct the highway between Erwin and the Virginia state line, funds for ADHS corridors began lagging in the 1970s, and, by the end of that decade, plans to upgrade the stretch over the Bald Mountains had largely stalled. State Representative Zane Whitson of Erwin, who was elected in 1978, campaigned on reviving the project. A draft environmental impact statement (EIS) was prepared and approved by the Federal Highway Administration (FHWA) on January 16, 1984, and in August 1985, two planners from Johnson City suggested renumbering the route to I-181 to make the highway eligible for additional federal funds. In 1986, the extension through the Bald Mountains was included as one of six new freeway projects dubbed "Bicentennial Parkways" in the Better Roads Program, passed by the Tennessee General Assembly. This program, which had been proposed and spearheaded by Governor Alexander, increased the state's gasoline and diesel taxes to fund these freeway projects as well as a backlog of 15 projects that had been labeled as top priorities, and other projects. The project was referred to in the plan as the "Interstate 181 Extension" and was expected to cost $95.5 million (equivalent to $238 million in 2025) at the time. The project was further accelerated the following year by new Governor Ned McWherter. Construction would begin before the final EIS was approved on January 2, 1991, which would later prompt controversy.

The contract for the first section of the extension, 4.6 miles (7.4 km) between near the Temple Hill community and Jackson–Love Highway, was awarded on February 16, 1990. On May 1, 1990, a groundbreaking ceremony was held, officiated by Governor McWherter. The section between Flag Pond and Temple Hill was awarded on January 2, 1991, and the 2.8-mile (4.5 km) section between Carver Road (near the southernmost runaway truck ramp) and Flag Pond was awarded on May 21, 1991. Due to the mountainous setting, the project proved to be one of the most difficult and laborious projects ever undertaken by TDOT and required nearly 25 million cubic yards (19×10^{6} m^{3}) of rock and dirt to be moved. In September 1992, a lawsuit was jointly filed against TDOT by the Tennessee Environmental Council, the Tennessee Chapter of the Sierra Club, the Tennessee Scenic Rivers Association, and the Good Earth Defense Fund alleging violations of the National Environmental Policy and Clean Water acts. The suit was dropped when TDOT agreed to modify the design of the highway to be more environmentally conscious, which included additional erosion control measures and the construction of two wildlife underpass tunnels, nicknamed "bear boxes", under the highway. They also agreed to set up an environmental advisory agency for the department. On December 21, 1993, the section between US 19W and Jackson–Love Highway opened. On July 5, 1995, the final section opened to traffic in a dedication ceremony at Sam's Gap, officiated by then-Governor Don Sundquist, former Governor McWherter, and Representative Jimmy Quillen, along with other state and local officials. The final cost of the extension was $170 million (equivalent to $328 million in 2025).

=== Later history ===
In May 1989, the Tennessee General Assembly designated US 23 in Tennessee "James H. Quillen Parkway" after Quillen (1916–2003), a longtime U.S. Representative from the area. Quillen represented the state's first congressional district, which includes the entire highway, from 1963 to 1997, making him the state's longest serving member of Congress. During his tenure, Quillen worked to appropriate federal funds for the upgrading of US 23 to a freeway. The freeway through the Bald Mountains received the 1996 Award of Excellence in Highway Design from the FHWA for the efforts made by its designers and planners to protect the environment and preserve the natural integrity along the route, as well as the aesthetic benefits offered to motorists.

A total of three new interchanges have been added to the freeway since its initial construction. In 1975, an interchange was constructed with Eastern Star Road near Fordtown. Between January 1986 and October 1987, an at-grade intersection with SR 81/SR 107 in Erwin was replaced with an interchange in a project that also consisted of widening the latter route. This intersection had been the site of frequent accidents and brought the section up to freeway standards. An interchange with Tinker Road in Unicoi was constructed in 2003. While the freeway was still under construction in North Carolina, planning began for the construction of welcome centers near each terminus of the route in Tennessee. Construction began on the south welcome center, located off the Clear Branch Road exit, in October 2008, and the welcome center opened to the public on February 12, 2010. A grand opening ceremony was held on during National Tourism Week on May 14, 2010. An environmental assessment conducted in 2004 revealed the existence of caves underneath a proposed site for the north welcome center in Kingsport, forcing the state to choose an adjacent site to the south two years later. In September 2011, construction began on an interchange and access road to serve this welcome center. Initially slated for completion in September 2012, final work was not completed until July 2013. A groundbreaking ceremony for the construction of the welcome center was held on October 23, 2013, and the center opened to the public on November 25, 2014.

The Nolichucky River bridges in Erwin were partially collapsed by flooding caused by Hurricane Helene on September 27, 2024

The interchange with SR 381 was reconstructed into a single-point urban interchange between early 1998 and late 2001 in a project that also required the replacement and raising of the bridges on I-26/US 23. Between December 2013 and September 2015, the interchange with SR 75 in Gray was modified in a project that replaced the three-lane overpass with a five-lane overpass, added a dedicated offramp from US 23 southbound/I-26 eastbound to SR 75 southbound, and reconfigured the eastbound loop offramp to serve SR 75 northbound only. The diamond interchange with SR 354 was reconstructed into a diverging diamond interchange between July 2019 and May 2021 in a project that also included widening SR 354 through the interchange. On September 27, 2024, flooding from the aftermath of Hurricane Helene resulted in the partial destruction of the Nolichucky River bridges, and closure of the route between the North Carolina state line and SR 81/SR 107. The section between the state line and Jackson-Love Highway reopened to local traffic on October 10, 2024. On October 30, the remainder of the route was reopened after a temporary fill was constructed in the footprint of the collapsed southbound Nolichucky River bridge section, with traffic restricted to two lanes across the bridge, and loads wider than 10 feet (3.0 m) prohibited. On August 27, 2025, all lanes on both bridges were reopened to traffic after reconstruction of the bridges was completed.

=== Designation history ===
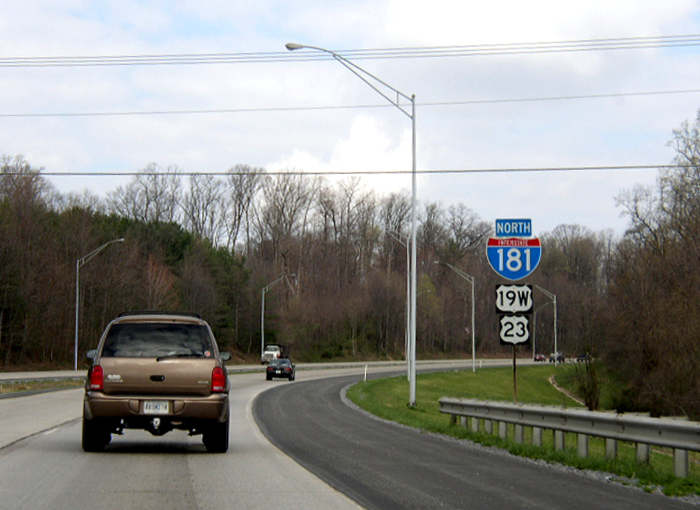
Signage for former I-181 in Johnson City in 2003

State Route 137
- Location: Kingsport, Tennessee–Virginia state line
- Length: 3.03 mi (4.88 km)
- Existed: 1968–present

Interstate 181
- Location: Johnson City–Kingsport
- Length: 23.85 mi (38.38 km)
- Existed: 1985–2007

Interstate 26
- Location: North Carolina state line–Kingsport, Tennessee
- Length: 54.45 mi (87.63 km)
- Existed: 2003–present

The controlled-access highway that ran between Johnson City and Kingsport was initially established as State Route 137 (SR 137), with this designation extended as new sections were completed. Although the route had come to be referred to as the new alignment for US 23 before construction began, it was not until June 28, 1982, that AASHTO approved rerouting US 23 onto the freeway from its original alignment with SR 36. This formed a concurrency with SR 137. On December 4, 1985, the stretch between I-81 and US 11W in Kingsport was renumbered as Interstate 181 (I-181) by the FHWA. The I-181 designation was formally approved and extended south to US 321/SR 67 in Johnson City by AASHTO on June 9, 1986. Both these redesignations replaced SR 137 but kept the US 23 designation, and exits were numbered according to US 23's mileage. This reduced SR 137 to its present-day designation between US 11W and the Virginia state line, all within Kingsport.

On June 7, 1988, AASHTO approved an extension of I-26 from North Carolina to I-81, contingent upon the completion and certification of the freeway in both states. On August 5, 2003, after completion of a nine-mile (14 km) adjacent section of controlled-access highway in North Carolina, I-26 was extended west into Tennessee, replacing I-181 from Johnson City to I-81. AASHTO initially ruled against an extension of the I-26 designation along the remainder of I-181 to Kingsport, however, since federal guidelines usually require mainline Interstate Highways to end at a junction with another Interstate Highway, an international border, or a seacoast. TDOT had proposed to renumber that stretch as I-126 but rescinded that proposal later that year. The Safe, Accountable, Flexible, Efficient Transportation Equity Act: A Legacy for Users, signed into law on August 10, 2005, authorized the remainder of I-181 to be redesignated as part of I-26. AASHTO formally approved the renumbering on May 5, 2006. In March 2007, I-181 was officially decommissioned and replaced with I-26 signage. In preparation for the extension of I-26, mileposts were renumbered from a south-to-north to a north-to-south sequence in May 2006 to match this designation. At the same time that I-181 signage was replaced, exit numbers were renumbered to match the new I-26 mileposts. In order to avoid confusing motorists, crews installed small signs listing the old exit numbers at each interchange, which were left in place for the next 18 to 24 months.

== Exit list ==
Old exit numbers were based on US 23 distances; new exit numbers are based on I-26 milemarkers.

County	Location	mi	km	Old exit	New exit	Destinations	Notes
Unicoi		0.00	0.00			I-26 east / US 23 south – Asheville	Continuation into North Carolina through Sam's Gap; I-26 mile 54.45
Unicoi		4.52	7.27	5	50	Flag Pond Road – Flag Pond	I-26 mile 49.93
Unicoi		8.10	13.04	9	46	Clear Branch Road – Welcome Center	Access to Tennessee Welcome Center; I-26 mile 46.35
Unicoi	Temple Hill	10.90	17.54	12	43	US 19W south (Temple Hill Road, SR 36) to SR 352	Southern end of US 19W concurrency; I-26 mile 43.55
Unicoi	Erwin	14.64	23.56	15	40	Jackson-Love Highway – Erwin	I-26 mile 39.81
Unicoi	Erwin	17.21	27.70	18	37	SR 81 north / SR 107 – Erwin, Jonesborough, Greeneville	Southern terminus of SR 81; I-26 mile 37.24
Unicoi	Erwin	18.72	30.13	19	36	Harris Hollow Road to SR 107 (North Main Ave) – Erwin	Signed as Main Street; I-26 mile 35.73
Unicoi	Unicoi	20.76	33.41	21	34	Tinker Road – Unicoi	I-26 mile 33.69
Unicoi	Unicoi	22.63	36.42	23	32	SR 173 east (Unicoi Road) – Unicoi	I-26 mile 31.82
Carter	Johnson City	27.49	44.24	28	27	SR 359 north (Okolona Road) – Milligan College, Unicoi	I-26 mile 26.96
Washington	Johnson City	30.58	49.21	31	24	US 321 / SR 67 – Elizabethton	I-26 mile 23.87
Washington	Johnson City	31.50– 31.55	50.69– 50.77	32	23	SR 91 (Market Street, Main Street)	I-26 miles 22.95-22.90
Washington	Johnson City	32.05– 32.12	51.58– 51.69	33	22	SR 400 (Unaka Avenue, Watauga Avenue)	I-26 miles 22.40-22.33
Washington	Johnson City	34.24	55.10	35	20	US 11E / US 19W north (North Roan Street, SR 34)	Northern end of US 19W concurrency; signed as exits 20A (south) and 20B (north) westbound; I-26 mile 20.21
Washington	Johnson City	35.40	56.97	36	19	SR 381 (North State of Franklin Road) – Bristol	I-26 mile 19.05
Washington	Johnson City	37.75	60.75	38	17	SR 354 (Boones Creek Road) – Jonesborough	I-26 mile 16.70
Washington	Gray	41.34	66.53	42	13	SR 75 (Suncrest Drive, Bobby Hicks Highway) – Gray	I-26 mile 13.11
Washington–Sullivan county line	Kingsport	44.59	71.76	45	10	Eastern Star Road	I-26 mile 9.86
Sullivan	Kingsport	45.70– 46.20	73.55– 74.35	46	8	I-81 – Knoxville, Bristol	Signed as exits 8A (south) and 8B (north); I-26 miles 8.75-8.25
Sullivan	Kingsport	48.11	77.43	49	6	SR 347 (Rock Springs Road)	I-26 mile 6.34
Sullivan	Kingsport	50.00– 50.41	80.47– 81.13	51	4	SR 93 (John B. Dennis Highway) to SR 126 (Wilcox Drive)	Signed as exits 4A (south) and 4B (north) eastbound; I-26 mile 4.45-4.04
Sullivan	Kingsport	50.95	82.00	52	3	Meadowview Parkway	I-26 mile 3.50
Sullivan	Kingsport	54.45	87.63	55	1	I-26 ends / SR 137 begins / US 11W (West Stone Drive, SR 1)	Western terminus of I-26; northern end of I-26 concurrency; southern terminus of SR 137; southern end of SR 137 concurrency
Sullivan	Kingsport	56.85– 57.48	91.49– 92.51	57	—	SR 36 south (Lynn Garden Drive) – Downtown Kingsport	Northbound left entrance extends into Virginia; left exit southbound
Sullivan	Kingsport	56.85– 57.48	91.49– 92.51			US 23 north – Gate City SR 137 ends	Continuation into Virginia; northern terminus of SR 137; northern end of SR 137 concurrency
1.000 mi = 1.609 km; 1.000 km = 0.621 mi: Concurrency terminus

== See also ==
- Special routes of U.S. Route 23

U.S. Route 23
Previous state: North Carolina	Tennessee	Next state: Virginia

Interstate 26
Previous state: Terminus	Tennessee	Next state: North Carolina
