= Tennessee State Route 400 =

State highway in Tennessee, United States

State Route 400
- TN 400 highlighted in red

Route information
- Maintained by TDOT
- Length: 10.9 mi (17.5 km)

Major junctions
- South end: SR 91 in Johnson City
- I-26 / US 23 / US 19W in Johnson City
- North end: US 321 / SR 67 in Elizabethton

Location
- Country: United States
- State: Tennessee
- Counties: Washington, Carter

Highway system
- Tennessee State Routes; Interstate; US; State
← SR 399	→ US 411

State Route 400 (SR 400) is a state highway in Washington and Carter counties in the U.S. state of Tennessee. It connects the cities of Johnson City, Watauga and Elizabethton.

== Route description ==
SR 400 begins as a pair of one way streets (Watauga and Unaka Avenues) at an intersection with SR 91 (which is also a pair of one way streets) in downtown Johnson City. It heads north to have an interchange with I-26/US 23/US 19W (Exit 22) and continues northeast as a pair of one way streets. The northbound lanes then leave Watauga Avenue and turn northwest onto North Broadway Street and joins to the southbound lanes as Unaka Avenue and continues northeast to the city of Watauga where SR 400 crosses over the Watauga River at the Johnson City/Watauga city boundary. SR 400 passes through downtown Watauga and turns more southeasterly and leaves the city of Watauga and continues southeast until it comes to an intersection with Old U.S. Route 19E. It then turns south and crosses over the Watauga River again and enters the city of Elizabethton and continues south until its northern terminus at an intersection with US 321/SR 67 in Elizabethton.

== Junction list ==
County	Location	mi	km	Destinations	Notes
Washington	Johnson City	0	0.0	SR 91 (West Main Street/West Market Street)	Southern terminus
Washington	Johnson City			I-26 / US 23 / US 19W – Kingsport, Asheville	I-26 exit 22
Carter				Old U.S. Route 19E	
Carter	Elizabethton			US 321 / SR 67 (Broad Street) – Johnson City, Roan Mountain, Mountain City	Northern terminus
1.000 mi = 1.609 km; 1.000 km = 0.621 mi
