= Tennessee State Route 381 =

State highway in Tennessee, United States

State Route 381
- State of Franklin Road

Route information
- Maintained by TDOT
- Length: 7.7 mi (12.4 km)
- Existed: July 1, 1983–present

Major junctions
- South end: US 321 / SR 67 in Johnson City
- US 321 / US 11E in Johnson City; I-26 / US 23 in North Johnson City
- North end: US 11E / US 19W in North Johnson City

Location
- Country: United States
- State: Tennessee
- Counties: Washington

Highway system
- Tennessee State Routes; Interstate; US; State
← SR 380	→ SR 382

State Route 381 (SR 381) is a state highway in Johnson City, Washington County, Tennessee. It serves as a bypass of Downtown on the north, west and south sides of the city. The route is also a retail corridor, lined with stores, restaurants and hotels.

== Route description ==
SR 381 begins on the south side of Johnson City at an intersection with US 321 and SR 67. US 321 and SR 381 run concurrently for 2.8 miles north, they then turn west and back north again, to a junction with US 11E where US 321 heads west along US 11E and SR 381 continues north through a retail area. SR 381 junctions with I-26 and US 23 exit 19 the route then has an interchange with SR 36 and SR 381 ends at an interchange with US 11E and US 19W on the north side of Johnson City.

== Junction list ==
The entire route is in Johnson City, Washington County.

mi	km	Destinations	Notes
0.0	0.0	US 321 north / SR 67 east (University Parkway) / SR 67 west (Cherokee Road) – Elizabethton, Lamar	Southern terminus; begin concurrency with US 321
1.0	1.6	University Parkway (North) and West State of Franklin Road (East) – Downtown Johnson City	End concurrency with University Parkway and Begin concurrency with West State of Franklin Road
2.8	4.5	US 11E / US 321 south (West Market Street/SR 34) – Greeneville, Bluff City	End concurrency with US 321
5.0	8.0	Hamilton Place Drive	Southbound Interchange only
6.2	10.0	I-26 / US 23 – Kingsport, Johnson City, Erwin	Single-point urban interchange; I-26/US 23 exit 19
6.9	11.1	SR 36 (North Roan Street) – Kingsport	Interchange
7.8	12.6	US 11E / US 19W (Bristol Highway/SR 34) – Bristol, Johnson City	Interchange; Northern terminus
1.000 mi = 1.609 km; 1.000 km = 0.621 mi: Concurrency terminus; Incomplete access
