= Cane River (North Carolina) =

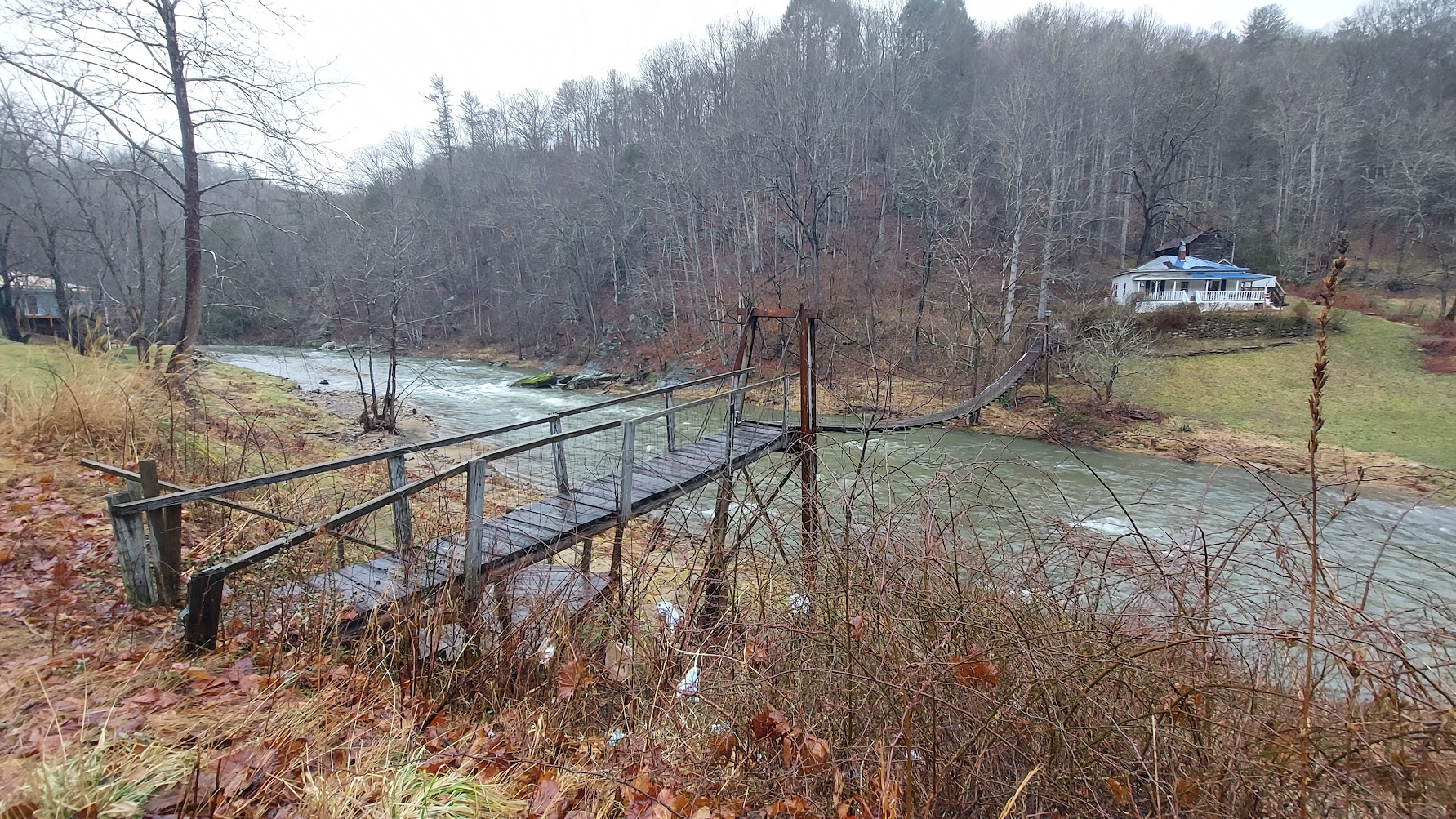
- One of the suspension bridges over the Cane River in Yancey County, North Carolina

- Location of the mouth of Cane River in North Carolina

Location
- Country: United States
- State: North Carolina
- County: Yancey

Physical characteristics
- Source: Confluence of Beech Nursery Creek and Blue Sea Creek
  - location: Eskota, North Carolina
  - coordinates: 35°45′55″N 82°18′33″W
  - elevation: 3,533 ft (1,077 m)
- Mouth: Nolichucky River
  - location: Huntdale, North Carolina
  - coordinates: 36°01′43″N 82°19′36″W
  - elevation: 2,024 ft (617 m)
- Length: 38.3 mi (61.6 km)
- Basin size: 408.79 square miles (1,058.8 km^{2})
- Discharge
  - location: Sioux, North Carolina
  - average: 248 cu ft/s (7.0 m^{3}/s)

Basin features
- Progression: Cane → Nolichucky → French Broad → Tennessee → Ohio → Mississippi → Gulf of Mexico
- River system: French Broad River

The Cane River is a 38.3-mile (61.6 km) river in Yancey County, North Carolina. It originates from the confluence of Beech Nursery Creek, off the western slope of Mount Mitchell, and Blue Sea Creek, off the northeastern slope of Blackstock Knob, in the Black Mountains. A tributary in the French Broad River basin, it flows northward to join the North Toe River, forming the Nolichucky River.

== Dams ==
The Cane River had one dam that existed, from 1908 to 2016, named the Cane River Dam. The reinforced concrete structure was 45 feet (14 m) tall and spanned 245 feet (75 m) wide, constructed to provide hydroelectric power for Yancey County. In 1940, a flood submerged the dam's powerhouse and in the 1950s the reservoir was drained as the dams' structural integrity declined. By the 1970s, another significant flood caused a partial breech. In 2008, the Blue Ridge Resource Conservation and Development, in conjunction with the U.S. Fish & Wildlife Service and the North Carolina Wildlife Resources Commission, began disassembling the dam and river restoration. Since the project's completion in October 2016, the Cane River has been dam free.

== Pollution ==
Historic instream gravel mining has altered the natural substrate and stream channel, in which the upper Cane River is more like a coastal plain braided stream. In 2004, several tributaries had high levels of fecal coliform bacteria. In 2008, the Burnsville Wastewater Treatment plant malfunctioned and spilled fecal coliform bacteria that was considered dangerous for human contact. The ecological damage from the incident had impacted the wildlife downstream from the wastewater plant, including the Appalachian elktoe. While improvements have been made to the wastewater facility, concerns remain after any heavy rain that the Yancey County Health Department issues precautionary advisories.

== See also ==
- List of North Carolina rivers
