= Appalachian Regional Development Act =

The Appalachian Regional Development Act of 1965 was the first act of Lyndon B. Johnson's Great Society Plan to clear the 89th Congress. The act established the Appalachian Regional Commission (ARC), which was tasked with overseeing economic development programs in the Appalachia region, as well as the construction of the Appalachian Development Highway System. Membership included representatives from New York, Pennsylvania, Ohio, Maryland, West Virginia, Virginia, Kentucky, Tennessee, North Carolina, South Carolina, Georgia, Alabama, and Mississippi, as well as one federal appointee. This Act is one of the longest serving place-based regional development programs in the United States and is the largest in terms of geographic scope.

== Background ==
In the 1960s, one in three Appalachians lived in poverty. Per capita income in the Appalachian region was 23 percent lower than the U.S. average, and high unemployment forced millions to seek work outside the region. Governors of Appalachian states and local development districts, aware of their region's issues, attempted to remedy those concerns. The local development districts lacked the necessary funds and resources to address these concerns meaningfully, while governors created joint committees indicating the need for regional development projects as early as 1960.John F. Kennedy's interest in the Appalachian region centered around West Virginia, where in 1958, two years before the 1960 presidential primaries began, he had pollster take a sampling of public opinion. In the Spring of 1960, Senator Kennedy and Senator Hubert Humphrey campaigned against each other, serving as an inflection point for public attention in Appalachia. Kennedy saw this as an opportunity to make an appeal to win labour-driven areas, taking media tours through the coal fields in West Virginia, drawing large swaths of media attention to the plight of the region.

In 1963, President John F. Kennedy created the President's Appalachian Regional Commission (PARC) "to prepare a comprehensive action program for the economic development of the Appalachian Region." This work was continued by President Lyndon B. Johnson after Kennedy's assassination. Johnson, feeling pressure to continue Kennedy's work, was receptive to Appalachian voices, using a PARC report as a basis for legislation. In 1964, he sent a request to Congress to send special aid to the economically depressed region as part of the War on Poverty. The Senate passed a bill close to the president's request, but the House failed to pass a bill before the 88th Congress adjourned. This meant a new bill needed to be introduced and passed in the Senate when the 89th Congress convened in January 1965.

== Legislative history ==
In 1965, Democratic Senator Jennings Randolph from West Virginia, who was chair of the Subcommittee on Public Roads of the Senate Committee on Public Works, wrote to West Virginia Senator Robert Byrd, requesting support for a bill that would provide aid to the Appalachian region. Because Robert Byrd came from the coal fields of Southern West Virginia, he readily agreed to co-sponsor the bill. On January 6, 1965, Senator Jennings Randolph introduced an administration-backed Appalachian aid bill (S.3) calling for more than $1 billion in federal assistance to the region. The Public Works Committee reported the bill to the Senate on January 27, 1965, with proposed and summarily struck-down amendments made by individuals like Wisconsin Senator Gaylord Nelson (D-Wisconsin), seeking to tack on other depressed areas of the country to the recipients of aid in the bill. The Senate passed the bill on February 1, 1965, with a vote of 62-22.

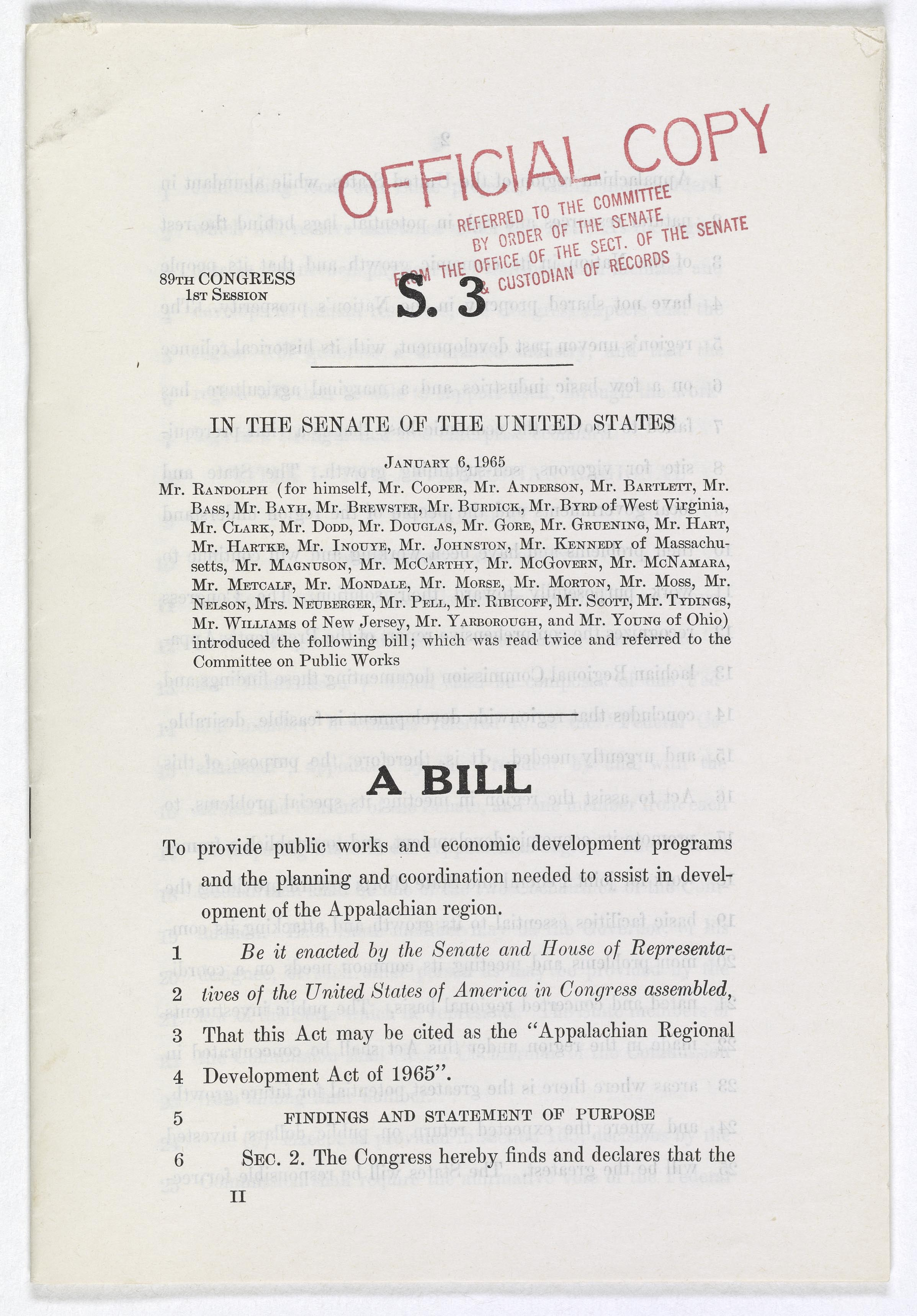
The Senate passed the Appalachian Regional Development Act (S.3) on February 1, 1965.

The House of Representatives reported the Senate version of the bill on February 17, 1965, proceeding to pass the bill without change, taking a 257-165 roll call vote on March 3, 1965. There were attempts by figures in the House like Gerald Ford to provide an alternative to the development programs stipulated in the bill, but it was perceived as "hastily put together" and even saw lacking support from fellow Republicans.

President Johnson signed the Appalachian Regional Development Act of 1965 into law on March 9, 1965. The act established the Appalachian Regional Commission (ARC). Its membership included representatives from New York, Pennsylvania, Ohio, Maryland, West Virginia, Virginia, Kentucky, Tennessee, North Carolina, South Carolina, Georgia, Alabama, and Mississippi.

== Major provisions ==
=== Appalachian Regional Commission ===
- Created a commission to coordinate projects authorized by the bill and develop economic programs for initially 360 counties in Appalachia
- One federal representative appointed by the President, confirmed by the Senate and governor of the representative's state
- Decisions needed approval from the federal representative and the majority of state representatives before they could be made
- $2.2 million provided for start-up administrative expenses, with an agreement that the financial burden would be shared after that ran out

=== Appalachian Development Highway System ===
- Appropriates over $800 million to the construction of up to 2,350 miles of development highways and 1,000 miles of access roads within the region
- Expected completion upon passage was 1971, being the largest special project on the bill in terms of both defined scale and spending
- States would contribute to at least $360 million for the highways

=== Alternative special programs ===
- The bill authorized the rest of the billion dollars to go toward special programs and projects within the region which included:
  - Building health facilities and vocational schools
  - Reclaiming mining areas and land improvement
  - Development of timber and water resources
- The federal contributions were meant to be used to cover funding for the first two years of the programs, hoping to get them off the ground
- Programs can be authorized and appropriated funds at the Regional Commission's discretion

== Impact ==
In 2010, a study showed that the 1965 Act reduced Appalachian poverty between 1960 and 2000 by 4.2 percentage points relative to border counties, or about 10 percent on the baseline 1960 poverty rate, and real per capita incomes grew about 4 percent faster. A 2019 study found that the construction of the Appalachian Development Highway System led to economic net gains of $54 billion (approximately 0.4 percent of national income) and boosted incomes in the Appalachian region by reducing the costs of trade.

== External resources ==
The Great Society Congress
