= Sioux, North Carolina =

- Unincorporated community
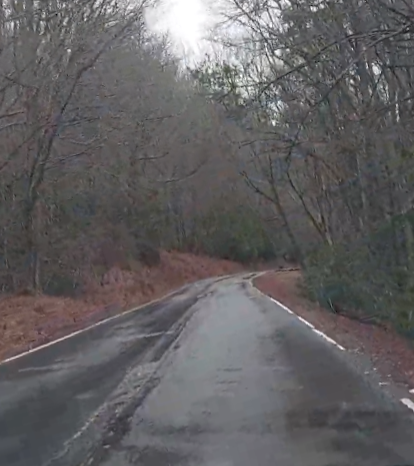
- U.S. Route 19W southbound outside of Sioux

- Location within the state of North Carolina
- Coordinates: 36°01′16.4″N 82°21′42.2″W
- Country: United States
- State: North Carolina
- County: Yancey
- Elevation: 3,268 ft (996 m)

Population (2020)
  - Total: ~30
- Time zone: UTC-5 (Eastern (EST))
  - Summer (DST): UTC-4 (EDT)
- ZIP code: 28714
- Area code: 828
- GNIS feature ID: 1022645

Sioux is an unincorporated community in far northern Yancey County, North Carolina, in the Ramseytown Township located alongside Big Creek, a tributary of the Cane River.

== History ==
Sioux formerly had a post office. It was established on September 6, 1887, and closed on September 30, 1955. The first postmaster was Spencer P. Atkins (1858–1928). Also in Sioux is the abandoned J.C. Bailey General Store, operated by early Yancey County settler John C. "Yellow Jacket" Bailey.

== Transportation ==
U.S. Route 19W runs through Sioux.
