= U.S. Route 19W =

Suffixed section of U.S. Highway in Tennessee and North Carolina

U.S. Route 19W
- US 19W highlighted in red

Route information
- Auxiliary route of US 19
- Length: 62.9 mi (101.2 km)
- Existed: 1930–present

Major junctions
- South end: US 19 / US 19E in Cane River, NC
- I-26 / US 23 near Erwin, TN
- North end: US 11E / US 19 / US 19E near Bluff City, TN

Location
- Country: United States
- States: North Carolina, Tennessee
- Counties: NC: Yancey; TN: Unicoi, Carter, Washington, Sullivan

Highway system
- United States Numbered Highway System; List; Special; Divided
- North Carolina Highway System; Interstate; US; State; Scenic
- Tennessee State Routes; Interstate; US; State
← US 19E	NC	→ NC 20
← US 19E	TN	→ SR 20

U.S. Route 19W (US 19W) traverses approximately 63 miles (101 km) from Cane River, North Carolina, to Bluff City, Tennessee.

== Route description ==
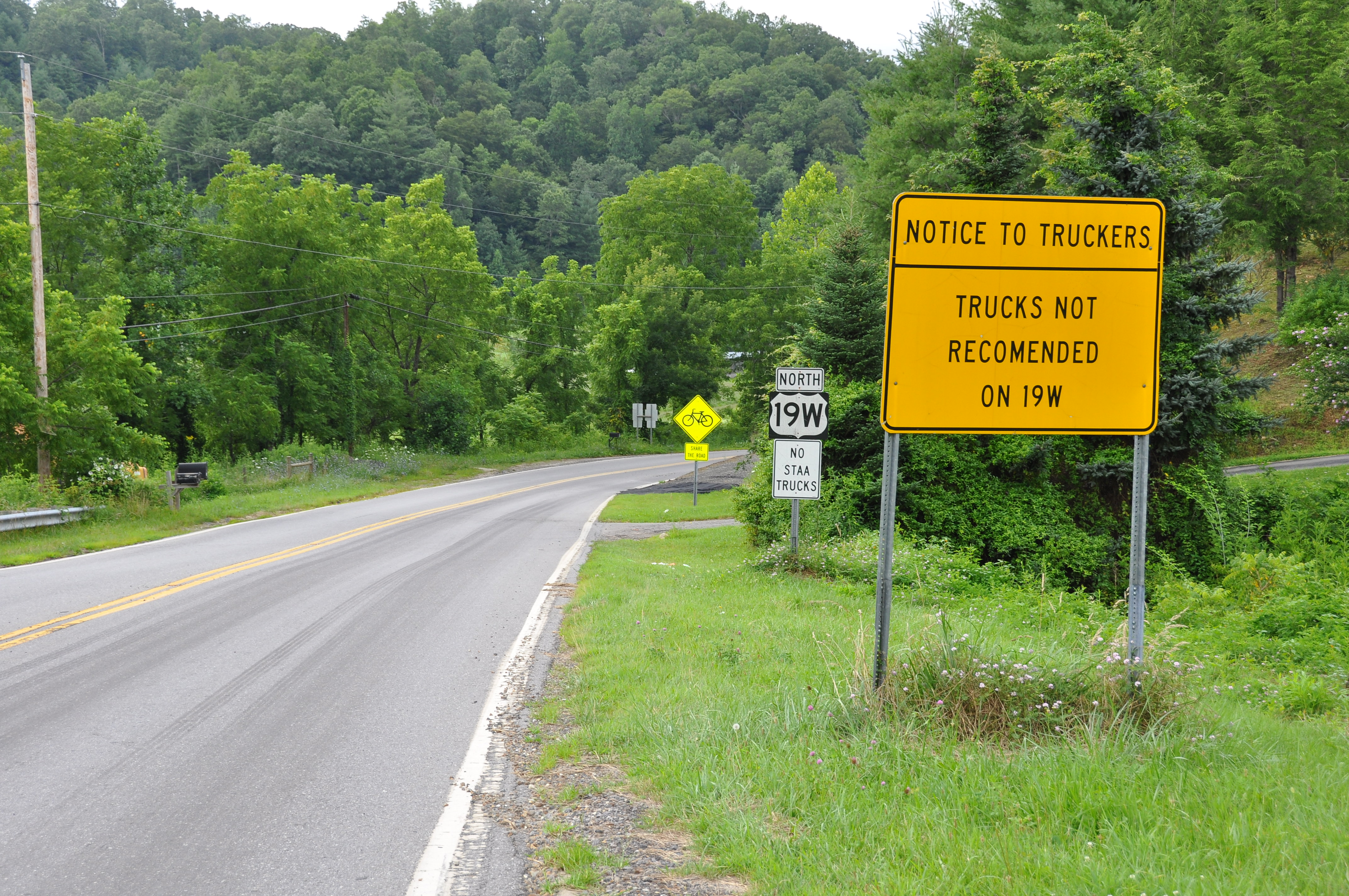
A misspelled sign stating that trucks are "not recommended" on US 19W.

US 19W begins in North Carolina in western Yancey County in the community of Cane River, at the intersection of US 19/US 19E. Several signs at the beginning of the route strongly recommend truckers against using this route. The road then proceeds north through Pisgah National Forest, connecting the communities of Elk Shoal, Ramseytown, and Sioux, to the Tennessee state line (near Spivey Gap), a 22-mile (35 km) drive of frequent curves and elevation changes.

Once past the state line in Tennessee, the road enters the Cherokee National Forest and is much the same for another 6.3 miles (10.1 km) to State Route 352 (SR 352)/Flag Pond Road. From Flag Pond Road, it is just one mile (1.6 km) to Interstate 26 (I-26), where US 19W merges with the Interstate to Johnson City. US 19W overlaps with I-26/US 23 from exit 43 (Hill Road) to exit 20 (Roan Street). There it leaves I-26 and continues north on the Bristol Highway, overlapped with US 11E, for 9.4 miles (15.1 km), after which it reconnects with US 19E to reform US 19 near Bluff City.

== History ==
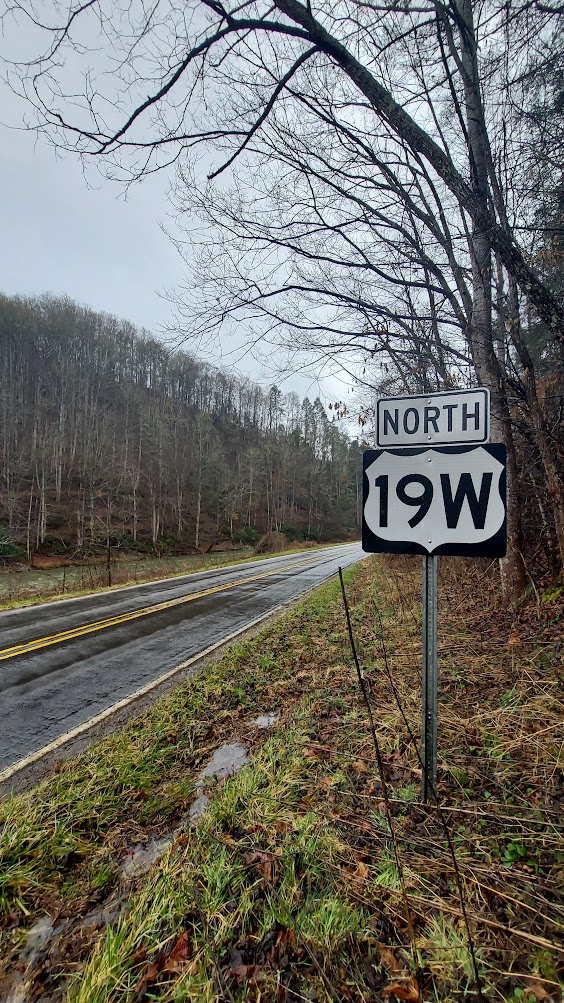
US 19W in Ramseytown

Established in 1930, US 19 was split at Cane River into US 19E and US 19W. US 19E follows the original routing via Spruce Pine and Elizabethton to Bluff City. US 19W was rerouted with US 23 and North Carolina Highway 692 (NC 692) into Tennessee, then through the cities of Erwin and Johnson City, before rejoining US 19E in Bluff City. In late 1934, NC 692 was dropped along the route; then, in 1952, US 23 abandoned US 19W in North Carolina by rerouting west through Faust and Wolf Laurel, meeting back at Ernestville. In 1984, US 19 was realigned on a straighter path in Yancey County; US 19W was thus extended 0.4 miles (0.64 km).

In late September 2024, several large sections of US 19W was washed out by the effects of Hurricane Helene in North Carolina. In November, the North Carolina Department of Transportation (NCDOT) stated that it expects to spend $1 billion to rebuild the two-lane highway, which could take six to 10 years. A new, permanent US 19W would be to modern standards, which likely mean wider shoulders and possibly wider travel lanes; concrete walls will also be used instead of earthen embankments in some places. Until then, temporary gravel roads are being used to connect isolated communities.

=== North Carolina Highway 692 ===
North Carolina Highway 692
- Location: Cane River–Tennessee state line
- Length: 21.6 mi (34.8 km)
- Existed: 1923–1930

North Carolina Highway 692 (NC 692) was established in 1923 as new primary routing to Tennessee; NC 692 was the original highway number from Cane River to Spivey Gap. In 1929, NC 692 was truncated at Sioux, replaced by an extension of NC 19 from Bakersville. In 1930, US 19W and US 23 were overlapped on the remaining section of NC 692. In late 1934, NC 692 was decommissioned.

== Junction list ==
State	County	Location	mi	km	Destinations	Notes
North Carolina	Yancey	Cane River	0.0	0.0	US 19 south / US 19E north – Asheville, Burnsville	US 19 splits into US 19E and US 19W; southern terminus
North Carolina	Yancey		15.1	24.3	Huntdale Road – Huntdale	
			21.9 0.0	35.2 0.0	North Carolina–Tennessee state line	
Tennessee	Unicoi	Ernestville	6.3	10.1	SR 352 west (Flag Pond Road) – Flag Pond	Eastern terminus of SR 352
Tennessee	Unicoi	Temple Hill	7.5	12.1	I-26 east / US 23 south – Asheville	East end of I-26 and south end of US 23 overlap
Tennessee	See Interstate 26 (exits 43 to 20)					
Tennessee	Washington	Johnson City	31.0	49.9	I-26 west / US 23 north / US 11E south (Roan Street / SR 34) – Kingsport	West end of I-26, south end of US 11E/SR 34, north end of US 23 overlap
Tennessee	Washington	Johnson City	31.5	50.7	SR 36 north (North Roan Street) – Boones Creek, Kingsport	North end of SR 36 overlap
Tennessee	Washington	Johnson City	32.0	51.5	SR 381 south (State of Franklin Road) – Kingsport	Northern terminus of SR 381
Tennessee	Sullivan	Bluff City	41.0	66.0	US 11E north / US 19 north (SR 34) / US 19E south (SR 37) – Bristol, Bluff City, Elizabethton	Northern terminus of US 19E and 19W; 19E and 19W come together to form US 19
1.000 mi = 1.609 km; 1.000 km = 0.621 mi: Concurrency terminus

== See also ==
Preceded by North Carolina	U.S. Route 19; US 19W; US 19E	Succeeded by Tennessee
