= Pine Crest, Tennessee =

Pine Crest
- CDP
- Location of Pine Crest, Tennessee
- Coordinates: 36°17′48″N 82°18′29″W
- Country: United States
- State: Tennessee
- County: Carter

Area
  - Total: 1.93 sq mi (5.00 km^{2})
  - Land: 1.93 sq mi (5.00 km^{2})
  - Water: 0 sq mi (0.00 km^{2})
- Elevation: 1,677 ft (511 m)

Population (2020)
  - Total: 2,439
  - Density: 1,264.4/sq mi (488.17/km^{2})
- Time zone: UTC-5 (Eastern (EST))
  - Summer (DST): UTC-4 (EDT)
- ZIP code: 37601
- Area code: 423
- FIPS code: 47-58240
- GNIS feature ID: 1639458

Pine Crest is a census-designated place (CDP) in Carter County, Tennessee, United States. The population was 2,388 at the 2010 census. It is part of the Johnson City Metropolitan Statistical Area, which is a component of the Johnson City–Kingsport–Bristol, TN-VA Combined Statistical Area – commonly known as the "Tri-Cities" region.

== Geography ==
Pine Crest is located at 36°17′48″N 82°18′29″W (36.296684, -82.308041).

According to the United States Census Bureau, the CDP has a total area of 1.8 square miles (4.7 km^{2}), all of it land.

== Demographics ==
Historical population
Census	Pop.	Note	%±
2020	2,439		—
U.S. Decennial Census

As of the census of 2000, there were 2,872 people, 1,315 households, and 799 families residing in the CDP. The population density was 1,333.7 inhabitants per square mile (514.9/km^{2}). There were 1,472 housing units at an average density of 683.6 per square mile (263.9/km^{2}). The racial makeup of the CDP was 96.38% White, 1.25% African American, 0.38% Native American, 0.24% Asian, 0.24% from other races, and 1.50% from two or more races. Hispanic or Latino of any race were 0.70% of the population.

There were 1,315 households, out of which 24.7% had children under the age of 18 living with them, 48.3% were married couples living together, 9.3% had a female householder with no husband present, and 39.2% were non-families. 31.7% of all households were made up of individuals, and 7.8% had someone living alone who was 65 years of age or older. The average household size was 2.18 and the average family size was 2.74.

In the CDP, the population was spread out, with 19.3% under the age of 18, 12.5% from 18 to 24, 31.5% from 25 to 44, 23.5% from 45 to 64, and 13.1% who were 65 years of age or older. The median age was 36 years. For every 100 females, there were 95.8 males. For every 100 females age 18 and over, there were 93.2 males.

The median income for a household in the CDP was $30,069, and the median income for a family was $40,820. Males had a median income of $26,661 versus $20,654 for females. The per capita income for the CDP was $16,670. About 6.6% of families and 11.8% of the population were below the poverty line, including 13.1% of those under age 18 and 7.1% of those age 65 or over.
