= Bittern (disambiguation) =

Bittern is a classification of wading birds in the heron family.

Bittern may also refer to:

== Places ==
- Bittern, Victoria, a town in Australia
  - Bittern railway station, on the Stony Point line
- Bittern Lake, a village in Alberta, Canada
- Bittern Line a railway in Norfolk, England

== Vehicles ==
- LNER Class A4 4464 Bittern, a preserved British steam locomotive
- Boulton Paul Bittern, a British fighter aircraft design of the 1920s
- HMS Bittern, the name of seven ships of the Royal Navy
- USS Bittern, several ships in the United States Navy
- Bittern-class sloop a three-ship class of long-range escort vessels used in the Second World War by the Royal Navy

== Other ==
- Bittern (salt), a waste product of solar salt operations rich in magnesium sulfate
- Operation Bittern, a British military operation in World War II

== See also ==
- Bitterne, a suburb of Southampton, England
- Bitter (disambiguation)
