= Little Doe River =

Coordinates: 36.2284457°N 82.1887409°W

Location
- Country: United States
- State: Tennessee

Physical characteristics
- Source
  - location: Simerly Creek and Tiger Creek
  - elevation: 1,788 ft (545 m)
- Mouth
  - location: Doe River

The Little Doe River is a river located in Carter County, Tennessee. It forms from the confluence of Simerly Creek and Tiger Creek near the community of Tiger Valley, and runs in a northerly direction alongside U.S. Route 19E until its termination into Doe River just south of the town of Hampton, Tennessee.

== See also ==
- List of rivers of Tennessee
