= Kyūroku-jima =

Islets of Aomori Prefecture, Japan

Native name: Japanese: 久六島
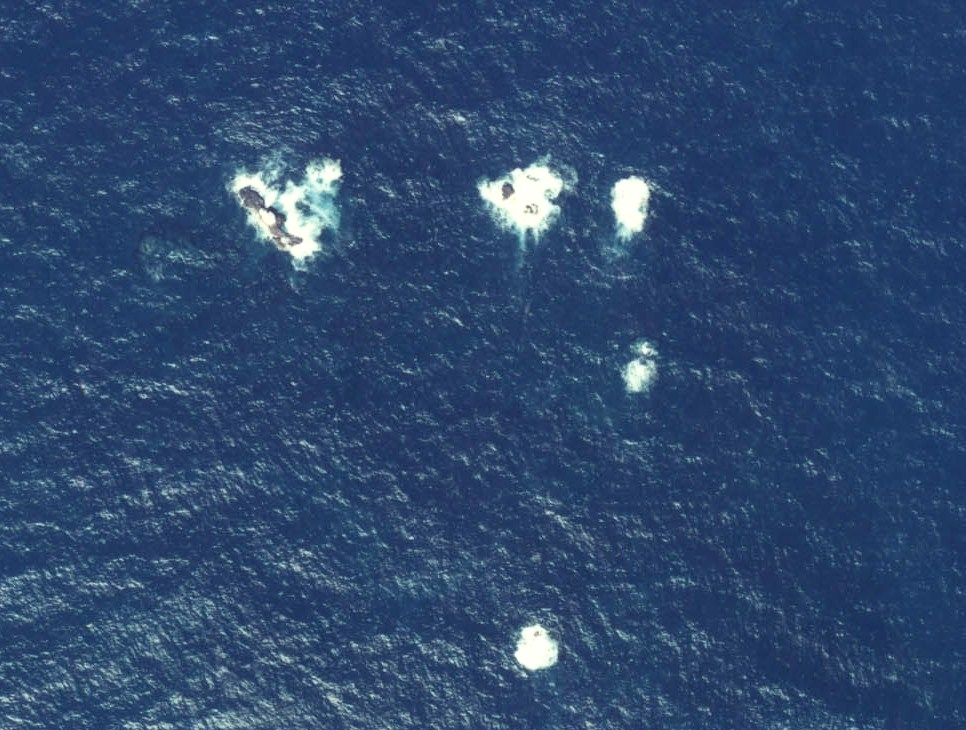
- Aerial photograph of Kyūroku-jima

- Location within Japan

Geography
- Location: Sea of Japan
- Coordinates: 40°32′0″N 139°29′58″E
- Highest elevation: 4.7 m (15.4 ft)

Administration
- Japan
- Prefecture: Aomori Prefecture
- Town: Fukaura

Demographics
- Population: 0
- Pop. density: 0/km^{2} (0/sq mi)

Kyūroku-jima (久六島) is a group of islets in the Sea of Japan about 30 kilometers (19 mi) west of the Japanese main island of Honshu. It is administered as part of the town of Fukaura in Aomori Prefecture and is the prefecture's westernmost point. The islets are the peaks of a submarine volcano.

== Geography ==
Kyūroku-jima is located 30 kilometers (19 mi) west of Honshu, and is Aomori Prefecture's westernmost point. The islets are the peaks of a submarine volcano.

The islets are surrounded by rocky reefs that are difficult to navigate, but the largest island has a quay built on to it. Due to this difficulty, the Japan Coast Guard only visits the islands once a year to do inspections on their lighthouse.

== Geology ==
The volcano that makes up Kyūroku-jima formed about 3.32 million years ago. The rock that is above the ocean surface is made up of dark-colored alkali basalt and a yellow tuff, each of which are distinctly visible to visitors. The islets of Kurokushima are the peaks of a horseshoe-shaped caldera that rises about 1,000 meters (3,300 ft) from the surrounding seafloor. It is comparable to nearby Mount Iwaki, which also has a prominence of around 1,000 meters (3,300 ft) relative to Shirakami-Sanchi.

== History ==
Kyūroku-jima was charted in 1786 by merchants, though the area had been known as a fishing ground since the sixteenth century when a fisherman named Kyūroku crashed on the islands, giving them their name. The islets were first observed by Europeans in 1855, when the crew of HMS Bittern spotted them covered in seals. The crew named the islets the Bittern Rocks, a name that stuck with Western sources at least until the beginning of the twentieth century.

Because of the abundance of Okhotsk atka mackerel, abalone, and kelp, the jurisdiction of the islets were disputed between the prefectures of Aomori and Akita until it was added to Aomori in 1953 and Akita received a common right of use.

On 20 October 1959, a 20-meter-high (66 ft) unmanned lighthouse began operation, the lighting of which has a range of 7.5 kilometers (4.7 mi).

== Transportation ==
The only way the islets can be accessed is by chartering a fishing boat. It takes about two hours to reach the islands from Fukaura.
