= Bitter =

Bitter may refer to:

== Common uses ==
- Resentment, negative emotion or attitude, similar to being jaded, cynical or otherwise negatively affected by experience
- Bitterness, one of the five basic tastes

== Books ==
- Bitter (novel), a 2022 novel by Akwaeke Emezi

== Food and drink ==
- Bitter (beer), a British term for pale ale
- Bitters, an herbal preparation with bitter flavour now used mostly in cocktails
- A category of plants with bitter flavour, many dark leafy greens

== Music ==
=== Albums ===
- Bitter (Jupiter Apple album), 2007
- Bitter (Meshell Ndegeocello album), 1999

=== Songs ===
- "Bitter" (Fletcher song) (2020)
- "Bitter", by Lit from Tripping the Light Fantastic, 1997
- "Bitter", by Reks from More Grey Hairs
- "Bitter", by Remy Zero from The Golden Hum
- "Bitter", by Freya Ridings from Blood Orange, 2023
- "Bitter", by Shihad
- "Bitter", by Jill Sobule from Happy Town, 1997
- "Bitter", by The Vamps from Cherry Blossom

== Other uses ==
- Bitter (surname) (including a list of persons with the name)
- Bitter Cars, a German car company

== See also ==
- Bitter end (disambiguation)
- Bitterlich (disambiguation)
- Bittern (disambiguation)
- The Bitter End (disambiguation)
