= Flight 308 =

Flight 308 may refer to:

- Southeast Airlines Flight 308, crashed on 8 January 1959
- Pacific Air Lines Flight 308, crashed on October 29, 1959
