= Holston Mountain =

Mountain in United States of America

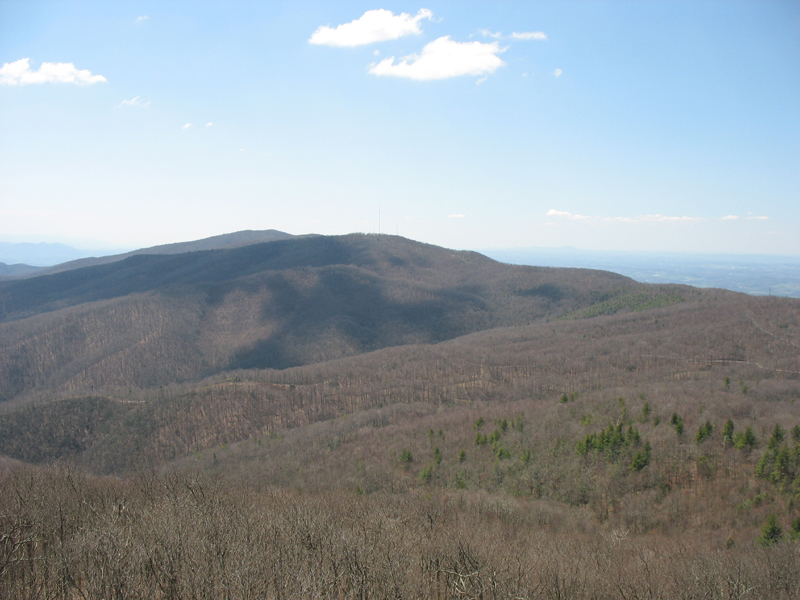
- Holston High Point as seen from Holston High Knob.

Highest point
- Elevation: 4,280+ feet (1,305+ m)("Holston High Point" summit)
- Prominence: 1,600 ft (490 m)
- Coordinates: 36°26′N 82°8′W

Geography
- Location: Tennessee and Virginia, U.S.
- Parent range: Appalachian Mountains, Blue Ridge Mountains
- Topo map: USGS Keenburg

Holston Mountain is a mountain ridge in Upper East Tennessee and southwest Virginia, in the United States. It is in the Blue Ridge Mountains part of the Appalachian Mountains. Holston Mountain is a very prominent ridge-type mountain in Tennessee's Ridge and Valley Region, about 28 miles (45 km) long, running from southwest to northeast, covering about 268 square miles (690 km^{2}). Its highest summit is Holston High Point, on which a Federal Aviation Administration (FAA) aircraft navigational beacon is located, at an elevation of 4,280 feet (1,300 m) above mean sea level. The second and third highest points are Rye Patch Knob, at 4,260 feet (1,300 m) above mean sea level and Rich Knob, at 4,240 (1,292.3 m) above mean sea level respectively. The fourth highest point is Holston High Knob where an old dismantled Cherokee National Forest fire tower (now a Communications Tower) marks the elevation at 4,136 feet (1,261 m) above mean sea level.

== Geography ==
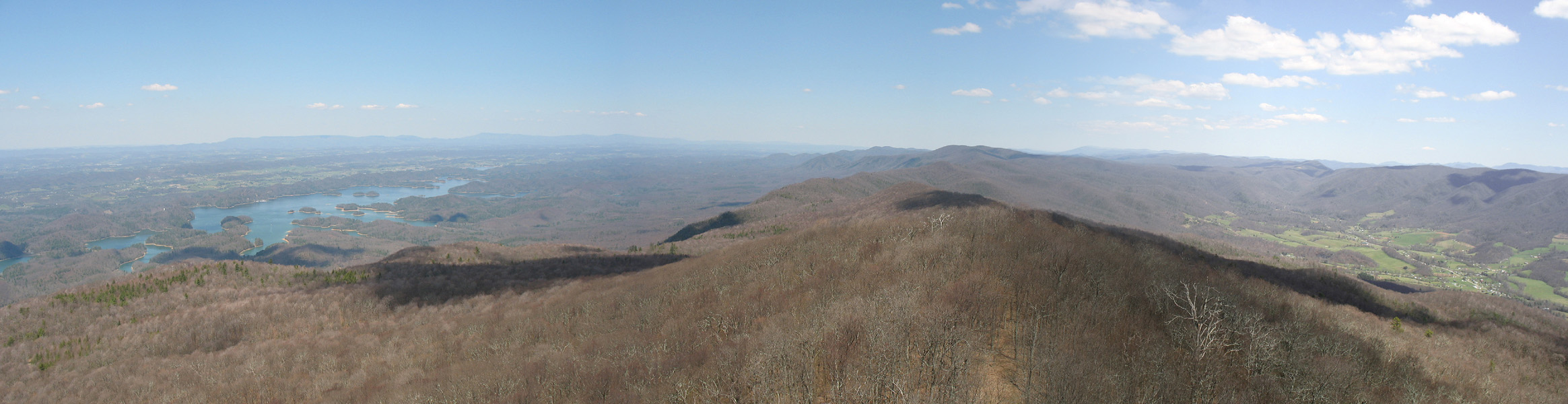
Panoramic view looking northeast towards Johnson County, TN along spine of Holston Mountain from Holston High Knob. South Holston Lake (Sullivan County, TN) is on the left and the Stony Creek Community (Northeast Carter County, TN) is on the right side.

Holston Mountain is located in the Cherokee National Forest. It is bounded on the northwest by South Holston Lake; on the southeast by Stoney Creek Valley, Shady Valley, and the Iron Mountains; on the northeast by the town of Damascus, Virginia; and on the southwest near the community of Biltmore, Tennessee.

The southern portion of Holston Mountain marks the boundary between Sullivan County and Carter County; the northern portion is between Sullivan and Johnson County. The small northernmost portion extends into Washington County, Virginia.

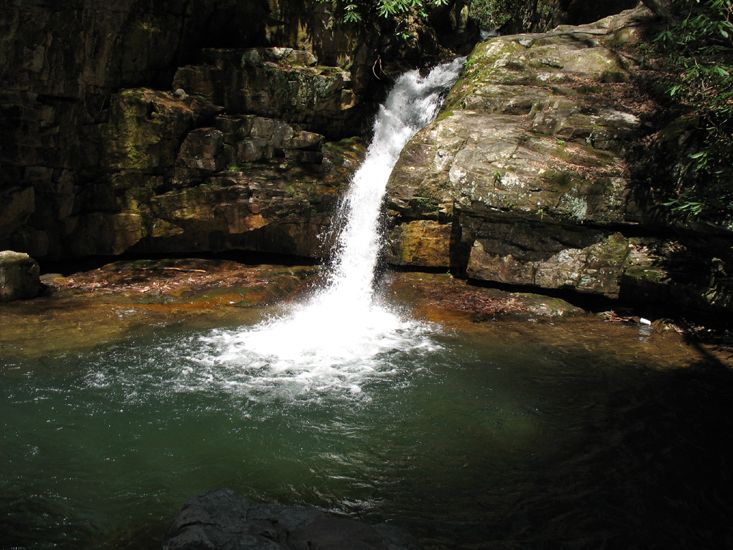
The main waterfall at Blue Hole Falls located on Holston Mountain in Carter County, TN.

Panhandle Road is located off State Highway 91 in Carter County and ascends Holston Mountain for three miles (4.8 km) from the eastern side and ends four miles (6.4 km) along the ridge southwest of Holston High Point. During periods of heavy snow and ice, hunting season, or nesting season, the Tennessee Wildlife Resources Agency closes off Panhandle Road with an iron gate. Located near the Cherokee National Forest boundary and to the left of Panhandle Road is a parking area and foot trail that leads down the slope to the Blue Hole Falls (approximately 45 feet (14 m) high). The iron gate referred to above is there, owned and maintained by the Cherokee National Forest, Watauga Ranger District. No matter, though.. the last three miles (4.8 km) of Panhandle Road along the top of the ridge are filled with washouts, steep drop-offs, and no turnarounds. Vehicle travel on those last three miles (4.8 km) is at the driver's risk.

U.S. Route 421 crosses Holston Mountain at Low Gap, connecting the community of Shady Valley, Tennessee, with the city of Bristol, Tennessee.

== History ==
Holston Mountain is named after the Holston River, which is named for Stephen Holston, a descendant of a Swede of New Sweden. Stephen Holston moved west and in 1746 built a cabin near the headwaters of a little creek. When surveyors were working in the area the next year they gave the creek the name "Holston's Creek", because Stephen Holston lived on it. Later pioneers followed the creek downstream where, after receiving many tributaries, it was wide enough to become a river and so it became known as the Holston River. George R. Stewart, describing this placename history, notes, "Thus one of the largest streams of that region came to bear the name of a common settler". Stewart goes on to note that the nearby Clinch River is likewise named for a "common settler". Unlike Holston, the identity of Clinch is unknown, except that Dr. Walker wrote of a stream called "Clinch's River from one Clinch, a hunter".

October 4, 1976 Kingsport, Tennessee Daily News staff writer, Mark Aldeen, in an article entitled "Investigation Into Cause Of Plane Crash Continues", reported the crash landing of a USAF reconnaissance plane on Holston Mountain, 13.2 miles from the Tri-cites airport. The RF-4C "Phantom" carried two Airmen, neither of whom survived.

September 1, 2007 The FAA says five Jehovah's Witnesses ministers from East Tennessee were killed when their small plane crashed in the Cherokee National Forest on Holston Mountain shortly after takeoff. A passing airplane spotted the smoldering wreckage around 7:00 p.m. Saturday about a mile and a half down the southern side of the mountain, from the Holston High Point broadcasting antenna farm.

== Trails ==
The Appalachian Trail crosses over from Iron Mountain from the southeast side, then runs along the upper northeast end of Holston Mountain. The trail descends on the northeast end, sloping down the mountain into Virginia, the town of Damascus, and continues to Mount Rogers, the highest point in Virginia.

== Communications hub ==
Early broadcasters in the 1950s and 1960s quickly realized Holston Mountain as a prime radio-television transmission location because it is the highest visible point that faces most of the major cities in Upper East Tennessee and Southwest Virginia in the surrounding valley between Knoxville, Tennessee, to southwest of Roanoke, Virginia. As a result, the Holston Mountain ridge is the transmitting site for five television stations in the Tri-Cities, Tennessee Television Designated Market Area (DMA). The digital broadcasting antenna for WCYB, digital Channel 5, Bristol, Virginia is on Rye Patch Knob, with the top of the antenna 341 feet (104 m) above ground, 2,431 feet (741 m) above the surrounding valley floor, and 4,533 feet (1,382 m) above mean sea level. The single tower that antenna sits on, is the highest and tallest man-made structure on the mountain, allowing the Virginia station to transmit from the highest broadcasting point in Tennessee, Virginia and Kentucky. The television towers for WJHL, digital Channel 11, Johnson City, Tennessee, and WKPT, digital Channel 19, Kingsport, Tennessee, are standing side by side in a common broadcasting antenna farm on the southwest slope of Holston High Point, one mile (1.6 km) southwest of Rye Patch Knob. The antenna for WJHL stands 200 feet (61 m) above ground, 2,319 feet (707 m) above the surrounding valley floor, and 4,370 feet (1,330 m) above mean sea level. The antenna for WKPT next door stands 193 feet (59 m) above ground, also 2,319 feet (707 m) above the valley floor, and 4,366 feet (1,331 m) above mean sea level.

The transmitter for WEMT, digital Channel 39, licensed to Greeneville, Tennessee was relocated from Camp Creek Bald (Viking Mountain) south of Greeneville to the WCYB digital tower on Rye Patch Knob, when ownership of WEMT was acquired by the Sinclair Broadcast Group, owners of WCYB.

Holston Mountain is also the transmitting site for three FM Class C radio stations: WTFM-FM 98.5, Kingsport, Tennessee; WXBQ-FM 96.9, Bristol, Virginia and WETS-FM 89.5, Johnson City, Tennessee. All three antennas and the backup antennas are located at the antenna farm on the southwest slope of Holston High Point. Also located on the ridge are the antenna for one FM Class C1 radio station, WHCB-FM 91.5, Bristol, Tennessee, located at Rye Patch Knob; one FM Class C2 antenna for radio station WCQR-FM 88.3, Kingsport, Tennessee, and one FM Class D antenna for radio station W214AP-FM 90.7, Johnson City, Tennessee, both transmitting from the antenna farm on the southwest slope of Holston High Point. Located further down the southwestern slope, off of Holston Mountain Road, is the transmitting site of FM Class C3 WEXX 99.3, Elizabethton, Tennessee. Various U.S. federal, Tennessee state, Sullivan, Washington and Carter County governmental agencies, along with utility microwave relay stations, also transmit base-to-mobile communications from the Holston High Point antenna farm and Rye Patch Knob.

Holston Mountain is also home to several amateur radios transmitter sites. wm4t repeater site sits on the highest peak of the mountain for two-way radio service. This site covers seven states in communications. The tower (shown below) is 120 feet self-supporting. It tops out with an antenna on top of 18 more feet.

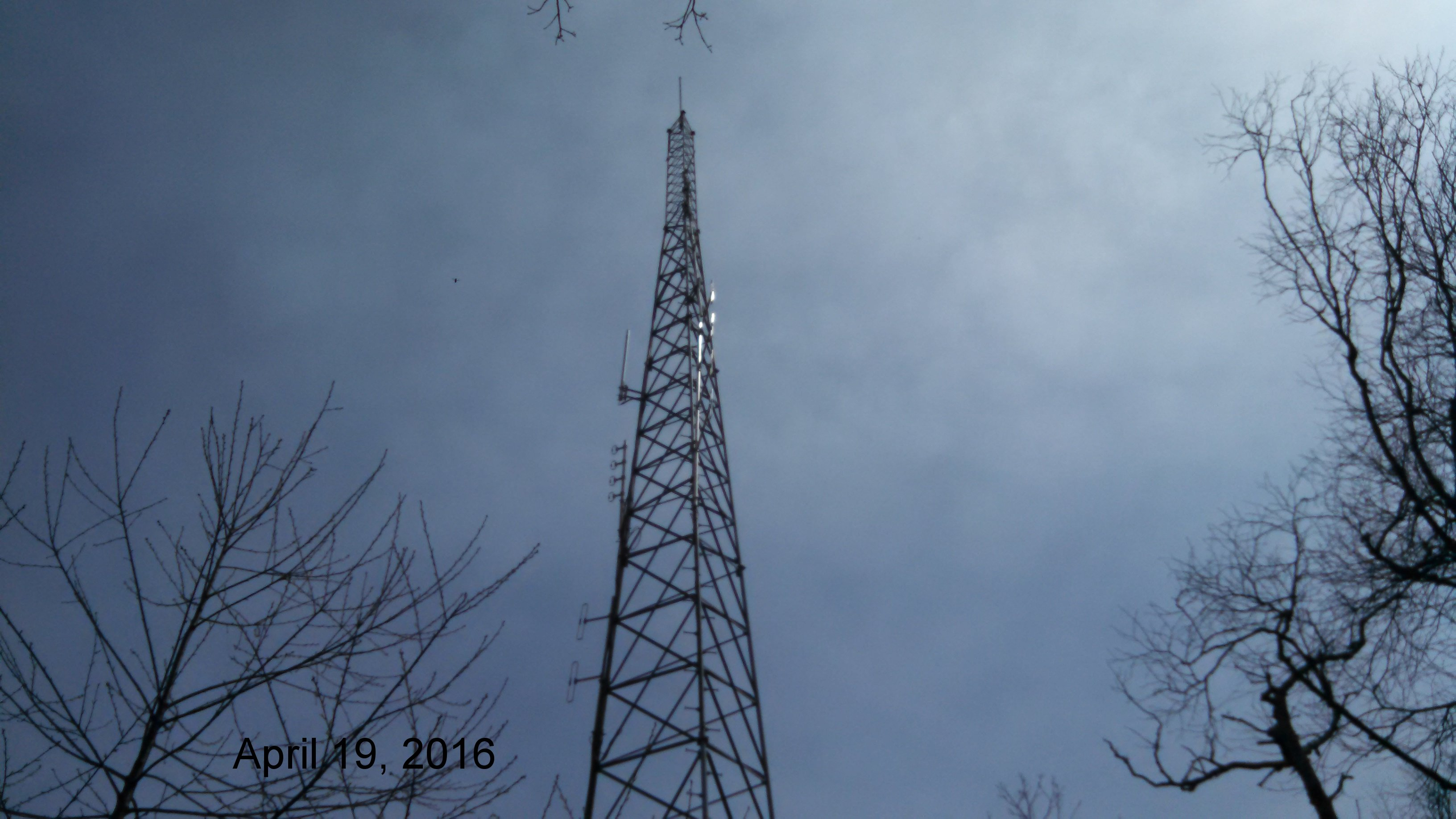

== Antenna farms ==
The Holston Mountain collection of broadcast towers, commonly referred to as an "antenna farm" is a good example of radio and TV station owners, co-locating their broadcast towers near each other on the highest point near their FCC city of license. This marketing practice was borne during the 1950s, before cable and during a time when all homes had outside antennae to receive broadcast signals. When the viewer wanted to receive a clear picture or FM stereo from their favorite station, they would point their antennae toward that radio or TV station's broadcasting tower (usually on the highest mountain peak nearby). Other station owners realized the benefit of locating their transmitting towers near that one, to allow viewers to get clear signals from their stations, too. The nearest antenna farm to Holston Mountain is southwest to Sharp's Ridge, on which most of the FM and TV stations in the Knoxville, Tennessee Designated Market Area (DMA) have their antennas and towers. The next nearest from Holston Mountain is on Poor Mountain in Central Virginia, home to most of the FM and TV stations in the Roanoke, Virginia Radio and Television DMA. Although most radio and TV stations are in fierce competition with each other in their broadcast markets, they will often locate their broadcasting antennas very near each other, and in some cases, will even share land or towers with each other, in the interests of space, land availability, and the cost of putting a transmission building on top of a mountain.

== See also ==
- Southeast Airlines Flight 308
