= Bitter Truth =

Bitter Truth or similar, may mean:

- The Bitter Truth (film), 1917 film
- The Bitter Truth, 2021 album by Evanescence
- A Bitter Truth, 2011 novel by Caroline and Charles Todd
- "Bitter Truth", 2013 song by Hatebreed from The Divinity of Purpose
- "Bitter Truth", 1991 song by St Vitus from Heavier Than Thou
- "Bitter Truth", 1980 song by female post-punk band Mo-dettes
- "Bitter Truth", 2017 song by singer Iron & Wine from Beast Epic
- "Verdad amarga" (a.k.a. "Bitter Truth"), 1947 song by Consuelo Velázquez
- The Bitters Truth (also 'The Bitter Truth'), a brand of bitters from Boker's Bitters

== See also ==
- Sugar: The Bitter Truth, a 2009 medical lecture by Robert Lustig
- "Truth, Bitter Truth", 2004 episode of One Tree Hill; see List of One Tree Hill episodes
- Bitter (disambiguation)
- Truth (disambiguation)
