= Laurel Fork, Tennessee =

- Unincorporated community
- Location within Tennessee Location within the United States
- Coordinates: 36°12′21″N 82°00′09″W
- Country: United States
- State: Tennessee
- County: Carter
- Elevation: 3,455 ft (1,053 m)
- Time zone: UTC-5 (Eastern (EST))
  - Summer (DST): UTC-4 (EDT)
- Area code: 423
- GNIS feature ID: 1315358

Laurel Fork is an unincorporated community in Carter County, Tennessee, United States.
