= Bitter end =

Bitter end or The Bitter End may refer to:

- Bitter end, the end of a rope that is tied off with a knot
- The Bitter End, a nightclub in New York City

== Arts, entertainment and media ==
=== Literature ===
- Bitter End (novella), a 1940 Nero Wolfe mystery by Rex Stout
- "The Bitter End" (short story), by Randall Garrett

=== Music ===
- The Bitter End (Right Away, Great Captain album), 2006
- The Bitter End, a 2002 album by Red Flag
- "Bitter End", a song by Nine Black Alps from the 2007 album Love/Hate
- "Bitter End", a 2015 song by Rag'n'Bone Man
- "A Bitter End", a 1998 song by Deryl Dodd
- "The Bitter End" (song), by Placebo, 2003
- "The Bitter End", a song by Stone Sour from the 2010 album Audio Secrecy
- "The Bitter End", a song by Sum 41 from the 2004 album Chuck
- "The Bitter End", a song by Xentrix from the 2002 album For Whose Advantage?

=== Television ===
- "Bitter End", a 2002 episode of Pole to Pole with Michael Palin
- "The Bitter End", a 2013 episode of Blue Bloods season 3

== Places ==
- Bitter End, Tennessee, United States
- Bitter End, Virgin Gorda, British Virgin Islands

== See also ==
- "Bitters End", a song by Roxy Music from the 1972 album Roxy Music
- To the Bitter End (Bis zum bitteren Ende), the first-hand account of the German resistance by Hans Bernd Gisevius
