= Big Spring, Carter County, Tennessee =

Big Spring, Tennessee
- Unincorporated community
- Location within Tennessee Location within the United States
- Coordinates: 36°19′01″N 82°14′33″W
- Country: United States
- State: Tennessee
- County: Carter
- Elevation: 1,578 ft (481 m)
- Time zone: UTC-5 (Eastern (EST))
  - Summer (DST): UTC-4 (EDT)
- Area code: 423
- GNIS feature ID: 1277393

Big Spring is an unincorporated community in Carter County, Tennessee, United States.
