= Turtle-at-Home =

Native American warrior and leader

Turtle-at-Home, or Selukuki Wohelengh, was a Cherokee warrior and leader, brother and chief lieutenant of Dragging Canoe, a war-chief in the Cherokee–American wars.

== Early battles ==
In the beginning and the later years, he led Chickamauga Cherokee war parties against the overmountain settlements on the Holston, Nolichucky, Watauga, and Doe Rivers in modern East Tennessee; and against the Cumberland River settlements near Fort Nashborough in modern Middle Tennessee.

== Later battles ==
After the second destruction of the Chickamauga Towns in 1782, instead of moving to the Five Lower Towns with his brother and the rest of the Chickamauga/Lower Cherokee, he and his band of about seventy warriors headed north into the "Kentucke territory," to fight alongside their Shawnee allies.

=== Northwest Indian War ===
Turtle-at-Home and his band remained in the north until after the 1791 Battle of the Wabash (during the Northwest Indian War), in which he and his warriors—along with two parties brought north separately by his brothers, "Little Owl" and "The Badger"—participated. In that battle, the combined forces of the Shawnee leader, Blue Jacket, and the Miami leader, Little Turtle, delivered the single worst defeat ever inflicted upon the United States military by American Indians. Only 48 of Arthur St. Clair's 1000 troops escaping harm, 623 of those 1000 killed outright.

After that battle, Turtle-at-Home returned south with his two brothers; although his men stayed behind. In 1792, he and The Glass had just returned from a successful raid on the Cumberland River settlements and Kentucky when his older brother returned from his embassies to the other Southeastern tribes, successful with the Choctaw and Lower Muscogee (the Upper Muscogee had been allies for years); though unsuccessful with the Chickasaw. After an all-night celebration at Lookout Mountain Town (now Trenton, Georgia), Dragging Canoe died. John Watts succeeded him.

== Peacetime ==
When the wars ended, Turtle-at-Home rose to become one of the central leaders of the Lower Cherokee and of The nation as a whole. He was always on the council of the Lower Towns and succeeded as Speaker of the National Council upon the death of Doublehead. Residing at Nickajack, he operated a ferry across the Tennessee River that served travelers on the branch of the Federal Road that ran from Augusta, Georgia to Nashville, Tennessee. He was also headman of Nickajack, which after the wars almost totally eclipsed its neighbor, Running Water, becoming so large it straddled the river.

Politically, he was part of the dominant group in the Lower Towns which favored emigration west across the Mississippi River, a position for which at one point he was expelled from the national council along with several other Lower Cherokee leaders.

When John Norton, the Mohawk leader of Cherokee-Scottish ancestry, traveled south and stayed in the area during his travels after the War of 1812, Turtle-at-Home served as his main informant for the history of the area.

== Sources ==
- Brown, John P. Old Frontiers: The Story of the Cherokee Indians from Earliest Times to the Date of Their Removal to the West, 1838. (Kingsport: Southern Publishers, 1938).
- Evans, E. Raymond. "Notable Persons in Cherokee History: Dragging Canoe". Journal of Cherokee Studies, Vol. 2, No. 2, pp. 176–189. (Cherokee: Museum of the Cherokee Indian, 1977).
- Haywood, W.H. The Civil and Political History of the State of Tennessee from its Earliest Settlement up to the Year 1796. (Nashville: Methodist Episcopal Publishing House, 1891).
- Klink, Karl, and James Talman, ed. The Journal of Major John Norton. (Toronto: Champlain Society, 1970).
- McLoughlin, William G. Cherokee Renascence in the New Republic. (Princeton: Princeton University Press, 1992).
- Moore, John Trotwood and Austin P. Foster. Tennessee, The Volunteer State, 1769-1923, Vol. 1. (Chicago: S. J. Clarke Publishing Co., 1923).
- Ramsey, James Gettys McGready. The Annals of Tennessee to the End of the Eighteenth Century. (Chattanooga: Judge David Campbell, 1926).
