= Bitter (surname) =

The surnames Bitter, de Bitter or Von Bitter may refer to:

- Billy Bitter (born 1988), an American lacrosse player
- Francis Bitter (1902–1967), an American physicist who invented the Bitter electromagnet, which uses circular metal plates instead of wire coils
- Friedrich August Georg Bitter (1873–1927), a German botanist and lichenologist
- Johannes Bitter (born 1982), a German team handball player
- Karl Bitter (1867–1915), an Austrian-born United States sculptor
- Karl Hermann Bitter (1813–1885), Prussian statesman
- Kees Bitter (1919–1945), Dutch resistance fighter forced to collaborate with the German regime after his capture
- Peter von Bitter (living), a German-born Canadian palaeontologist
- Pieter de Bitter (ca. 1620–1666), a 17th-century Dutch officer of the Dutch East India Company
- Susan Bitter Smith (living), an Arizona Republican politician
- Theo Bitter (1916–1994), a Dutch graphic artist, painter and draftsman.

== See also ==
- Bitter (disambiguation)
