= Southeast Airlines Flight 308 =

1959 aviation accident

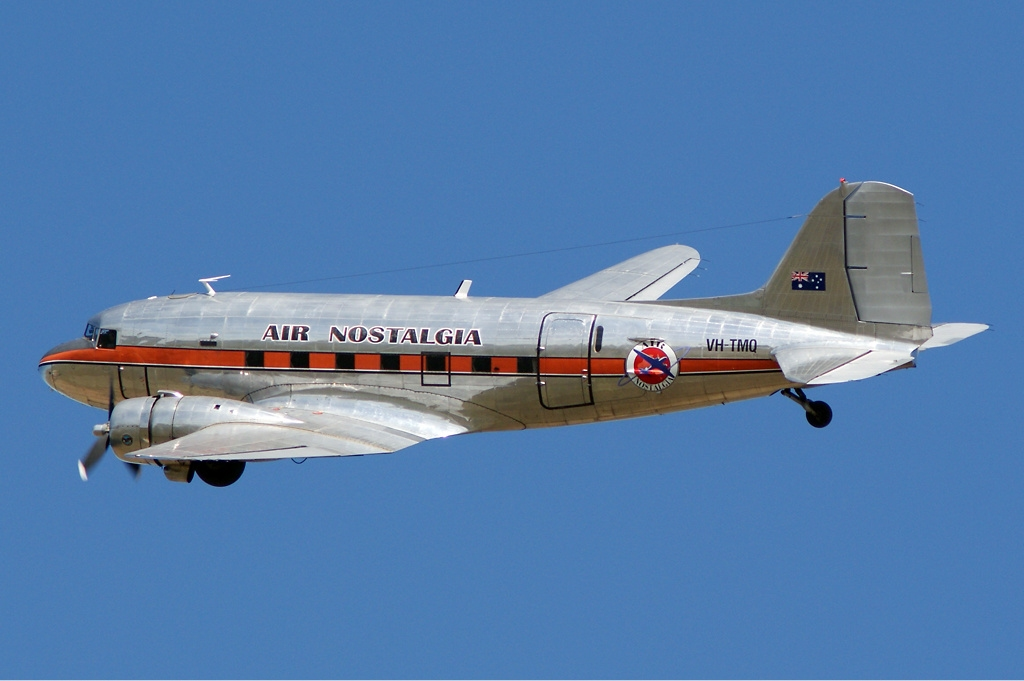
- A DC-3 similar to the accident aircraft

Accident
- Date: January 8, 1959
- Summary: Controlled flight into terrain
- Site: Holston Mountain, Sullivan County, Tennessee, United States; 36.508°N 82.000°W

Aircraft
- Aircraft type: Douglas DC-3A
- Operator: Southeast Airlines
- Registration: N18941
- Flight origin: McGhee Tyson Airport, Knoxville, Tennessee, United States
- Destination: Tri-Cities Regional Airport, Bristol, Tennessee, United States
- Occupants: 10
- Passengers: 7
- Crew: 3
- Fatalities: 10
- Survivors: 0

Southeast Airlines Flight 308 was an American domestic flight operated by Southeast Airlines between Knoxville and Bristol, Tennessee, in the United States. On January 8, 1959, it was flown by a Douglas DC-3A registered N18941. On approach to Tri-Cities Regional Airport at Bristol, the aircraft crashed into the Holston Mountain range with the loss of all on board.

== Accident ==
The aircraft departed McGhee Tyson Airport outside of Knoxville 27 minutes late on what was the second leg of the flight with seven passengers and three crew. The DC-3A was cleared for an approach to runway 27 at Tri-Cities Regional Airport. The visibility at the airport was 3 miles (4.8 km) in light snow and fog with a 900-foot (274 m) broken ceiling and overcast at 1,700 feet (518 m). The crew reported problems with the automatic direction finder and they were unable to find the outer marker visually or aurally. The aircraft passed to the east of the outer marker and while outside the normal procedure turn area descended and hit the wooded slope on the north-west side of the Holston Mountain range, killing all 10 people on board.

== Probable cause ==
Following an investigation of the accident, the investigation board reported, "The Board determines the probable cause of this accident was the failure of the pilot to identify Gray intersection properly and his decision to continue an ILS (instrument landing system) approach contrary to company and regulatory procedures".
