= USS Bittern =

USS Bittern may refer to the following ships of the United States Navy:

- USS Bittern (AM-36) was launched 15 February 1919 by Alabama Dry Dock and Shipbuilding Co., Mobile, Alabama.
- USS Bittern (AM-352) was laid down on 10 September 1943 at Portland, Oregon, by the Willamette Iron and Steel Corp.; named Bittern on 11 April 1944; and launched on 21 June 1944. The cessation of hostilities, however, prompted the Navy to cancel the contract for her construction on 1 November 1945.
- USS Bittern (MHC-43) was launched 4 March 1957 by Consolidated Shipbuilding Corp., City Island, New York
