= Carter County, Tennessee =

County in Tennessee, United States

- County
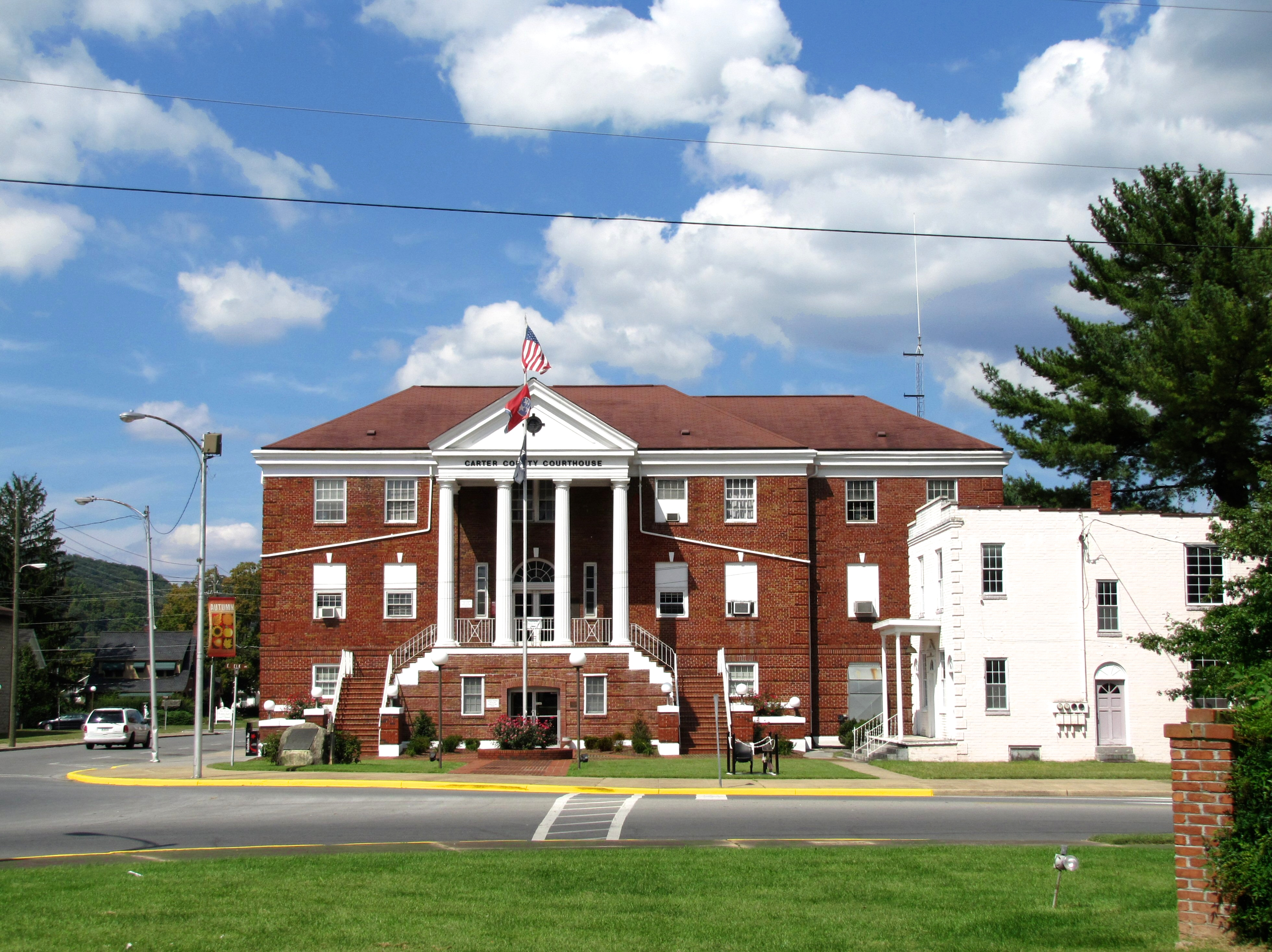
- Carter County Courthouse in Elizabethton

- Flag Seal

- Location within the U.S. state of Tennessee
- Coordinates: 36°18′N 82°07′W
- Country: United States
- State: Tennessee
- Founded: 1796
- Named for: Landon Carter
- Seat: Elizabethton
- Largest city: Elizabethton

Area
  - Total: 348 sq mi (900 km^{2})
  - Land: 341 sq mi (880 km^{2})
  - Water: 6.4 sq mi (17 km^{2}) 1.8%

Population (2020)
  - Total: 56,356
  - Estimate (2025): 57,361 ▲
  - Density: 165/sq mi (63.8/km^{2})
- Time zone: UTC−5 (Eastern)
  - Summer (DST): UTC−4 (EDT)
- Congressional district: 1st
- Website: www.cartercountytn.gov

Carter County is a county located in the U.S. state of Tennessee. As of the 2020 census, the population was 56,356. Its county seat is Elizabethton. The county is named in honor of Landon Carter, an early settler active in the "Lost State of Franklin" 1784–1788 secession from the State of North Carolina. Carter County is part of the Johnson City metropolitan area, which is a component of the Johnson City–Kingsport–Bristol Combined Statistical Area, located in northeastern Tennessee.

== History ==
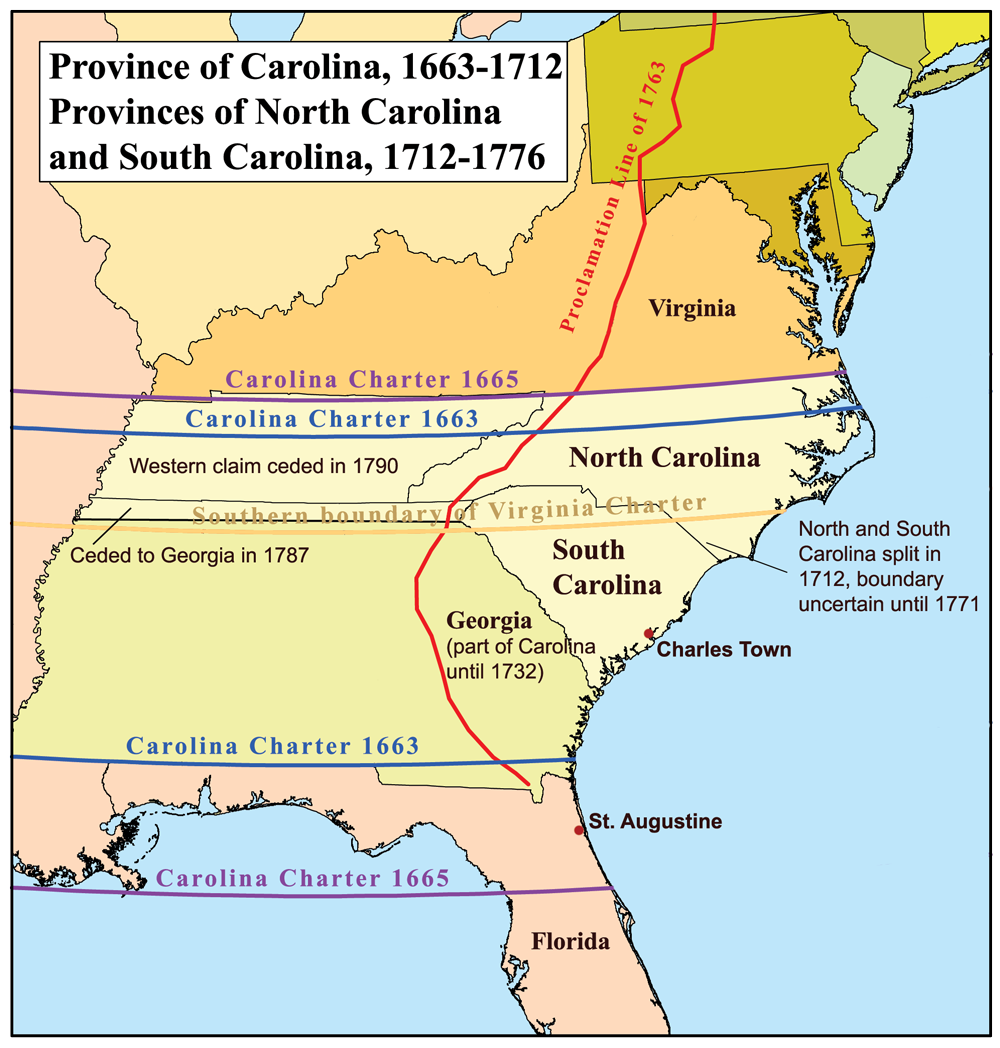
A map of the Province of Carolina

The area was originally claimed by Britain as part of the Clarendon settlements of the Province of Carolina, although actually populated at the time by the Cherokee.

The area was part of (though seldom actually administered by) the following jurisdictions in its early history:

- New Hanover Precinct (1729–1734)
- Bladen County (1734–1749)
- Anson County (1749–1753)
- Rowan County (1753–1775)

=== Watauga Association ===
The county is named for General Landon Carter, the son of John Carter of Virginia, who was "chairman of the court" of the first majority-rule system of American democracy, known as the Watauga Association of 1772. The association was the first permanent settlement established outside the original thirteen American colonies and included the area that is today's Carter County. In 1775, the Association was absorbed into North Carolina by petition, becoming known thereafter as the Washington District.

=== As Wayne County in the State of Franklin ===
J. G. M. Ramsey records within his 1853 Annals of Tennessee that the State of Franklin established Wayne County from sections of both Washington County and a part of Wilkes County "lying west of the extreme heights of the Apalachian or Alleghany Mountains, into a separate and distinct county by the name of Wayne... This new county covered the same territory now embraced in the limits of Carter and Johnson counties."

The county seat, Elizabethton, is named for Carter's wife, Elizabeth MacLin Carter.

=== Civil War ===
Like most East Tennessee counties, Carter Countians opposed secession on the eve of the Civil War. In Tennessee's Ordinance of Secession referendum on June 8, 1861, Carter Countians rejected secession by a vote of 1,343 to 86. A railroad bridge at Carter's Depot (modern Watauga) was among those targeted by the East Tennessee bridge-burning conspiracy in November 1861.

=== Early railroad ===
Carter County was served by the narrow gauge East Tennessee and Western North Carolina Railroad (The ET&WNC, nicknamed "Tweetsie") until the line ceased operations in 1950.

== Geography ==
According to the U.S. Census Bureau, the county has a total area of 348 square miles (900 km^{2}), of which 341 square miles (880 km^{2}) is land and 6.4 square miles (17 km^{2}) (1.8%) is water.

Carter County is situated entirely within the Blue Ridge Mountains, specifically the Unaka Range and the Iron Mountains. Roan Mountain, which at 6,285 feet (1,916 m) is the highest point in Tennessee outside the Great Smoky Mountains, straddles the county's eastern border with North Carolina. The county's boundary with Sullivan County is defined as the ridgeline of Holston Mountain.

=== Lakes ===
- Watauga Lake
- Wilbur Reservoir (immediately below the TVA Watauga Dam Lat: 36.3408 Lon: −82.1203]
- Ripshin Lake (6 km southwest of Roan Mountain Lat: 36.1838646 Lon: −82.1356583)

=== Rivers ===
- Watauga River
- Doe River

=== Waterfalls ===
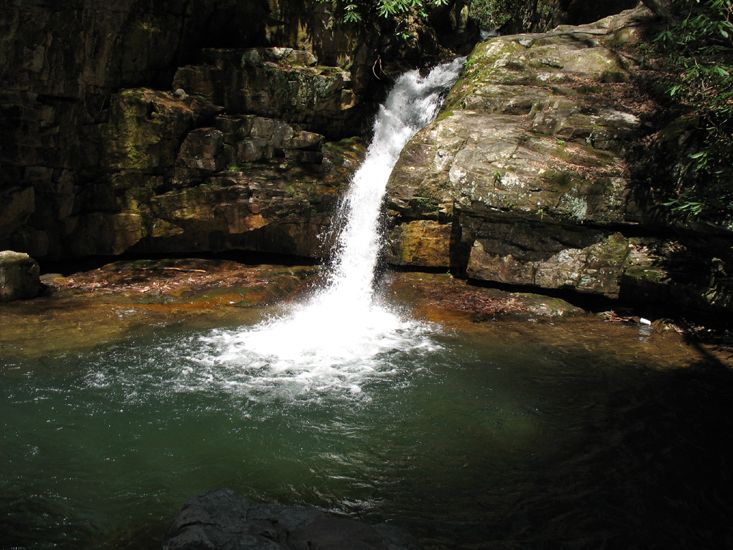
The main waterfall at Blue Hole Falls, located northeast of Elizabethton on Holston Mountain.

- CTF015 Big Laurel Br. Falls 50'
  lake
- CTF001 Blue Hole Falls (4) 45'
  Cherokee National Forest
- CTF018 Hardcore Cascades 12'
  Cherokee National Forest
- CTF002 Coon Den Falls 50'
  Cherokee National Forest
- CTF003 Dennis Cove Falls 25'
  wilderness
- CTF005 Firescald Branch Falls
  wilderness
- CTF016 Five Eights
  lake
- CTF006 Jones Falls 100'
  Cherokee National Forest
- CTF007 Laurel Falls 55'
  wilderness
- CTF010 Laurel Falls (m) 25'
  wilderness
- CTF011 Laurel Falls (u) 25'
  wilderness
- CTF014 Mountaineer Falls 20'
  Cherokee National Forest
- CTF012 North Fork Stony Creek Falls 30'
  Cherokee National Forest
- CTF008 Sally Cove Creek Falls 25'
- CTF009 Twisting Falls 30'
  Cherokee National Forest
- CTF013 Splash Dam Falls 25'
  Cherokee National Forest
- CTF017 Hays Branch Falls 18'
  Cherokee National Forest

=== Adjacent counties ===
- Sullivan County (north)
- Johnson County (northeast)
- Avery County, North Carolina (southeast)
- Mitchell County, North Carolina (south)
- Unicoi County (southwest)
- Washington County (west)

=== National protected areas ===
- Appalachian Trail (part)
- Cherokee National Forest (part)

=== State protected areas ===
- Sycamore Shoals State Historic Area
- Roan Mountain State Park
- Sabine Hill State Historic Site
- Hampton Creek Cove State Natural Area
- Watauga River Bluffs State Natural Area

=== Major highways ===
- US 19E
- US 321
- SR 37
- SR 67
- SR 91
- SR 143
- SR 159
- SR 173
- SR 359
- SR 361
- SR 362
- SR 400

== Law enforcement ==
Carter County is served by the Carter County Sheriff's Office, located in Elizabethton. During the Local General Election on August 4, 2022, Mike Fraley overcame the Independent candidate to become Sheriff of Carter County. Sheriff Fraley took over Official Duties as Sheriff on September 1. Sheriff Fraley's term will run September 1, 2022, to August 31, 2026. Its duties include patrol of the county and all jail and prisoner matters.

The Elizabethton Police Department services the City of Elizabethton inside Carter County. As of 2018, the Chief of Police is Jason Shaw.

== Climate ==
Climate data for Carter County, Tennessee (Bristol–Johnson City)
Month	Jan	Feb	Mar	Apr	May	Jun	Jul	Aug	Sep	Oct	Nov	Dec	Year
Mean daily maximum °F (°C)	43.7 (6.5)	48.0 (8.9)	58.9 (14.9)	67.4 (19.7)	75.2 (24.0)	82.2 (27.9)	84.6 (29.2)	84.1 (28.9)	79.1 (26.2)	69.1 (20.6)	58.2 (14.6)	48.1 (8.9)	66.6 (19.2)
Daily mean °F (°C)	34.0 (1.1)	37.4 (3.0)	47.2 (8.4)	55.2 (12.9)	63.4 (17.4)	71.1 (21.7)	74.4 (23.6)	73.6 (23.1)	67.9 (19.9)	56.7 (13.7)	47.0 (8.3)	38.2 (3.4)	55.5 (13.1)
Mean daily minimum °F (°C)	24.3 (−4.3)	26.8 (−2.9)	35.4 (1.9)	43.0 (6.1)	51.6 (10.9)	59.9 (15.5)	64.1 (17.8)	63.1 (17.3)	56.6 (13.7)	44.2 (6.8)	35.9 (2.2)	28.2 (−2.1)	44.4 (6.9)
Average rainfall inches (mm)	3.2 (81)	3.4 (86)	3.7 (94)	3.3 (84)	3.8 (97)	3.5 (89)	4.3 (110)	3.2 (81)	3.3 (84)	2.6 (66)	2.9 (74)	3.4 (86)	40.7 (1,030)
Average snowfall inches (cm)	5.2 (13)	4.2 (11)	2.3 (5.8)	0.4 (1.0)	0.0 (0.0)	0.0 (0.0)	0.0 (0.0)	0.0 (0.0)	0.0 (0.0)	0.0 (0.0)	0.9 (2.3)	2.6 (6.6)	15.6 (40)
Average relative humidity (%)	59.0	71.5	69.0	67.0	69.5	73.0	75.0	76.5	76.5	74.0	68.5	69.5	74.0
Source: Climate-zone.com

== Demographics ==
Historical population
Census	Pop.	Note	%±
1800	4,813		—
1810	4,190		−12.9%
1820	4,835		15.4%
1830	6,414		32.7%
1840	5,372		−16.2%
1850	6,296		17.2%
1860	7,124		13.2%
1870	7,909		11.0%
1880	10,019		26.7%
1890	13,389		33.6%
1900	16,688		24.6%
1910	19,838		18.9%
1920	21,488		8.3%
1930	29,223		36.0%
1940	35,127		20.2%
1950	42,432		20.8%
1960	41,578		−2.0%
1970	42,575		2.4%
1980	50,205		17.9%
1990	51,505		2.6%
2000	56,742		10.2%
2010	57,424		1.2%
2020	56,356		−1.9%
2025 (est.)	57,361	▲	1.8%
U.S. Decennial Census; 1790-1960 1900-1990; 1990-2000 2010-2014

=== Racial and ethnic composition ===
Carter County, Tennessee – Racial and ethnic composition Note: the US Census treats Hispanic/Latino as an ethnic category. This table excludes Latinos from the racial categories and assigns them to a separate category. Hispanics/Latinos may be of any race.
Race / ethnicity (NH = Non-Hispanic)	Pop 1980	Pop 1990	Pop 2000	Pop 2010	Pop 2020	% 1980	% 1990	% 2000	% 2010	% 2020
White alone (NH)	49,445	50,637	54,996	54,849	51,790	98.49%	98.31%	96.92%	95.52%	91.90%
Black or African American alone (NH)	423	455	558	743	702	0.84%	0.88%	0.98%	1.29%	1.25%
Native American or Alaska Native alone (NH)	43	91	107	110	153	0.09%	0.18%	0.19%	0.19%	0.27%
Asian alone (NH)	52	125	145	180	231	0.10%	0.24%	0.26%	0.31%	0.41%
Native Hawaiian or Pacific Islander alone (NH)	x	x	4	8	7	x	x	0.01%	0.01%	0.01%
Other race alone (NH)	22	6	15	49	108	0.04%	0.01%	0.03%	0.09%	0.19%
Mixed race or Multiracial (NH)	x	x	413	595	2,184	x	x	0.73%	1.04%	3.88%
Hispanic or Latino (any race)	220	191	504	890	1,181	0.44%	0.37%	0.89%	1.55%	2.10%
Total	50,205	51,505	56,742	57,424	56,356	100.00%	100.00%	100.00%	100.00%	100.00%

=== 2020 census ===
As of the 2020 census, there were 56,356 people, 24,317 households, and 15,256 families residing in the county.

The median age was 45.5 years, with 18.6% of residents younger than 18 and 22.2% aged 65 or older. For every 100 females there were 95.3 males, and among adults 18 and over there were 93.8 males for every 100 females.

The racial makeup of the county was 92.6% White, 1.3% Black or African American, 0.3% American Indian and Alaska Native, 0.4% Asian, <0.1% Native Hawaiian and Pacific Islander, 0.8% from some other race, and 4.6% from two or more races. Hispanic or Latino residents of any race comprised 2.1% of the population.

59.3% of residents lived in urban areas, while 40.7% lived in rural areas.

There were 24,317 households in the county, of which 24.6% had children under the age of 18 living in them. Of all households, 44.8% were married-couple households, 20.4% were households with a male householder and no spouse or partner present, and 28.4% were households with a female householder and no spouse or partner present. About 31.7% of all households were made up of individuals and 14.5% had someone living alone who was 65 years of age or older.

There were 27,779 housing units, of which 12.5% were vacant. Among occupied housing units, 69.3% were owner-occupied and 30.7% were renter-occupied. The homeowner vacancy rate was 1.5% and the rental vacancy rate was 6.1%.

=== 2000 census ===
As of the census of 2000, there were 56,742 people, 23,486 households, and 16,346 families residing in the county. The population density was 166 people per square mile (64 people/km^{2}). There were 25,920 housing units at an average density of 76 units per square mile (29/km^{2}). The racial makeup of the county was 97.49% White, 1.00% Black or African American, 0.20% Native American, 0.26% Asian, 0.01% Pacific Islander, 0.27% from other races, and 0.78% from two or more races. 0.89% of the population were Hispanic or Latino of any race.

There were 23,486 households, out of which 28.50% had children under the age of 18 living with them, 54.90% were married couples living together, 11.00% had a female householder with no husband present, and 30.40% were non-families. 26.50% of all households were made up of individuals, and 11.00% had someone living alone who was 65 years of age or older. The average household size was 2.35 and the average family size was 2.83.

In the county, the population was spread out, with 21.40% under the age of 18, 9.20% from 18 to 24, 29.00% from 25 to 44, 25.40% from 45 to 64, and 15.00% who were 65 years of age or older. The median age was 38 years. For every 100 females, there were 94.50 males. For every 100 females age 18 and over, there were 91.60 males.

The median income for a household in the county was $27,371, and the median income for a family was $33,825. Males had a median income of $26,394 versus $19,687 for females. The per capita income for the county was $14,678. About 12.80% of families and 16.90% of the population were below the poverty line, including 23.00% of those under age 18 and 16.00% of those age 65 or over.

== Education ==
Most of the county is in the Carter County School District, while portions in the Elizabethton city limits are in the Elizabethton City School District.

Schools include:

- Central Elementary School
- Cloudland Elementary School
- Cloudland High School
- East Side Elementary School (city)
- Elizabethton High School (city)
- Hampton Elementary School
- Hampton High School
- Happy Valley Elementary School
- Happy Valley Middle School
- Happy Valley High School
- Harold McCormick Elementary School (city)
- Hunter Elementary School
- Keenburg Elementary School
- Little Milligan Elementary School
- T.A. Dugger Junior High School (city)
- Unaka Elementary School
- Unaka High School
- Valley Forge Elementary
- West Side Elementary School (city)

=== Colleges ===
- Northeast State Community College and the Tennessee Colleges of Applied Technology have satellite campuses in Elizabethton.
- Milligan College's main campus and Emmanuel Christian Seminary are located in the community of Milligan College, part of Elizabethton.

== Communities ==
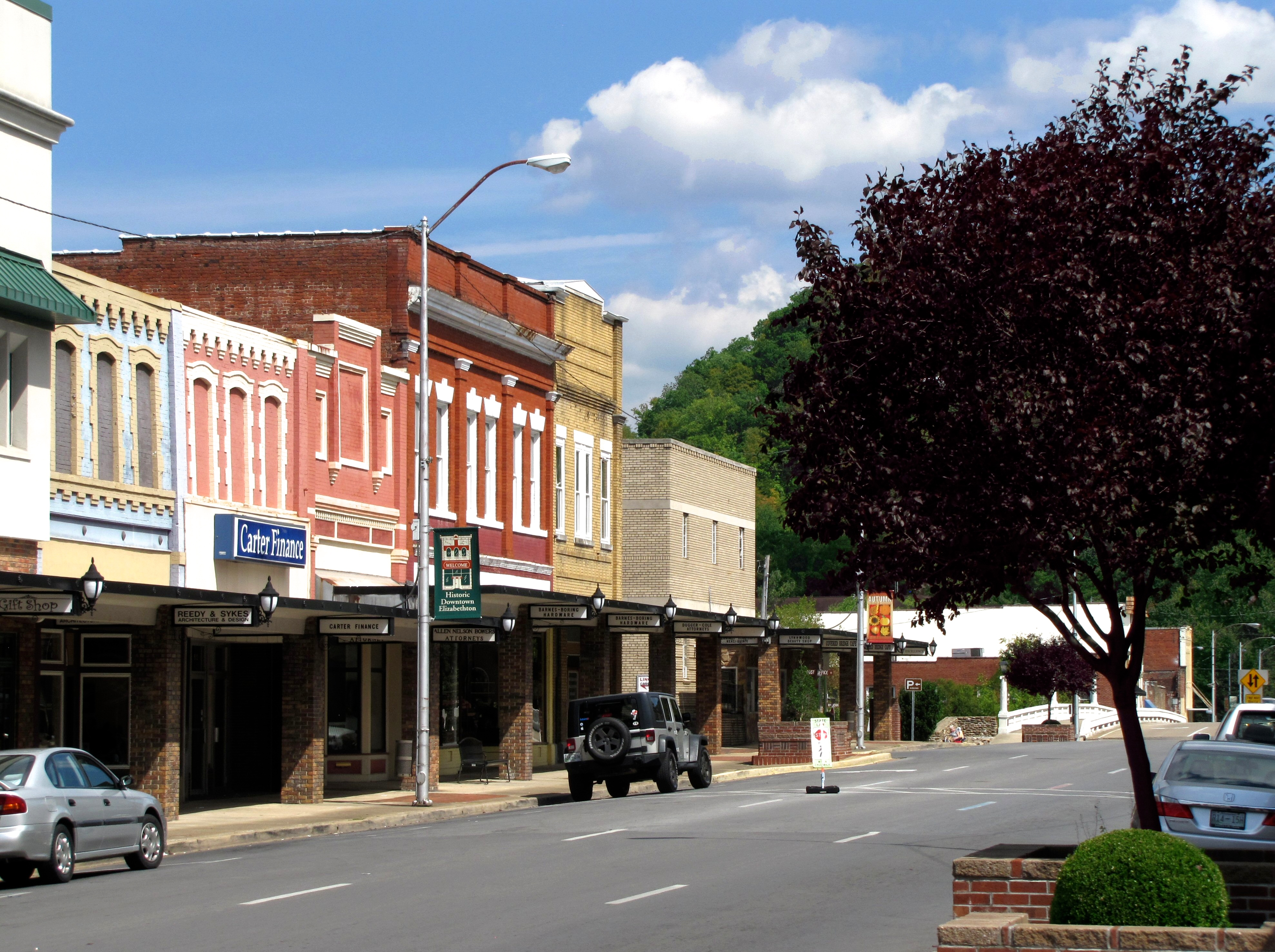
Elk Avenue in Elizabethton

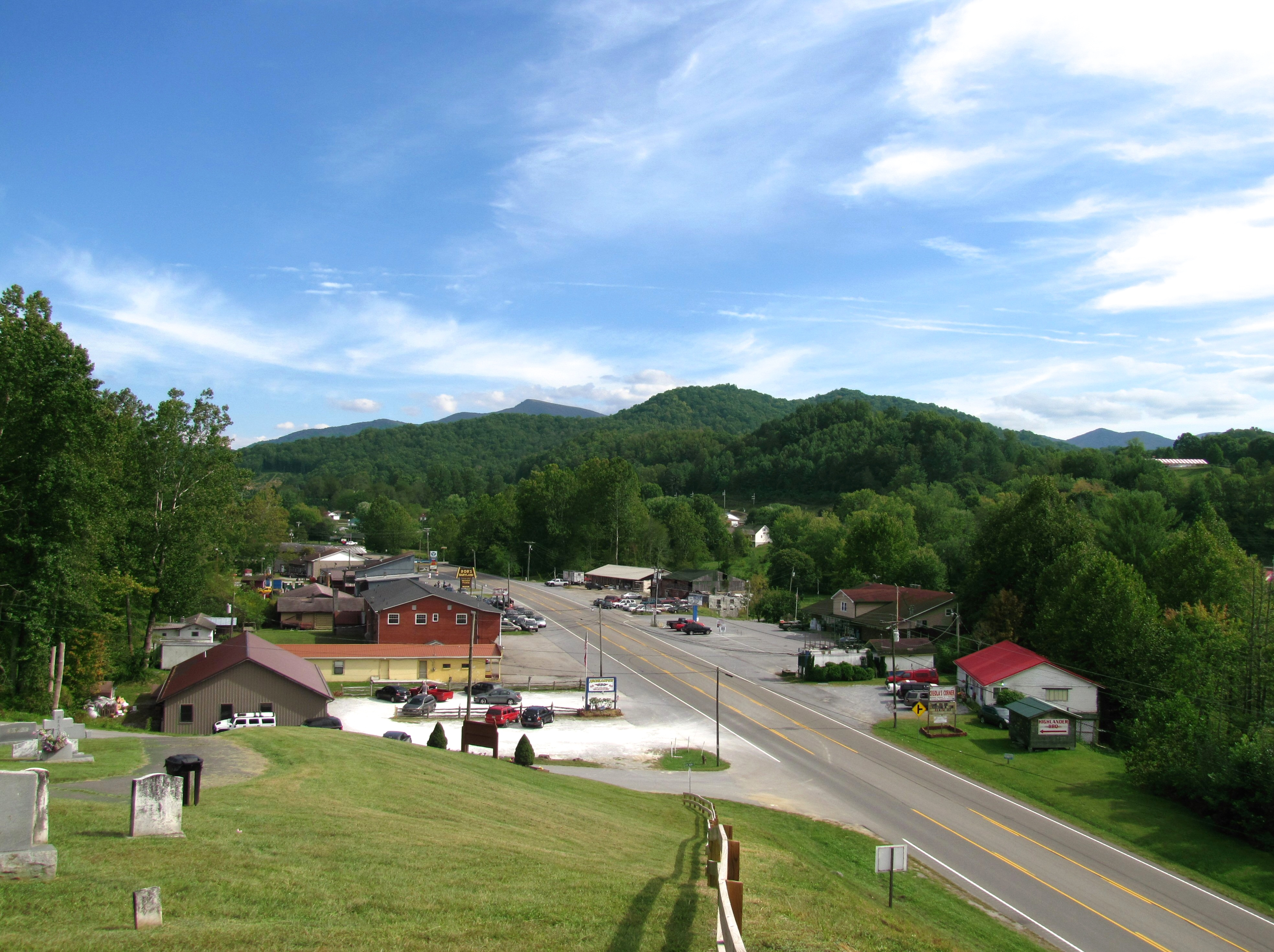
U.S. 19E in Roan Mountain

=== Cities ===
- Elizabethton (county seat)
- Johnson City (mostly in Washington County and a small portion in Sullivan County)
- Watauga (small part in Washington County)

=== Census-designated places ===
- Biltmore
- Central
- Hampton
- Hunter
- Pine Crest
- Roan Mountain
- Valley Forge

=== Other unincorporated communities ===
- Big Spring
- Bitter End
- Butler
- Carter
- Fish Springs
- Laurel Fork
- Milligan College
- Stoney Creek
- Tiger Valley
- Winner

== Politics ==
Carter County is a Republican stronghold, and, like most of East Tennessee, has voted consistently Republican since the Civil War. Carter County is even more heavily Republican than many other counties in East Tennessee and has not been won by a Democratic presidential candidate since before the Civil War. Since then, only one Democrat, southerner Jimmy Carter in 1976 (who also won several traditionally Republican counties in East Tennessee), has received over 40% of the popular vote.

Most recent Carter County Mayor Rusty Barnett died on September 21, 2020.

United States presidential election results for Carter County, Tennessee
Year	Republican		Democratic		Third party(ies)	
Year	No.	%	No.	%	No.	%
1912	1,243	34.08%	478	13.11%	1,926	52.81%
1916	2,961	85.60%	498	14.40%	0	0.00%
1920	6,059	89.99%	674	10.01%	0	0.00%
1924	3,657	86.33%	551	13.01%	28	0.66%
1928	4,934	90.40%	512	9.38%	12	0.22%
1932	5,055	76.26%	1,574	23.74%	0	0.00%
1936	4,858	72.27%	1,837	27.33%	27	0.40%
1940	4,238	65.40%	2,171	33.50%	71	1.10%
1944	4,873	74.33%	1,662	25.35%	21	0.32%
1948	4,943	70.94%	1,809	25.96%	216	3.10%
1952	9,019	76.15%	2,707	22.86%	118	1.00%
1956	11,218	78.80%	2,933	20.60%	85	0.60%
1960	12,214	77.31%	3,412	21.60%	172	1.09%
1964	8,472	61.40%	5,326	38.60%	0	0.00%
1968	9,467	64.68%	2,160	14.76%	3,009	20.56%
1972	11,102	82.15%	2,191	16.21%	221	1.64%
1976	8,934	54.11%	7,443	45.08%	133	0.81%
1980	11,648	64.44%	6,006	33.22%	423	2.34%
1984	13,153	73.35%	4,642	25.89%	138	0.77%
1988	12,036	71.74%	4,634	27.62%	108	0.64%
1992	10,712	55.82%	6,502	33.88%	1,976	10.30%
1996	10,540	57.65%	6,218	34.01%	1,524	8.34%
2000	12,111	63.40%	6,724	35.20%	267	1.40%
2004	15,768	70.67%	6,395	28.66%	150	0.67%
2008	15,852	72.82%	5,587	25.66%	330	1.52%
2012	15,503	75.20%	4,789	23.23%	325	1.58%
2016	16,898	80.15%	3,453	16.38%	733	3.48%
2020	19,584	79.96%	4,529	18.49%	379	1.55%
2024	20,167	81.15%	4,454	17.92%	231	0.93%

== See also ==
- National Register of Historic Places listings in Carter County, Tennessee
- List of counties in Tennessee
