= Biltmore, Tennessee =

Biltmore
- CDP
- Location within Tennessee Location within the United States
- Coordinates: 36°22′20″N 82°13′31″W
- Country: United States
- State: Tennessee
- County: Carter

Area
  - Total: 2.61 sq mi (6.76 km^{2})
  - Land: 2.57 sq mi (6.65 km^{2})
  - Water: 0.042 sq mi (0.11 km^{2})
- Elevation: 1,620 ft (490 m)

Population (2020)
  - Total: 1,837
  - Density: 715.9/sq mi (276.41/km^{2})
- Time zone: UTC-5 (Eastern (EST))
  - Summer (DST): UTC-4 (EDT)
- ZIP Code: 37643 (Elizabethton)
- Area code: 423
- FIPS code: 47-06020
- GNIS feature ID: 2804627

Biltmore is an unincorporated community and census-designated place (CDP) in Carter County, Tennessee. It was first listed as a CDP prior to the 2020 census.

It is in the northwest part of the county, with the city of Elizabethton, the county seat, bordering it to the south, across the Watauga River. Tennessee State Route 400 runs through the southern part of the community, leading south into Elizabethton and west 5 miles (8 km) to Watauga. U.S. Route 19E runs along the northeast edge of Biltmore, leading north 7 miles (11 km) to U.S. Route 19W at Bluff City and south through Elizabethton 25 miles (40 km) to Elk Park, North Carolina.

Biltmore is drained by Lacy Hollow, Campbell Branch, and Stout Branch, which all flow south to the Watauga River. The Watauga flows west to the South Fork of the Holston River at Boone Lake, and is part of the Tennessee River watershed.

== Demographics ==
Historical population
Census	Pop.	Note	%±
2020	1,837		—
U.S. Decennial Census
