= Bitterlich =

Bitterlich is a German surname. Notable people with the surname include:

- Don Bitterlich (born 1954), American football player
- Eduard Bitterlich (1833–1872), Austrian painter
- Hans Bitterlich (1860–1949), Austrian sculptor
- Walter Bitterlich (1908–2008), Austrian scientist
