= Bitter End, Tennessee =

- Unincorporated community
- Location within Tennessee Location within the United States
- Coordinates: 36°12′42″N 82°02′24″W
- Country: United States
- State: Tennessee
- County: Carter
- Elevation: 3,455 ft (1,053 m)
- Time zone: UTC-5 (Eastern (EST))
  - Summer (DST): UTC-4 (EDT)
- GNIS feature ID: 1314687

Bitter End is an unincorporated community in Carter County, Tennessee, United States.

It is located about 12 mi (19 km) southeast of Elizabethton.

The Markland Cemetery is located north of the settlement. A historic school, the Bitter End School, was located to the south.
