= Cherokee Nation Warriors Society =

Society of Cherokee military veterans

The Cherokee Nation Warriors Society is a society of Cherokee Nation tribal members who are also military veterans, and who were honorably discharged from military service. The society is based in Tahlequah, Oklahoma, and is administered by the Cherokee Nation Office of Veterans Affairs. Most of the society members participate in the Gourd Dance.

Membership in this society is open to all veterans of the Cherokee Nation of any branch of military service. The Cherokee Nation Warriors Society members and those veterans who gave their lives in military service have bricks with their names inscribed paving the Cherokee Nation Warriors Memorial and Pavilion located at the Cherokee Nation Headquarters in Tahlequah, Oklahoma. The memorial, which was installed on 11 November 2005, is dedicated to all Cherokee Citizens and their families who served honorably in the United States Military and to those who gave their lives in defense of the United States and the Cherokee homeland.

A Cherokee Nation Warrior who has received the Cherokee Nation Medal of Patriotism Award can participate in the annual Cherokee Nation Warrior Flight program where Cherokee veterans are funded by the Cherokee Nation to fly to the national war memorial in their honour that is located in Washington D.C.
