= Doe River =

Tributary of the Watauga River in northeast Tennessee, United States

- Doe River flowing from Roan Mountain to Elizabethton, Tennessee

Location
- Country: United States
- State: Tennessee
- Region: Northeast Tennessee
- District: Carter County
- Municipality: Elizabethton

Physical characteristics
- Source: Roan Mountain (Roan Highlands)
  - location: Roan Mountain, Tennessee, Northeast Tennessee, United States
  - coordinates: 36.1470607°N 82.1442922°W
- Mouth: Watauga River
  - location: Elizabethton, Tennessee, Northeast Tennessee, United States
  - coordinates: 36.3570526°N 82.2134656°W

Basin features
- Tributaries
  - left: McCathern Spring
  - right: Little Doe River

The Doe River is a tributary of the Watauga River in northeast Tennessee in the United States. The river forms in Carter County near the North Carolina line, just south of Roan Mountain State Park, and flows to Elizabethton.

== Hydrography ==
The Doe River flows from the northern slopes of Roan Mountain, through Roan Mountain State Park and the center of Roan Mountain, Tennessee, then continues to flow west and is paralleled by U.S. Route 19E. The stream then flows to the east of Fork Mountain; while the Little Doe River flows by Fork Mountain to the west.

=== Hampton and Valley Forge ===
Pushing through a mountain gap just north of Hampton, Tennessee, the volume of the Doe River is increased by the waters flowing from McCathern Spring. Below the confluence of both the Doe River and the Little Doe River at Hampton, the Doe River travels roughly in a northern direction through the Valley Forge community, and is rejoined by U.S. Route 19E outside of Elizabethton.

=== Elizabethton ===
==== Elizabethton Covered Bridge ====
Flowing parallel with U.S. Highway 19-E, the Doe River flows underneath two 19-E bridges at the East Side community before heading in a northwest angle toward the Elizabethton downtown business district. The Elizabethton Covered Bridge is located in downtown Elizabethton, the county seat of Carter County. Connecting 3rd Street and Hattie Avenue, the historic 1882 covered bridge spans the river is adjacent to a city park and county government areas. The bridge is open to pedestrians and bicyclists, but is closed to motor vehicle traffic.

The Doe River spills over a weir dam immediately downstream of the covered bridge, and flows under two 1928 concrete arch bridges in Elizabethton, prior to its confluence with the Watauga River. The first concrete arch bridge is the Elk Avenue Bridge in downtown Elizabethton; the second is locally known as the Broad Street Bridge and carries traffic on Tennessee State Route 67.

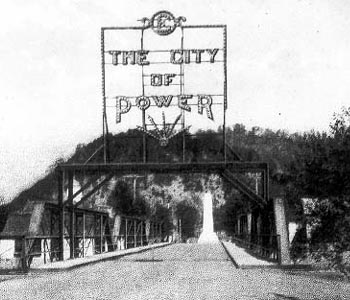

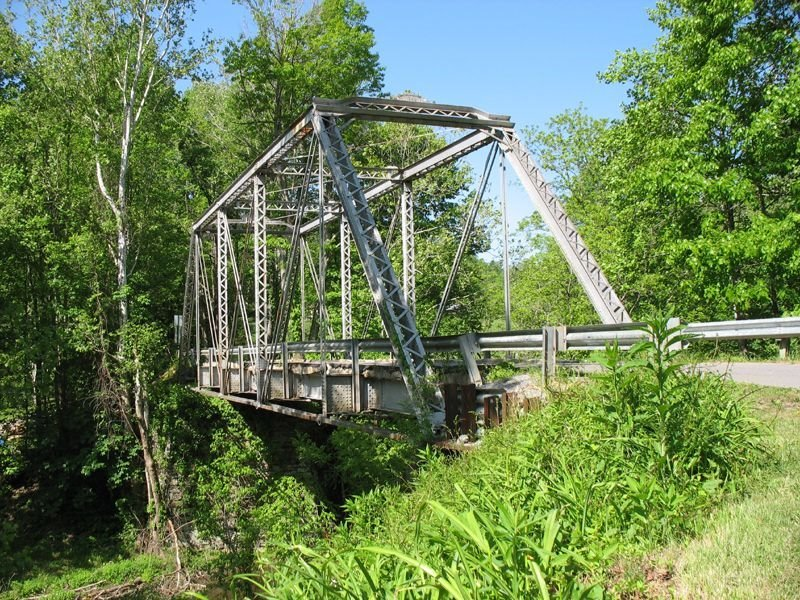

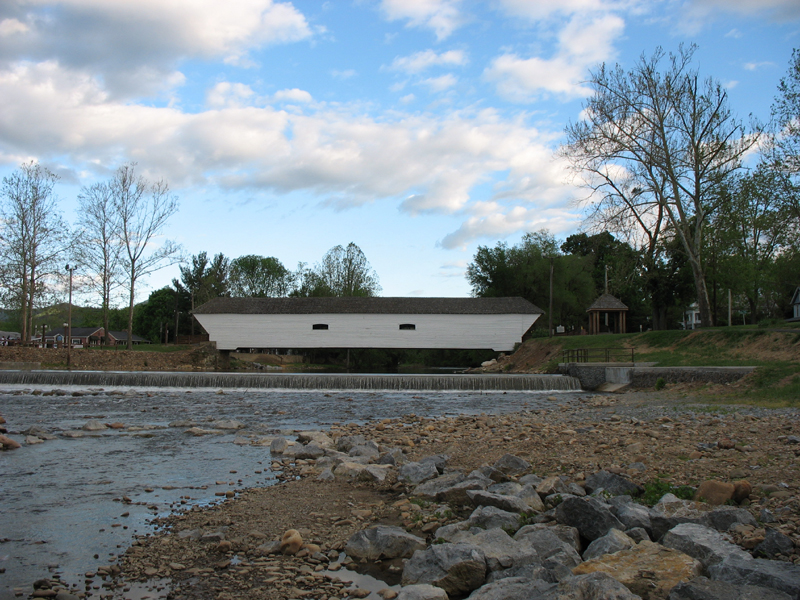

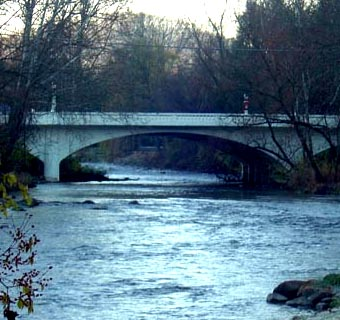

== Whitewater kayaking and river tubing ==
Most of the Doe River section running between the Valley Forge put-in (LAT 36.310833 LONG -82.193055) and the take-out just before the Elizabethton confluence is classified on the International Scale of River Difficulty as Class/Grade I; however there are several brief segments of the Valley Forge-Charity Hill-East Side run that should be approached as Class/Grade II. It takes approximately three hours to float down the Doe River on inner tubes from the Valley Forge put-in to the take-out near the confluence of the Doe River into the Watauga River. Putting in at Hampton High School and taking out at Valley Forge Elementary involves running class 2/3 rapids and is more difficult that the section below Valley Forge school.

All river tubes and kayaks must portage around the weir dam that is located immediately downstream of the covered bridge in downtown Elizabethton.

There is a Class III/IV section of whitewater referred to as the Doe Gorge that begins at the bridge over the river on Bear Cage Rd. and ends at the take-out at Hampton High School. This sections drops between 100 and 160 feet per mile. The gorge is for advanced paddlers only. Paddling through Roan Mtn State Park has been done many times but is not as well documented as the popular gorge section downstream.

=== Influence of weather ===
Unlike the Tennessee Valley Authority (TVA) regulated flow of the Watauga River, the water level of the Doe River often fluctuates with changes in rain fall or drought. Another significant difference between the two Carter County rivers is the variation of water temperatures: while the year round water temperature of the Watauga River is approximately 52-53 degrees Fahrenheit, the water temperature of the Doe River will vary along with the ambient air temperature. The Doe River is generally very comfortable for kayaking and river tubing during the summer months.

The Doe River valley is infrequently subject to severe flooding. The Doe River drains from a mountainous region that can be subject to seasonal heavy rains (May-early June) and snow melts, and the Doe River stream course is in many parts quite steep, allowing water levels to rise rapidly along the river banks. The last severe recent flooding of the Doe River occurred overnight from January 7 through January 8, 1998, with the sudden storms bringing down seven inches (180 mm) of rain in twelve hours and causing the deaths of seven people (including Kingsport rescue worker Carles "Junior" Godsey after his rescue boat overturned in the Doe River flood waters) in the Hampton area. The 1998 Doe River flood created approximately $20 million in Carter County property damages.

Climate of Doe River in Elizabethton, Tennessee
Month	Jan	Feb	Mar	Apr	May	Jun	Jul	Aug	Sep	Oct	Nov	Dec	Annual
Avg °F(°C)	34.0^{°F} 1.1^{°C}	37.4^{°F} 3.0^{°C}	47.2^{°F} 8.4^{°C}	55.2^{°F} 12.9^{°C}	63.4^{°F} 17.4^{°C}	71.1^{°F} 21.7^{°C}	74.4^{°F} 23.6^{°C}	73.6^{°F} 23.1^{°C}	67.9^{°F} 19.9^{°C}	56.7^{°F} 13.7^{°C}	47.0^{°F} 8.3^{°C}	38.2^{°F} 3.4^{°C}	55.5^{°F} 13.1^{°C}
Avg high °F(°C)	43.7^{°F} 6.5^{°C}	48.0^{°F} 8.9^{°C}	58.9^{°F} 14.9^{°C}	67.4^{°F} 19.7^{°C}	75.2^{°F} 24.0^{°C}	82.2^{°F} 27.9^{°C}	84.6^{°F} 29.2^{°C}	84.1^{°F} 28.9^{°C}	79.1^{°F} 26.2^{°C}	69.1^{°F} 20.6^{°C}	58.2^{°F} 14.6^{°C}	48.1^{°F} 8.9^{°C}	66.6^{°F} 19.2^{°C}
Avg low °F(°C)	24.3^{°F} -4.3^{°C}	26.8^{°F} -2.9^{°C}	35.4^{°F} 1.9^{°C}	43.0^{°F} 6.1^{°C}	51.6^{°F} 10.9^{°C}	59.9^{°F} 15.5^{°C}	64.1^{°F} 17.8^{°C}	63.1^{°F} 17.3^{°C}	56.6^{°F} 13.7^{°C}	44.2^{°F} 6.8^{°C}	35.9^{°F} 2.2^{°C}	28.2^{°F} -2.1^{°C}	44.4^{°F} 6.9^{°C}
Rain (inches)	3.2 in.	3.4 in.	3.7 in.	3.3 in.	3.8 in.	3.5 in.	4.3 in.	3.2 in.	3.3 in.	2.6 in.	2.9 in.	3.4 in.	40.7 in.
Snow (inches)	5.2 in.	4.2 in.	2.3 in.	0.4 in.	0.05 in.	0.05 in.	0.0 in.	0.0 in.	0.05 in.	0.0 in.	0.9 in.	2.6 in.	15.6 in.
Sources for Doe River in Elizabethton (Bristol-Johnson City, Tennessee) climate statistics: climate-zone.com'

== See also ==
- List of rivers of Tennessee
