= HMS Bittern =

Seven ships of the Royal Navy have borne the name HMS Bittern, after the bird, the bittern:

- HMS Bittern (1796) was an 18-gun sloop launched in 1796 and sold in 1833.
- HMS Bittern (1840) was a 12-gun brig launched in 1840 and sold in 1860.
- HMS Bittern (1861) was to have been a wood screw sloop. She was ordered in 1861, but construction was cancelled in 1864.
- HMS Bittern (1869) was a wood screw gunvessel launched in 1869 and sold in 1887.
- HMS Bittern (1897) was an Avon-class destroyer launched in 1897 and sunk in a collision in 1918.
- HMS Bittern was to have been a Bittern-class sloop, but she was renamed HMS Enchantress before her launch.
- HMS Bittern (L07) was a Bittern-class sloop, launched in 1937 and sunk in 1940.
