= Tennessee State Route 107 =

Highway in Tennessee

State Route 107
- SR 107; primary in red, secondary in blue, unsigned in green

Route information
- Maintained by TDOT
- Length: 78.77 mi (126.77 km)

Major junctions
- West end: Round Mountain Road south of Del Rio
- US 25 / US 70 in Del Rio; US 11E / US 321 in Tusculum; I-26 / US 19W / US 23 in Erwin
- East end: NC 226 east of Unicoi

Location
- Country: United States
- State: Tennessee
- Counties: Cocke, Greene, Washington, Unicoi

Highway system
- Tennessee State Routes; Interstate; US; State
← SR 106	→ SR 108

State Route 107 (SR 107) is a 78.77-mile-long (126.77 km) state highway in eastern Tennessee, United States. It begins at an intersection with Round Mountain Road south of Del Rio and ends at the North Carolina state line east of Unicoi, where it becomes NC 226.

It travels through the incorporated municipalities of Greeneville, Tusculum, Erwin and Unicoi, and the communities of Del Rio, South Greene, Horse Creek, South Central, Lamar, Embreeville and Limestone Cove.

== Route description ==
=== Cocke County ===
SR 107 begins as a secondary highway in Cocke County near the North Carolina border at an intersection with Ground Squirrel Road and Round Mountain Road, where the road continues as Round Mountain Road in North Carolina. SR 107 goes northwest through narrow valley and mountains to enter Del Rio, where it crosses a bridge over the French Broad River and becomes concurrent with US 25/US 70/SR 9. They then go east to leave Del Rio and parallel the river to an intersection where SR 107 splits off and goes north. The highway then passes through a rugged and remote part of the Cherokee National Forest before crossing into Greene County.

=== Greene County ===
SR 107 then levels out and passes through Houston Valley before entering South Greene and becoming concurrent with SR 70. They then turn northwest and have an intersection with SR 351 and SR 107 Cutoff. The highway then leaves South Greene and crosses over the Nolichucky River just yards from the historic Nolichucky Dam and Davy Crockett Lake. SR 70/SR 107 then continue north into Greeneville where they come to an intersection with US 321/SR 35, where SR 107 leaves SR 70 to become concurrent with US 321/SR 35 to enter downtown. They then have a short concurrency with SR 350 before becoming concurrent US 11E Bus. They continue north through downtown before US 321/SR 35 splits off and goes north while US 11E Bus/SR 107 continue through town before coming to an intersection with US 11E/US 321/SR 34, where US 11E Bus ends and SR 107 becomes concurrent with that highway as they enter the neighboring town of Tusculum. They then have an intersection with Erwin Highway (Former SR 107 through downtown) before bypassing downtown to the north. They then come to an intersection where SR 107 splits off and goes southeast, becoming a primary highway and leaving Tusculum. SR 107 then enters farmland, where it crosses another bridge over the Nolichucky River and has an intersection with SR 351/SR-107 Cutoff, where SR-107 Cutoff ends and SR 107 becomes concurrent with SR 351. SR 351 then turns north and SR 107 continues east to cross into Washington County.

=== Washington County ===
SR 107 then passes through South Central, where it has an intersection with SR 353, before continuing east, then northeast, paralleling the Nolichucky River. The highway then enters Lamar, where it becomes concurrent with SR 81, before leaving Lamar and crossing another bridge over the Nolichucky River, in the community of Embreeville, and crossing into Unicoi County.

=== Unicoi County ===
SR 107/SR 81 then pass through a set of mountains before entering Erwin, where they have an interchange with I-26/US 23/US 19W (Exit 37), where SR 81 ends and SR 107 becomes a secondary highway. The highway then enters downtown and then turns left to cross a new bridge over the railroad tracks before leaving downtown and continuing northeast after turning back onto its former alignment. SR 107 then passes through a major business district, where it has an intersection with SR 395 before having an intersection with Harris Hollow Road, which provides access to an interchange with I-26. SR 107 then leaves Erwin and continues northeast to the town of Unicoi, where it becomes concurrent with SR 173. The highway then winds its way between some mountains to enter Limestone Cove, where SR 173 splits off and goes north while SR 107 continues east to enter the Cherokee National Forest. The highway then becomes very curvy coming to the North Carolina state line, where SR 107 ends and continues east as NC 226.

== Alternate names ==
State Route 107 bears the following names:

- Houston Valley Road From the Cocke-Greene county line to SR 70.
- Asheville Highway while concurrent with SR 70.
- West, South & North Main Streets while concurrent with US 321.
- Tusculum Boulevard while concurrent with US 11E Business.
- East Andrew Johnson Highway while concurrent with US 11E/US 321.
- Tusculum Bypass on the east side of Tusculum to intersection with Erwin Highway.
- Erwin Highway from Tusculum Bypass to Greene-Washington County line.
- Governor John Sevier Highway from Greene-Washington County line to junction with SR 81.
- Highway 81 while concurrent with SR 81.
- Jonesborough Road from Washington-Unicoi County line to North Main Avenue and Second Street intersection in Erwin.
- North Main Avenue from Second Street to Dry Creek Road intersection.
- Unicoi Drive from Dry Creek Road to SR 173.
- Highway 107 from SR 173 to Tennessee-North Carolina state-line.

== History ==
In Greene County, SR 107 formerly went through downtown Tusculum along Erwin Highway, it has since been rerouted along US Route 11E/US Route 321 and the "Tusculum Bypass" a five lane (four lanes and center turn lane) road on the east side of Tusculum, it becomes Erwin Highway on the southeast side of the city. The former alignment is now an Unsigned Business Route.

It Begins on the east side of Greeneville at US 11E/US 321 and travels through downtown Tusculum past Tusculum College and ends at mainline SR 107 on the southeast side of Tusculum.

Beginning in 2010 improvements were made to SR 107's intersection with SR 351/State Route 107 Cutoff just south of the city of Tusculum in Greene County and a traffic signal was installed. The work was completed the following year.

In 2010, the City of Tusculum and the Tennessee Department of Transportation approved improvements to the Tusculum Bypass and Edens Road intersection. The work is said to start in 2014. The work was completed in late September 2014, with added guardrails and flashing beacons.

As of May 21, 2015, SR 107 was rerouted in Erwin from Jonesborough Road to an overpass that bypasses the railroad crossings on that road, in order to increase accessibility to Downtown Erwin.

Flooding from Hurricane Helene on September 27, 2024 caused the Nolichucky River to over flow its banks which led to the Elbert Kinser Bridge collapsing in Greene County.

== State Route 107 Cutoff ==
State Route 107 Cutoff is a portion of Tennessee State Route 351 and a cutoff route of State Route 107.

It begins at Tennessee State Routes 70 and 107 in the South Greene community and goes northeasterly and junctions with Tennessee State Route 350 about halfway through. It continues northeasterly to State Route 107 and ends.

== Major intersections ==
County	Location	mi	km	Destinations	Notes
Cocke	Del Rio	0.0	0.0	Round Mountain Road and Ground Squirrel Road	Western terminus
Cocke	Del Rio			William M. Jones Bridge over French Broad River	
Cocke	Del Rio			US 25 north / US 70 west (SR 9 north) – Newport	Western end of US 25/US 70/SR 9 concurrency
Cocke	Del Rio			US 25 south / US 70 east (SR 9 south) – Hot Springs	Eastern end of US 25/US 70/SR 9 overlap
Greene	South Greene			SR 70 south (Asheville Highway) – Marshall, Asheville	Western end of SR 70 overlap
Greene	South Greene			SR 351 north (SR-107 Cutoff) – Erwin, Tusculum	Southern terminus of SR 351
Greene	South Greene			Oscar B. Lovette Bridge over Nolichucky River	
Greene	Greeneville			US 321 south (West Main Street/SR 35 south) / SR 70 north / US 321 Truck north (70 Bypass) – Newport, Morristown	Eastern end of overlap with SR 70; Western end of overlap with US 321/SR 35
Greene	Greeneville			SR 350 south (East McKee Street) – Camp Creek	Western end of overlap with SR 350
Greene	Greeneville			US 11E Bus. south (SR 350 north/West Summer Street) – Mosheim, Morristown	Eastern end of overlap with SR 350; Western end of overlap with US 11E Business
Greene	Greeneville			US 321 north (North Main Street/SR 35 north)	Eastern end of first overlap with US 321; Eastern end of overlap with SR 35
Greene	Greeneville			US 11E south / US 321 south (East Andrew Johnson Highway/SR 34 west) – Morristown, Mosheim	Northern terminus of and end overlap with US 11E Business, Western end of overlap with US 11E/US 321/SR 34
Greene	Greeneville			Erwin Highway – Tusculum, Tusculum University	Former SR 107
Greene	Tusculum			US 11E north / US 321 north (East Andrew Johnson Highway/SR 34 east) – Limestone, Jonesborough, Johnson City	Eastern end of overlap with US 11E/US 321/SR 34
Greene	Tusculum			Erwin Highway – Tusculum, Tusculum College	Former SR 107; At this intersection SR 107 becomes Erwin Highway
Greene	Tusculum			Sgt. Elbert Kinser Bridge over Nolichucky River	
Greene				SR 351 south (SR-107 Cutoff) – South Greene	Western end of overlap with SR 351
Greene	Horse Creek			SR 351 north (Chuckey Pike) – Chuckey	Eastern end of overlap with SR 351
Washington	South Central			SR 353 north (Bailey Bridge Road) – Jonesborough	Southern terminus of SR 353
Washington	Lamar			SR 81 north – Jonesborough, Fall Branch	Begin overlap with SR 81
Washington	Embreeville			James B. Elliott Memorial Bridge over Nolichucky River	
Unicoi	Erwin			I-26 / US 23 / US 19W – Johnson City, Asheville	Southern terminus of SR 81; end overlap with SR 81; I-26/US 19W/US 23 exit 37
Unicoi	Erwin			Main Avenue – Downtown Erwin	At this intersection SR 107 becomes Main Avenue
Unicoi	Erwin			SR 395 east (Rock Creek Road) – Rock Creek	Western terminus of SR 395
Unicoi	Erwin			Harris Hollow Road To I-26 / US 23 / US 19W – Johnson City, Asheville	
Unicoi	Unicoi			SR 173 west (Unicoi Drive) – Milligan College, Johnson City	Western end of overlap with SR 173
Unicoi	Limestone Cove			SR 173 east (Simerly Creek Road) – Hampton	Eastern of End overlap with SR 173
Unicoi		78.77	126.77	NC 226 – Buladean, Burnsville, Bakersville	Eastern terminus of SR 107 at North Carolina State-line
1.000 mi = 1.609 km; 1.000 km = 0.621 mi: Concurrency terminus
