= Tennessee State Route 351 =

Highway in Tennessee

State Route 351
- Rheatown Road, Chuckey Pike, Erwin Highway, State Route 107 Cutoff
- TN 351 highlighted in red

Route information
- Maintained by TDOT
- Length: 25.4 mi (40.9 km)
- Existed: July 1, 1983–present

Major junctions
- South end: SR 70 / SR 107 near South Greene
- SR 107 in Tusculum; US 11E / US 321 in Chuckey
- North end: SR 93 in Newmansville

Location
- Country: United States
- State: Tennessee
- Counties: Greene

Highway system
- Tennessee State Routes; Interstate; US; State
← SR 350	→ SR 352

State Route 351 (SR 351) is a state highway in Greene County, Tennessee. It begins at State Routes 70 and 107 in southern Greene County and ends at State Route 93 in northern Greene County. It forms a half loop around Greeneville and Tusculum.

== Route description ==
SR 351 begins at a y-intersection with SR 70 and SR 107 near South Greene. It goes northeast as State Route 107 cutoff, where it winds its way through farmland, running parallel to the Nolichucky River, to have an intersection with SR 350. SR 351 continues northeast to become concurrent with SR 107, where it becomes known as Erwin Highway as they turn southeast. They pass through rural areas before SR 351 splits off at a y-intersection as Chuckey Pike. It winds its way northwest through farmland before crossing a bridge over the Nolichucky River, where it leaves the river for good, before passing through Chuckey, where it has an intersection with US 11E/US 321/SR 34. SR 351 continues northwest as Rheatown Road through rural areas before entering Newmansville and coming to an end at an intersection with SR 93.

SR 351 is a rural 2-lane highway for its entire length.

== 2010 widening project ==
Improvements were made to 351's 2nd intersection with SR 107 on the south Side of Tusculum in 2010 which widened the intersection and installed a traffic light/signal.

== Major intersections ==
The entire route is in Greene County.

Location	mi	km	Destinations	Notes
South Greene	0	0.0	SR 70 / SR 107 (Asheville Highway) – Greeneville, Asheville	Southern terminus
			SR 350 north (Jones Bridge Road) / Greystone Road – Greeneville, Camp Creek	Southern terminus of SR 350, Road continues southbound as Greystone Road; Access to Camp Creek Via Greystone Road
Tusculum			SR 107 west (Erwin Highway) – Tusculum	Begin overlap with SR 107
			SR 107 east (Erwin Highway) – Lamar, Erwin	End overlap with SR 107
Chuckey			US 11E / US 321 (East Andrew Johnson Highway/SR 34) – Tusculum, Greeneville, Jonesborough, Johnson City	
			Snapps Ferry Road – Greeneville	
Newmansville			SR 93 (Kingsport Highway) – Greeneville, Fall Branch	Northern terminus
1.000 mi = 1.609 km; 1.000 km = 0.621 mi: Concurrency terminus
