= Tennessee State Route 395 =

State highway in Tennessee, United States

State Route 395
- Rock Creek Road
- TN 395 highlighted in red

Route information
- Maintained by TDOT
- Length: 6.1 mi (9.8 km)

Major junctions
- West end: SR 107 in Erwin
- East end: NC 197 at the North Carolina state line near Poplar, NC

Location
- Country: United States
- State: Tennessee
- Counties: Unicoi

Highway system
- Tennessee State Routes; Interstate; US; State
| ← SR 394 | → SR 396 |

State Route 395 (SR 395), also known as Rock Creek Road, is a 6.1-mile-long (9.8 km) east–west state highway in Unicoi County, Tennessee. It connects the town of Erwin with the Rock Creek Recreation Area of the Cherokee National Forest and North Carolina Highway 197 (NC 197) at the state line.

== Route description ==
SR 395 begins in Erwin at an intersection with SR 107 north of downtown. It heads east through neighborhoods before entering the mountains, and the Cherokee National Forest, to pass by the Rock Creek Recreation Area. SR 395 then turns south and winds its way up as it ascends the mountains to Indian Grave Gap and the North Carolina state line, where it continues south as NC 197. The entire route of SR 395 is a two-lane highway.

== Major intersections ==
The entire route is in Unicoi County.

| Location | mi | km | Destinations | Notes |
|---|---|---|---|---|
| Erwin | 0.0 | 0.0 | SR 107 (N Main Avenue) to I-26 – Greeneville, Unicoi | Western terminus |
| Cherokee National Forest | 6.1 | 9.8 | NC 197 south – Red Hill | North Carolina state line; eastern terminus |
1.000 mi = 1.609 km; 1.000 km = 0.621 mi
