= Tennessee State Route 173 =

State highway in Tennessee, United States

State Route 173
- SR 173 highlighted in red

Route information
- Maintained by TDOT
- Length: 13.1 mi (21.1 km)

Major junctions
- West end: I-26 / US 19W / US 23 in Unicoi
- SR 107 in Unicoi
- East end: US 19E in Tiger Valley

Location
- Country: United States
- State: Tennessee
- Counties: Unicoi, Carter

Highway system
- Tennessee State Routes; Interstate; US; State
← SR 172	→ SR 174

State Route 173 (SR 173) is a state highway in Unicoi and Carter counties in the U.S. state of Tennessee. It connects the town of Unicoi with the community of Tiger Valley.

== Route description ==
SR 173 begins in Unicoi County at Interstate 26/U.S. Route 19W/U.S. Route 23 (I-26/US 19W/US 23) exit 32 in the town of Unicoi. It goes eastward for several blocks before turning southward onto Unicoi Drive. SR 173 follows Unicoi Drive for less than one mile (1.6 km) to a junction with SR 107, which approaches from Erwin to the south. The merged SR 107/SR 173 goes eastward through rural mountain areas until reaching the community of Limestone Cove, where SR 107 turns southward toward the North Carolina border, and SR 173 turns northeastward through rural mountainous terrain to cross into Carter County and enter the community of Tiger Valley, where it comes to an end at US 19E. From here, US 19E continues eastward to Roan Mountain, and northwestward to Hampton.

== Major intersections ==
County	Location	mi	km	Destinations	Notes
Unicoi	Unicoi	0.00	0.00	I-26 / US 19W / US 23 – Johnson City, Asheville	Western terminus; I-26/US 19W/US 23 exit 32
Unicoi	Unicoi	0.04	0.064	Unicoi Drive – Johnson City	SR 173 turns south onto Unicoi Drive; former US 19W/US 23
Unicoi	Unicoi	1.01	1.63	SR 107 west (Unicoi Drive) – Erwin	Western end of SR 107 concurrency
Unicoi	Limestone Cove	6.06	9.75	SR 107 east (Limestone Cove Road) – Buladean	Eastern end of SR 107 concurrency
Carter	Tiger Valley	13.10	21.08	US 19E (SR 37) – Roan Mountain, Hampton, Elizabethton	Eastern terminus
1.000 mi = 1.609 km; 1.000 km = 0.621 mi: Concurrency terminus
