= Tennessee State Route 350 =

Highway in Tennessee

State Route 350
- TN 350 highlighted in red

Route information
- Maintained by TDOT
- Length: 7.5 mi (12.1 km)
- Existed: July 1, 1983–present

Major junctions
- South end: SR 351 near Camp Creek
- US 321 / SR 107 in Downtown Greeneville US 11E Bus. in Downtown Greeneville
- North end: US 11E / US 321 Truck / SR 70 in Greeneville

Location
- Country: United States
- State: Tennessee
- Counties: Greene

Highway system
- Tennessee State Routes; Interstate; US; State
← SR 349	→ SR 351

State Route 350 (SR 350) is a state highway in Greene County, Tennessee.

== Route description ==
SR 350 begins in Greeneville unsigned with a concurrency with US 11E Bus and SR 70 at their intersection with US 11E, it continues south where SR 70 heads south and SR 350 and US 11E Bus head east to US 321 and SR 107 where SR 350 heads south along US 321 and US 11E Bus heads north, it then branches off of US 321 heads more southeastward to end at SR 351 in south central Greene County south of Greeneville and north of Camp Creek.

The entire route is in Greene County.

== Major intersections ==
The entire route is in Greene County.

Location	mi	km	Destinations	Notes
			SR 351 (SR-107 Cutoff) / Greystone Road – Camp Creek	Southern terminus
Greeneville			US 321 south / SR 107 west (S Main Street/SR 35 south) – Newport	Southern end of unsigned concurrency with US 321/SR 107/SR 35; SR 350 becomes unsigned
Greeneville			US 11E Bus. south (W Summer Street) / US 321 north / SR 107 east (S Main Street/SR 35 north) – Tusculum	Northern end of unsigned concurrency with US 321/SR 107/SR 35; southern end of unsigned wrong-way concurrency with US 11E Business
Greeneville			US 321 Truck south / SR 70 south (70 Bypass) – Asheville, NC	Southern end of unsigned concurrency with US 321 Truck/SR 70
Greeneville			US 11E / US 321 Truck north / SR 70 north (W Andrew Johnson Highway/SR 34) – Johnson City, Morristown, Mosheim, Tusculum	Northern terminus of SR 350; southern terminus of US 11E Business; interchange; Road continues as Blue Springs Parkway to Moshiem
1.000 mi = 1.609 km; 1.000 km = 0.621 mi: Concurrency terminus
