= Unicoi County, Tennessee =

County in Tennessee, United States

- County
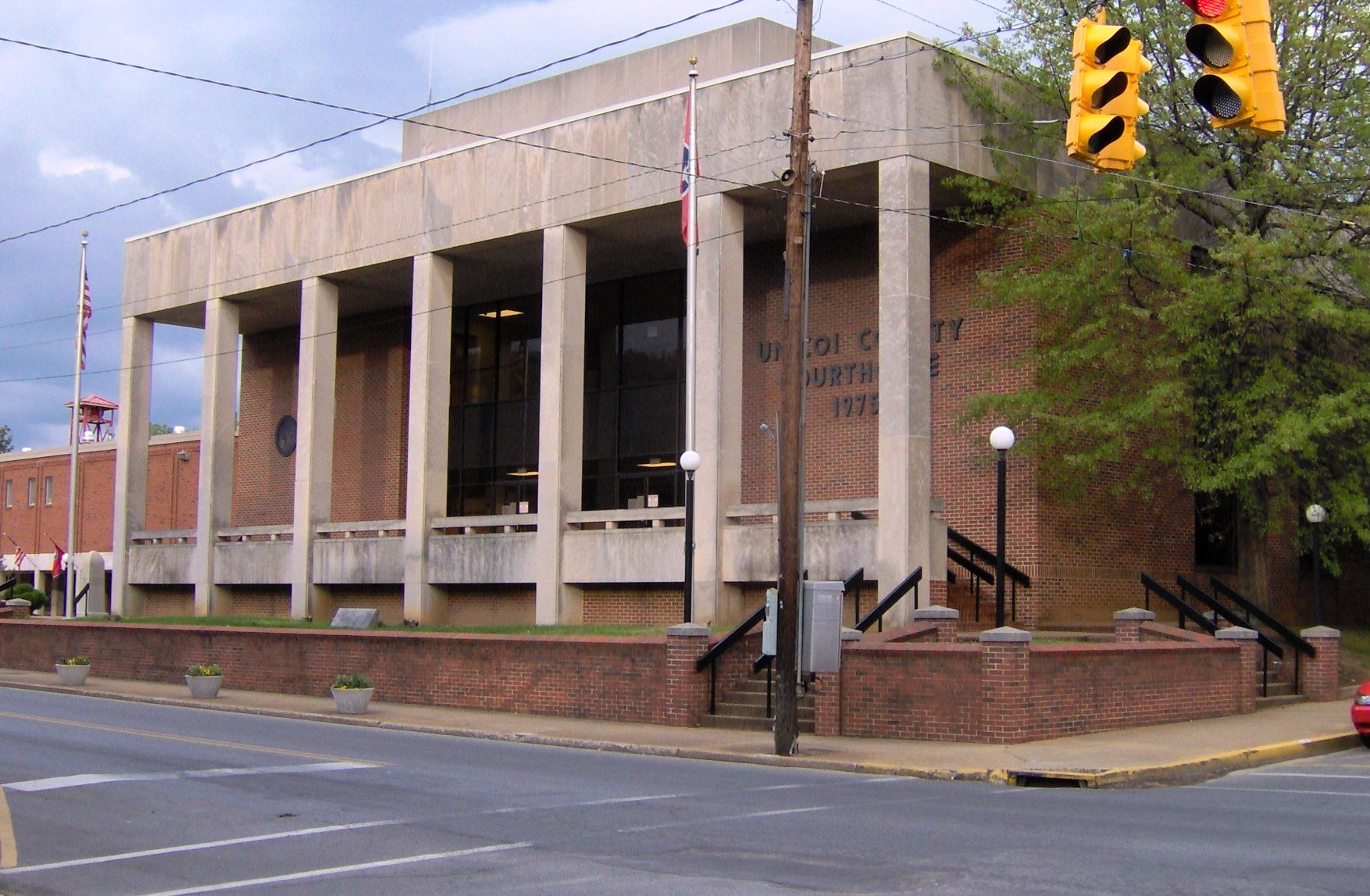
- Unicoi County Courthouse in Erwin

- Seal Logo

- Location within the U.S. state of Tennessee
- Coordinates: 36°06′N 82°26′W
- Country: United States
- State: Tennessee
- Founded: March 23, 1875
- Named for: Cherokee word for "fog-draped" or "hazy"
- Seat: Erwin
- Largest town: Erwin

Area
  - Total: 186 sq mi (480 km^{2})
  - Land: 186 sq mi (480 km^{2})
  - Water: 0.3 sq mi (0.78 km^{2}) 0.2%

Population (2020)
  - Total: 17,928
  - Estimate (2025): 17,856 ▼
  - Density: 98/sq mi (38/km^{2})
- Time zone: UTC−5 (Eastern)
  - Summer (DST): UTC−4 (EDT)
- Congressional district: 1st
- Website: unicoicountytn.com

Unicoi County (/ˈjuːnɪˌkɔɪ/) is a county located in the U.S. state of Tennessee. As of the 2020 census, the population was 17,928. Its county seat is Erwin. Unicoi is a Cherokee word meaning "white," "hazy," "fog-like," or "fog draped," and refers to the mist often seen in the foothills and mountains of this far northeast county. Unicoi County is part of the Johnson City metropolitan area, which is a component of the "Tri-Cities" region.

== History ==
This area was long inhabited by Indigenous peoples, including the historic Cherokee who encountered European and English traders and settlers. The mountainous terrain made it less attractive to subsistence farmers.

Unicoi County was created in 1875 from portions of Washington and Carter counties. Its first European-American settlers had arrived more than a century earlier but the population had been small. The county remained predominantly agrarian until the railroads were constructed in the area in the 1880s.

During the 1910s, the Clinchfield Railroad established a pottery in Erwin, which eventually incorporated under the name, "Southern Potteries." This company produced a popular brand of dishware, commonly called Blue Ridge China, which featured hand-painted underglaze designs. While the company folded in the 1950s, Blue Ridge dishes remain popular with antique collectors.

On September 13, 1916, a circus elephant, Mary, was hanged in Erwin for killing her trainer in nearby Kingsport. The hanging was the subject of a book, The Day They Hung the Elephant (1992), by Charles Edwin Price.

== Geography ==
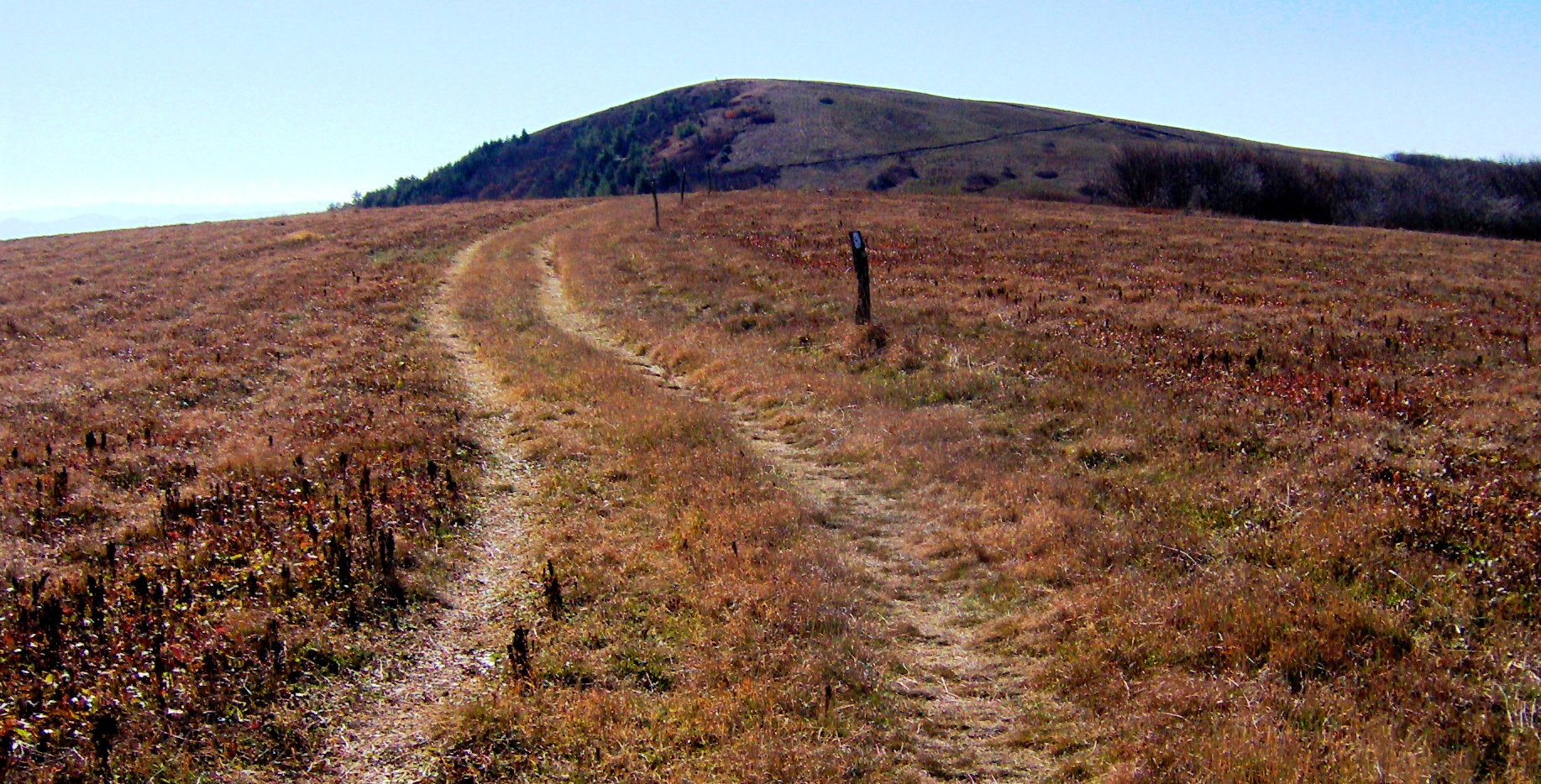
The Appalachian Trail approaching the summit of Big Bald

According to the U.S. Census Bureau, the county has a total area of 186 square miles (480 km^{2}), of which 186 square miles (480 km^{2}) is land and 0.3 square miles (0.78 km^{2}) (0.2%) is water. It is the fifth-smallest county in Tennessee by total area. The Nolichucky River, which enters Unicoi County from North Carolina, is the county's primary drainage.

Unicoi County is situated entirely within the Blue Ridge Mountains, specifically the Bald Mountains (south of the Nolichucky) and the Unaka Range (north of the Nolichucky). Big Bald, which at 5,516 feet (1,681 m) is the highest mountain in the Balds, is also Unicoi County's high point. Traversed by the Appalachian Trail, the mountain is topped by a grassy bald, allowing a 360-degree view of the surrounding mountains.

=== Adjacent counties ===
- Washington County (north)
- Carter County (northeast)
- Mitchell County, North Carolina (east)
- Yancey County, North Carolina (south)
- Madison County, North Carolina (southwest)
- Greene County (west)

=== National protected areas ===
- Appalachian Trail (part)
- Cherokee National Forest (part)

=== State protected areas ===
- Rocky Fork State Park

=== Major highways ===
- I-26
- US 19W
- SR 36
- SR 107
- SR 173
- SR 352
- SR 395

== Demographics ==
Historical population
Census	Pop.	Note	%±
1880	3,645		—
1890	4,619		26.7%
1900	5,851		26.7%
1910	7,201		23.1%
1920	10,120		40.5%
1930	12,678		25.3%
1940	14,128		11.4%
1950	15,886		12.4%
1960	15,082		−5.1%
1970	15,254		1.1%
1980	16,362		7.3%
1990	16,549		1.1%
2000	17,667		6.8%
2010	18,313		3.7%
2020	17,928		−2.1%
2025 (est.)	17,856	▼	−0.4%
U.S. Decennial Census; 1790-1960 1900-1990; 1990-2000 2010-2014

=== Racial and ethnic composition ===
Unicoi County, Tennessee – Racial and ethnic composition Note: the US Census treats Hispanic/Latino as an ethnic category. This table excludes Latinos from the racial categories and assigns them to a separate category. Hispanics/Latinos may be of any race.
Race / ethnicity (NH = Non-Hispanic)	Pop 1980	Pop 1990	Pop 2000	Pop 2010	Pop 2020	% 1980	% 1990	% 2000	% 2010	% 2020
White alone (NH)	16,213	16,421	17,161	17,348	16,175	99.09%	99.23%	97.14%	94.73%	90.22%
Black or African American alone (NH)	4	3	10	35	44	0.02%	0.02%	0.06%	0.19%	0.25%
Native American or Alaska Native alone (NH)	19	10	33	41	38	0.12%	0.06%	0.19%	0.22%	0.21%
Asian alone (NH)	24	14	14	30	37	0.15%	0.08%	0.08%	0.16%	0.21%
Native Hawaiian or Pacific Islander alone (NH)	x	x	4	2	0	x	x	0.02%	0.01%	0.00%
Other race alone (NH)	2	4	4	5	21	0.01%	0.02%	0.02%	0.03%	0.12%
Mixed race or Multiracial (NH)	x	x	99	158	506	x	x	0.56%	0.86%	2.82%
Hispanic or Latino (any race)	100	97	342	694	1,107	0.61%	0.59%	1.94%	3.79%	6.17%
Total	16,362	16,549	17,667	18,313	17,928	100.00%	100.00%	100.00%	100.00%	100.00%

=== 2020 census ===
As of the 2020 census, the county had a population of 17,928, 7,638 households, and 4,953 families, and the median age was 47.7 years.

17.9% of residents were under the age of 18 and 24.2% were 65 years of age or older; for every 100 females there were 98.6 males, and for every 100 females age 18 and over there were 95.8 males age 18 and over.

The racial makeup of the county was 91.4% White, 0.2% Black or African American, 0.4% American Indian and Alaska Native, 0.2% Asian, <0.1% Native Hawaiian and Pacific Islander, 2.7% from some other race, and 5.1% from two or more races; Hispanic or Latino residents of any race comprised 6.2% of the population.

48.6% of residents lived in urban areas, while 51.4% lived in rural areas.

There were 7,638 households, of which 24.3% had children under the age of 18 living in them; 47.8% were married-couple households, 19.6% were households with a male householder and no spouse or partner present, and 26.0% were households with a female householder and no spouse or partner present. About 30.4% of all households were made up of individuals and 15.4% had someone living alone who was 65 years of age or older.

There were 8,702 housing units, of which 12.2% were vacant; among occupied housing units, 72.0% were owner-occupied and 28.0% were renter-occupied, with homeowner and rental vacancy rates of 1.9% and 7.4%, respectively.

=== 2000 census ===
As of the census of 2000, there were 17,667 people, 7,516 households, and 5,223 families residing in the county. The population density was 95 people per square mile (37 people/km^{2}). There were 8,214 housing units at an average density of 44 units per square mile (17/km^{2}). The racial makeup of the county was 97.96% White, 0.07% Black or African American, 0.25% Native American, 0.08% Asian, 0.03% Pacific Islander, 0.95% from other races, and 0.66% from two or more races. 1.94% of the population were Hispanic or Latino of any race.

There were 7,516 households, out of which 26.60% had children under the age of 18 living with them, 56.40% were married couples living together, 9.50% had a female householder with no husband present, and 30.50% were non-families. 27.50% of all households were made up of individuals, and 13.40% had someone living alone who was 65 years of age or older. The average household size was 2.31 and the average family size was 2.80.

In the county, the population was spread out, with 20.50% under the age of 18, 7.50% from 18 to 24, 27.50% from 25 to 44, 26.50% from 45 to 64, and 18.10% who were 65 years of age or older. The median age was 42 years. For every 100 females, there were 95.10 males. For every 100 females age 18 and over, there were 91.60 males.

The median income for a household in the county was $29,863, and the median income for a family was $36,871. Males had a median income of $30,206 versus $20,379 for females. The per capita income for the county was $15,612. About 8.70% of families and 13.10% of the population were below the poverty line, including 17.70% of those under age 18 and 13.50% of those age 65 or over.

== Communities ==
=== Towns ===
- Erwin (county seat)
- Unicoi

=== Census-designated place ===
- Banner Hill

=== Unincorporated communities ===
- Bumpus Cove (partial)
- Clearbranch
- Flag Pond
- Limestone Cove
- Shallowford

== Politics ==
Voters of Unicoi County, like most of eastern Tennessee, have been strongly affiliated with the Republican Party since before the Civil War, when it was a Unionist enclave. Since its founding, it has supported the Republican presidential candidate in all but one election (1912, when it backed Theodore Roosevelt's Progressive Party campaign).

At the state level, Unicoi County has historically been slightly more receptive to Democratic candidates, generally when they win by landslides. It often supported Democratic candidates for governor in the Solid South era, when white conservatives largely were affiliated as Democrats. More recently, it backed Democrat Ned McWherter in the 1986 and 1990 gubernatorial elections and Phil Bredesen in 2006, when he won every county in the state.

United States presidential election results for Unicoi County, Tennessee
Year	Republican		Democratic		Third party(ies)	
Year	No.	%	No.	%	No.	%
1912	280	22.84%	170	13.87%	776	63.30%
1916	961	80.96%	226	19.04%	0	0.00%
1920	2,584	82.42%	547	17.45%	4	0.13%
1924	1,381	72.68%	381	20.05%	138	7.26%
1928	2,043	84.25%	375	15.46%	7	0.29%
1932	1,716	66.87%	850	33.13%	0	0.00%
1936	1,850	67.13%	879	31.89%	27	0.98%
1940	1,863	64.67%	985	34.19%	33	1.15%
1944	1,992	71.89%	779	28.11%	0	0.00%
1948	1,927	67.35%	844	29.50%	90	3.15%
1952	3,453	74.81%	1,163	25.19%	0	0.00%
1956	3,978	77.71%	1,111	21.70%	30	0.59%
1960	4,004	75.04%	1,322	24.78%	10	0.19%
1964	2,731	57.73%	2,000	42.27%	0	0.00%
1968	3,327	65.49%	910	17.91%	843	16.59%
1972	3,877	81.35%	822	17.25%	67	1.41%
1976	3,211	55.53%	2,526	43.69%	45	0.78%
1980	3,828	65.50%	1,880	32.17%	136	2.33%
1984	4,249	71.07%	1,696	28.37%	34	0.57%
1988	3,664	66.79%	1,794	32.70%	28	0.51%
1992	3,344	51.87%	2,375	36.84%	728	11.29%
1996	3,122	54.25%	2,131	37.03%	502	8.72%
2000	3,780	58.80%	2,566	39.91%	83	1.29%
2004	5,030	67.40%	2,374	31.81%	59	0.79%
2008	5,011	69.38%	2,107	29.17%	105	1.45%
2012	5,032	71.01%	1,913	27.00%	141	1.99%
2016	5,671	78.82%	1,262	17.54%	262	3.64%
2020	6,599	79.44%	1,615	19.44%	93	1.12%
2024	6,876	80.51%	1,578	18.48%	87	1.02%

== Education ==
All Unicoi County residents are in the Unicoi County School District.

== See also ==
- National Register of Historic Places listings in Unicoi County, Tennessee
