= Shallowford =

Shallowford may refer to:

- Shallowford, Devon, England
- Shallowford, Staffordshire, England
- Shallowford, Tennessee, United States
