= Brad Teague =

American stock car racing driver

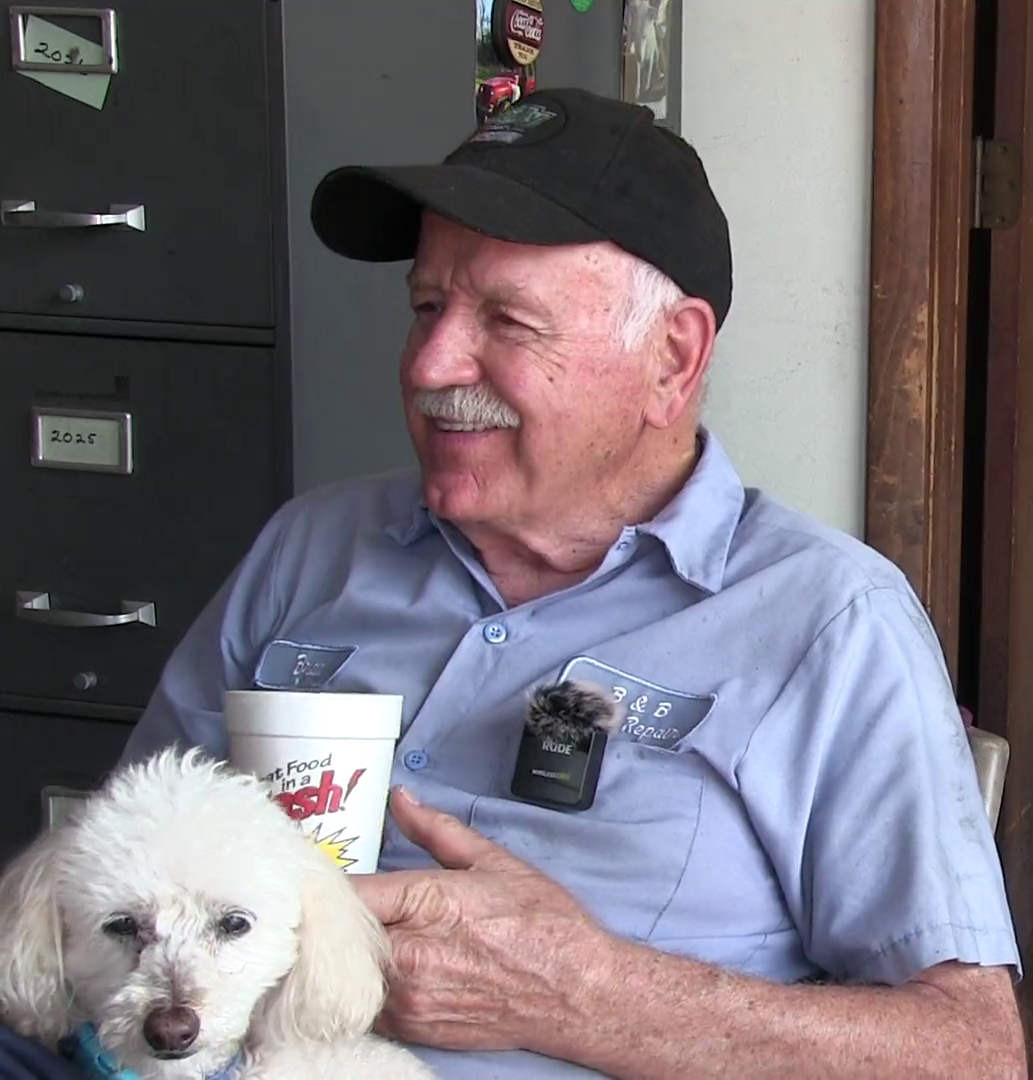
- Brad Teague and his dog Hot Rod in 2026
- Born: December 9, 1947 (age 78); Buladean, North Carolina, U.S.

NASCAR Cup Series career
- 44 races run over 9 years
- Best finish: 32nd (1982)
- First race: 1982 Valleydale 500 (Bristol)
- Last race: 1994 Goody's 500 (Martinsville)
Wins	Top tens	Poles
0	0	0

NASCAR O'Reilly Auto Parts Series career
- 241 races run over 27 years
- 2015 position: 71st
- Best finish: 7th (1987)
- First race: 1982 Southeastern 150 (Bristol)
- Last race: 2015 Food City 300 (Bristol)
- First win: 1987 Miller 500 (Martinsville)
Wins	Top tens	Poles
1	43	2

NASCAR FedEx Freight Truck Series career
- 9 races run over 4 years
- Best finish: 50th (1997)
- First race: 1997 Loadhandler 200 (Bristol)
- Last race: 2004 American Racing Wheels 200 (Fontana)
Wins	Top tens	Poles
0	0	0
- Statistics up to date as of August 21, 2015.

Brad Teague (born December 9, 1947) is an American professional stock car racing driver. He is a veteran of the NASCAR Winston Cup Series, Nationwide Series, and Camping World Truck Series.

== Personal life ==
Teague was born in Buladean, North Carolina, growing up in the mountains; he remains a resident of Johnson City.

== Racing career ==
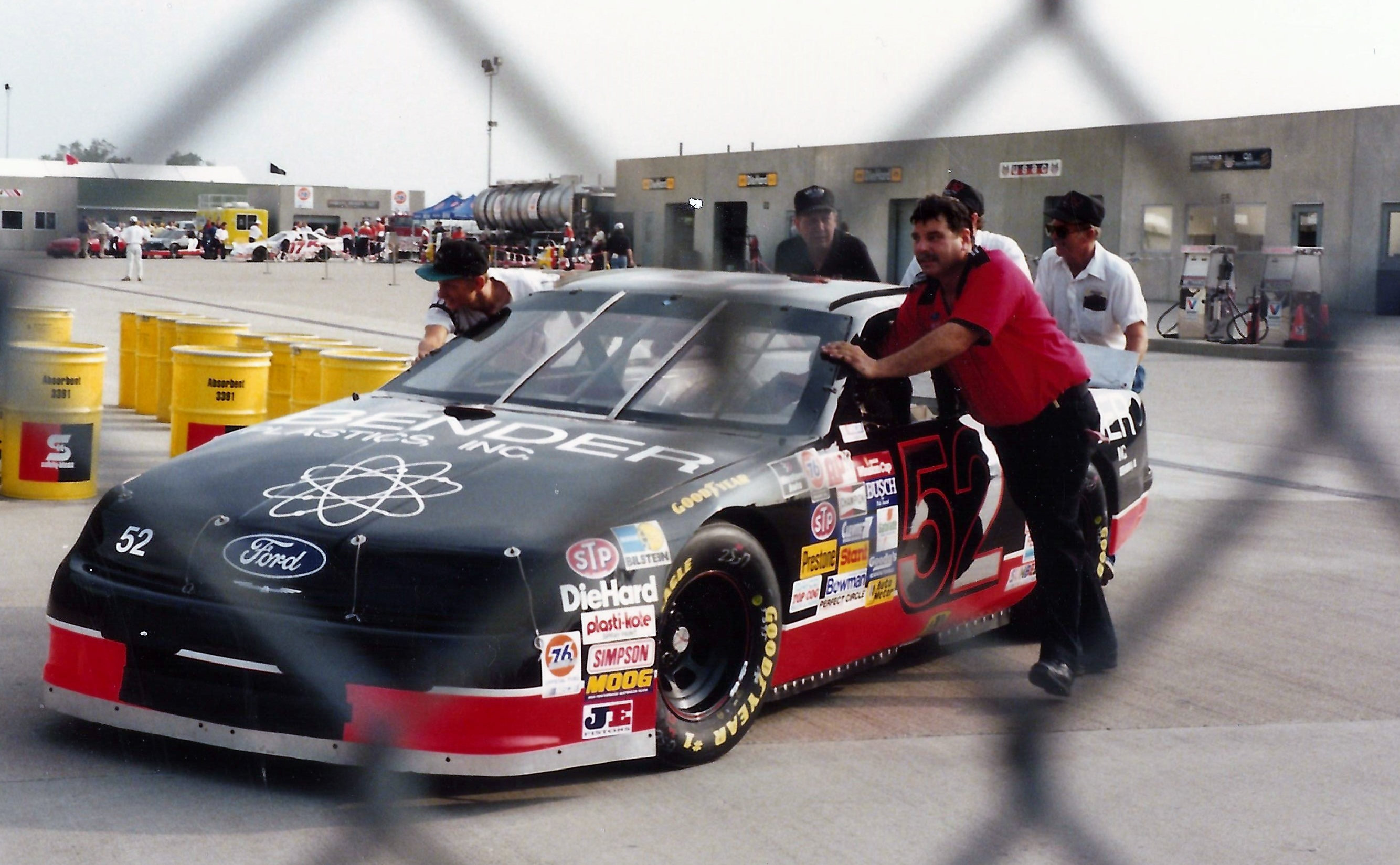
Teague's car at the 1994 Brickyard 400

Teague has competed in NASCAR's top series since 1982, when he made his debut in both the Winston Cup Series (currently the Cup Series) and the Busch Series (now the O'Reilly Auto Parts Series). He has also competed in the Sportsman Series during the 1980s, and the Craftsman Truck Series, in the late 1990s and early 2000s.

Teague's best career finish in the Winston Cup Series came at Martinsville Speedway in 1982, where he finished eleventh. In 1989, he posted the fastest time in third-day qualifying for the Daytona 500, but did not compete in the race or in the Twin 125 qualifying races. Teague attempted to qualify for the 1994 Brickyard 400 but was not fast enough to make the race.

As one of the few remaining drivers who has competed in the Xfinity Series since its founding in 1982, Teague has one career win in the series; this came at Martinsville in 1987, while driving the No. 75 Food Country U.S.A. Chevrolet, where he won the Miller 500. In 2004, Teague was fined $2,500 by NASCAR for a post-race altercation with members of Kevin Harvick's race team at Lowe's Motor Speedway.

Teague has also made nine starts in the Craftsman Truck Series between 1997 and 2004, posting a best finish of thirteenth in his first race in the series at Bristol International Raceway in 1997.

Teague competed in NASCAR in 2012, running selected races, primarily at Bristol Motor Speedway, for JD Motorsports in the No. 4 Chevrolet.

Teague ran several races in the No. 70 Chevrolet of NEMCO-JRR Motorsports with sponsorship from SCAG Mowers.

Teague made his final NASCAR start on August 21, 2015 for the Food City 300 at Bristol Motor Speedway. Teague ran the No. 13 Automated Building Systems Toyota for MBM Motorsports. Teague was having one of his best runs in years, inside the top-25 with five laps to go, when he wrecked along with Harrison Rhodes, and finished the race in the 26th position.

As of 2025, Teague competes weekly in the Late Model division at Kingsport Speedway in Kingsport, Tennessee.

== Motorsports career results ==
=== NASCAR ===
(key) (Bold – Pole position awarded by qualifying time. Italics – Pole position earned by points standings or practice time. * – Most laps led.)

==== Nextel Cup Series ====
NASCAR Nextel Cup Series results
Year	Team	No.	Make	1	2	3	4	5	6	7	8	9	10	11	12	13	14	15	16	17	18	19	20	21	22	23	24	25	26	27	28	29	30	31	32	33	34	35	36	NNCC	Pts	Ref
1982	Henderson Motorsports	26	Chevy	DAY; DNQ	RCH	BRI; 12	ATL; 13	CAR	DAR	NWS; 22	MAR; 11	TAL	NSV; 20		CLT; 24	POC; 25	RSD	MCH	DAY	NSV	POC	TAL	MCH	BRI; 15	DAR	RCH	DOV	NWS	CLT	MAR	CAR	ATL	RSD							32nd	966	
1982	Henderson Motorsports	26	Pontiac											DOV; 25																										32nd	966	
1986	Ball Motorsports	99	Chevy	DAY	RCH	CAR	ATL	BRI	DAR	NWS	MAR	TAL	DOV	CLT; 40	RSD	POC	MCH	DAY; DNQ	POC	TAL	GLN	MCH	BRI; 21	DAR	RCH	DOV	MAR	NWS	CLT; 40	CAR	ATL	RSD								68th	186	
1987	Ball Motorsports	99	Chevy	DAY	CAR	RCH	ATL	DAR	NWS	BRI	MAR	TAL	CLT; 40	DOV	POC	RSD	MCH	DAY; 41	POC	TAL	GLN	MCH																		55th	319	
1987	Hamby Motorsports	12	Olds																				BRI; 25	DAR	RCH	DOV	MAR	NWS												55th	319	
1987	Bob Clark Motorsports	31	Olds																										CLT; 13	CAR	RSD	ATL; 17								55th	319	
1988	Bob Clark Motorsports	31	Olds	DAY; 21	RCH; 19	CAR; 39	ATL; 36	DAR; 20	BRI; 27	NWS; DNQ	MAR; 19	TAL; 21	CLT	DOV	RSD	POC	MCH	DAY	POC	TAL	GLN	MCH	BRI	DAR	RCH															40th	802	
1988	Arrington Racing	67	Ford																							DOV; 23	MAR; 15		NWS; DNQ	CAR; 35	PHO									40th	802	
1988	Arrington Racing	67	Chevy																									CLT; 15												40th	802	
1988	Potter Racing	64	Chevy																													ATL; 39								40th	802	
1989	Arrington Racing	67	Pontiac	DAY; QL^{†}	CAR	ATL	RCH	DAR	BRI; 17	NWS	MAR	TAL	CLT	DOV	SON	POC	MCH	DAY	POC	TAL	GLN	MCH	BRI	DAR	RCH	DOV	MAR													68th	112	
1989	TriStar Motorsports	18	Pontiac																									CLT; 31	NWS	CAR	PHO	ATL								68th	112	
1991	Ball Motorsports	99	Chevy	DAY; DNQ	RCH	CAR	ATL	DAR	BRI	NWS	MAR	TAL	CLT; DNQ	DOV	SON	POC	MCH	DAY	POC	TAL	GLN	MCH	BRI	DAR	RCH	DOV	MAR	NWS	CLT; 21	CAR	PHO	ATL								70th	100	
1992	Ball Motorsports	99	Chevy	DAY; DNQ	CAR	RCH	ATL	DAR										DAY; 29	POC	TAL	GLN	MCH	BRI	DAR	RCH	DOV	MAR	NWS	CLT	CAR	PHO	ATL								58th	176	
1992	Jimmy Means Racing	52	Pontiac						BRI; 21	NWS	MAR	TAL	CLT	DOV	SON	POC	MCH																							58th	176	
1993	Ball Motorsports	99	Chevy	DAY; DNQ	CAR	RCH	ATL	DAR	BRI	NWS	MAR	TAL	SON	CLT	DOV	POC	MCH								DAR; 38	RCH	DOV	MAR	NWS	CLT; DNQ	CAR	PHO	ATL							85th	49	
1993	Ball Motorsports	99	Ford															DAY; DNQ	NHA	POC	TAL	GLN	MCH	BRI																85th	49	
1994	Jimmy Means Racing	52	Ford	DAY; DNQ	CAR	RCH	ATL	DAR; 24	BRI; DNQ	NWS	MAR	TAL	SON	CLT; 41	DOV; 40	POC	MCH; DNQ	DAY; DNQ	NHA	POC	TAL; 28	IND; DNQ	GLN	MCH; DNQ	BRI; 22	DAR; 30	RCH; DNQ	DOV; 40	MAR; 27	NWS; DNQ	CLT; DNQ	CAR; DNQ	PHO							45th	548	
1994	Jimmy Means Racing	53	Ford																															ATL; DNQ						45th	548	
1995	Jimmy Means Racing	52	Ford	DAY	CAR	RCH	ATL	DAR; DNQ	BRI; DNQ	NWS	MAR	TAL	SON	CLT	DOV	POC	MCH	DAY	NHA	POC	TAL	IND	GLN	MCH	BRI	DAR; DNQ	RCH	DOV	MAR	NWS	CLT	CAR	PHO	ATL						NA	-	
2004	Kirk Shelmerdine Racing	72	Ford	DAY	CAR	LVS	ATL	DAR	BRI	TEX	MAR	TAL	CAL	RCH	CLT	DOV	POC	MCH	SON	DAY	CHI	NHA	POC	IND	GLN	MCH	BRI; DNQ	CAL												NA	-	
2004	Front Row Motorsports	92	Ford																										RCH; DNQ	NHA	DOV	TAL	KAN	CLT						NA	-	
2004	W. W. Motorsports	94	Ford																																MAR; DNQ	ATL	PHO	DAR	HOM	NA	-	
2005	Kirk Shelmerdine Racing	27	Ford	DAY	CAL	LVS	ATL	BRI; DNQ	MAR	TEX	PHO	TAL	DAR	RCH	CLT	DOV	POC	MCH	SON	DAY	CHI	NHA	POC	IND	GLN	MCH	BRI	CAL	RCH	NHA	DOV	TAL	KAN	CLT	MAR	ATL	TEX	PHO	HOM	NA	-	
^{†} – Qualified but replaced by Mickey Gibbs

===== Daytona 500 =====
Year	Team	Manufacturer	Start	Finish
1982	Henderson Motorsports	Chevrolet	DNQ	
1988	Bob Clark Motorsports	Oldsmobile	33	21
1989	Arrington Racing	Pontiac	QL^{†}	
1991	Ball Motorsports	Chevrolet	DNQ	
1992	Ball Motorsports	Chevrolet	DNQ	
1993	Ball Motorsports	Chevrolet	DNQ	
1994	Jimmy Means Racing	Ford	DNQ	
^{†} - Qualified but replaced by Mickey Gibbs

==== Xfinity Series ====
NASCAR Xfinity Series results
Year	Team	No.	Make	1	2	3	4	5	6	7	8	9	10	11	12	13	14	15	16	17	18	19	20	21	22	23	24	25	26	27	28	29	30	31	32	33	34	35	NXSC	Pts	Ref
1982	Henderson Motorsports	15	Pontiac	DAY	RCH	BRI; 5	MAR	DAR	HCY	SBO	CRW	RCH	LGY	DOV	HCY	CLT	ASH	HCY	SBO	CAR	CRW	SBO	HCY	LGY	IRP	BRI	HCY	RCH	MAR	CLT	HCY	MAR							107th	155	
1983	Henderson Motorsports	3	Pontiac	DAY	RCH	CAR	HCY	MAR	NWS	SBO	GPS	LGY	DOV	BRI	CLT	SBO	HCY	ROU	SBO	ROU	CRW	ROU	SBO	HCY	LGY	IRP	GPS	BRI	HCY	DAR	RCH	NWS	SBO	MAR	ROU	CLT	HCY	MAR; 26	133rd	85	
1984	Brad Teague	38	Pontiac	DAY	RCH	CAR	HCY	MAR; 8	DAR	ROU	NSV; 5	LGY	MLW	DOV	CLT	SBO; 10	HCY; 2	ROU	SBO; 6	ROU	HCY; 2	IRP	LGY	SBO	BRI; 20	DAR	RCH	NWS; 4	CLT	HCY; 7	CAR	MAR; 28							30th	1097	
1985	Henderson Motorsports	75	Pontiac	DAY; 30	CAR; 12	HCY; 16	BRI; 27	MAR; 23	DAR; 2	SBO; 14	LGY; 6	DOV; 25	CLT; 28	SBO; 7	HCY; 14	ROU; 22	IRP; 30	SBO; 20	LGY	**HCY**; 13	MLW	BRI; 22	DAR; 3	RCH; 20	NWS; 8	ROU	CLT; 7	**HCY**; 9	CAR; 15	MAR; 21									13th	2772	
1986	Henderson Motorsports	75	Pontiac	DAY; 29	CAR; 7	HCY; 6	MAR; 7	BRI; 3	DAR; 6	SBO; 12	LGY; 13	JFC; 11	DOV; 7	CLT; 7	SBO; 12	HCY; 11	ROU; 8	IRP; 10	SBO; 17	RAL	OXF	SBO					DAR; 8	RCH	DOV	MAR	ROU	CLT; 35	CAR	MAR					19th	2502	
1986	Henderson Motorsports	75	Chevy																				HCY; 22	LGY	ROU	BRI; 11													19th	2502	
1987	Henderson Motorsports	75	Pontiac	DAY; 7			DAR; 12				CLT; 17	DOV; 10							RAL; 9			BRI; 12		DAR; 17		DOV; 8		CLT; 11	CAR; 14	MAR; 9									7th	3331	
1987	Henderson Motorsports	75	Chevy		HCY; 15	MAR; 1*		BRI; 18	LGY; 13	SBO; 6			IRP; 29	ROU; 18	JFC; 9	OXF; 23	SBO; 20	HCY; 12		LGY; 11	ROU; 9		JFC; 9		RCH; 28		MAR; 24												7th	3331	
1988	Henderson Motorsports	75	Olds	DAY; 40		CAR; 29		DAR; 34	BRI; 10	LNG	NZH; 12	SBO	NSV	CLT; 34	DOV; 5	ROU	LAN	LVL	MYB; 8	OXF	SBO	HCY	LNG	IRP	ROU	BRI; 11	DAR; 10	RCH	DOV; 11*	MAR; 32	CLT; 39	CAR; 18	MAR; 8						23rd	1781	
1988	Speedway Motorsports	56	Buick		HCY; 20																																		23rd	1781	
1988		1	Buick				MAR; 14																																23rd	1781	
1989	Pharo Racing	33	Olds	DAY; 18	CAR	MAR	HCY	DAR; 36	BRI	NZH; 36	SBO	LAN	NSV	CLT; 4	DOV; 34	ROU	LVL	VOL	MYB	SBO	HCY	DUB	IRP	ROU	BRI	DAR	RCH	DOV											48th	549	
1989	Ryder Racing	27	Pontiac																										MAR; 18	CLT	CAR	MAR							48th	549	
1990	Henderson Motorsports	75	Olds	DAY; 31	RCH	CAR; 24	MAR	HCY	DAR; 15	BRI	LAN; 16	SBO; 22	NZH	HCY	CLT	DOV	ROU	VOL	MYB	OXF	NHA	SBO																	49th	609	
1990		0	Olds																				DUB; 15	IRP	ROU	BRI	DAR	RCH	DOV	MAR	CLT	NHA	CAR	MAR					49th	609	
1991	Teague-Weiss Racing	38	Olds	DAY; 26	RCH	CAR	MAR	VOL	HCY	DAR	BRI; QL^{†}	LAN	SBO	NZH	CLT	DOV	ROU	HCY	MYB	GLN	OXF	NHA	SBO	DUB	IRP	ROU	BRI	DAR	RCH	DOV	CLT; DNQ	NHA	CAR	MAR					98th	85	
1995	Henderson Motorsports	5	Chevy	DAY	CAR	RCH	ATL	NSV	DAR	BRI; 7	HCY	NHA	NZH	CLT	DOV	MYB	GLN	MLW	TAL	SBO	IRP	MCH	BRI; 20	DAR	RCH	DOV	CLT	CAR	HOM										65th	249	
1996	Henderson Motorsports	5	Ford	DAY	CAR	RCH	ATL	NSV	DAR	BRI; 32	HCY	NZH	CLT	DOV	SBO	MYB	GLN	MLW	NHA	TAL	IRP	MCH																	62nd	246	
1996	Henderson Motorsports	77	Ford																				BRI; 19																62nd	246	
1996	Henderson Motorsports	75	Ford																					DAR; 30	RCH	DOV	CLT	CAR	HOM										62nd	246	
1997	Henderson Motorsports	15	Ford	DAY	CAR	RCH	ATL	LVS	DAR	HCY	TEX	BRI; 22	NSV	TAL	NHA	NZH	CLT	DOV	SBO	GLN	MLW																		55th	485	
1997	PRW Racing	77	Ford																			MYB; 34	GTY; 13	IRP; 20	MCH	BRI; 21	DAR	RCH	DOV	CLT	CAL	CAR	HOM						55th	485	
1999	PRW Racing	77	Ford	DAY	CAR	LVS	ATL	DAR	TEX	NSV	BRI	TAL	CAL	NHA	RCH	NZH	CLT	DOV	SBO	GLN	MLW	MYB	PPR	GTY	IRP	MCH	BRI; 18	DAR	RCH	DOV	CLT	CAR	MEM	PHO	HOM				105th	109	
2000	Jay Robinson Racing	49	Chevy	DAY	CAR	LVS	ATL	DAR	BRI; DNQ	TEX	NSV	TAL	CAL	RCH	NHA	CLT	DOV	SBO	MYB	GLN	MLW	NZH	PPR	GTY	IRP	MCH	BRI	DAR	RCH	DOV	CLT	CAR	MEM	PHO	HOM				NA	-	
2001	Means Racing	52	Ford	DAY	CAR	LVS	ATL; 43	DAR; 40													GLN; 38	CHI								DOV; 41	KAN	CLT			CAR; 42	HOM			47th	754	
2001	Henderson Motorsports	75	Chevy						BRI; 32	TEX	NSH	TAL	CAL	RCH	NHA																								47th	754	
2001	PRW Racing	77	Ford													NZH; 34	CLT; 40	DOV; 35	KEN; 40	MLW; 39			GTY; 37	PPR	IRP; 38	MCH	BRI; 36	DAR; 40	RCH				MEM; 43	PHO					47th	754	
2002	Means Racing	52	Ford	DAY	CAR; 41	LVS	DAR; 42	BRI; 43			TAL; 42	CAL	RCH; 42	NHA; 40	NZH; 38	CLT					DAY; 43	CHI		PPR; 42				DAR; 42	RCH	DOV	KAN	CLT	MEM	ATL	CAR	PHO; 43	HOM		42nd	1066	
2002	Moy Racing	77	Ford						TEX; 35	NSH; 24							DOV; 26	NSH; 28	KEN; 28	MLW			GTY; 29				BRI; 25												42nd	1066	
2002	Davis Motorsports	0	Chevy																						IRP; 24	MCH													42nd	1066	
2003	Means Racing	52	Ford	DAY; DNQ						TAL; 33		CAL; DNQ								MLW; DNQ	DAY; 42		NHA; 39		IRP; 40			DAR; QL^{‡}	RCH; 41		KAN; 41	CLT; DNQ	MEM; 37			CAR; DNQ	HOM		32nd	1647	
2003	Moy Racing	77	Ford		CAR; 29	LVS	DAR; 23	BRI; 30	TEX		NSH; 23		RCH; 23	GTY; 37	NZH; 25	CLT; 39		NSH; 37	KEN; 33							MCH; 33	BRI; 20	DAR; 24		DOV; 30				ATL; 27	PHO; 34				32nd	1647	
2003	Tennessee Mountain Boys Racing	53	Pontiac														DOV; 36																						32nd	1647	
2003	Tennessee Mountain Boys Racing	53	Chevy																			CHI; 35																	32nd	1647	
2003	Davis Motorsports	70	Chevy																					PPR; 34															32nd	1647	
2004	Tennessee Mountain Boys Racing	53	Pontiac	DAY	CAR; 41	LVS																																	47th	780	
2004	Means Racing	52	Ford				DAR; 42	BRI; 26										NSH; 42	KEN; DNQ	MLW; 36			NHA; 40		IRP; DNQ	MCH	BRI; DNQ	CAL	RCH; 40	DOV; 40	KAN; DNQ	CLT; DNQ	MEM	ATL	PHO; DNQ	DAR; 43	HOM		47th	780	
2004	Jay Robinson Racing	39	Ford						TEX; DNQ																														47th	780	
2004	Tennessee Mountain Boys Racing	53	Chevy							NSH; 42	TAL		GTY; DNQ																										47th	780	
2004	Moy Racing	77	Ford									CAL; 39		RCH; DNQ	NZH; 31	CLT; 28	DOV; 30																						47th	780	
2004	Davis Motorsports	0	Chevy																		DAY; DNQ	CHI		PPR; 35															47th	780	
2005	Means Racing	52	Ford	DAY	CAL	MXC	LVS	ATL	NSH	BRI; DNQ	TEX	PHO	TAL	DAR	RCH	CLT	DOV		KEN; DNQ										BRI; DNQ	CAL	RCH	DOV	KAN	CLT					128th	68	
2005	Tennessee Mountain Boys Racing	53	Chevy															NSH; DNQ								IRP; DNQ	GLN	MCH											128th	68	
2005	GIC-Mixon Motorsports	24	Chevy																	MLW; 43	DAY	CHI	NHA; 43	PPR; DNQ	GTY														128th	68	
2005	Tri-City Motorsports	91	Ford																																MEM; DNQ	TEX	PHO	HOM	128th	68	
2006	Day Enterprise Racing	05	Chevy	DAY	CAL	MXC	LVS	ATL	BRI; DNQ	TEX	NSH	PHO	TAL	RCH	DAR	CLT	DOV	NSH	KEN	MLW; 38	DAY	CHI	NHA	MAR	GTY; DNQ	IRP	GLN	MCH	BRI	CAL	RCH	DOV	KAN	CLT	MEM	TEX	PHO	HOM	137th	49	
2007	Means Racing	52	Ford	DAY; DNQ	CAL	MXC	LVS	ATL	BRI; 40	NSH; 39	TEX	PHO	TAL	RCH	DAR	CLT		NSH; 42	KEN					GTY; 40	IRP; 42	CGV	GLN	MCH		CAL; 40	RCH	DOV	KAN	CLT	MEM	TEX	PHO	HOM	91st	295	
2007	Day Enterprise Racing	05	Chevy														DOV; 42																						91st	295	
2007	Faith Motorsports	89	Ford																	MLW; 39	NHA	DAY	CHI																91st	295	
2007	Fridel-Carter Motorsports	54	Chevy																										BRI; DNQ										91st	295	
2008	Means Racing	55	Ford	DAY	CAL	LVS	ATL	BRI	NSH; 41	TEX	PHO	MXC	TAL	RCH																									48th	1020	
2008	Means Racing	52	Chevy												DAR; 22	CLT; 28		NSH; 27	KEN; 27	MLW; 30	NHA; 28		CHI; QL^{¤}	GTY; 23	IRP; 29	CGV	GLN	MCH	BRI; 32	CAL	RCH; 32	DOV	KAN	CLT				HOM; 40	48th	1020	
2008	Means Racing	55	Chevy														DOV; 37																						48th	1020	
2008	JD Motorsports	0	Chevy																			DAY; 43																	48th	1020	
2008	Means Racing	52	Ford																																MEM; 36	TEX	PHO		48th	1020	
2009	Means Racing	55	Ford	DAY	CAL	LVS	BRI; DNQ	TEX																															117th	128	
2009	Means Racing	52	Chevy						NSH; DNQ	PHO	TAL	RCH	DAR	CLT	DOV	NSH	KEN	MLW	NHA	DAY	CHI	GTY; DNQ	IRP	IOW	GLN	MCH	BRI; 34	CGV	ATL	RCH					MEM; DNQ	TEX	PHO	HOM	117th	128	
2009	Means Racing	52	Ford																												DOV; 32	KAN	CAL	CLT					117th	128	
2010	JD Motorsports	04	Chevy	DAY; 42	CAL	LVS	BRI; DNQ	NSH	PHO	TEX	TAL	RCH	DAR	DOV	CLT	NSH	KEN	ROA	NHA	DAY	CHI	GTY	IRP	IOW	GLN	MCH													121st	86	
2010	JD Motorsports	0	Chevy																								BRI; 38	CGV	ATL	RCH	DOV	KAN	CAL	CLT	GTY	TEX	PHO	HOM	121st	86	
2011	Jay Robinson Racing	49	Chevy	DAY	PHO	LVS	BRI; 42	CAL	TEX	TAL	NSH	RCH	DAR		IOW; 38	CLT	CHI	MCH	ROA	DAY	KEN	NHA	NSH	IRP	IOW	GLN	CGV	BRI	ATL	RCH	CHI	DOV	KAN	CLT	TEX	PHO	HOM		81st	13	
2011	JD Motorsports	0	Chevy											DOV; 39																									81st	13	
2012	JD Motorsports	4	Chevy	DAY	PHO	LVS	BRI; 32	CAL	TEX	RCH	TAL	DAR	IOW	CLT	DOV; 25	MCH	ROA	KEN	DAY	NHA	CHI	IND	IOW	GLN	CGV	BRI; 26	ATL	RCH	CHI	KEN	DOV; 28	CLT	KAN	TEX	PHO	HOM			51st	65	
2013	NEMCO-Jay Robinson Racing	70	Toyota	DAY	PHO	LVS	BRI; 29	CAL	TEX	RCH	TAL	DAR	CLT	DOV	IOW	MCH	ROA	KEN	DAY	NHA	CHI	IND	IOW	GLN	MOH	BRI; 32	ATL	RCH	CHI	KEN	DOV; 33	KAN	CLT	TEX	PHO	HOM			62nd	38	
2015	MBM Motorsports	13	Toyota	DAY	ATL	LVS	PHO	CAL	TEX	BRI	RCH	TAL	IOW	CLT	DOV	MCH	CHI	DAY	KEN	NHA	IND	IOW	GLN	MOH	BRI; 26	ROA	DAR	RCH	CHI	KEN	DOV	CLT	KAN	TEX	PHO	HOM			71st	18	
^{†} - Qualified but replaced by Steve Grissom · ^{‡} - Qualified for Mike Potter · ^{¤} - Qualified but replaced by Kevin Lepage

==== Craftsman Truck Series ====
NASCAR Craftsman Truck Series results
Year	Team	No.	Make	1	2	3	4	5	6	7	8	9	10	11	12	13	14	15	16	17	18	19	20	21	22	23	24	25	26	27	NCTC	Pts	Ref
1997	Gerald Voyles	91	Chevy	WDW	TUS	HOM	PHO	POR	EVG	I70	NHA	TEX	BRI; 13	NZH	MLW	LVL	CNS	HPT	IRP	FLM											50th	409	
1997	M-R Motorsports	04	Chevy																		NSV; 25	GLN	RCH; 24	MAR; 19	SON	MMR	CAL	PHO	LVS		50th	409	
1998	M-R Motorsports	04	Chevy	WDW	HOM	PHO	POR	EVG	I70	GLN	TEX	BRI; 19	MLW	NZH	CAL	PPR	IRP	NHA	FLM	NSV	HPT	LVL	RCH	MEM	GTY	MAR; 17	SON	MMR	PHO	LVS	62nd	218	
2000	M-R Motorsports	04	Chevy	DAY; DNQ	HOM	PHO	MMR	MAR	PIR	GTY	MEM	PPR	EVG	TEX	KEN	GLN	MLW	NHA	NZH	MCH	IRP	NSV	CIC	RCH	DOV	TEX	CAL				NA	-	
2003	Team Racing	86	Chevy	DAY	DAR	MMR	MAR	CLT	DOV	TEX	MEM	MLW	KAN	KEN	GTW	MCH	IRP	NSH	BRI; 16	RCH	NHA	CAL	LVS	SBO	TEX	MAR	PHO	HOM			98th	115	
2004	Paul Brown	90	Ford	DAY	ATL	MAR	MFD	CLT	DOV	TEX	MEM	MLW	KAN	KEN	GTW	MCH	IRP	NSH	BRI; 34	RCH	NHA	LVS									76th	143	
2004	RAW Racing	72	Chevy																				CAL; 27	TEX	MAR	PHO; DNQ	DAR	HOM			76th	143	

=== ARCA Permatex SuperCar Series ===
(key) (Bold – Pole position awarded by qualifying time. Italics – Pole position earned by points standings or practice time. * – Most laps led.)

ARCA Permatex SuperCar Series results
Year	Team	No.	Make	1	2	3	4	5	6	7	8	9	10	11	12	13	14	15	16	17	APSC	Pts	Ref
1985	Henderson Motorsports	75	Pontiac	ATL	DAY	ATL	TAL	ATL	SSP	IRP; 30	CSP	FRS	IRP	OEF	ISF	DSF	TOL				128th	-	
1987	Ball Motorsports	60	Chevy	DAY	ATL; 10	TAL	DEL	ACS	TOL	ROC	POC	FRS	KIL	TAL	FRS	ISF	INF	DSF	SLM	ATL	118th	-	
