= Elbert L. Kinser =

US Medal of Honor recipient

Elbert Luther Kinser
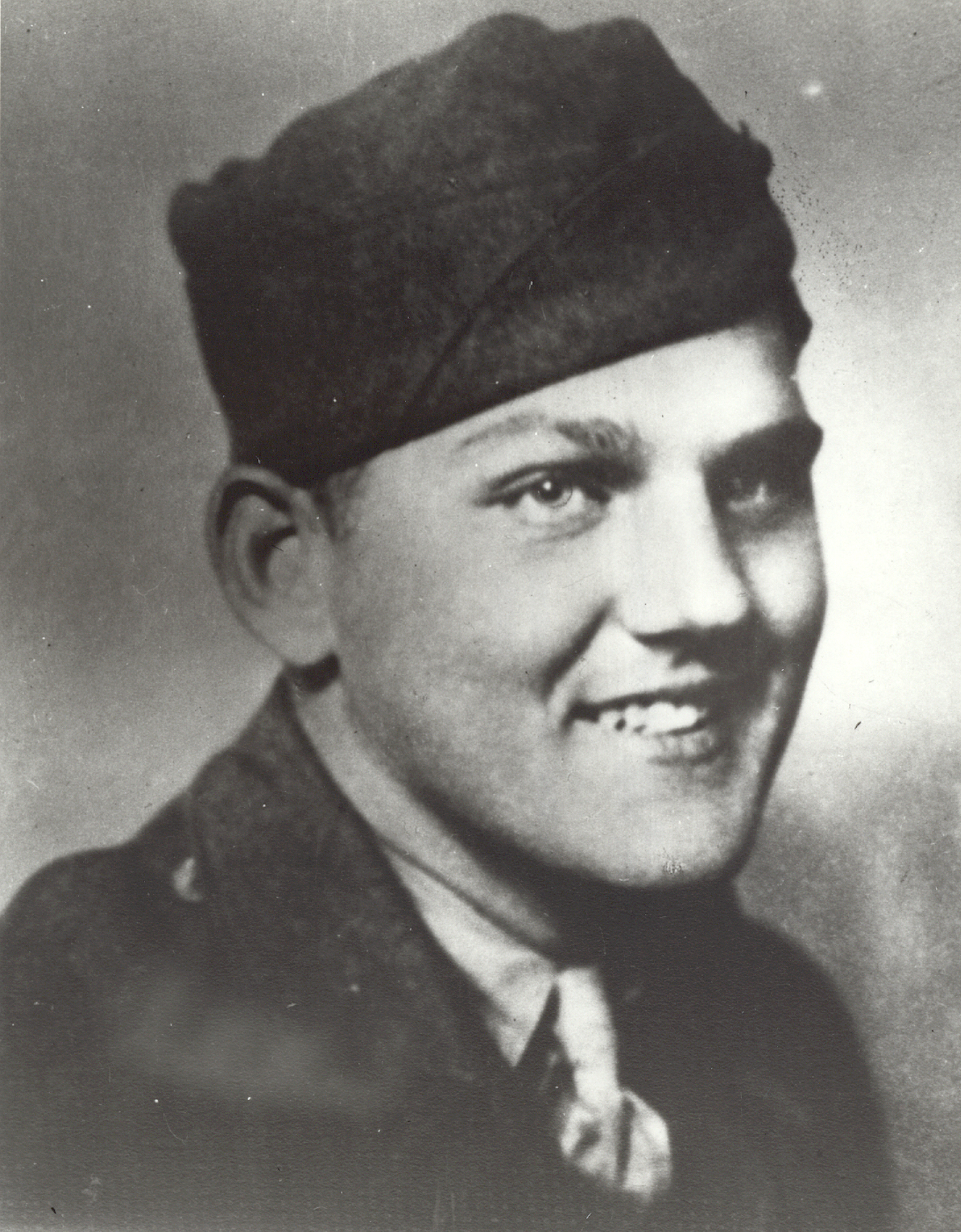
- Elbert L. Kinser, Medal of Honor recipient
- Born: October 21, 1922; Greeneville, Tennessee, US
- Died: May 4, 1945 (aged 22); Okinawa, Japan
- Burial place: initially the 1st Marine Division Cemetery on Okinawa later Solomon Lutheran Cemetery Greeneville, Tennessee
- Military career
- Allegiance: United States
- Branch: United States Marine Corps
- Service years: 1942–1945
- Rank: Sergeant
- Units: Company I, 3rd Battalion, 1st Marines, 1st Marine Division
- Conflicts: World War II: Battle of Cape Gloucester; Battle of Peleliu; Battle of Okinawa †
- Awards: Medal of Honor; Purple Heart

Sergeant Elbert Luther Kinser (October 21, 1922 – May 4, 1945) was a United States Marine who sacrificed his life at the Battle of Okinawa during World War II. He threw himself on a grenade, absorbing the explosion with his body and protecting his men, for which he received the Medal of Honor. It was presented to his parents on July 4, 1946, in Greeneville, Tennessee.

== Early years ==
Elbert Kinser was born in Greeneville, Tennessee on October 21, 1922. He worked on his father's farm prior to joining the Marine Corps.

== Marine Corps service ==
Kinser enlisted in the United States Marine Corps in December 1942 and received his recruit training at Marine Corps Recruit Depot Parris Island, South Carolina.

He sailed from the United States in March 1943, and joined the 7th Replacement Battalion in Pago Pago, Tutuila, American Samoa. Later, that battalion joined the 1st Marine Division in Melbourne, Australia, and Sgt Kinser was assigned to Company I, 1st Marines.

Action with the 1st Marines followed at Cape Gloucester, New Britain in Operation Cartwheel, and later at Battle of Peleliu in Peleliu, Palau Islands.

On Easter Sunday, April 1, 1945, Sgt Kinser landed with his unit on the Japanese island Okinawa. There Sergeant Kinser, acting as a leader of a rifle platoon, serving with Company I, 3rd Battalion, 1st Marines, 1st Marine Division, was subsequently killed in action on May 4, 1945. During a hand grenade battle, a Japanese grenade landed in the immediate vicinity, Kinser unhesitatingly threw himself on the deadly grenade, absorbing the full charge of the shattering explosion in his own body and thereby protecting his men from serious injury and possible death. This won him the nation's highest military decoration.

Sergeant Kinser was buried in the 1st Marine Division Cemetery on Okinawa and his remains were returned to the United States in early 1949 for burial. His final resting place is the Solomon Lutheran Cemetery in Greeneville, Tennessee.

== Medal of Honor citation ==
=== Medal of Honor citation ===
The President of the United States takes pride in presenting the MEDAL OF HONOR to SERGEANT ELBERT L. KINSER UNITED STATES MARINE CORPS RESERVE for service as set forth in the following citation:

For conspicuous gallantry and intrepidity at the risk of his life above and beyond the call of duty while acting as Leader of a Rifle Platoon, serving with Company I, Third Battalion, First Marines, First Marine Division, in action against Japanese forces on Okinawa Shima in the Ryūkyū Chain, May 4, 1945. Taken under sudden, close attack by hostile troops entrenched on the reverse slope while moving up a strategic ridge along which his platoon was holding newly won positions, Sergeant Kinser engaged the enemy in a fierce hand grenade battle. Quick to act when a Japanese grenade landed in the immediate vicinity, Sergeant Kinser unhesitatingly threw himself on the deadly missile, absorbing the full charge of the shattering explosion in his own body and thereby protecting his men from serious injury and possible death. Stouthearted and indomitable, he had yielded his own chance of survival that his comrades might live to carry on the relentless battle against a fanatic enemy. His courage, cool decision and valiant spirit of self-sacrifice in the face of certain death sustained and enhanced the highest traditions of the United States Naval Service. He gallantly gave his life for his country.

HARRY S. TRUMAN

== Awards and decorations ==

1st row	Medal of Honor		
2nd row	Purple Heart	Combat Action Ribbon	Presidential Unit Citation
3rd row	American Campaign Medal	Asiatic-Pacific Campaign Medal with three campaign stars	World War II Victory Medal

== Memorials ==
In Kinser's home county of Greene County, Tennessee several things are named in his honor. Downtown Greeneville, Tennessee has a historical marker about Kinser, south of Greeneville is Kinser Park and in the city of Tusculum a bridge over the Nolichucky River on Tennessee State Route 107 is named in his honor. The bridge collapsed following flooding from Hurricane Helene. On May 23, 2025 the bridge was reopened and a ceremony dedicated to Kinser was hosted. Camp Kinser, A Marine Corps installation at Urasoe on Okinawa Island was named after him.

== See also ==
- List of Medal of Honor recipients
- List of Medal of Honor recipients for World War II
