= Mike Nease =

American football player (born 1961)

No. 78
- Position: Guard

Personal information
- Born: October 30, 1961 (age 65); Morristown, Tennessee, U.S.
- Listed height: 6 ft 3 in (1.91 m)
- Listed weight: 272 lb (123 kg)

Career information
- High school: South Greene (Greenville, Tennessee)
- College: Chattanooga (1980–1983)
- NFL draft: 1984: undrafted

Career history
- Cleveland Browns (1984)*; Oklahoma Outlaws (1984)*; Los Angeles Express (1985)*; Denver Gold (1985); Philadelphia Eagles (1987); New England Steamrollers (1988)
- * Offseason or practice squad member only

Career NFL statistics
- Games played: 2
- Stats at Pro Football Reference

Michael Ray Nease (born October 30, 1961) is an American former professional football player who was a guard for the Philadelphia Eagles of the National Football League (NFL). He played college football for the Chattanooga Mocs, winning the Jacobs Blocking Trophy. He also played in the United States Football League (USFL) for the Denver Gold, and had stints in the USFL with the Oklahoma Outlaws and Los Angeles Express and in the NFL with the Cleveland Browns. He concluded his career with the New England Steamrollers of the Arena Football League (AFL) in 1988.
