= Tiger Valley, Tennessee =

Unincorporated community in Tennessee, US

Coordinates: 36°13′42″N 82°11′11″W

Tiger Valley is an unincorporated community in Carter County, Tennessee that is located on Tennessee State Route 173 at its junction with U.S. Route 19E. Tiger Valley is located south of Elizabethton, the county seat of Carter County, and north of Roan Mountain.
