= Horse Creek, Tennessee =

Unincorporated community in Tennessee, US

Coordinates: 36.16288°N 82.66320°W

Horse Creek (also Horsecreek) is an unincorporated community in southeastern Greene County, Tennessee. Horse Creek is located southeast of Tusculum.

Horse Creek is the location of Horse Creek Recreation Area, a Cherokee National Forest recreation area.

== 2011 tornado ==
Horse Creek along with Camp Creek were hit with 2 EF-3 tornadoes on April 27, 2011.

== Notable people ==
- Christian Burgner ( 1811-1886 ) Master cabinet maker and wood worker. Born in Horse Creek September, 13. Son of Peter Burgner ( 1773-1824 ). Christian married Malinda Elizabeth Fullen ( 1822-1901 ). They had 10 children.
- John Calvin Burgner ( 1797-1863 ) Master Cabinet maker and woodworker. Brother of Christian Burgner. Born in Woodstock, Virginia October, 30.
- Park Overall (1957-) Actress
