= Newmansville, Tennessee =

Unincorporated community in Tennessee, US

Coordinates: 36°16′44″N 82°45′34″W

Newmansville is an unincorporated community in northeast Greene County, Tennessee. Newmansville is located at the junction of Tennessee State Routes 93 and 351.

== Newmansville Volunteer Fire Department ==
The Newmansville Volunteer Fire Department serves Northeastern Greene County.
