= Erwin Cubs =

- 1943–1944; Erwin, Tennessee

Minor league affiliations
- Class: Class D (1943–1944)
- League: Appalachian League (1943–1944)

Major league affiliations
- Team: Chicago Cubs (1943–1944)

Minor league titles
- League titles (1): 1943

Team data
- Name: Erwin Cubs (1944); Erwin Aces (1943)
- Ballpark: Gentry Stadium (1943–1944)

The Erwin Cubs were a Minor League Baseball team that played in the Class D Appalachian League from 1943 to 1944. They were located in Erwin, Tennessee, and played their home games at Gentry Stadium. Known as the Erwin Aces in 1943, they became the Erwin Cubs in 1944 borrowing the moniker from the Chicago Cubs, with whom they were affiliated in both seasons. The Aces won the 1943 Appalachian League playoff championship.

== History ==
Erwin had previously been home to the Appalachian League's Erwin Mountaineers in 1940.

The Erwin Aces began play in 1943 as the Class D affiliate of the Chicago Cubs. They were managed by Jim Poole, a former American League first baseman who served as a player-manager. The Aces opened the season at home with a 27–11 loss to the Johnson City Cardinals on May 4 at Gentry Stadium. Erwin finished the season with an even 53–53 (.500) record, placing third. All four of the circuit's teams participated in the playoffs. The Aces advanced to the finals by beating Johnson City, three games to one, in the semifinals. They then defeated the Bristol Twins, 4–3, in a best-of-seven series to win the Appalachian League playoff championship.

In 1944, the team borrowed the nickname of their Major League Baseball affiliate by becoming the Erwin Cubs. Under Poole, Erwin finished the season with a 45–63 (.417) last-place record. Again, all four teams participated in the playoffs, but the Aces lost their semifinal series to Bristol, three games to one. They lost their final game, 3–2, at Bristol on September 3.

Across both seasons of play, Erwin accumulated a regular season record of 98–116 (.458).

== Season-by-season results ==
Season	Regular season				Postseason			MLB affiliate	Ref.
Season	Record	Win %	Finish	GB	Record	Win %	Result	MLB affiliate	Ref.
1943	53–53	.500	3rd	19 1/2	7–4	.636	Result	Won semifinal vs. Johnson City Cardinals, 3–1; Won Appalachian League championship vs. Bristol Twins, 4–3	Chicago Cubs
1944	45–63	.417	4th	17 1/2	1–3	.250	Lost semifinal vs. Bristol Twins, 3–1	Chicago Cubs	
Totals	98–116	.458	—	—	8–7	.533	—	—	—

== Notable players ==
Five Aces/Cubs also played in at least one game in Major League Baseball during their careers. These players and their seasons with Erwin were:

- Herman Fink (1943)
- Jim Poole (1943–1944)
- Dick Sipek (1943)
- Jim Pearce (1944)
- Rube Walker (1944)
