= Limestone Cove, Tennessee =

Unincorporated community in Tennessee, US

Coordinates: 36°10′51″N 82°15′42″W

Limestone Cove is an unincorporated community in Unicoi County, Tennessee. It is located at and around the junction of Tennessee State Routes 107 and 173.

== History ==
Limestone Cove was the site of a massacre during the American Civil War.

== Recreation ==
The Cherokee National Forest's Limestone Cove Recreation Area is located in Limestone Cove.
