= Blue Ridge (dishware) =

Brand of dishware manufactured in the United States

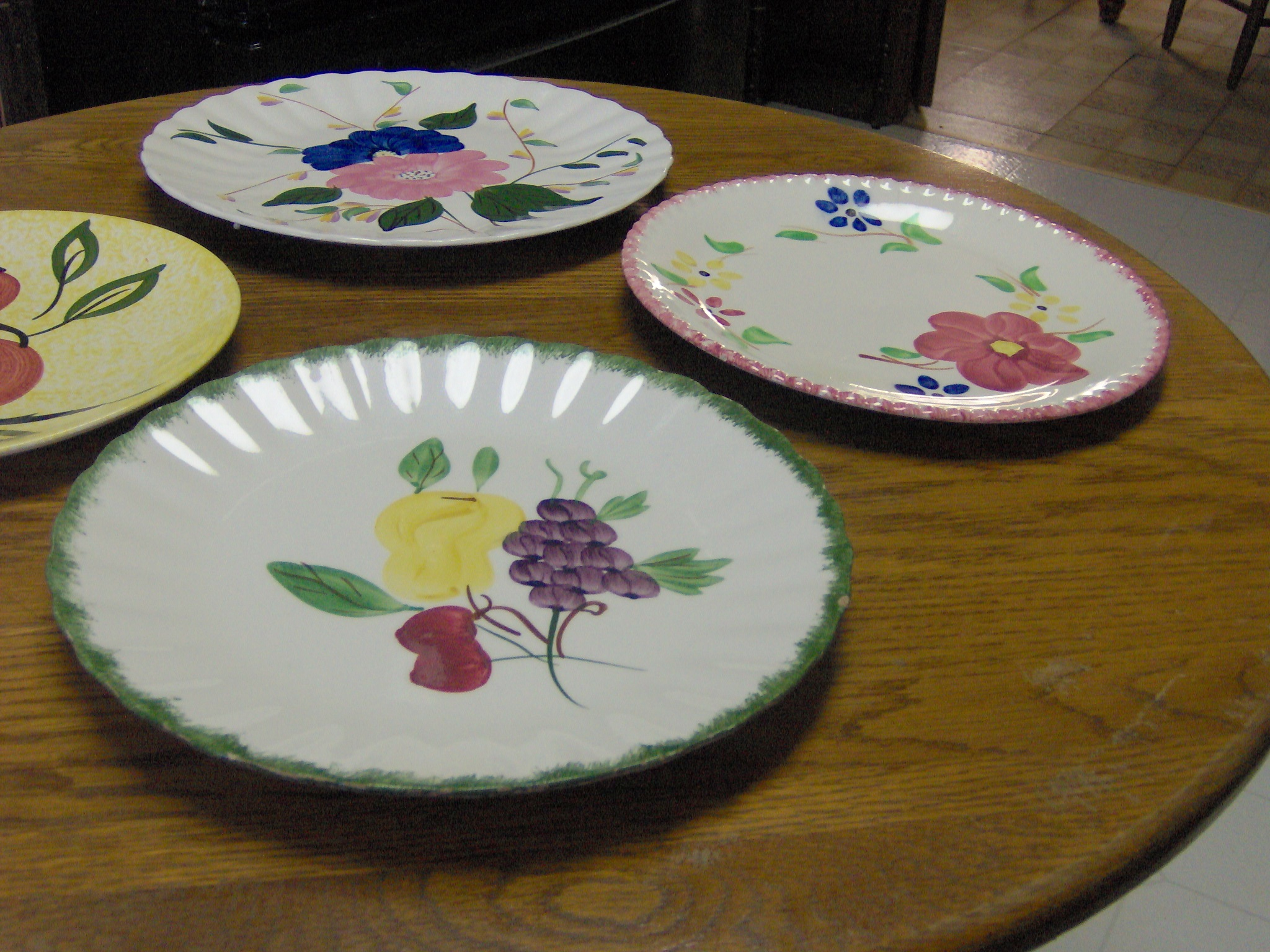
Blue Ridge china

Blue Ridge is a brand and range of American tableware (dishware) manufactured by Southern Potteries Incorporated from the 1930s until 1957. Well known in their day for their underglaze decoration and colorful patterns, Blue Ridge pieces are now popular items with collectors of antique dishware. The underglaze technique made the decorations more durable, and while basic patterns were reused consistently, the fact that each piece was hand-painted means that no two pieces are exactly alike.

Blue Ridge dishware is rooted in a pottery established in Erwin, Tennessee around 1916 at the behest of the Carolina, Clinchfield & Ohio Railroad and chartered as Southern Potteries Incorporated in 1920. During the late 1920s, under the guidance of Charles Foreman, Southern Potteries implemented its underglaze decoration technique, which it began stamping with "Blue Ridge Hand Painted Underglaze" and similar variations in the following decade. Blue Ridge's free-style decorations helped it stand out against competitors, most of whom used dull, decal-decorated dishes.

Although Southern Potteries eventually employed over 1,000 workers and had gained a foothold in major markets across the United States, the company was unable to overcome the onset of plastic dinnerware in the 1950s. The rise of various collectors' organizations in the 1980s helped make Blue Ridge a popular collectible item.

== History ==
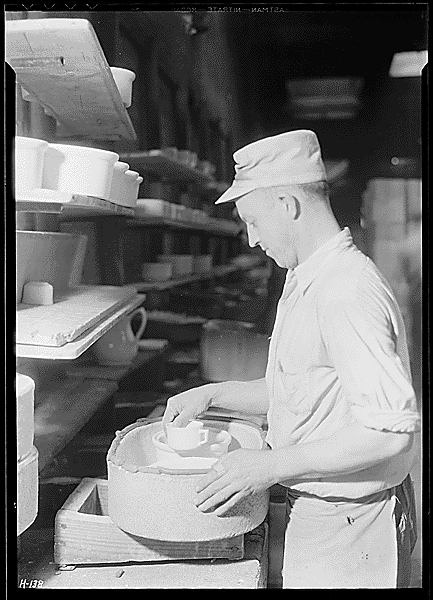
Kiln placer at Southern Potteries, photographed by Lewis Hine in 1933

The Carolina, Clinchfield & Ohio Railroad constructed a railroad line through the mountains of northeast Tennessee in the early 1900s. In an attempt to encourage industry along this line, they sold several acres of land along what is now Ohio Avenue in Erwin to several investors for the establishment of a pottery. The kaolinite and feldspar deposits in the adjacent hills made Erwin an ideal place for the manufacture of ceramics, and the pottery plant was likely in operation by late 1916. The plant initially had seven beehive kilns— four for glaze and decorator firing, and three for biscuit firing— and was surrounded by approximately forty houses for company employees.

The earliest dishware produced at the Erwin plant consisted of gold-trimmed, decal-decorated dishes stamped under the name "Clinchfield Potteries." In April 1920, the pottery was incorporated under the name "Southern Potteries, Incorporated." E.J. Owen, an associate of the Minerva, Ohio-based Owen China Company, was named the initial president of Southern Potteries, but, in 1922, the company was purchased by another Owen manager, Charles Foreman. Foreman expanded Southern Potteries in 1923, and within a few years replaced the coal-fired kilns with the newer oil-fired continuous-tunnel kilns, and introduced the underglaze painting technique. Dozens of local women were trained in the freehand painting process.

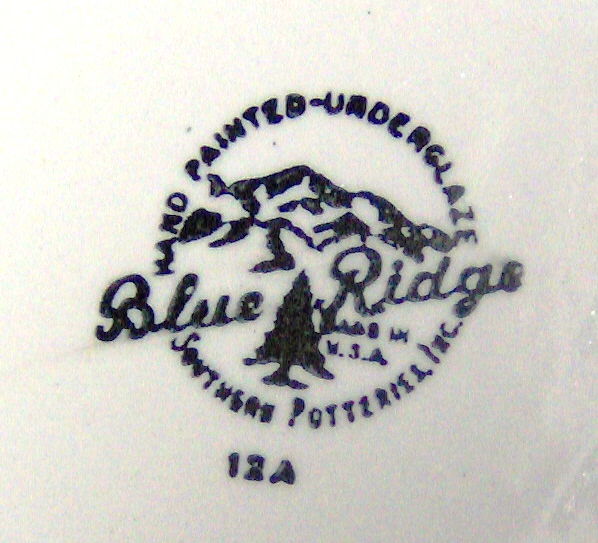
Blue Ridge stamp

Southern Potteries initially stamped its dishware pieces with the name "Southern Potteries," but in the 1930s had begun to use its now-famous "Blue Ridge" stamp, referring to the mountains surrounding Erwin. The bright, clear colors and uninhibited style of Blue Ridge dishware gave it an immediate edge over the rigid styles of decal-decorated dishware, and by 1938 Southern Potteries had transitioned entirely to a hand-painting operation. The plant employed 300 workers in 1940 and its dishware was being marketed in showrooms across the country, including storefronts at Chicago's Merchandise Mart and on Fifth Avenue in New York. Blue Ridge dishes were also featured in ads by Sears and Quaker Oats.

The outbreak of World War II halted the flow of imported pottery, and U.S. potteries drastically expanded to meet the sudden spike in demand. By the late-1940s, Southern Potteries employed over 1,000 workers and produced 324,000 hand-painted pieces per week, making it the largest hand-painted pottery in the United States. Imports returned in the early 1950s, however, and the rising popularity of plastic dinnerware began to take a toll on Southern Pottery's profits. The plant initially dropped employees' hours to half-time to avoid layoffs, but by 1956 had slashed its workforce to 600. In January 1957, the stockholders of Southern Potteries voted to close the plant and liquidate its assets. The plant was sold to a casket company, and the company's molds were sold to regional potters, most notably the Cash Family's Clinchfield Artware, and to Negatha Peterson, operating as Erwin Pottery.

== Manufacturing process ==
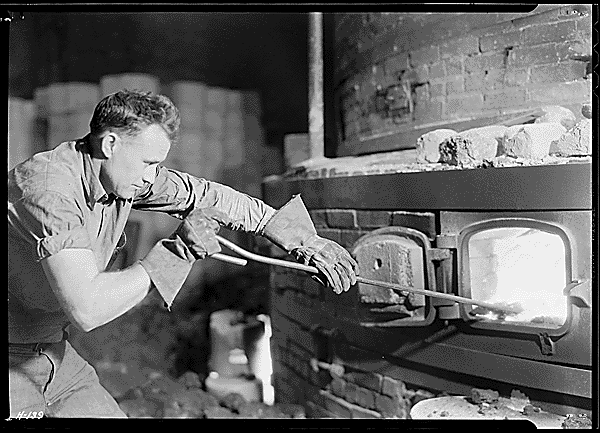
Kiln fireman at Southern Potteries, photographed by Lewis Hine in 1933

The Southern Potteries plant in Erwin covered 195,000 square feet (18,100 m^{2}), and consisted of a moulding department for flatware, a casting department, a finishing department, a stamping department, a decorating shop, and a shipping department. The process of creating Blue Ridge pieces began with the mixing of feldspar, talc, clay, flint, and water in a mixing machine to make a slip. The slip was then pumped into a filter press, creating a press cake. The press cake was remixed and formed into columns 6 feet (1.8 m) in diameter, which was in turn divided into 3-foot (0.91 m) lengths.

Some of these lengths were jiggered for flatware, and then sent to the potters for shaping. Others were cast for holloware (e.g. bowls, cups, pitchers), wherein the slip was poured into a plaster of Paris mold for shaping, fired in a 65-foot (20 m) pusher kiln, and sent to the finishing department for stamping, decorating, and glazing. Hand painting was usually done freehand. In later years, a faint outline was rubber-stamped onto the piece as a "coloring book style" guide. The painters usually consisted of a team of three or four who applied the pattern with brushes, sponges or rollers before glazing the ware and subjecting it to a second firing. The final products were shipped in wooden barrels which were made on site by the shipping department. Straw packing was obtained from local farms.

The most current pictorial guide to these pieces was published by John and Frances Ruffin in 2012, and includes pictures of some very collectible "lunch-time" pieces. These are pottery items, usually one-of-a-kind that were produced by employees on a very casual basis. The art quality varies from very basic to quite sophisticated.

== Collecting ==
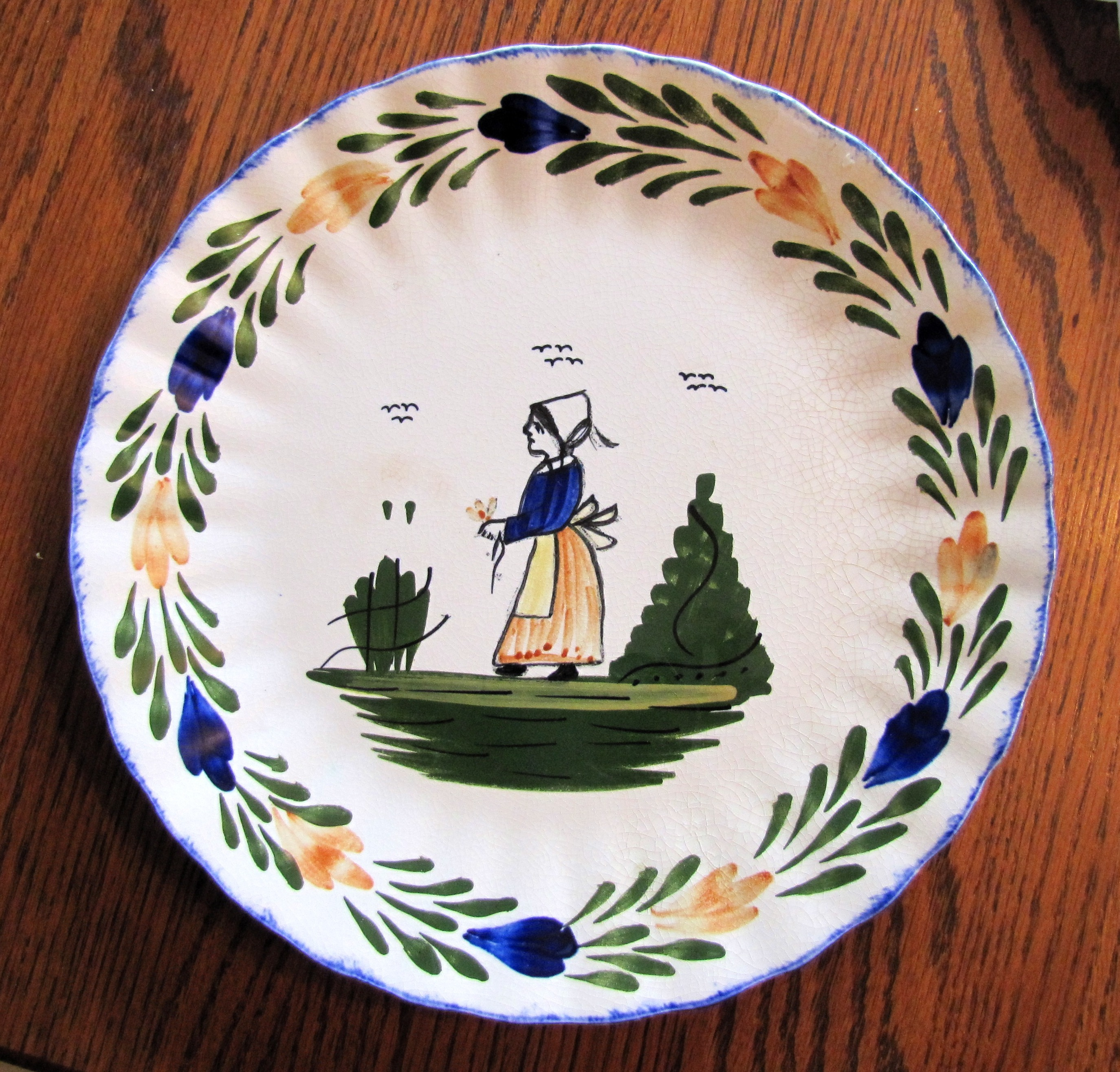
Blue Ridge piece with pattern

Although the plant closed in 1957, Blue Ridge dishware remained a popular collector's item throughout the 1960s and 1970s. In the early 1980s, the Blue Ridge Collectors Club was formed in Erwin, and began documenting the 4,000 or so patterns used by Southern Potteries over the years. The pottery plant did not produce open stock, but only made pieces to order. Patterns were numbered and some patterns were exclusive, for example Sears, and Quaker Oats. Pattern names were given to pieces as the newly re-discovered patterns were documented in the two major guide books, Ruffin and Newbound.

The plant would gladly accept small orders, perhaps for as few as two dozen pieces. The Erwin Kiwanis club had special plates made for one Christmas dinner. The china pieces, stamped with "Blue Ridge Handpainted Underglaze" or a similar variation, are the most popular items among Blue Ridge collectors. Pieces with patterns showing people, animals, or farm scenes are also popular (most pieces show floral patterns).

After lunch-time pieces, the rarest Blue Ridge pieces are limited edition artist-signed pieces, among them the "turkey hen" and "turkey gobbler" platters and the Paul Revere character jug. One of the most well-known Blue Ridge artists was chief designer and Erwin native Lena Watts. Other Southern Potteries artists who are known to have signed Blue Ridge pieces include Mae Garland, Frances Kyker, Ruby Hart, Nelsene Calhoun, Mildred Broyles, Alleene Miller, Louise Guinn, and Mildred Banner.
