= Camp Creek, Tennessee =

Unincorporated community in Tennessee, US

Coordinates: 36°05′14″N 82°45′50″W

Camp Creek is an unincorporated community in southern Greene County, Tennessee. Camp Creek is nestled at the foothills of the Appalachian Mountains sub-range the Bald Mountains.

== History ==
Camp Creek was recorded in land records as early as 1788. "For 10 pounds per 100 acres" – to Michael Box 150 acres in Greene County on south side of Nolichucky River on Camp Creek, both sides of Camp Creek, adjoining Thomas Davis, Lewis Morgan, David Reynolds. Samuel Johnston at Fairfield, 11 Jul 1788. From:

=== 2011 tornado ===
Camp Creek, along with neighboring Horse Creek, was hit by two EF3 tornadoes during the nighttime hours of April 27, 2011. A total of eight people were killed altogether by the tornadoes, which either damaged or destroyed hundreds of structures. The first tornado, which more closely affected Camp Creek, was spawned from the same long-tracked supercell that also produced an EF5 tornado near Philadelphia, Mississippi, an EF4 that affected Cordova and Blountsville, Alabama, an EF5 that moved through Rainsville, Alabama, and an EF4 that hit Ringgold, Georgia and Apison, Tennessee.

A Memorial honoring the victims was dedicated on April 28, 2012, one year after the tornado.

== Education ==
Camp Creek is home to Camp Creek Elementary School which serves grades K-5.

For Middle School, students attend South Greene Middle School in nearby Debusk, Tennessee.

For High School students go to South Greene High School in nearby South Greene.
