= Shallowford, Tennessee =

Unincorporated community in Tennessee, US

Coordinates: 36°05′57″N 82°28′15″W

Shallowford is an unincorporated community in Unicoi County, in the U.S. state of Tennessee.

== History ==
The community was named from after Shallowford Community Church. The sign on the hill reads, "where there is no vision the people will perish. It's a wonderful expanding community. There are many resources in the area for anyone needing support.
