= South Greene High School =

Location
- 7469 Asheville Highway; Greeneville, Tennessee, 37743; United States; 36.05261°N 82.85675°W

Information
- Type: Public high school
- Motto: Seeking Greatness, Honoring Success
- Principal: Lori Wilhoit
- Teaching staff: 36.23 (FTE)
- Grades: 9-12
- Enrollment: 548 (2023-2024)
- Student to teacher ratio: 13.47
- Colors: Maroon; Gray; White
- Mascot: Rebel
- Website: https://sghs.greenek12.org/

South Greene High School (SGHS) is a high school located south of Greeneville, Tennessee in the South Greene community. Established in 1965, it is part of the Greene County School System. South Greene High School's athletic teams are known as the Rebels.

== Feeder Schools ==
- Debusk Elementary (Formerly)
- Camp Creek Elementary
- Nolachucky Elementary
- South Greene Middle

== Awards ==
In 2011, South Greene High School was named as a Blue Ribbon School, an award that recognizes public and private elementary, middle, and high schools where students perform at very high levels or where significant improvements are being made in students' academic achievement.

For 2011–2012, South Greene High School was named a Tennessee Department of Education "Reward School". Reward Schools are the top 5 percent of schools in the state for performance or the top 5 percent for year-over-year progress. South Greene was awarded for both "performance" and "progress" categories, and is the only high school in Greene County or Greeneville City to have earned that honor.

== Notable alumni ==
- Mike Nease, former professional football player
