= Unicoi, Tennessee =

Unicoi
- Town
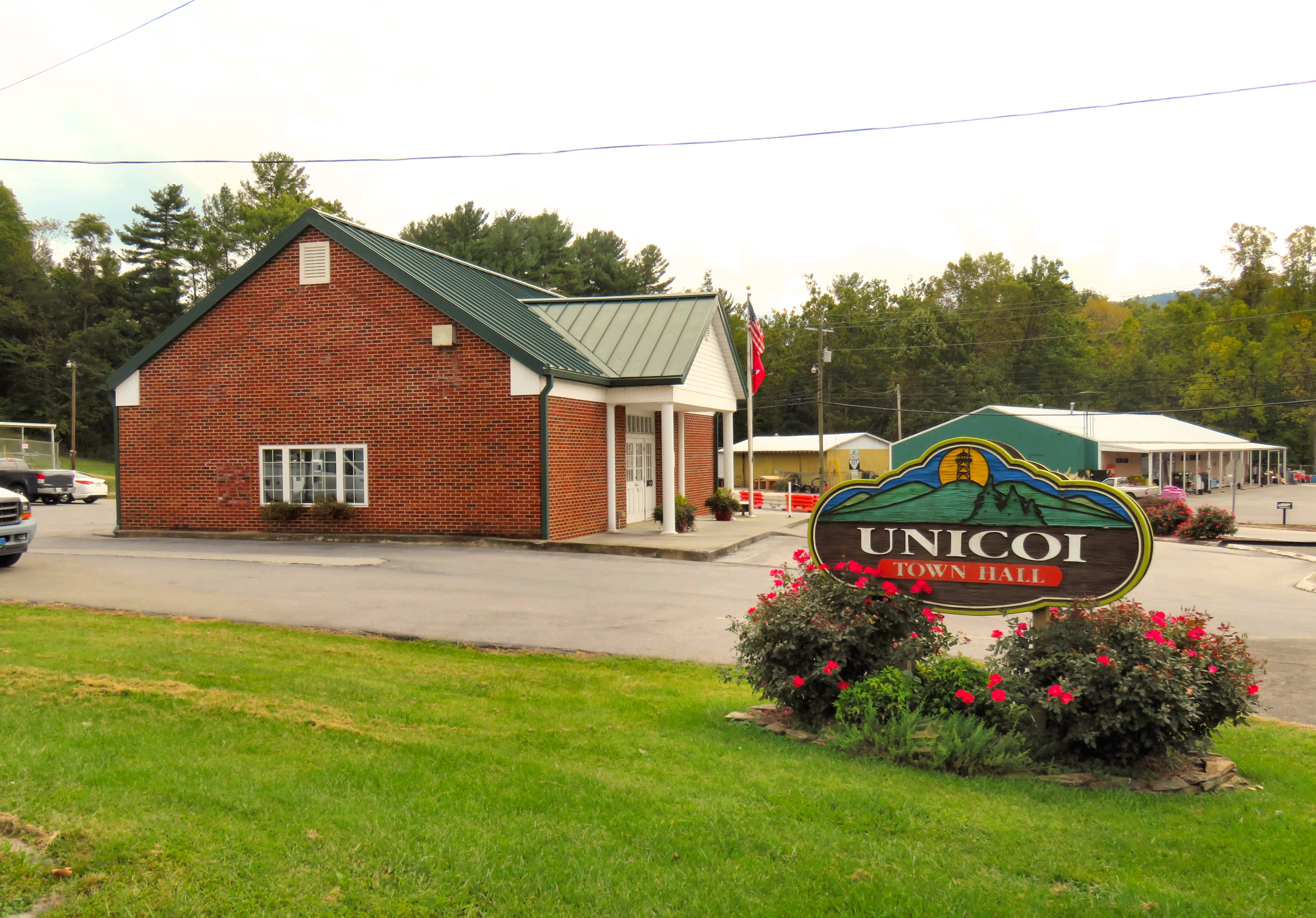
- Unicoi Town Hall

- Location of Unicoi in Unicoi County, Tennessee.
- Coordinates: 36°13′12″N 82°20′17″W
- Country: United States
- State: Tennessee
- County: Unicoi
- Incorporated: 1994
- Named for: Unaka, Cherokee for "white"

Area
  - Total: 16.19 sq mi (41.93 km^{2})
  - Land: 16.19 sq mi (41.93 km^{2})
  - Water: 0 sq mi (0.00 km^{2})
- Elevation: 1,923 ft (586 m)

Population (2020)
  - Total: 3,833
  - Density: 236.8/sq mi (91.41/km^{2})
- Time zone: UTC-5 (Eastern (EST))
  - Summer (DST): UTC-4 (EDT)
- ZIP code: 37692
- Area code: 423
- FIPS code: 47-75820
- GNIS feature ID: 1304219
- Website: www.unicoitn.net

Unicoi is a town in Unicoi County, Tennessee, United States. The population was 3,833 at the 2020 census. It is part of the Johnson City Metropolitan Statistical Area, which is a component of the Johnson City–Kingsport–Bristol Combined Statistical Area – commonly known as the "Tri-Cities" region.

== History ==
Unicoi was originally known as "Greasy Cove." In 1851, the Swingle brothers opened a post office in the community, and named it "Swingleville." In 1876, Dr. F.H. Hannum obtained control of the post office, and changed its name to "Limonite." When the railroads arrived in the valley in the late 1880s, the name was changed to "Unicoi City," and later shortened to its current form. The town developed in the early 20th century as a shipping point for area mining and logging operations. In 1994, the municipal government of Johnson City would purchase the Buffalo Valley Golf Course located in upper Unicoi County for $1.52 million. Residents of Unicoi speculated that the purchase was a sign of Johnson City seeking to begin annexations into Unicoi. As a result, a community group gathered to incorporate Unicoi into a town by public referendum vote the following year to prevent potential annexation.

== Geography ==
Unicoi is located at 36°13′12″N 82°20′17″W (36.220028, -82.338138). The town is situated in the North Indian Creek Valley (known locally as "The Valley Beautiful"), at a point where North Indian Creek emerges from the mountains to the southeast and bends to the southwest toward Erwin and its eventual confluence with the Nolichucky River. The northern portions of Unicoi are located in the headwaters of Buffalo Creek, which flows northeastward (in the opposite direction from North Indian Creek) and eventually empties into the Watauga River.

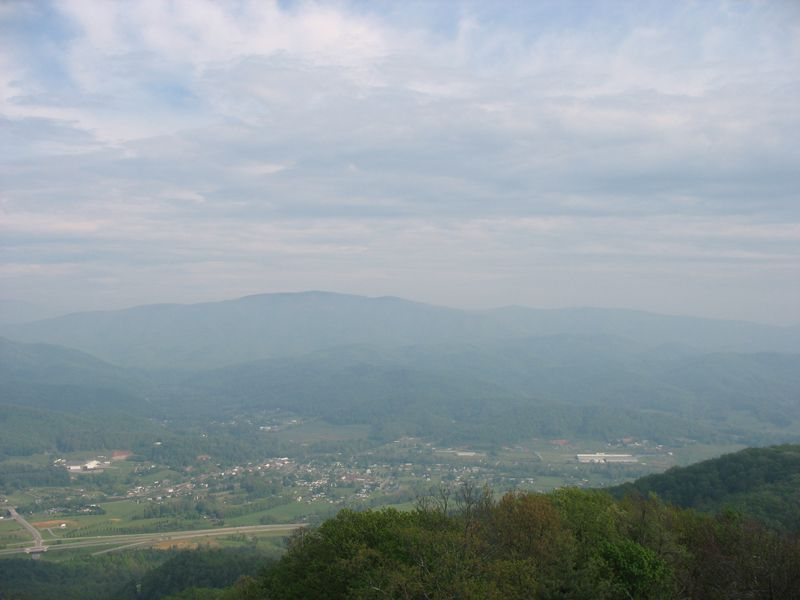
Unicoi viewed from Buffalo Mountain

Unicoi is surrounded by the Cherokee National Forest. Buffalo Mountain rises prominently to the west of Unicoi, and a series of rugged hills and ridges that comprise the outer Unaka Mountains rise to the east. Erwin, the county seat, is located further down the valley to the southwest. Johnson City is located opposite Buffalo Mountain to the north.

Interstate 26, which traverses the valley, passes through western Unicoi. Tennessee State Route 107 connects Unicoi with Erwin to the southwest and the rural Limestone Cove area to the east. Tennessee State Route 173 connects the town with U.S. Route 19E.

According to the United States Census Bureau, the town has a total area of 16.3 square miles (42 km^{2}), all of it land.

== Demographics ==
Historical population
Census	Pop.	Note	%±
2000	3,519		—
2010	3,632		3.2%
2020	3,833		5.5%

=== 2020 census ===
Unicoi racial composition
Race	Number	Percentage
White (non-Hispanic)	3,377	88.1%
Black or African American (non-Hispanic)	7	0.18%
Native American	12	0.31%
Asian	4	0.1%
Other/Mixed	115	3.0%
Hispanic or Latino	318	8.3%

As of the 2020 census, Unicoi had a population of 3,833. The median age was 45.7 years. 17.5% of residents were under the age of 18 and 21.9% of residents were 65 years of age or older. For every 100 females there were 106.6 males, and for every 100 females age 18 and over there were 103.5 males age 18 and over.

0.7% of residents lived in urban areas, while 99.3% lived in rural areas.

There were 1,570 households in Unicoi, of which 26.2% had children under the age of 18 living in them. Of all households, 53.0% were married-couple households, 17.9% were households with a male householder and no spouse or partner present, and 21.8% were households with a female householder and no spouse or partner present. About 25.3% of all households were made up of individuals and 11.5% had someone living alone who was 65 years of age or older.

There were 1,739 housing units, of which 9.7% were vacant. The homeowner vacancy rate was 1.6% and the rental vacancy rate was 3.0%.

=== 2000 census ===
As of the census of 2000, there were 3,519 people, 1,452 households, and 1,052 families residing in the town. The population density was 216.4 inhabitants per square mile (83.6/km^{2}). There were 1,562 housing units at an average density of 96.0 per square mile (37.1/km^{2}). The racial makeup of the town was 97.76% White, 0.06% African American, 0.31% Native American, 0.23% Asian, 0.03% Pacific Islander, 1.05% from other races, and 0.57% from two or more races. Hispanic or Latino of any race were 2.22% of the population.

There were 1,452 households, out of which 29.2% had children under the age of 18 living with them, 62.1% were married couples living together, 7.1% had a female householder with no husband present, and 27.5% were non-families. 23.2% of all households were made up of individuals, and 8.8% had someone living alone who was 65 years of age or older. The average household size was 2.42 and the average family size was 2.88.

In the town, the population was spread out, with 22.3% under the age of 18, 8.2% from 18 to 24, 29.7% from 25 to 44, 27.4% from 45 to 64, and 12.5% who were 65 years of age or older. The median age was 39 years. For every 100 females, there were 104.6 males. For every 100 females age 18 and over, there were 99.0 males.

The median income for a household in the town was $29,483, and the median income for a family was $40,208. Males had a median income of $31,299 versus $19,052 for females. The per capita income for the town was $15,870. About 9.7% of families and 13.2% of the population were below the poverty line, including 16.0% of those under age 18 and 19.9% of those age 65 or over.
