= Buladean, North Carolina =

Unincorporated community in North Carolina

Buladean is an unincorporated community in northern Mitchell County, North Carolina in the Harrell Township located along North Carolina State Highway 226 southeast of Unicoi, Tennessee, northwest of Bakersville, North Carolina and south of Roan Mountain.

== History ==
The community was originally called Wilder's Forge and later Magnetic City, due to its proximity to a large desposit of magnetic iron ore. The original name of "Wilder's Forge" came from the man who built the Cloudland Hotel on Roan Mountain, Union General Thomas Wilder. The community's current name is a portmanteau of the name of the community's first postmaster's daughter, who was named Beulah Dean.

== Community services ==
Buladean was formerly the site of Buladean Elementary school which served the community from the 1930s to 2011. The school building is now home to the Buladean Community Foundation Center, which supports the community in various ways, including delivering meals to hundreds of residents in need during the holiday season. Additionally, in March 2023 the Buladean Health Clinic was opened to serve the Buladean community.
