= Erwin, Tennessee =

Erwin
- Town
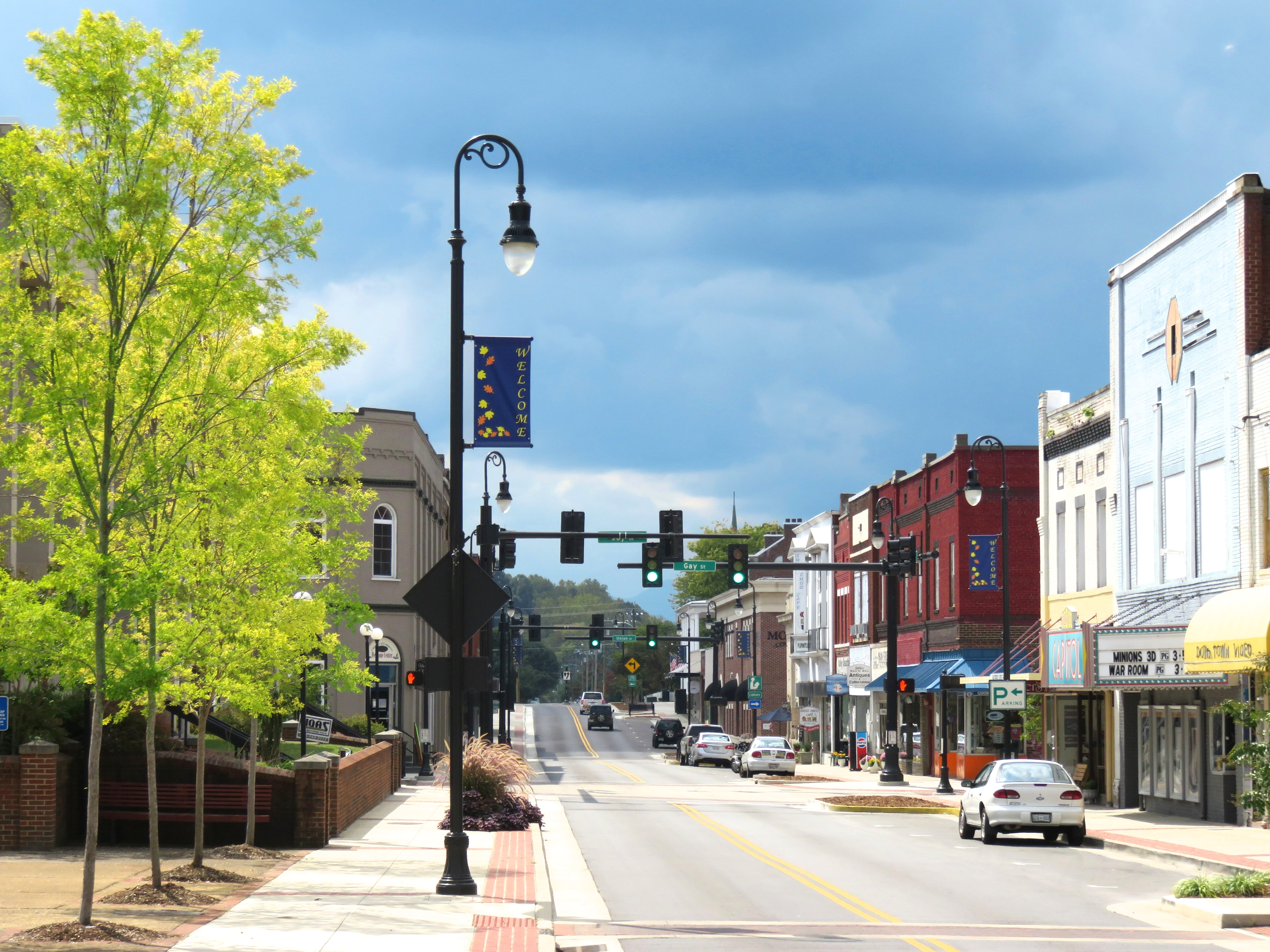
- View along Main Street in Erwin
- Motto: "Where the Mountains and the People Welcome You."
- Location of Erwin in Unicoi County, Tennessee.

- Location within Tennessee
- Coordinates: 36°8′42″N 82°24′39″W
- Country: United States
- State: Tennessee
- County: Unicoi
- Settled: 1780s
- Founded: 1876
- Incorporated: 1903
- Named for: David J.N. Ervin, early resident

Government
  - Type: Municipal Corporation
  - Mayor: Glenn White
  - Aldermen: Gary Chandler, James Hatcher, Michael Baker, Cathy Huskins, Angie Vaughn

Area
  - Total: 4.13 sq mi (10.70 km^{2})
  - Land: 4.13 sq mi (10.69 km^{2})
  - Water: 0.0039 sq mi (0.01 km^{2})
- Elevation: 1,670 ft (510 m)

Population (2020)
  - Total: 6,083
  - Density: 1,474/sq mi (569.2/km^{2})
- Time zone: UTC-5 (Eastern (EST))
  - Summer (DST): UTC-4 (EDT)
- ZIP code: 37650
- Area code: 423
- FIPS code: 47-24360
- GNIS feature ID: 1328148
- Website: erwintn.org

Erwin is a town in and the county seat of Unicoi County, Tennessee, United States. The population was 6,083 at the 2020 census. It is part of the Johnson City metropolitan area, which is a component of the "Tri-Cities" region.

== History ==
The town of Erwin received its name by a mail mishap. On December 5, 1879, the name of the town was Ervin, in honor of D.J.N. Ervin, who had donated 15 acres (61,000 m^{2}) of land for the county seat. A typo made by post office officials caused the name to be recorded as Erwin. The mistake was never corrected.

=== Railroads ===
From 1890 to 2015 railroad operations contributed greatly to Erwin's economic and cultural identity.

The Charleston, Cincinnati and Chicago Railroad (the Triple C) was chartered in 1886 with its headquarters in Johnson City, Tennessee. Trains ran through Erwin in 1890, but by the end of the year, the company disbanded and all construction and operation ceased.

In 1893 the Ohio River and Charleston Railway (OR&C) purchased the assets of the Charleston Cincinnati & Chicago Railroad in receivership and attempted to complete and operate the line. It too failed and was placed in receivership.

In 1909 the Carolina, Clinchfield and Ohio Railway (CCO) was completed, running from Dante, Virginia to Spartanburg, South Carolina, with its headquarters situated in Erwin. In 1915, this line was extended to Elkhorn City, Kentucky, to connect with the Chesapeake and Ohio Railway (C&O). In 1924, its ownership and name was officially changed to the Clinchfield Railroad (CRR).

On Aug. 31, 1987 the C&O railroad merged into CSX Transportation, which continued to maintain the Erwin rail yard. After acquiring 42% of Conrail in 1999, CSX became one of four major railroad systems in the nation, and Erwin continued to host the rail yard, diesel shop, and car repair facility until 2015.

=== Southern Potteries plant ===
Between 1916 and 1957, the Southern Potteries plant operated in Erwin along Ohio Avenue. The plant produced a hand-painted dishware known as Blue Ridge that became popular nationwide in the late 1930s and 1940s. Blue Ridge pieces are still popular items with collectors of antique dishware.

=== Elephant execution ===
Erwin earned some notoriety in 1916 when the only known public execution of an elephant in Tennessee occurred in the community. Mary, an elephant in 'Sparks World Famous Shows' traveling circus, had killed her handler, Walter Eldridge, in nearby Kingsport after the inexperienced trainer allegedly struck Mary on the head with a hook. News of a killer elephant spread via rumors and sensationalist news stories, and calls for Mary's execution began. Some towns announced they would turn the circus away if it showed up with the elephant. Mary's owner, Charlie Sparks, executed Mary by hanging in order to appease the crowds. Erwin was a little more than 35 miles south of Kingsport, and was home to the region's largest railway yard, they had a 100-ton crane car that could lift the five-ton elephant. An estimated 2,500 people turned out at the local railway yard to see Mary hoisted by a crane to meet her demise. Playwright George Brant won the 2008 Keene Prize for Literature for his a one-act play titled "Elephant's Graveyard", depicting this story.

In 2015 the town implemented a yearly festival and Elephant Art Auction; whereby, artists paint fiberglass elephant sculptures displayed around town that are then auctioned, with all proceeds donated exclusively to The Elephant Sanctuary in Hohenwald.

=== Lynching incident and Erwin Expulsion of 1918 ===
On May 19, 1918, four of Erwin's white citizens attacked a Black man named Tom DeVert during a poker game. He fled and they pursued, shooting. In the chaos, a teenage white girl named Georgia Lee Collins, who was passing by, was hit by a bullet. Devert was murdered and posthumously accused of having assaulted Collins. A group of white men dragged his body to the rail yard powerhouse, where they forced the entire Black population of Erwin to stand and witness DeVert's body being burned on a pyre of railroad cross-ties. According to the Bristol Herald of May 21, 1918, "Men with pistols, shotguns, and clubs stood before the lined up negroes to prevent their running away, and as the last cross tie and the last dash of oil was thrown on the heap one of the men is reported to have turned to the cowering crowd and said, 'Watch what we are going to do here. If any of you are left in town by tomorrow night, you will meet the same fate.'" At the height of this atrocity, the mob leaders planned to burn the homes of all of Erwin's Black citizens, but the local rail yard manager convinced them to forcibly evict them from the town instead. These residents, numbering 131 men, women, and children, were intimidated into abandoning their homes and goods and leaving at once.

Throughout the 20th century, Erwin was considered a sundown town. The "Erwin Expulsion of 1918," as it has been called, led to the town becoming known as "the place where Blacks dare not go," according to an article in the Johnson City Press-Chronicle of June 17, 1979. (Note: "The Negro population, which was very small, was located in two areas in Unicoi County: Sam's Gap, descended from slaves owned by Josiah Sams, and Erwin, where they were railroad laborers. In 1918, unrestrained, ghoulish, mob violence eradicated the Negro population in Unicoi County." Charles Edward Price Papers, Box 1, Folder 6, Blacks in Unicoi County, TN. Cited at)

=== Rail yard closure ===
In October 2015 CSX closed all operations in Erwin, and more than 300 people in the town were left without jobs. Town leaders attempted to fill the void by emphasizing a new identity for Erwin as an Appalachian tourist destination. This was the year that the Elephant Art Auction festivities began.

=== Hurricane Helene flooding ===
In September 2024, Erwin's riverside areas were heavily damaged by flooding as a result of Hurricane Helene. 58 people had to be rescued via helicopters from the roof of Unicoi County Hospital in Erwin, with units from the Virginia State Police assisting, after the hospital was almost entirely submerged.

Part of a set of bridges on Interstate 26 spanning the Nolichucky River in Erwin were completely washed away.

== Geography ==
Erwin is located at 36°8′42″N 82°24′39″W (36.145036, -82.410796), The town is situated in a valley at the confluence of North Indian Creek, which approaches from the northeast, and the Nolichucky River, which enters the valley from the mountains to the southeast. Just before reaching Erwin, the Nolichucky passes through a narrow gorge popular with whitewater rafters.

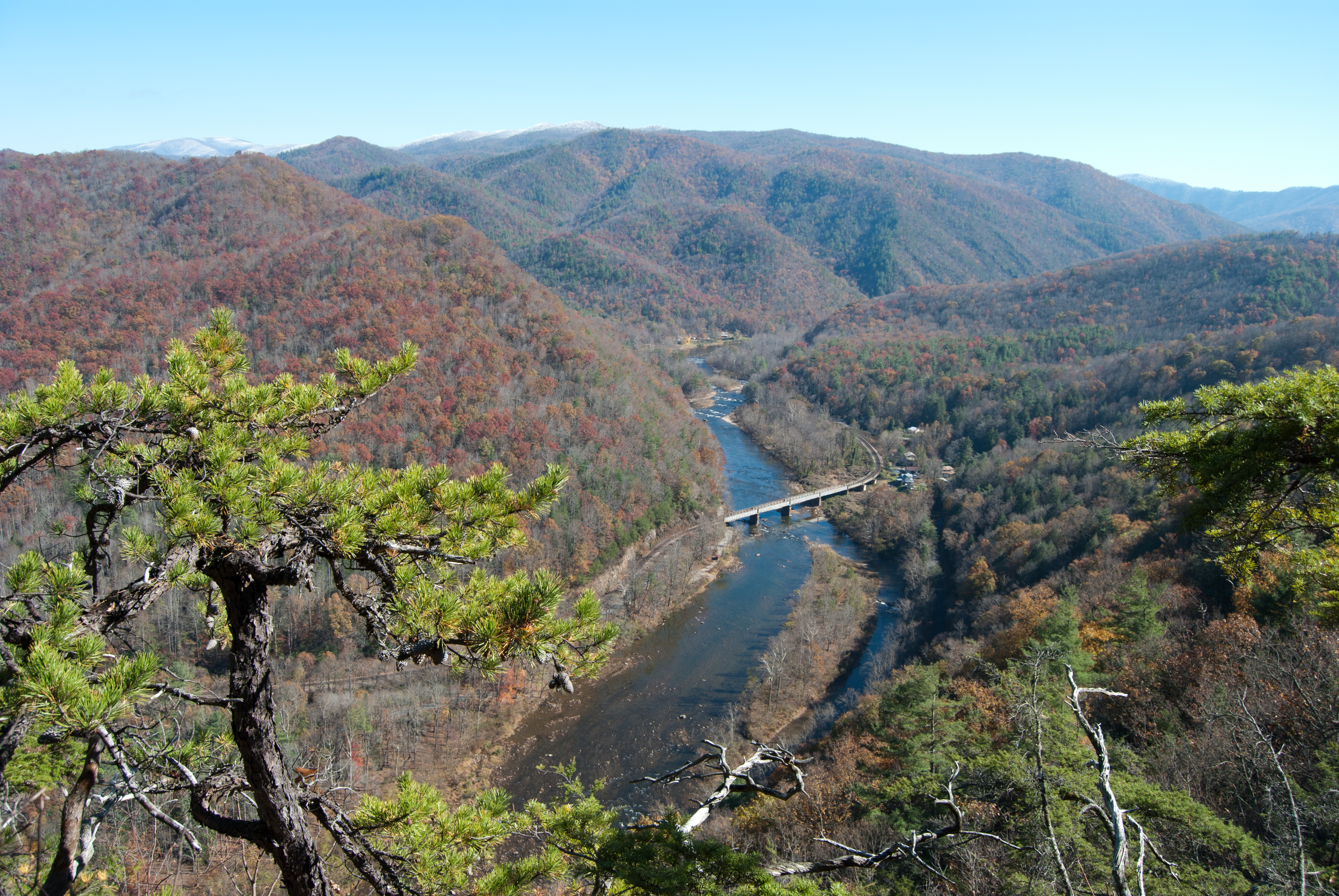
The Nolichucky River, approaching Erwin from the east, as seen from the Appalachian Trail

Erwin is surrounded by the Cherokee National Forest, and mountains dominate the view in all directions. Buffalo Mountain rises to the north, Rich Mountain rises to the west, and the Unaka Mountains rise to the south and east.

The Appalachian Trail passes east of Erwin. The trail crosses the Nolichucky near the western end of the Nolichucky Gorge, at a place known as Unaka Springs. Nearby is "Moaning Rock", a large boulder near the trail that is supposed to be the site of a long ago murder of a stranger. According to local lore, the murdered man's spirit is still around, and if anyone stands on or even touches the rock, "...it moans as if under a heavy burden."

Interstate 26 passes through western and southern Erwin. Tennessee State Route 107 (North Main Avenue) connects Erwin to Unicoi to the north and the Embreeville area and Washington County to the west. Tennessee State Route 395 connects Erwin with the rural parts of Mitchell and Yancey counties to the east in North Carolina, crossing the Unakas at the 3,100-foot (940 m) Indian Grave Gap (the road becomes North Carolina Highway 197 at the state line).

According to the United States Census Bureau, the city has a total area of 3.5 square miles (9.1 km^{2}), of which 3.5 square miles (9.1 km^{2}) is land and 0.28% is water.

=== Climate ===
Climate data for Erwin 1 W, Tennessee (1991–2020 normals, extremes 1979–present)
Month	Jan	Feb	Mar	Apr	May	Jun	Jul	Aug	Sep	Oct	Nov	Dec	Year
Record high °F (°C)	75 (24)	82 (28)	85 (29)	90 (32)	91 (33)	101 (38)	102 (39)	101 (38)	98 (37)	92 (33)	84 (29)	78 (26)	102 (39)
Mean daily maximum °F (°C)	47.3 (8.5)	50.8 (10.4)	58.7 (14.8)	68.4 (20.2)	76.2 (24.6)	82.8 (28.2)	85.4 (29.7)	84.9 (29.4)	80.2 (26.8)	69.9 (21.1)	58.9 (14.9)	50.3 (10.2)	67.8 (19.9)
Daily mean °F (°C)	35.9 (2.2)	38.9 (3.8)	45.8 (7.7)	54.5 (12.5)	63.0 (17.2)	70.5 (21.4)	73.8 (23.2)	73.0 (22.8)	67.6 (19.8)	56.6 (13.7)	45.7 (7.6)	39.1 (3.9)	55.4 (13.0)
Mean daily minimum °F (°C)	24.5 (−4.2)	26.9 (−2.8)	33.0 (0.6)	40.7 (4.8)	49.8 (9.9)	58.1 (14.5)	62.2 (16.8)	61.1 (16.2)	55.0 (12.8)	43.3 (6.3)	32.5 (0.3)	28.0 (−2.2)	42.9 (6.1)
Record low °F (°C)	−20 (−29)	−11 (−24)	−5 (−21)	19 (−7)	24 (−4)	37 (3)	45 (7)	45 (7)	31 (−1)	22 (−6)	12 (−11)	−5 (−21)	−20 (−29)
Average precipitation inches (mm)	3.46 (88)	3.27 (83)	3.82 (97)	3.99 (101)	4.83 (123)	5.07 (129)	5.51 (140)	4.76 (121)	3.28 (83)	2.54 (65)	2.83 (72)	3.64 (92)	47.00 (1,194)
Average snowfall inches (cm)	3.4 (8.6)	2.5 (6.4)	0.9 (2.3)	0.0 (0.0)	0.0 (0.0)	0.0 (0.0)	0.0 (0.0)	0.0 (0.0)	0.0 (0.0)	0.0 (0.0)	0.1 (0.25)	2.4 (6.1)	9.3 (24)
Average precipitation days (≥ 0.01 in)	12.0	11.0	11.9	10.9	13.4	13.3	13.8	12.3	9.6	8.4	9.3	11.6	137.5
Average snowy days (≥ 0.1 in)	2.3	1.4	0.9	0.1	0.0	0.0	0.0	0.0	0.0	0.0	0.1	1.2	6.0
Source: NOAA

== Demographics ==
Historical population
Census	Pop.	Note	%±
1910	1,149		—
1920	2,965		158.1%
1930	3,623		22.2%
1940	3,350		−7.5%
1950	3,387		1.1%
1960	3,210		−5.2%
1970	4,715		46.9%
1980	4,739		0.5%
1990	5,015		5.8%
2000	5,610		11.9%
2010	6,097		8.7%
2020	6,083		−0.2%

=== 2020 census ===
Erwin racial composition
Race	Number	Percentage
White (non-Hispanic)	5,417	89.05%
Black or African American (non-Hispanic)	19	0.31%
Native American	10	0.16%
Asian	11	0.18%
Other/Mixed	185	3.04%
Hispanic or Latino	441	7.25%

As of the 2020 United States census, there were 6,083 people, 2,657 households, and 1,632 families residing in the town.

=== 2000 census ===
At the 2000 census there were 5,610 people in 2,470 households, including 1,588 families, in the city. The population density was 1,582.8 inhabitants per square mile (611.1/km^{2}). There were 2,645 housing units at an average density of 746.2 per square mile (288.1/km^{2}). The racial makeup of the city was 97.77% white, 0.05% African American, 0.29% Native American, 0.11% Asian, 1.02% from other races, and 0.77% from two or more races. Hispanic or Latino of any race were 2.00%.

Of the 2,470 households 23.4% had children under the age of 18 living with them, 50.6% were married couples living together, 10.9% had a single parent only, and 35.7% were non-families. 33.6% of households were one person and 18.3% were one person aged 65 or older. The average household size was 2.21 and the average family size was 2.80.

The age distribution was 19.7% under the age of 18, 6.8% from 18 to 24, 25.5% from 25 to 44, 25.1% from 45 to 64, and 22.9% 65 or older. The median age was 44 years. For every 100 females, there were 86.3 males.

The median household income was $29,644 and the median family income was $37,813. Males had a median income of $31,894 versus $20,118 for females. The per capita income for the city was $15,868. About 7.5% of families and 13.0% of the population were below the poverty line, including 20.7% of those under age 18 and 8.2% of those age 65 or over.

== Economy and culture ==
Nuclear Fuel Services has a major facility in Erwin. It began operation in 1957 as the Davison Chemical Division of W. R. Grace and Company. Production activities at the Erwin facility include preparing enriched uranium to be processed into nuclear reactor fuel, processing uranium hexafluoride into other uranium compounds, and downblending high-enriched uranium to convert it to a low-enriched form for use in commercial nuclear reactors. Historically the facility also worked with thorium compounds.

== Education ==
All Unicoi County residents are in the Unicoi County School District.

== Sports ==
In 1940, the city hosted a Minor League Baseball team of the Appalachian League called the Erwin Mountaineers. The same league's Erwin Aces played there in 1943 as did the Erwin Cubs in 1944, both as farm clubs of the Chicago Cubs. The Aces won the 1943 Appalachian League playoff championship.
