= Tusculum, Tennessee =

Tusculum
- City
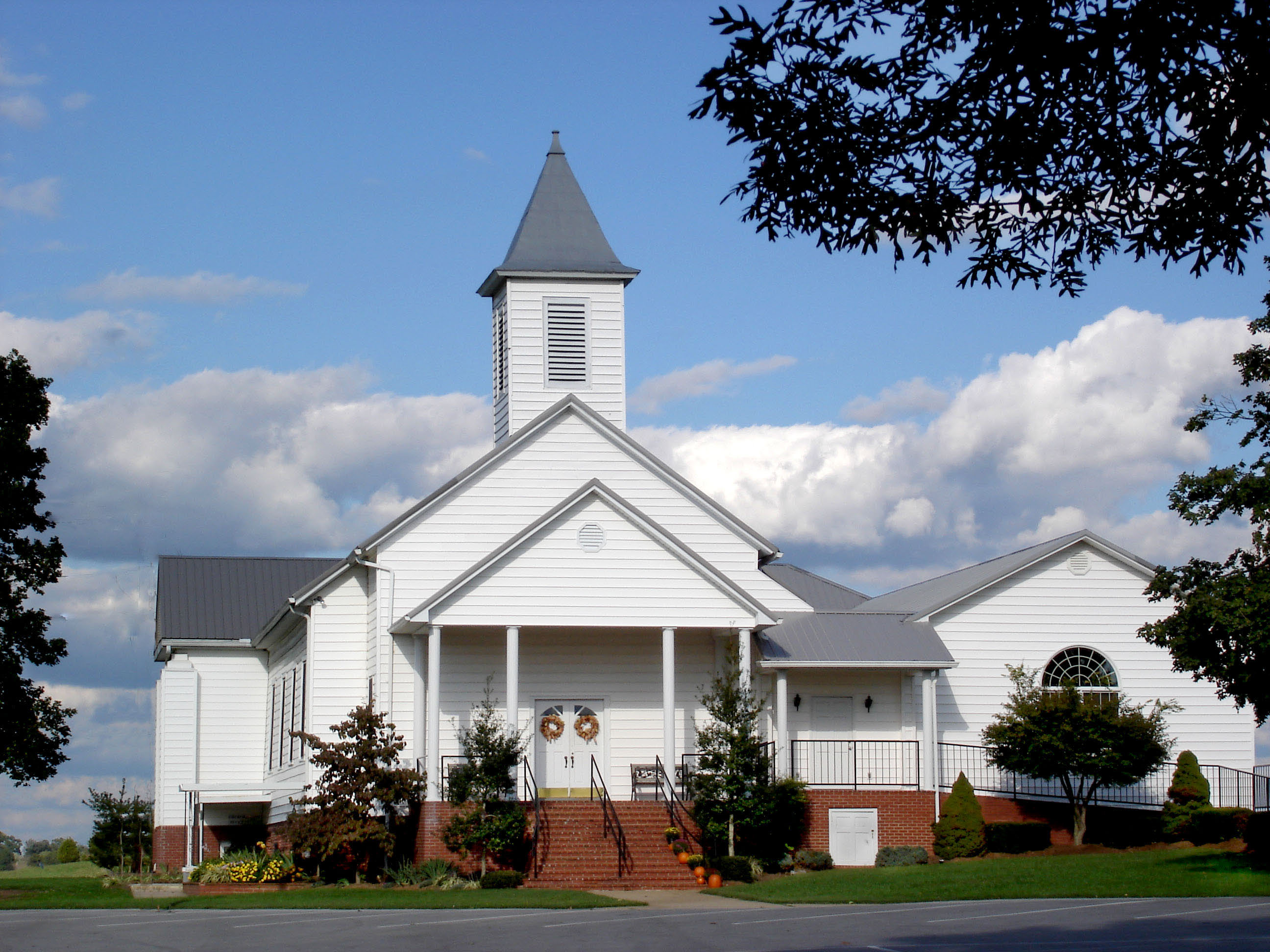
- Shiloh Cumberland Presbyterian Church in Tusculum

- Flag Seal
- Motto: "First in Education"
- Location of Tusculum in Greene County, Tennessee.
- Coordinates: 36°10′30″N 82°44′43″W
- Country: United States
- State: Tennessee
- County: Greene
- Incorporated: 1959
- Named after: Ancient Tusculum

Government
  - Mayor: Alan Corley
  - Vice Mayor: Barbara Britton
  - City Commissioner: Mike Burns

Area
  - Total: 4.86 sq mi (12.59 km^{2})
  - Land: 4.86 sq mi (12.59 km^{2})
  - Water: 0 sq mi (0.00 km^{2})
- Elevation: 1,457 ft (444 m)

Population (2020)
  - Total: 3,298
  - Density: 678.3/sq mi (261.91/km^{2})
- Time zone: UTC-5 (Eastern (EST))
  - Summer (DST): UTC-4 (EDT)
- ZIP codes: 37616 & 37745
- FIPS code: 47-75560
- GNIS feature ID: 2405615
- Website: www.tusculumcity.org

Tusculum is a city in Greene County, Tennessee, United States. The population was 3,298 at the 2020 census. It is the site of Tusculum University, the oldest university in Tennessee and the 28th oldest in the United States. Tusculum is a suburb of nearby Greeneville. The population of both Greeneville and Tusculum combined was approximately 18,777 at the 2020 census.

== Geography ==
According to the United States Census Bureau, the city has a total area of 4.8 square miles (12.5 km^{2}), all land.

=== Neighborhoods ===
- Afton
- Tusculum Place
- Twin Oaks

== Demographics ==
Historical population
| Census | Pop. | Note | %± |
|---|---|---|---|
| 1960 | 1,433 | | — |
| 1970 | 1,180 | | −17.7% |
| 1980 | 1,242 | | 5.3% |
| 1990 | 1,918 | | 54.4% |
| 2000 | 2,004 | | 4.5% |
| 2010 | 2,663 | | 32.9% |
| 2020 | 3,298 | | 23.8% |

=== 2020 census ===
As of the 2020 census, Tusculum had a population of 3,298. The median age was 21.2 years. 11.5% of residents were under the age of 18 and 16.8% of residents were 65 years of age or older. For every 100 females there were 99.9 males, and for every 100 females age 18 and over there were 98.9 males age 18 and over.

86.5% of residents lived in urban areas, while 13.5% lived in rural areas.

There were 788 households in Tusculum, of which 24.6% had children under the age of 18 living in them. Of all households, 56.3% were married-couple households, 14.7% were households with a male householder and no spouse or partner present, and 24.4% were households with a female householder and no spouse or partner present. About 24.8% of all households were made up of individuals and 15.8% had someone living alone who was 65 years of age or older.

There were 863 housing units, of which 8.7% were vacant. The homeowner vacancy rate was 1.9% and the rental vacancy rate was 4.8%.

Racial composition as of the 2020 census
| Race | Number | Percent |
|---|---|---|
| White | 2,726 | 82.7% |
| Black or African American | 254 | 7.7% |
| American Indian and Alaska Native | 22 | 0.7% |
| Asian | 55 | 1.7% |
| Native Hawaiian and Other Pacific Islander | 1 | 0.0% |
| Some other race | 133 | 4.0% |
| Two or more races | 107 | 3.2% |
| Hispanic or Latino (of any race) | 278 | 8.4% |

=== 2000 census ===
At the 2000 census, there were 2,004 people, 590 households and 437 families residing in the city. The population density was 445.4 per square mile (172.0/km^{2}). There were 620 housing units at an average density of 137.8 per square mile (53.2/km^{2}). The racial makeup of the city was 95.41% White, 3.64% African American, 0.05% Native American, 0.50% Asian, 0.05% from other races, and 0.35% from two or more races. Hispanic or Latino of any race were 0.30% of the population.

There were 590 households, of which 24.4% had children under the age of 18 living with them, 64.4% were married couples living together, 7.3% had a female householder with no husband present, and 25.8% were non-families. 23.1% of all households were made up of individuals, and 9.2% had someone living alone who was 65 years of age or older. The average household size was 2.28 and the average family size was 2.66.

12.7% of the population were under the age of 18, 18.3% from 18 to 24, 25.4% from 25 to 44, 28.8% from 45 to 64, and 14.9% who were 65 years of age or older. The median age was 41 years. For every 100 females, there were 106.2 males. For every 100 females age 18 and over, there were 104.2 males.

The median household income was $37,460 and the median family income was $50,074. Males had a median income of $31,607 and females $23,594. The per capita income was $15,834. About 5.8% of families and 6.1% of the population were below the poverty line, including 3.4% of those under age 18 and 9.0% of those age 65 or over.

== Education ==
Tusculum is the site of the main campus of Tusculum University.

Greene County Public Schools, the school district of the area, operates one elementary school in Tusculum, Doak Elementary School, serving grades Pk-5. Chuckey-Doak Middle School and Chuckey-Doak High School are also located in Tusculum city limits but both have an Afton address. They are also operated by Greene County Public Schools.

== Postal service ==
Tusculum has a branch post office located on the college campus. The main zip code for Tusculum is 37745, although some portions of the city are in Afton's zip code, 37616.

Tusculum shares the zip code 37745 with Baileyton and Greeneville.

== Recreation ==
The City of Tusculum operates and manages Tusculum City Park and Tusculum Linear Park Trail (Greenway)

== Transportation ==
State Route 107 formerly went through downtown Tusculum, it has since been rerouted along U.S. Route 11E and US Route 321 on the north side of the city and on a new alignment of SR-107 on the east side of the city, titled Tusculum Bypass. US-11E and US-321 run concurrently on the north side of the city. SR-351 also junctions with SR-107 on the southeast side of the city. The main road through downtown is Erwin Highway (the former SR-107).
