= South Greene, Tennessee =

Unincorporated community in Tennessee, US

Coordinates: 36.0523245°N 82.8568153°W

South Greene is an unincorporated community in Greene County, Tennessee. South Greene is located approximately 5 miles (8.0 km) south of the town of Greeneville.

== Postal service ==
South Greene does not have a post office or its own zip code. The closest post office is in Greeneville. South Greene shares Greeneville's zip code 37743.

== Education ==
- Nolachuckey Elementary School
- South Greene High School
