= Greeneville, Tennessee =

Town in Tennessee, United States

Greeneville
- Town
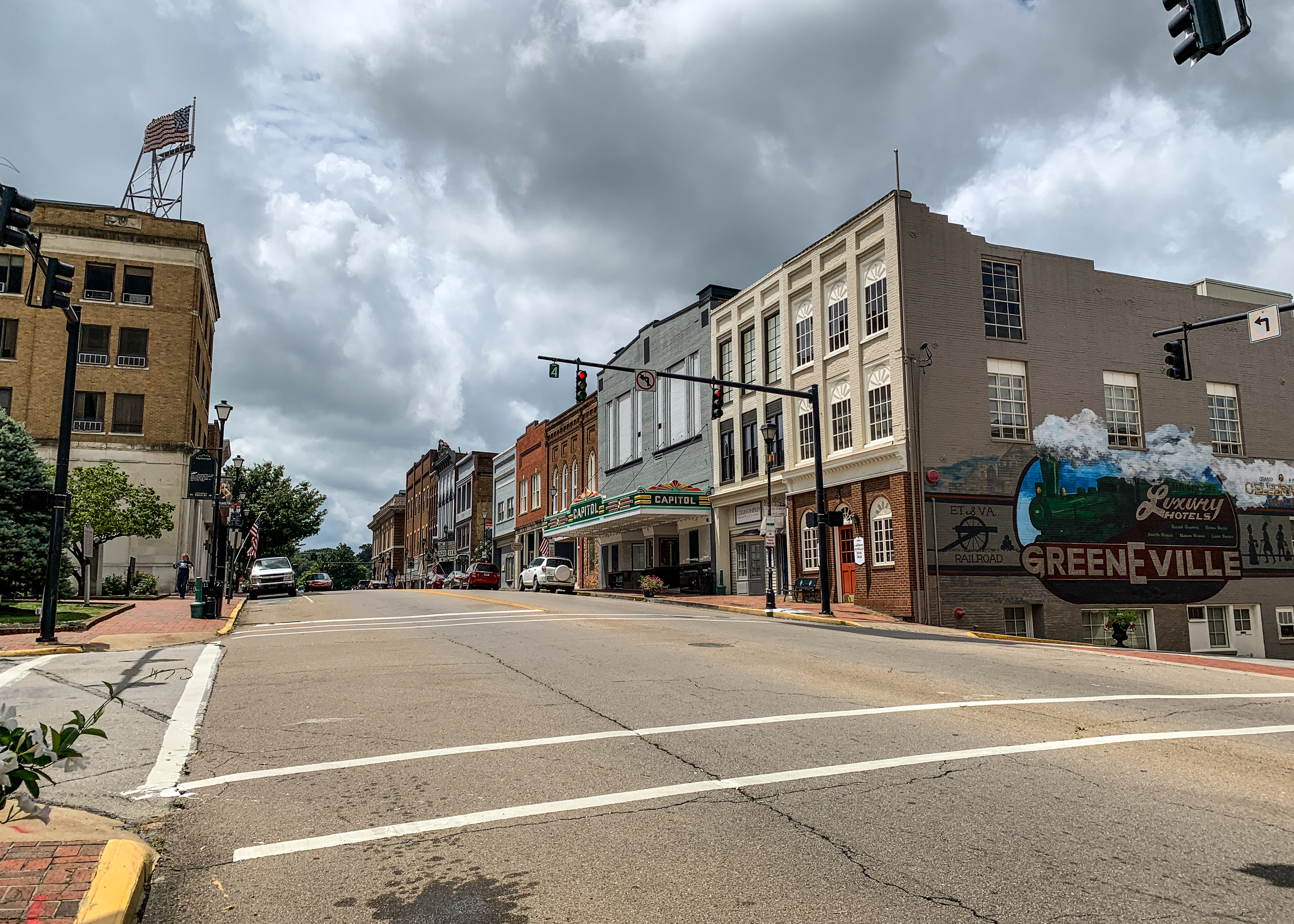
- Corner of Main and Depot in downtown Greeneville

- Flag Logo
- Nickname: Home of President Andrew Johnson
- Location of Greeneville in Greene County, Tennessee.
- Coordinates: 36°10′05″N 82°49′11″W
- Country: United States
- State: Tennessee
- County: Greene
- Settled: 1780
- Founded: 1783
- Incorporated: 1795
- Named for: Nathanael Greene

Government
  - Type: Council-Manager
  - Mayor: Cal Doty
  - City Manager: Todd Smith
  - City Recorder: Lora Young
  - Chief of Police: Steve Spano
  - City Council: List of Council members: Tim Ward - First Ward; Ginny Kidwell - First Ward; Tim Teague - Second Ward; Scott Bullington - Second Ward

Area
  - Town: 17.00 sq mi (44.02 km^{2})
  - Land: 17.00 sq mi (44.02 km^{2})
  - Water: 0 sq mi (0.00 km^{2})
- Elevation: 1,595 ft (486 m)

Population (2020)
  - Town: 15,479
  - Density: 910.7/sq mi (351.63/km^{2})
  - Urban: 23,664
- Time zone: UTC-5 (Eastern (EST))
  - Summer (DST): UTC-4 (EDT)
- ZIP Codes: 37616, 37743 & 37745 (General Delivery) and 37744 (P.O. Boxes)
- Area codes: 423 and 729
- FIPS code: 47-30980
- GNIS feature ID: 2406613
- Website: www.greenevilletn.gov

Greeneville is an incorporated town in and the county seat of Greene County, Tennessee, United States. The population as of the 2020 census was 15,479. The town was named in honor of Revolutionary War hero Nathanael Greene, and it is the second oldest town in Tennessee. It is the only town with this spelling in the United States, although there are numerous U.S. towns named Greenville. The town was the capital of the short-lived State of Franklin in the 18th-century history of East Tennessee.

Greeneville is known as the town where United States President Andrew Johnson began his political career when elected to be an alderman and transitioned from his trade as a tailor. He and his family lived there for most of his adult years. It was an area of strong abolitionist and Unionist views and yeoman farmers, an environment that influenced Johnson's outlook.

The Greeneville Historic District was established in 1974.

The U.S. Navy Los Angeles-class submarine USS Greeneville was named in honor of the town.

Greeneville is part of the Johnson City-Kingsport-Bristol, TN-VA Combined Statistical Area – commonly known as the "Tri-Cities" region. Tusculum University, a private Christian university located in nearby Tusculum, has a Greeneville mailing address.

== Geography ==
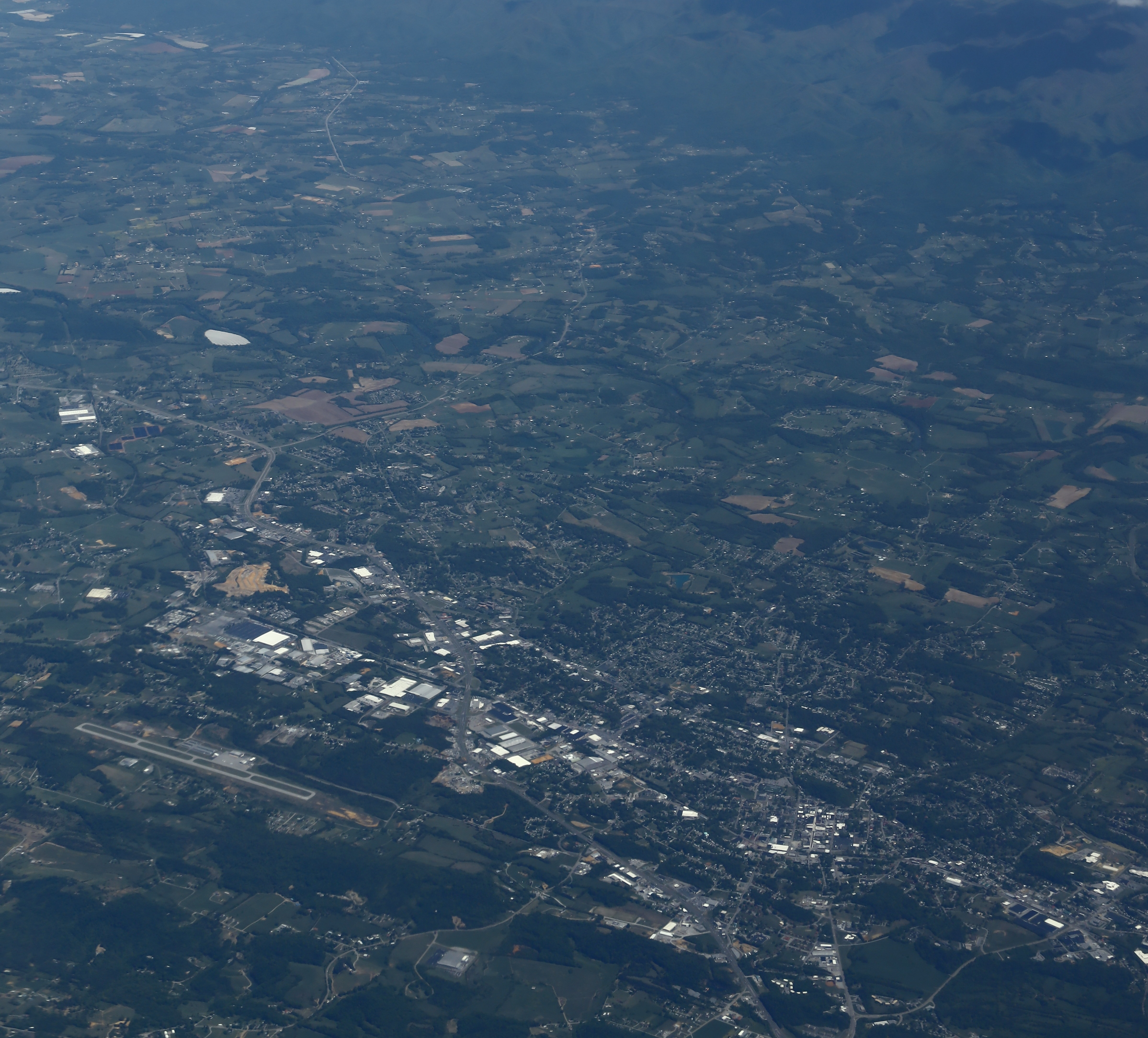
Aerial view of Greeneville

Greeneville lies in the foothills of the Appalachian Mountains. These hills are part of the Appalachian Ridge-and-Valley Province, which is characterized by fertile river valleys flanked by narrow, elongate ridges. Greeneville is located roughly halfway between Bays Mountain to the northwest and the Bald Mountains— part of the main Appalachian crest— to the southeast. The valley in which Greeneville is situated is part of the watershed of the Nolichucky River, which passes a few miles south of the town.

Several federal and state highways now intersect in Greeneville, as they were built to follow old roads and trails. U.S. Route 321 follows Main Street through the center of the town and connects Greeneville to Newport to the southwest. U.S. Route 11E (Andrew Johnson Highway), which connects Greeneville with Morristown to the west, intersects U.S. 321 in Greeneville and the merged highway proceeds northeast to Johnson City. Tennessee State Route 107, which also follows Main Street and Andrew Johnson Hwy, Greeneville to Erwin to the east and to the Del Rio area to the south. Tennessee State Route 70 (Lonesome Pine Trail) connects Greeneville with Interstate 81, and Rogersville to the north and Asheville, North Carolina to the south. Tennessee State Route 172 (Baileyton Road) connects Greeneville with Interstate 81 and Baileyton to the north.

Tennessee State Route 93 (Kingsport Highway) connects Greeneville to Interstate 81, Fall Branch and Kingsport to the north.

According to the United States Census Bureau, the town has a total area of 17.01 square miles (44.1 km^{2}), all land.

=== Climate ===
Climate data for Greeneville, Tennessee (1991–2020 normals, extremes 1890–present)
Month	Jan	Feb	Mar	Apr	May	Jun	Jul	Aug	Sep	Oct	Nov	Dec	Year
Record high °F (°C)	79 (26)	82 (28)	86 (30)	90 (32)	96 (36)	101 (38)	104 (40)	100 (38)	102 (39)	95 (35)	85 (29)	80 (27)	104 (40)
Mean daily maximum °F (°C)	47.6 (8.7)	51.8 (11.0)	60.1 (15.6)	69.6 (20.9)	77.5 (25.3)	84.2 (29.0)	87.3 (30.7)	86.7 (30.4)	82.1 (27.8)	71.8 (22.1)	60.0 (15.6)	50.8 (10.4)	69.1 (20.6)
Daily mean °F (°C)	36.6 (2.6)	40.0 (4.4)	47.1 (8.4)	55.9 (13.3)	64.8 (18.2)	72.5 (22.5)	76.1 (24.5)	74.9 (23.8)	69.1 (20.6)	57.7 (14.3)	46.6 (8.1)	39.7 (4.3)	56.8 (13.8)
Mean daily minimum °F (°C)	25.5 (−3.6)	28.2 (−2.1)	34.0 (1.1)	42.2 (5.7)	52.1 (11.2)	60.7 (15.9)	64.9 (18.3)	63.1 (17.3)	56.2 (13.4)	43.6 (6.4)	33.1 (0.6)	28.6 (−1.9)	44.4 (6.9)
Record low °F (°C)	−29 (−34)	−23 (−31)	−9 (−23)	16 (−9)	26 (−3)	35 (2)	45 (7)	40 (4)	28 (−2)	14 (−10)	3 (−16)	−16 (−27)	−29 (−34)
Average precipitation inches (mm)	3.52 (89)	3.80 (97)	3.96 (101)	4.36 (111)	4.34 (110)	4.26 (108)	4.96 (126)	4.44 (113)	3.04 (77)	2.70 (69)	2.95 (75)	4.06 (103)	46.39 (1,178)
Average snowfall inches (cm)	2.2 (5.6)	2.9 (7.4)	1.4 (3.6)	0.0 (0.0)	0.0 (0.0)	0.0 (0.0)	0.0 (0.0)	0.0 (0.0)	0.0 (0.0)	0.0 (0.0)	0.2 (0.51)	1.0 (2.5)	7.7 (20)
Average precipitation days (≥ 0.01 in)	12.2	12.3	13.4	12.0	12.5	12.4	13.1	11.2	9.1	8.9	10.1	12.9	140.1
Average snowy days (≥ 0.1 in)	2.0	2.0	0.8	0.0	0.0	0.0	0.0	0.0	0.0	0.0	0.2	1.0	6.0
Source: NOAA

=== Neighborhoods ===
- Buckingham Heights
- Cherrydale
- Emerald Point
- Oak Hills
- Windy Hills
- Harrison Hills
- South Greene
- Vestal Heights

== History ==
=== Early history ===
Big Spring in downtown Greeneville

Native Americans were hunting and camping in the Nolichucky Valley as early as the Paleo-Indian period (c. 10,000 B.C.). A substantial Woodland period (1000 B.C. - 1000 A.D.) village existed at the Nolichucky's confluence with Big Limestone Creek (now part of Davy Crockett Birthplace State Park). By the time the first Euro-American settlers arrived in the area in the late 18th century, the Cherokee claimed the valley as part of their hunting grounds. The Great Indian Warpath passed just northwest of modern Greeneville, and the townsite is believed to have once been the juncture of two lesser Native American trails.

The permanent European settlement of Greene County began in 1772. Jacob Brown, a North Carolina merchant, leased a large stretch of land from the Cherokee, located between the upper Lick Creek watershed and the Nolichucky River, in what is now the northeastern corner of the county. The "Nolichucky Settlement" initially aligned itself with the Watauga Association as part of Washington County, North Carolina. After voting irregularities in a local election, however, an early Nolichucky settler named Daniel Kennedy (1750–1802) led a movement to form a separate county, which was granted in 1783.

The county was named after Nathanael Greene, reflecting the loyalties of the numerous Revolutionary War veterans who settled in the Nolichucky Valley, especially from Pennsylvania and Virginia. The first county court sessions were held at the home of Robert Kerr, who lived at "Big Spring" (near the center of modern Greeneville). Kerr donated 50 acres (0.20 km^{2}) for the establishment of the county seat, most of which was located in the area currently bounded by Irish, College, Church, and Summer streets. "Greeneville" was officially recognized as a town in 1786.

=== State of Franklin ===
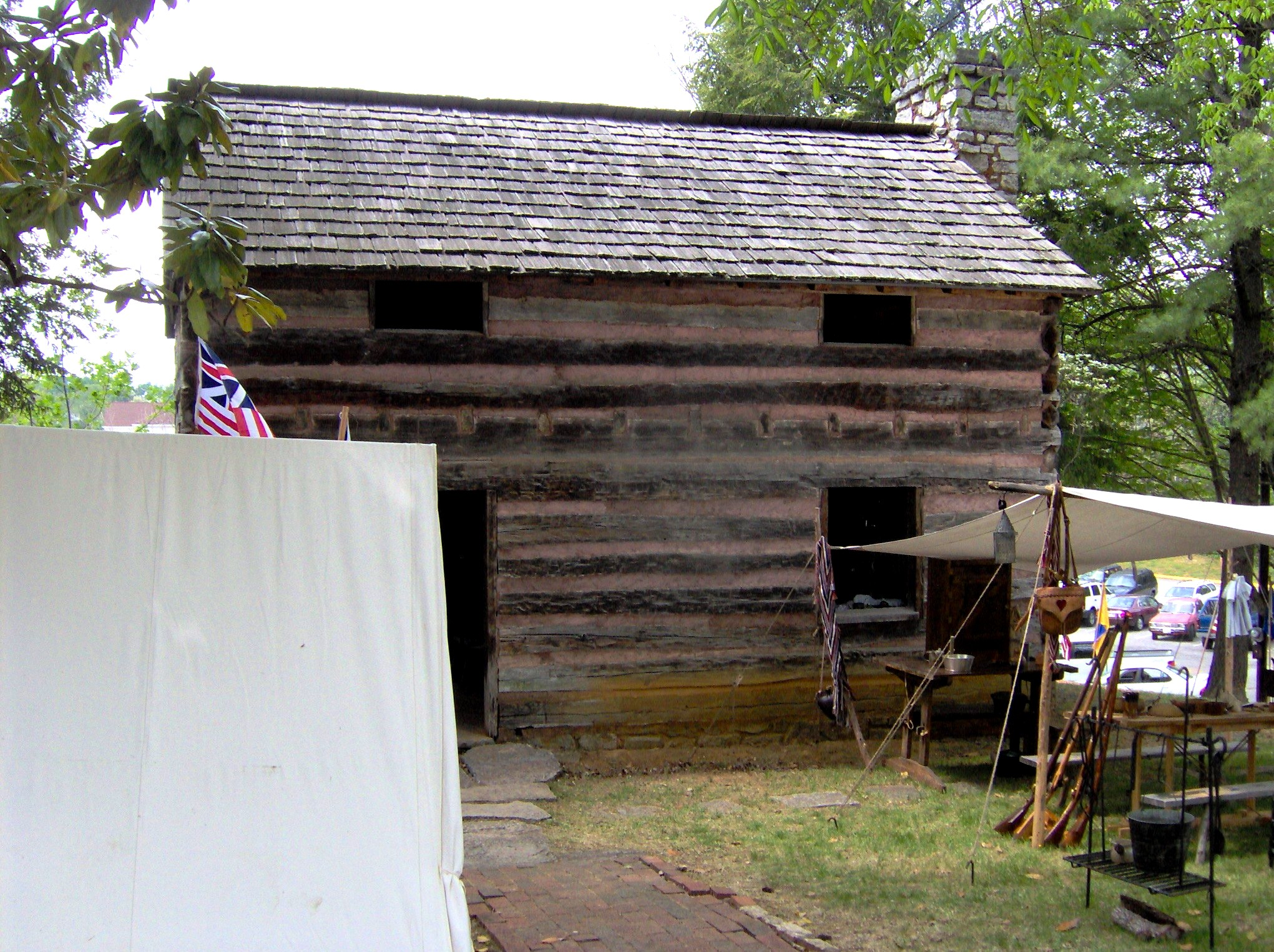
Replica of the Capitol of the State of Franklin in Greeneville

In 1784, North Carolina attempted to resolve its debts by giving the U.S. Congress its lands west of the Appalachian Mountains, including Greene County, abandoning responsibility for the area to the federal government. In response, delegates from Greene and neighboring counties convened at Jonesborough and resolved to break away from North Carolina and establish an independent state. The delegates agreed to meet again later that year to form a constitution, which was rejected when presented to the general delegation in December. Reverend Samuel Houston (not to be confused with the later governor of Tennessee and Texas) had presented a draft constitution that restricted the election of lawyers and other professionals. Houston's draft met staunch opposition, especially from Reverend Hezekiah Balch (1741–1810) (who was later instrumental in the creation of Tusculum College). John Sevier was elected governor, and other executive offices were filled.

A petition for statehood for what would have become known as the State of Franklin (named in honor of Benjamin Franklin) was drawn at the delegates session in May 1785. The delegates submitted a petition for statehood to Congress, which failed to gain the requisite votes needed for admission to the Union. The first state legislature of Franklin met in December 1785 in a crude log courthouse in Greeneville, which had been named the capital city the previous August. During this session, the delegates finally approved a constitution that was based on, and quite similar to, the North Carolina state constitution. However, the Franklin movement began to collapse soon thereafter, with North Carolina reasserting its control of the area the following spring.

In 1897, at the Tennessee Centennial Exposition in Nashville, a log house that had been moved from Greeneville was displayed as the capitol where the State of Franklin's delegates met in the 1780s. There is, however, nothing to verify that this building was the actual capitol. In the 1960s, the capitol was reconstructed, based largely on the dimensions given in historian J. G. M. Ramsey's Annals of Tennessee.

=== Greeneville and the abolitionist movement ===
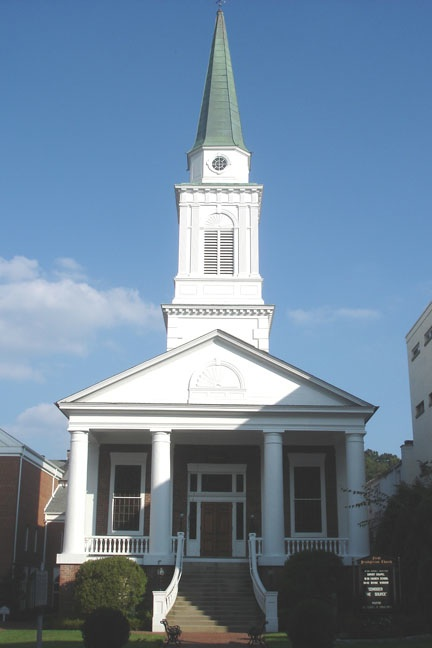
First Presbyterian Church, founded by Rev. Hezekiah Balch and Samuel Doak in 1780

Greene County, like much of East Tennessee, was home to a strong abolitionist movement in the early 19th century. This movement was likely influenced by the relatively large numbers of Quakers who migrated to the region from Pennsylvania in the 1790s. The Quakers considered slavery to be in violation of Biblical Scripture and were active in the region's abolitionist movement throughout the antebellum period. One such Quaker was Elihu Embree (1782–1820), who published the nation's first abolitionist newspaper, The Emancipator, at nearby Jonesborough.

When Embree's untimely death in 1820 effectively ended publication of The Emancipator, several of Embree's supporters turned to Ohio abolitionist Benjamin Lundy, who had started publication of his own antislavery newspaper, The Genius of Universal Emancipation, in 1821. Anticipating that a southern-based abolitionist movement would be more effective, Lundy purchased Embree's printing press and moved to Greeneville in 1822. Lundy remained in Greeneville for two years before moving to Baltimore. He would later prove influential in the career of William Lloyd Garrison, whom he hired as an associate editor in 1829.

Greenevillians involved in the abolitionist movement included Hezekiah Balch, who freed his slaves at the Greene County Courthouse in 1807. Samuel Doak, the founder of Tusculum College, followed in 1818. Valentine Sevier (1780–1854), a nephew of John Sevier who served as Greene County Court Clerk, freed his slaves in the 1830s and offered to pay for their passage to Liberia, which had been formed as a colony for freed slaves. Francis McCorkle, the pastor of Greeneville's Presbyterian Church, was a leading member of the Manumission Society of Tennessee.

=== Civil War ===
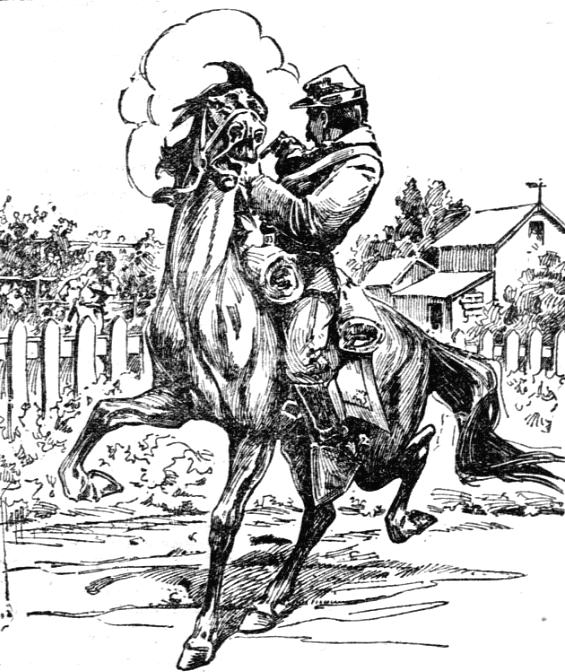
Artist's depiction of a Union soldier firing the shots that killed General John Hunt Morgan in Greeneville in 1864

In June 1861, on the eve of the Civil War, thirty counties of the pro-Union East Tennessee Convention met in Greeneville to discuss strategy after state voters had elected to join the Confederate States of America. The convention sought to create a separate state in East Tennessee that would remain with the United States. The state government in Nashville rejected the convention's request, however, and East Tennessee was occupied by Confederate forces shortly thereafter. Thomas Dickens Arnold, a Greeneville resident and former congressman who attended the convention, advocated the use of violent force to allow East Tennessee to break away from Tennessee, and taunted other members of the convention who advocated a more peaceful set of resolutions.

Several conspirators involved in the pro-Union East Tennessee bridge burnings lived near what is now Mosheim, and managed to destroy the railroad bridge over Lick Creek in western Greene County on the night of November 8, 1861. Two of the conspirators, Jacob Hensie and Henry Fry, were executed in Greeneville on November 30, 1861.

A portion of James Longstreet's army wintered in Greeneville following the failed Siege of Knoxville in late 1863. Confederate general John Hunt Morgan was killed in Greeneville during a raid by Union soldiers led by Alvan Cullem Gillem on September 4, 1864.

=== Andrew Johnson ===
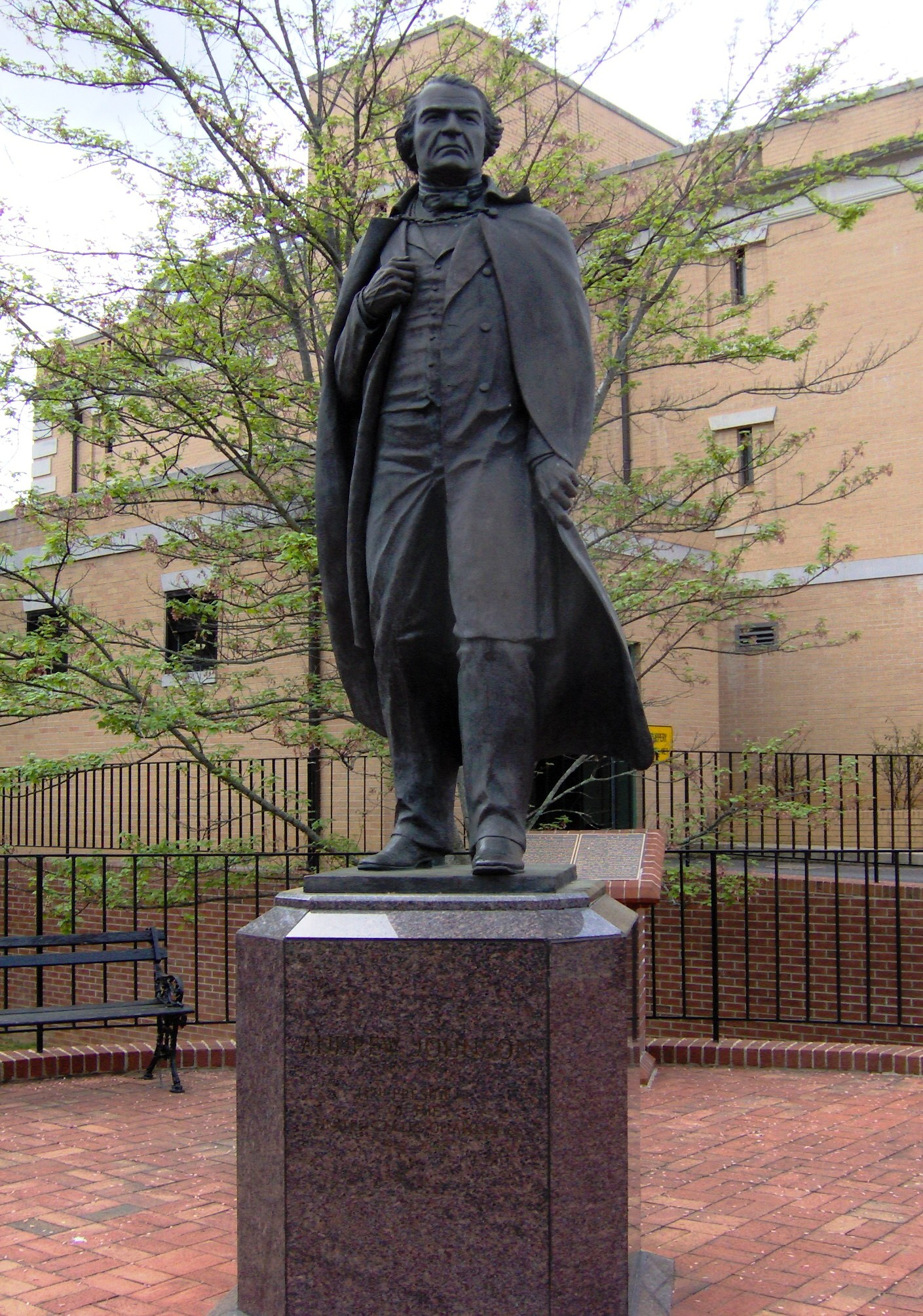
Statue of United States President Andrew Johnson at the Andrew Johnson National Historic Site

Andrew Johnson, the 17th President of the United States, spent much of his active life in Greeneville. In 1826, Johnson arrived in Greeneville after fleeing an apprenticeship in Raleigh. Johnson chose to remain in Greeneville after learning that the town's tailor was planning to retire. Johnson purchased the tailor shop, which he moved from Main Street to its present location at the corner of Depot and College streets. Johnson married a local girl, Eliza McCardle, in 1827. The two were married by Mordecai Lincoln (1778–1851), who was Greene County's Justice of the Peace. He was a cousin of Abraham Lincoln, under whom Johnson would serve as vice president.

In the late 1820s, a local artisan named Blackstone McDannel often stopped by Johnson's tailor shop to debate issues of the day, especially the Indian Removal, which Johnson opposed. Johnson and McDannel decided to debate the issue publicly. The interest sparked by this debate led Johnson, McDannel, and several others to form a local debate society. The experience and influence Johnson gained in debating local issues helped him get elected to the Greeneville City Council in 1829. He was elected mayor of Greeneville in 1834, although he resigned after just a few months in office to pursue a position in the Tennessee state legislature, which he attained the following year. As Johnson rose through the ranks of political office in state and national government, he used his influence to help Greeneville constituents obtain government positions, among them his long-time supporter, Sam Milligan, who was appointed to the Court of Claims in Washington, D.C.

Whilst Andrew Johnson was away from home, during his vice-presidency, both Union and Confederate armies often used his home as a place to stay and rest during their travel. Soldiers left graffiti on the walls of Johnson's home. Confederate soldiers left notes on the walls expressing their displeasure, to put it delicately, of Johnson. Evidence of this can still be seen at the Andrew Johnson home. Andrew Johnson had to almost completely renovate his home after he returned home from Washington, D.C.

The Andrew Johnson National Historic Site, located in Greeneville, was listed on the National Register of Historic Places in 1963. Contributing properties include Johnson's tailor shop at the corner of Depot and College streets. The site also maintains Johnson's house on Main Street and the Andrew Johnson National Cemetery (atop Monument Hill to the south). A replica of Johnson's birth home and a life-size statue of Johnson have been placed across the street from the visitor center and tailor shop.

=== Indian Wars ===
Buffalo Soldiers originally were members of the 10th Cavalry Regiment of the United States Army, formed on September 21, 1866, at Fort Leavenworth, Kansas. This nickname was given to the Black Cavalry by Native American tribes who fought in the Indian Wars. The term eventually became synonymous with all of the African-American regiments formed in 1866. Greeneville was home to at least four men who bravely served the country as "Buffalo Soldiers".

=== George Clem School ===
In 1887, with assistance from the African Methodist Episcopal Zion Church, the George Clem School was organized as Greeneville College. In 1932, the Greeneville Board of Education leased the property to provide public education for Negroes. Three years later, George Clem was appointed principal. Consisting of grades one through ten, the school was renamed Greeneville College High School. In 1937, the 11th grade was added. A year later, the school became an accredited four-year school. In 1939, the city purchased the school and renamed it the George Clem School. A decade later, the original building was demolished and the present building was erected in 1950. The school closed in 1965 when the public schools desegregated, and it became the location of the Greeneville City Schools Central Office. The George Clem School is often overlooked when talking about Greeneville history. Topics such as Sam Doak, the death of General Morgan, and Andrew Johnson are often the focal points when learning about Greeneville. The George Clem School is something the town should promote and be proud of. This history shows the accomplishments of the black community in Greeneville through the years. There is now a non profit organization in Greeneville by the name of George Clem Multicultural Alliance that helps honor the history of the school. The George Clem Multicultural Alliance is a non-profit 501(c)(3), public benefit, & exclusively charitable organization dedicated to supporting civic pride & cultural diversity awareness through various means within Wesley Heights community, and Greeneville/Greene County at large

=== Magnavox ===
From 1947 to 2005, Magnavox—an electronics manufacturer best known for its television sets—operated its main three facilities in Greeneville. Magnavox was at one time the largest employer of Greeneville, employing more than 5,000 workers. Eight years after the first plant opened, Magnavox workers voted to form a union through the IBEW. In 1974, the facilities and the Magnavox company were acquired by the Dutch electronics giant Philips. Throughout the 1980s and early 1990s, the Greeneville facility saw a fluctuation and drops in employment. In 1997, Phillips sold its facilities to Knoxville businessmen George Taylor and Charles White, who established it as Five Rivers Electronic Innovations, LLC. In 2005, Five Rivers closed the former Magnavox plant after declaring bankruptcy. Before its shuttering, the Five Rivers facility was the site of the last television manufactured in the United States, which is now on display in the Greeneville-Greene County History Museum.

=== 2011 tornado outbreak ===
On April 27, 2011, the rural community of Camp Creek south of Greeneville was severely affected by an EF3 tornado in the 2011 Super Outbreak. Six people were killed and 220 were injured by the tornado that either damaged or destroyed over 175 homes. Two hours later, Horse Creek, southeast of Greeneville, was also hit by an EF3 tornado, with the path travelling alongside and later crossing the earlier Camp Creek event as it moved into Washington County. Another 60-65 homes were either damaged or destroyed, and around 25 farms sustained heavy structural damage. Two more people were killed by that tornado, with an estimated 70 more being injured. A total of seven were killed in Greene County, with an eighth fatality in Washington County.

=== Downtown revitalization ===
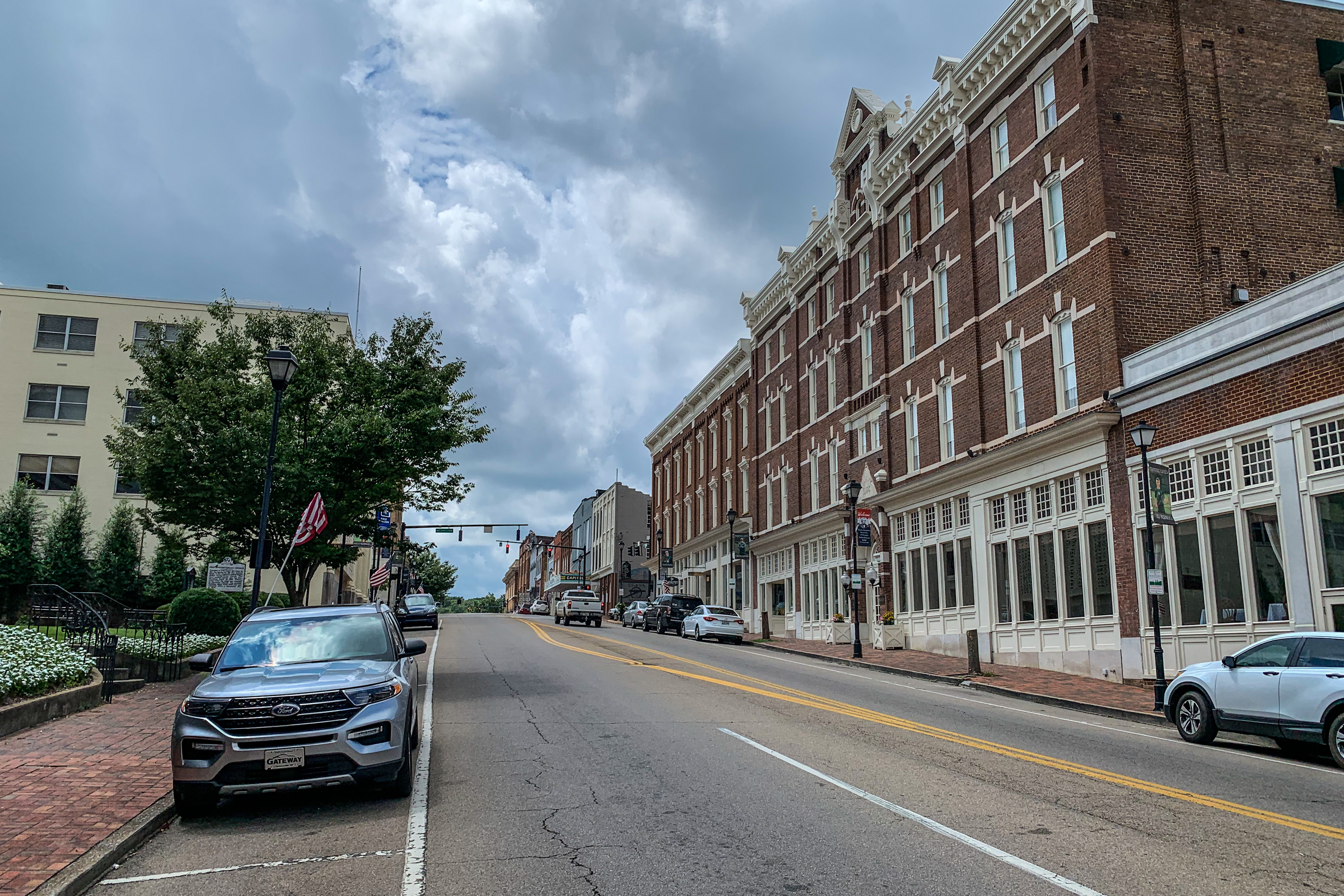
Downtown Greeneville and the General Morgan Inn on Main Street in 2020

In 2018, town officials, with the cooperation of a development and urban design firm, began efforts towards the redevelopment of the central business district of Greeneville. The project is projected to operate in several phases, projects proposed include: a farmer's market pavilion, a greenway along Richland Creek, an alley park, improved access for pedestrians and cyclists, parking garages, and the conversion of Depot Street into a street fair area. In October 2021, construction work began on a complete street-approach to Depot Street between Main Street and Irish Street in downtown Greeneville with enhanced pedestrian access. The project was completed in November 2023.

== Demographics ==
Historical population
Census	Pop.	Note	%±
1850	660		—
1870	1,039		—
1880	1,066		2.6%
1890	1,779		66.9%
1900	1,817		2.1%
1910	1,920		5.7%
1920	3,775		96.6%
1930	5,544		46.9%
1940	6,784		22.4%
1950	8,721		28.6%
1960	11,759		34.8%
1970	13,722		16.7%
1980	14,097		2.7%
1990	13,532		−4.0%
2000	15,198		12.3%
2010	15,062		−0.9%
2020	15,479		2.8%
2025 (est.)	16,141	▲	4.3%

=== 2020 census ===
Greeneville racial composition
Race	Number	Percentage
White (non-Hispanic)	12,855	83.05%
Black or African American (non-Hispanic)	717	4.63%
Native American	21	0.14%
Asian	152	0.98%
Pacific Islander	1	0.01%
Other/Mixed	726	4.69%
Hispanic or Latino	1,007	6.51%

As of the 2020 census, Greeneville had a population of 15,479. The median age was 42.8 years. 21.5% of residents were under the age of 18 and 22.7% of residents were 65 years of age or older. For every 100 females there were 88.3 males, and for every 100 females age 18 and over there were 83.3 males age 18 and over.

99.1% of residents lived in urban areas, while 0.9% lived in rural areas.

There were 6,623 households and 3,549 families in Greeneville, of which 27.6% had children under the age of 18 living in them. Of all households, 37.4% were married-couple households, 19.0% were households with a male householder and no spouse or partner present, and 37.7% were households with a female householder and no spouse or partner present. About 36.0% of all households were made up of individuals and 18.5% had someone living alone who was 65 years of age or older.

There were 7,503 housing units, of which 11.7% were vacant. The homeowner vacancy rate was 1.9% and the rental vacancy rate was 8.9%.

=== 2010 census ===
As of the 2010 census, there were 15,062 people; 6,478 households; 7,399 housing units; and 3,845 families in the town. (Note: For total population, see field "Sex and Age>Total Population"; for households, see field "Households by type>Total households"; for housing unites, see field "Housing occupancy>Total housing units"; for families, see field "Households by type>Total households>Family households".) The population density was 885.3 per square mile (341.8/km^{2}). The racial makeup of the city was 89.1% White, 5.6% African American, 0.2% Native American, 0.8% Asian, 0.0% Pacific Islander, 2.3% from other races, and 2% from two or more races. (Note: All information from the Race section of the table.) Hispanics or Latinos of any race were 4.4% of the population. (Note: See section "Hispanic or Latino>Total population>Hispanic or Latino (of any race)".)

=== 2000 census ===
There were 6,506 households, out of which 24.8% had children under the age of 18 living with them, 40.2% were married couples living together, 14.9% had a female householder with no husband present, and 40.6% were non-families. 36.1% of all households were made up of individuals, and 17.3% had someone living alone who was 65 years of age or older. The average household size was 2.2 and the average family size was 2.86.

The age distribution was 21.2% under 18 and 21% who were 65 or older. The median age was 42.6 years. The median income for a household in the city was $51,692. The per capita income for the city was $24,376. About 13.9% of the population was below the poverty line.

== Economy ==
=== Top employers ===
According to Greeneville Forward, a long-term growth plan published for the town in 2017, the top employers in the town are:

#	Employer	# of Employees
1	Walmart	916
2	Laughlin Memorial Hospital	800
3	American Greetings	542
4	Parker-Hannifin	450
5	Greeneville City Schools	448
6	John Deere	431
7	Worthington Industries	410
8	Ingles Markets	350
9	Town of Greeneville	240
10	Food City	216

Manufacturing remained as the top employing industry in Greeneville until the 1990s, after Magnavox, once the town's largest employer, shuttered its facilities in the town.

Retail is a major employer in Greeneville. The largest shopping center in Greeneville is Greeneville Commons which contains several national retailers. As of 2017, grocery stores in Greeneville include three Food City Supermarkets, two Ingles Markets, Dollar General Market, Sav-Mor Foods (a grocery store owned by Ingles Markets), Publix and Save-A-Lot. Walmart and Lowe's also have stores in Greeneville.

== Arts and culture ==
=== Festivals and fairs ===
There has been a fair in some form in Greene County since 1870 when the Farmers and Mechanics Association held its first exposition. The present Greene County Fair Association was incorporated in 1949. The Greene County Fair is recognized statewide as one of the best fairs of its size. In 2021, the Fair received the First Runner-Up Award in the AAA Division. In 2015, the Fair was recognized as the AAA Division Champion Fair in the state of Tennessee by the Tennessee Association of Fairs. In 2005, we were honored to receive the Tennessee Association of Fairs highest award, the “Champion of Champions” fair trophy, and in 2006, the Fair received the “Champion of Champions Premier Fair” award.

The town is home to the Street Dance on Davis celebration, which is held annually on the weekend before Aug. 8, in remembrance of Aug. 8, 1863, the date when Andrew Johnson freed his personal slaves at his home in Greeneville. This street dance is a celebration that includes live music, dancing in the streets, kids zones, and most importantly open dialogue that supports black history. In recent years, The George Clem Multicultural Alliance has been the host of this celebration. Although the celebration started as primarily involving the local African-American community, the event has expanded to celebrate the African-American community of East Tennessee.

The fair was also an inspiration for The Band Perry's song "Walk Me Down The Middle", which was featured on their eponymous debut album.

=== Historic sites ===
- Andrew Johnson National Historic Site
- Earnest Farms Historic District
- Greeneville Historic District
- Maden Hall Farm

== Sports ==
Greeneville is home to the Greeneville Flyboys, a collegiate summer baseball team of the Appalachian League, which was started in 2021. The team's home stadium is Pioneer Park on the campus of Tusculum College.

Professional baseball was first played in Greeneville by the Greeneville Burley Cubs in the Appalachian League in 1921. They remained in the league through 1925 and returned for a second stretch from 1938 to 1942. The Burley Cubs won the league championship in 1925 and 1938. They were followed in the same league by the Greeneville Astros, who played in the city from 2004 to 2017. They won the Appalachian League championship in 2004 and 2015. The Houston Astros, parent club of Greeneville, withdrew their affiliate from the Appalachian League after the 2017 season. The circuit's vacancy was filled by the Cincinnati Reds, who placed a Rookie-level affiliate in Greeneville known as the Greeneville Reds. In conjunction with a contraction of Minor League Baseball beginning with the 2021 season, the Appalachian League was reorganized as a collegiate summer baseball league, and the Reds were replaced by the Flyboys, a new franchise in the revamped league designed for rising college freshmen and sophomores.

== Parks and recreation ==
The Town of Greeneville Parks and Recreation Department maintains:

- Dogwood Park
- Ginny Kidwell Amphitheater at Dogwood Park
- Hardin Park
- Highland Hills Park
- J.J. Jones Memorial Park
- Veterans Memorial Park (Forest Park)
- Wesley Heights Park

== Government ==
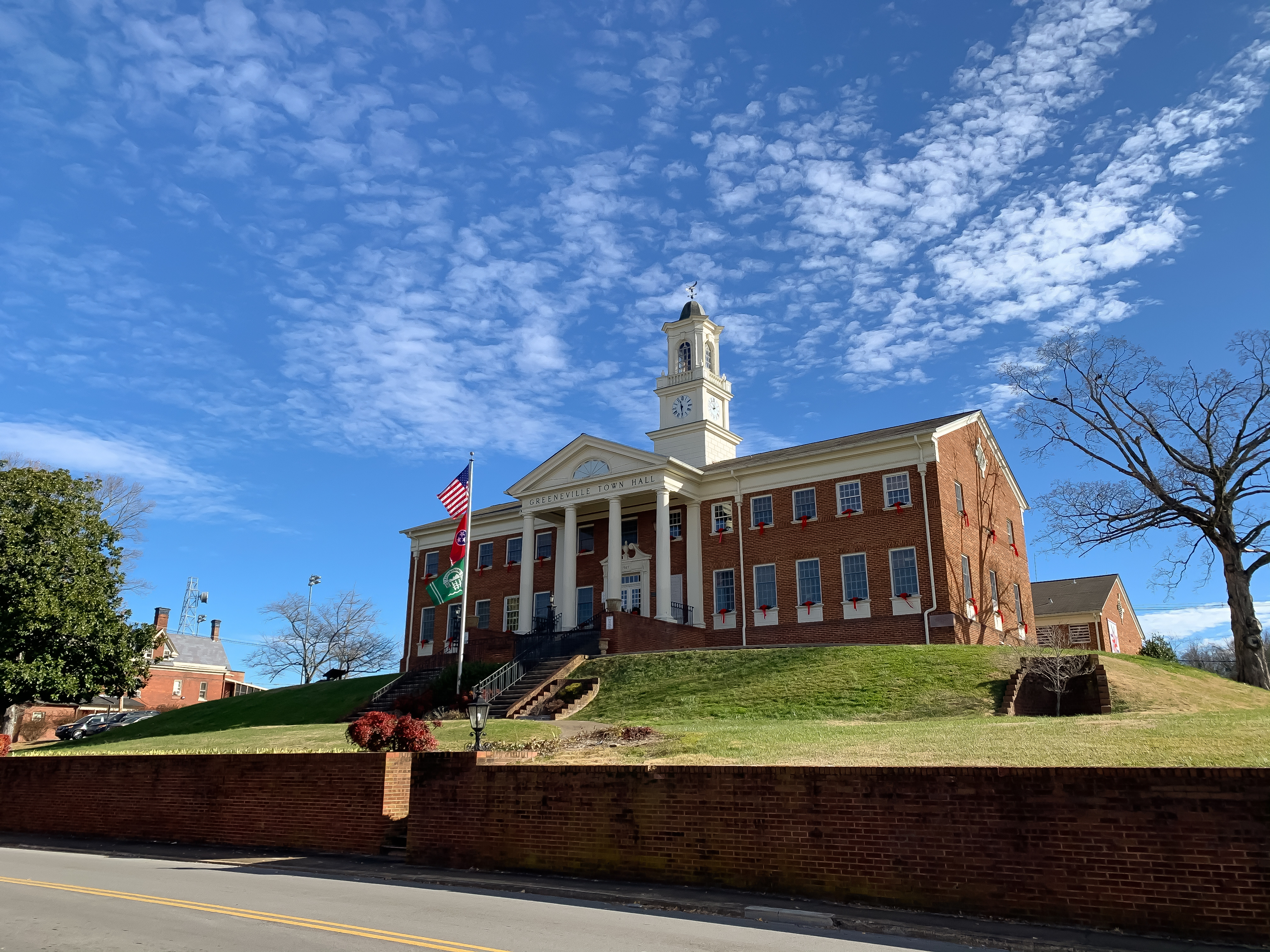
Greeneville Town Hall on College Street

=== Municipal ===
Greeneville is administered through a mayor/city council/city manager form of government. It previously had a mayor/board of aldermen/administrator form of government until April 18, 2023, when the then board of mayor and aldermen voted to change the town's charter.

The town has a mayor and four city council members, along with the city manager who is the chief administrative officer and is in charge of supervising all town employees and is required to develop an annual budget and present it to the mayor and council members. The following is a list of current officials as of April 2023:

- C. Calvin Doty– Mayor
- Scott Bullington – City Council Member
- Tim Ward – City Council Member
- Virginia "Ginny" Kidwell – City Council Member
- Tim Teague – City Council Member
- Todd Smith – City Manager

=== State ===
Greeneville is represented in the Tennessee House of Representatives in the 5th district, by Representative David Hawk, a Republican.

In the Tennessee State Senate, Greeneville is represented by the 1st district, by Senator Steve Southerland, also a Republican.

=== Federal ===
Greeneville is represented in the United States House of Representatives by Republican Diana Harshbarger of the 1st congressional district.

== Education ==
Greeneville is home to Walters State Niswonger Campus, which was expanded in 2019.

Tusculum University is located in nearby Tusculum.

The Greeneville City School District, the school district for areas in the city limits, operates:

- Eastview Elementary School - Grades PK-5
- Greene Technology Center - Grades 9-12 (Also contains adult education classes and is associated with the Tennessee College of Applied Technology at Morristown)
- Greeneville High School - Grades 9–12
- Greeneville Middle School - Grades 6–8
- Hal Henard Elementary School - Grades PK-5
- Highland Elementary School - Grades PK-5
- Tusculum View Elementary School - Grades PK-5

== Media ==
=== Television ===
Greeneville is part of both the Knoxville DMA and the Tri-Cities DMA. One station has Greeneville listed as its city of license (WEMT-Fox Tri-Cities). WGRV (AM) also has a television station on Comcast Cable channel 18. The channel simulcasts WGRV's live newscasts and other live programs and shows local events.

=== Radio ===
Greeneville has three radio stations: WGRV (AM), WIKQ-FM, and WSMG-AM.

=== Newspaper ===
The Greeneville and Greene County area are served by The Greeneville Sun, a daily newspaper published Monday through Saturday. The Greeneville Sun also publishes a free newspaper, The Greeneville Neighbor News, which spotlights arts and entertainment.

== Infrastructure ==
=== Healthcare ===
Greeneville has one hospital, which is part of Ballad Health.

- Greeneville Community Hospital East, formerly Laughlin Memorial Hospital

Greeneville also has many nursing facilities, including: Life Care Center of Greeneville, Laughlin Healthcare Center, Signature Healthcare of Greeneville, Morning Pointe, Wellington Place owned by Brookdale Senior Living, Maxim Healthcare Services and Comcare.

== Notable people ==
- Dale Alexander, professional baseball player; 1932 American League batting champion
- Thomas D. Arnold, U.S. representative from Tennessee
- William E. Bishop (1932–2003), member of the New Jersey General Assembly
- Elias Nelson Conway, governor of Arkansas
- William Crutchfield (1824–1890), Southern Unionist and U.S representative from Tennessee
- Samuel Doak (1749–1830), Presbyterian minister, pioneer; founded earliest schools and churches in East Tennessee. President of Washington College 1795–1818, he moved to Greeneville and taught at Tusculum Academy, later Tusculum College, from 1818 to 1830. Delegate to the "Lost State" of Franklin which convened in Greeneville.
- Col. Joseph Hardin (1734–1801), Speaker of the House for the State of Franklin; trustee of Greeneville (now Tusculum) College.
- Andrew Johnson, president of the United States and mayor of Greeneville
- Elbert L. Kinser (1922–1945), U.S. Marine Corps sergeant and Medal of Honor recipient
- Frank Little, opera singer
- Samuel Milligan (1814–1874), Tennessee state representative and judge of the Court of Claims
- Park Overall, actress, most notable for Empty Nest, a Golden Girls spin-off.
- Rance Pless Baseball Pro. Won 2 minor league batting crowns, 1952 & 1955; AAA MVP 1955; member of the 1956 Kansas City A's. After retirement from pro ball, employed by Magnavox.
- Samuel R. Rodgers (1798–1866), Southern Unionist and speaker of the Tennessee Senate
- Oliver Perry Temple, 19th-century Knoxville attorney and economic promoter
- Malcolm Wheeler-Nicholson, entrepreneur and founder of National Allied Publications, which would later evolve into DC Comics. Wheeler-Nicholson was a Greeneville native and lived there for several years before his family moved away in his early childhood. He is widely credited as being the creator of the modern comic book.

== Gallery ==
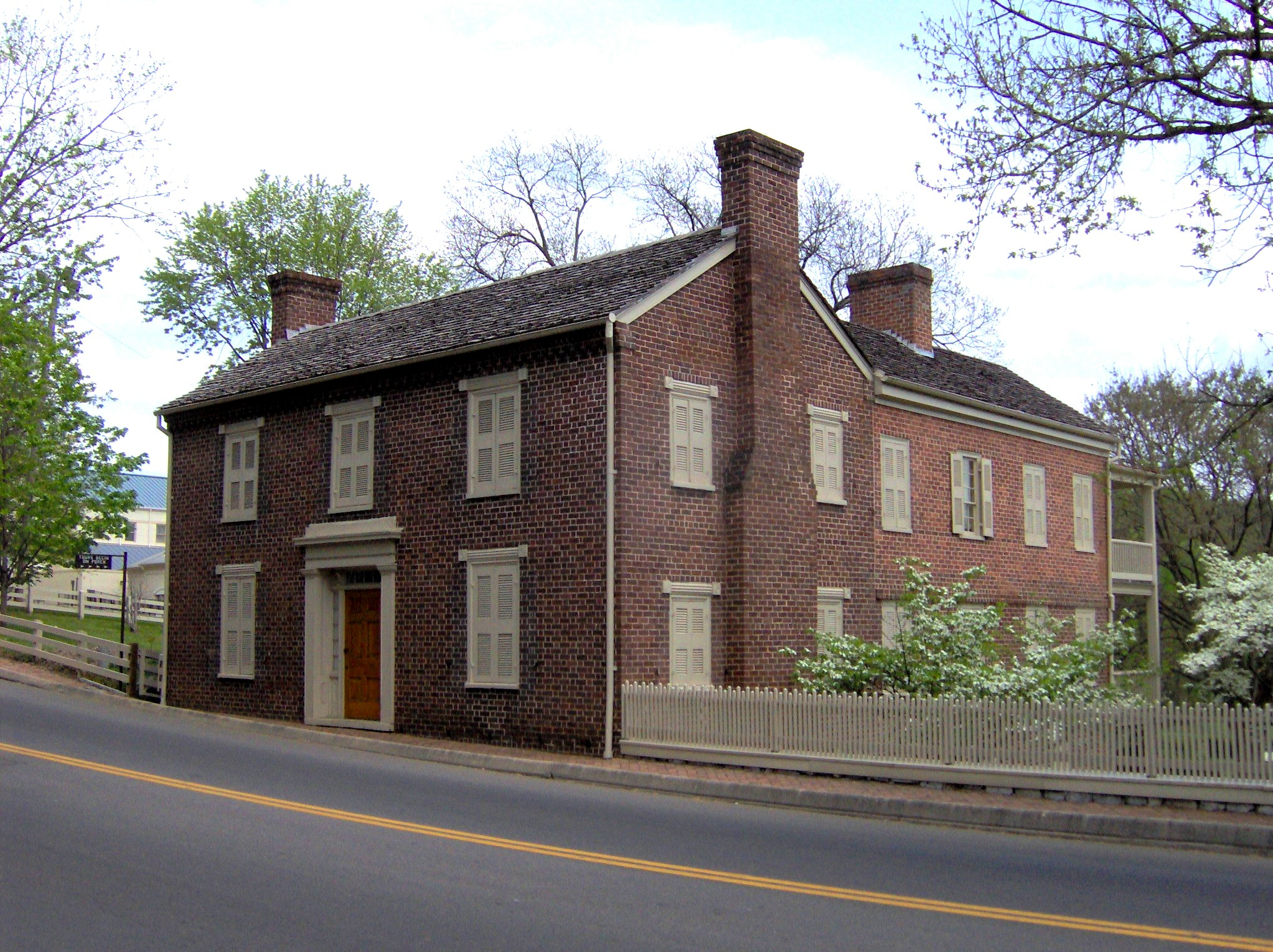
Andrew Johnson House on Main Street

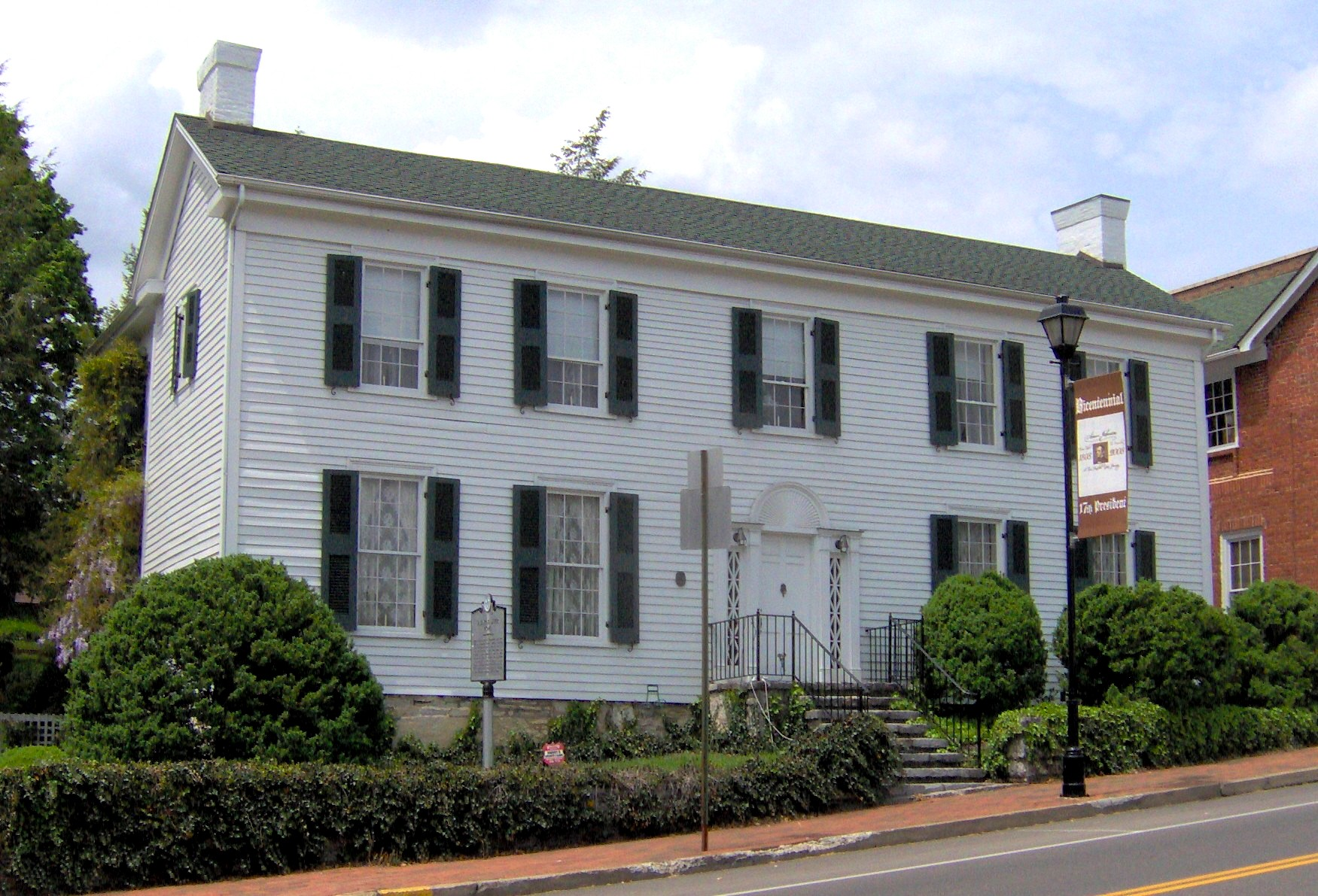
Susong House, built c. 1795 by Valentine Sevier

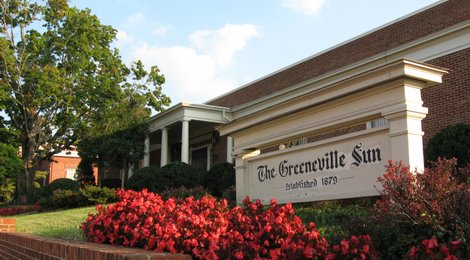
The Greeneville Sun, 121 W. Summer Street

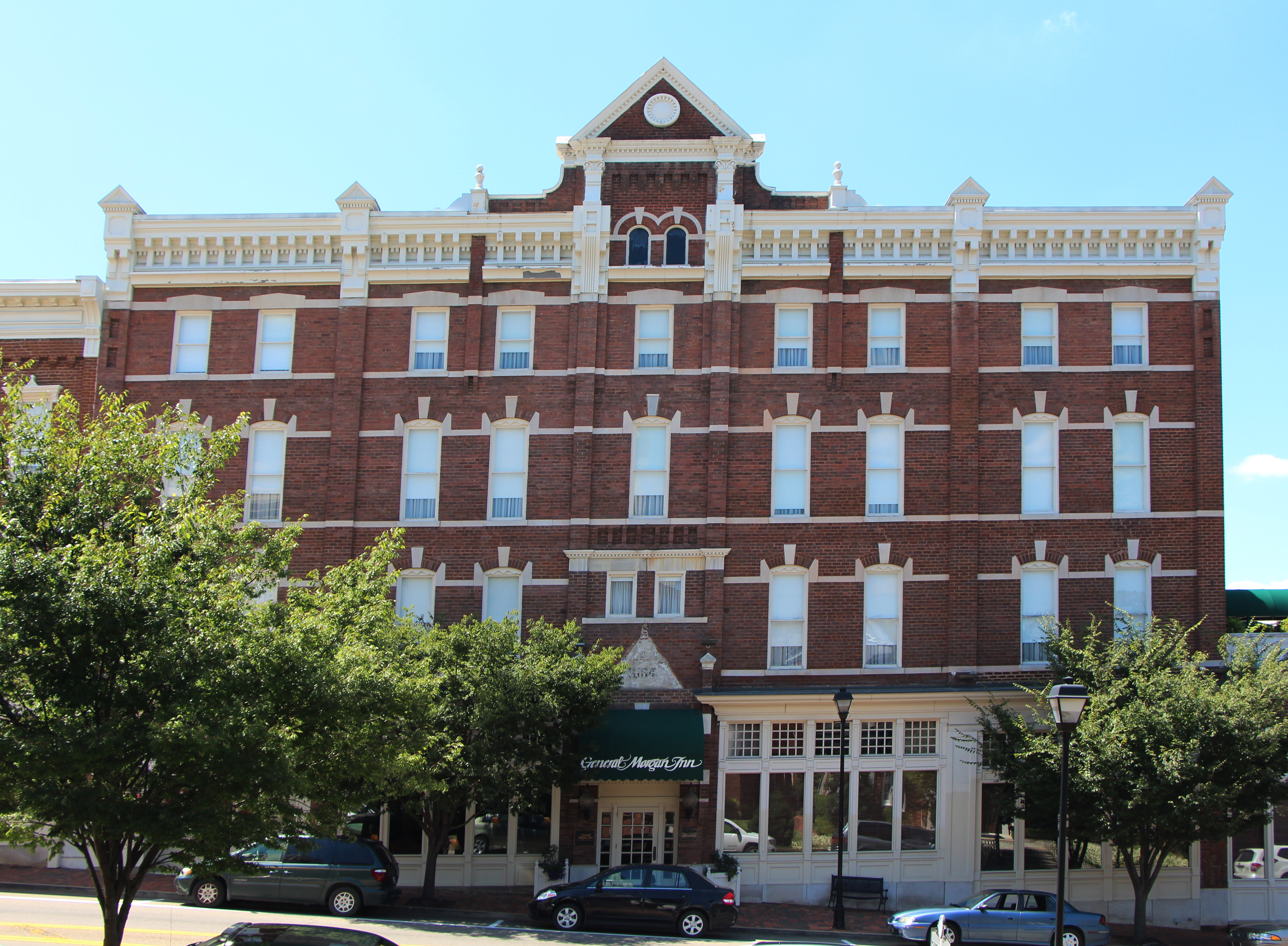
Hotel Brumley, now General Morgan Inn & Conference Center, 111 North Main Street

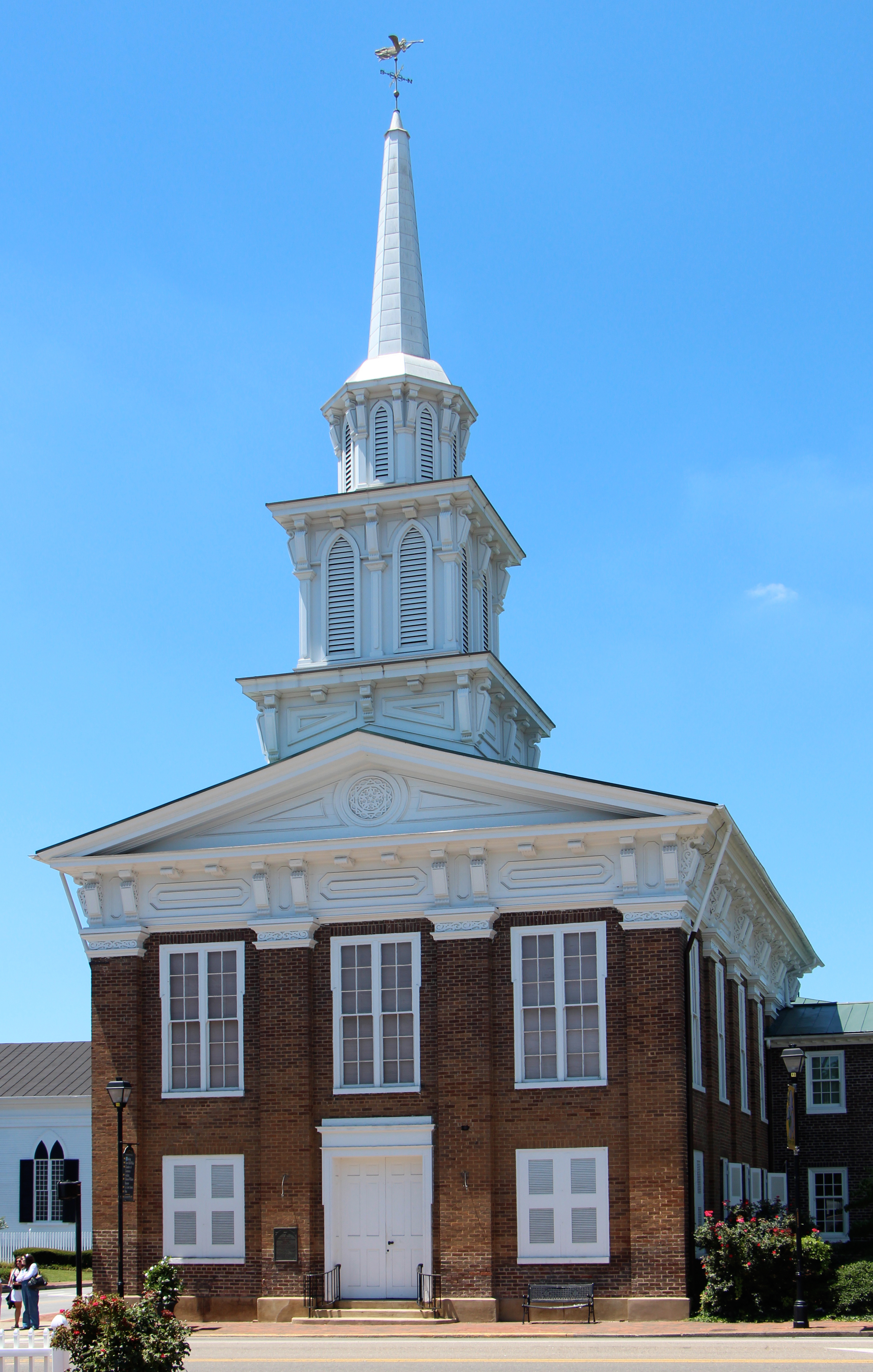
Cumberland Presbyterian Church, 201 North Main Street

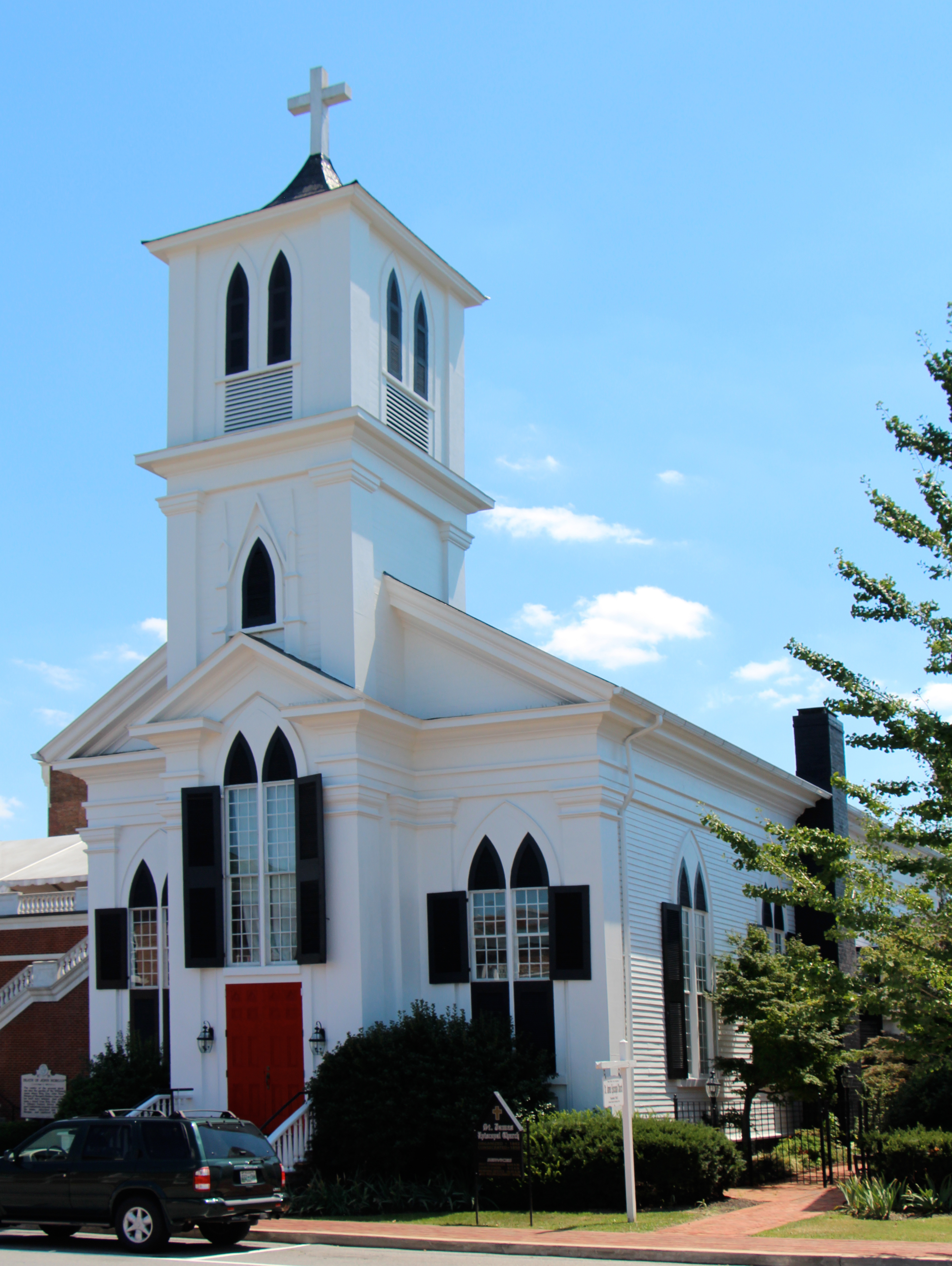
St. James Episcopal Church, 105 North Church Street

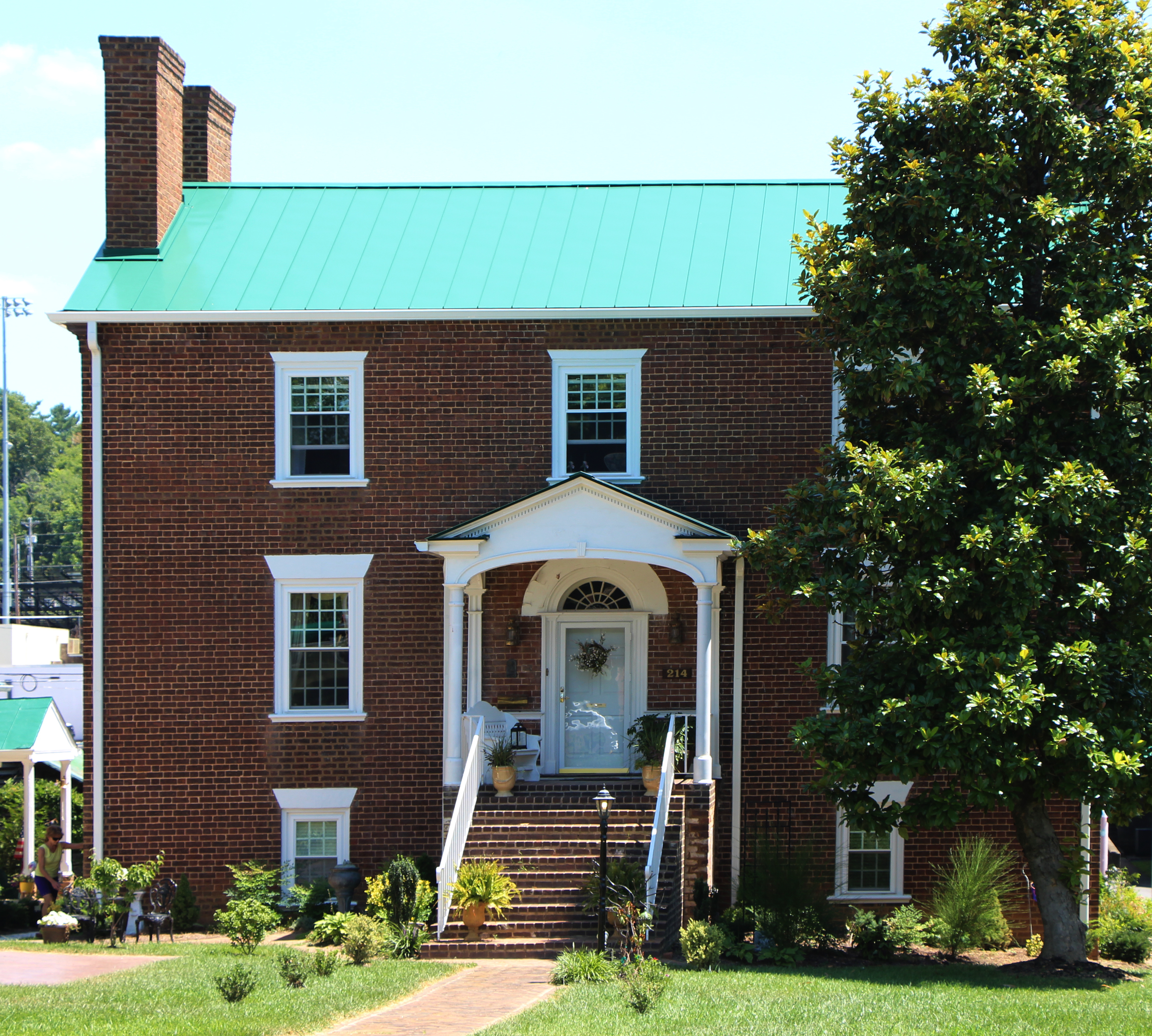
Valentine Sevier House, 214 North Main Street

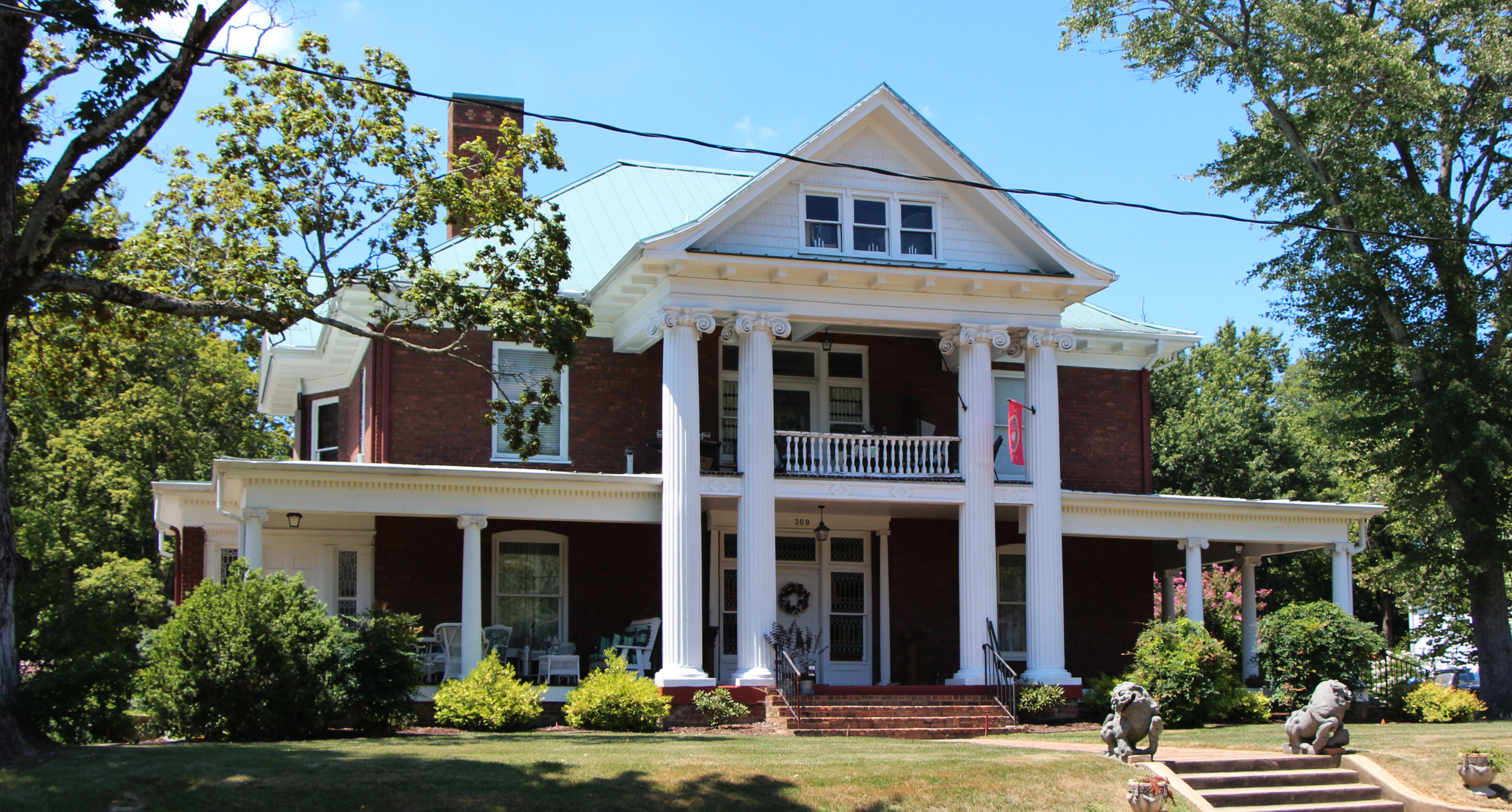
Doughty House, 309 North Main Street

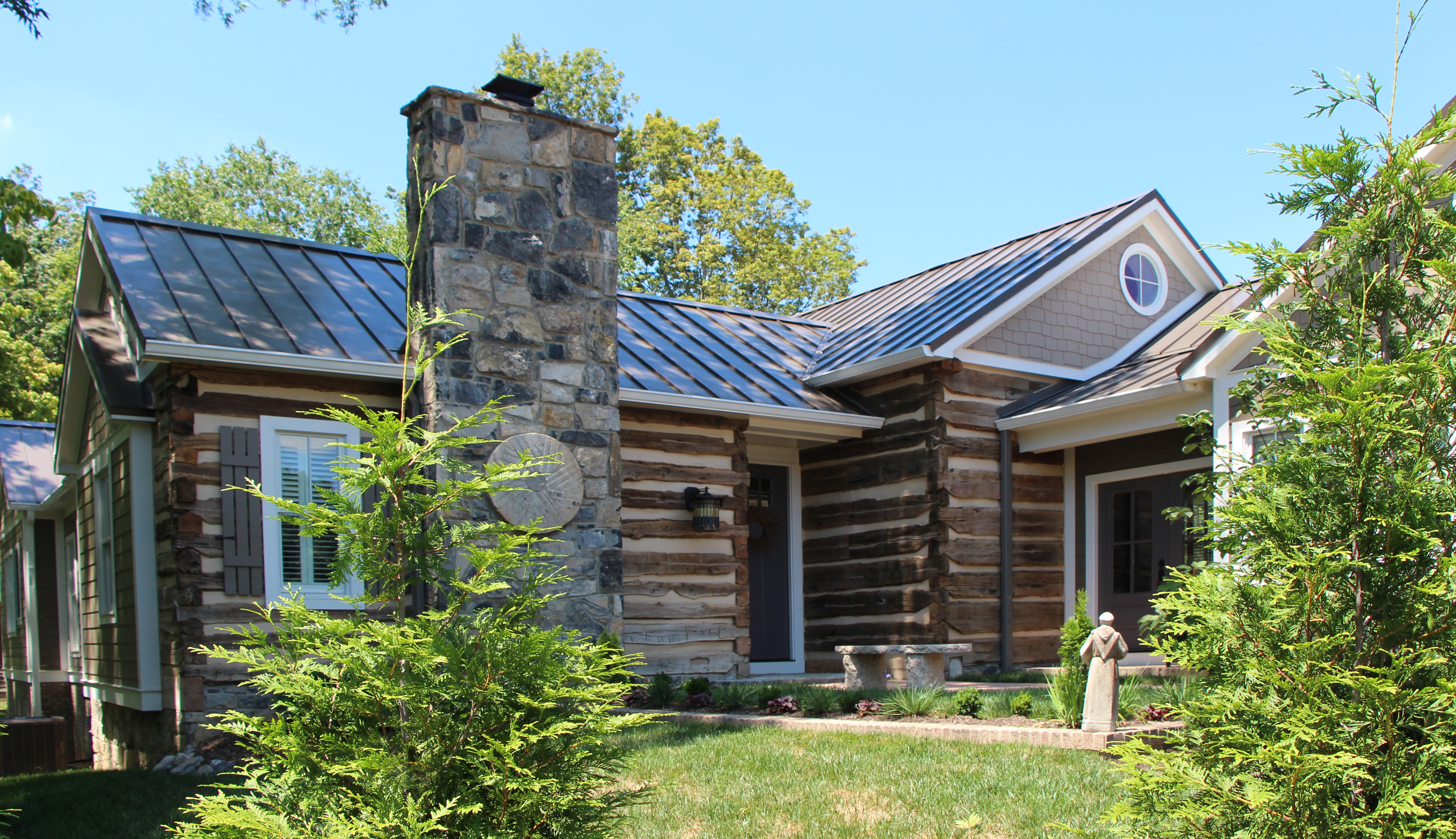
Antrium-log-cabin, 307 North Main Street

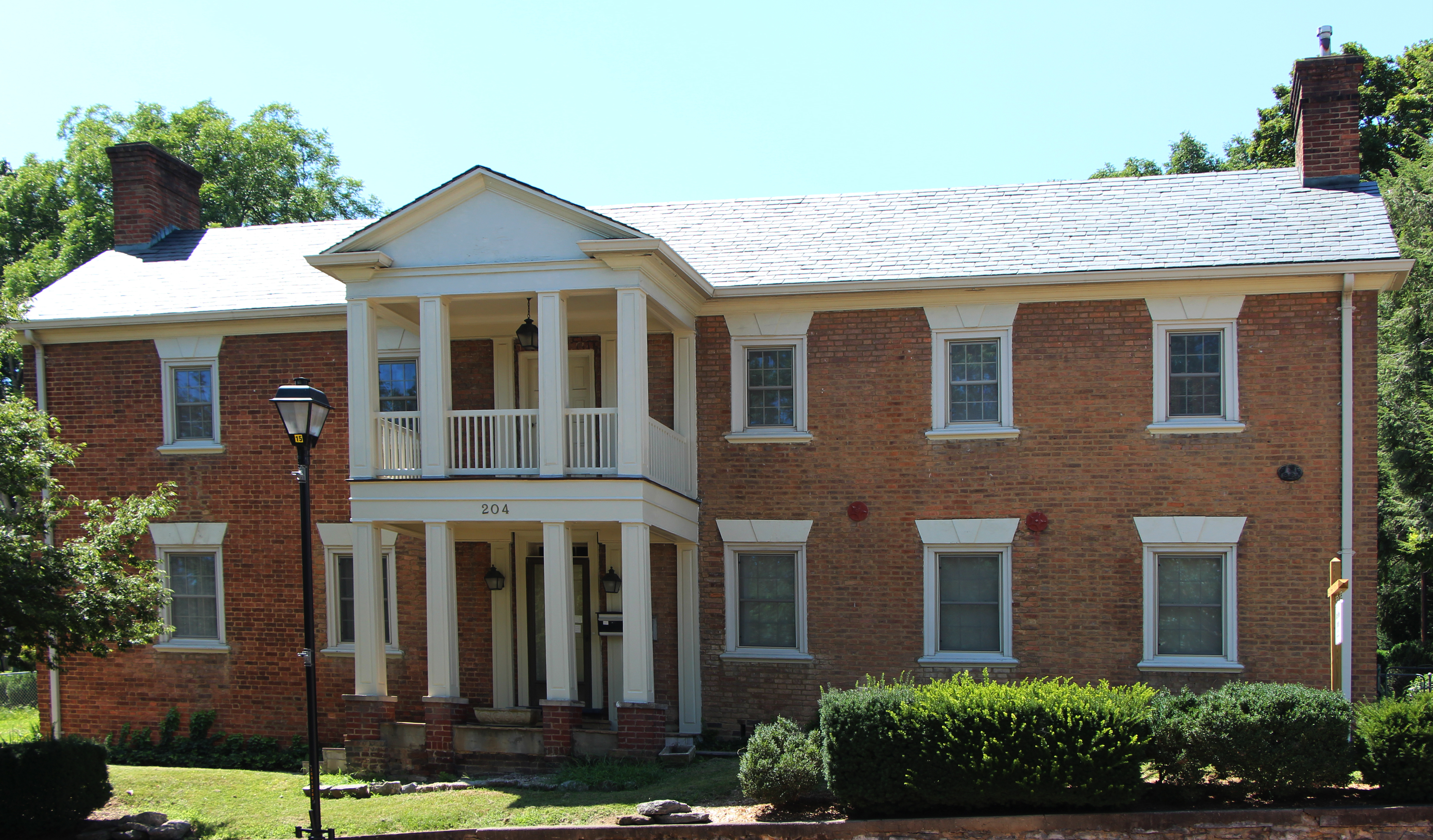
Clawson Home, 204 South Main Street

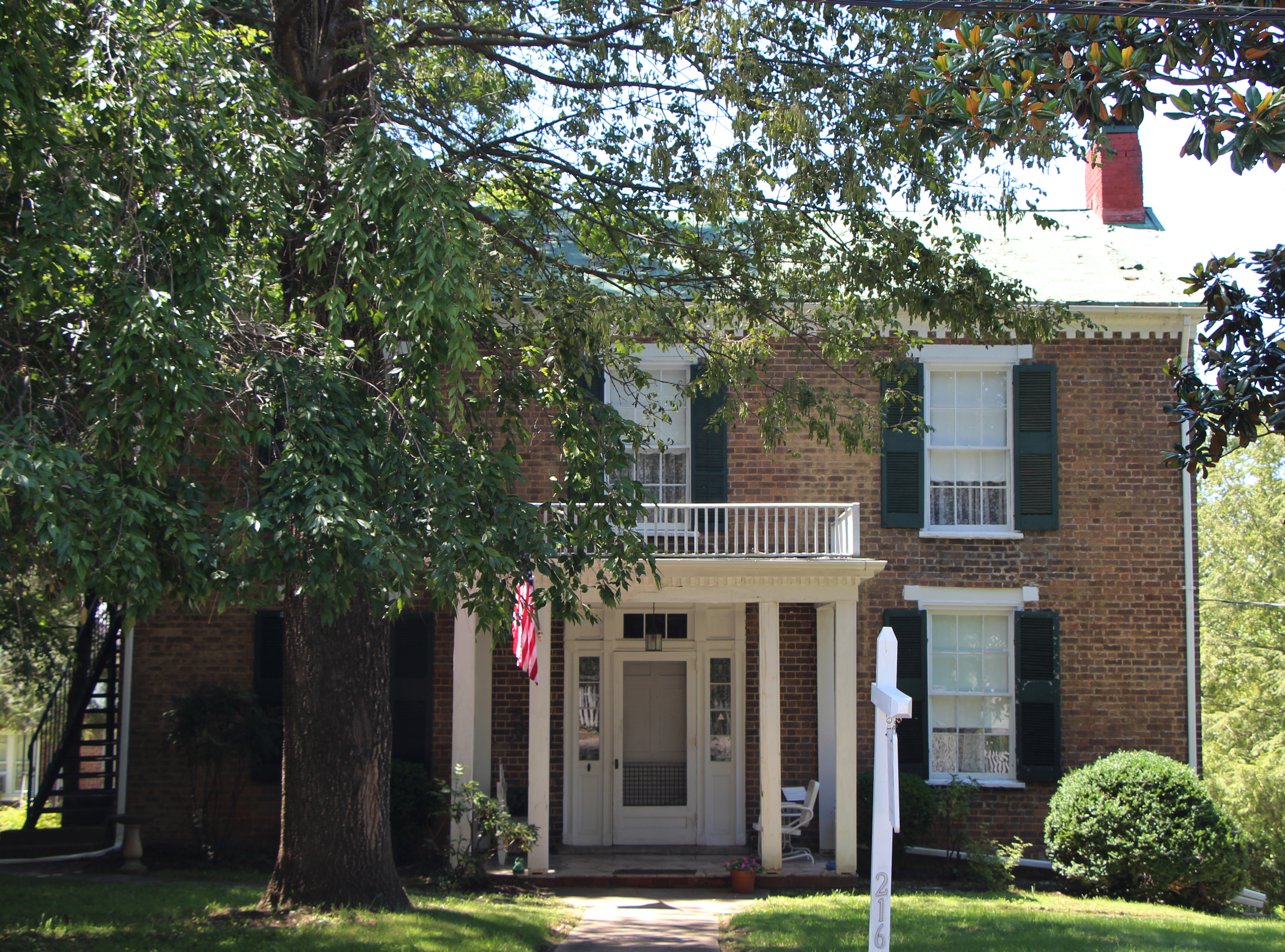
Lowry Snapp House, 216 West Irish Street

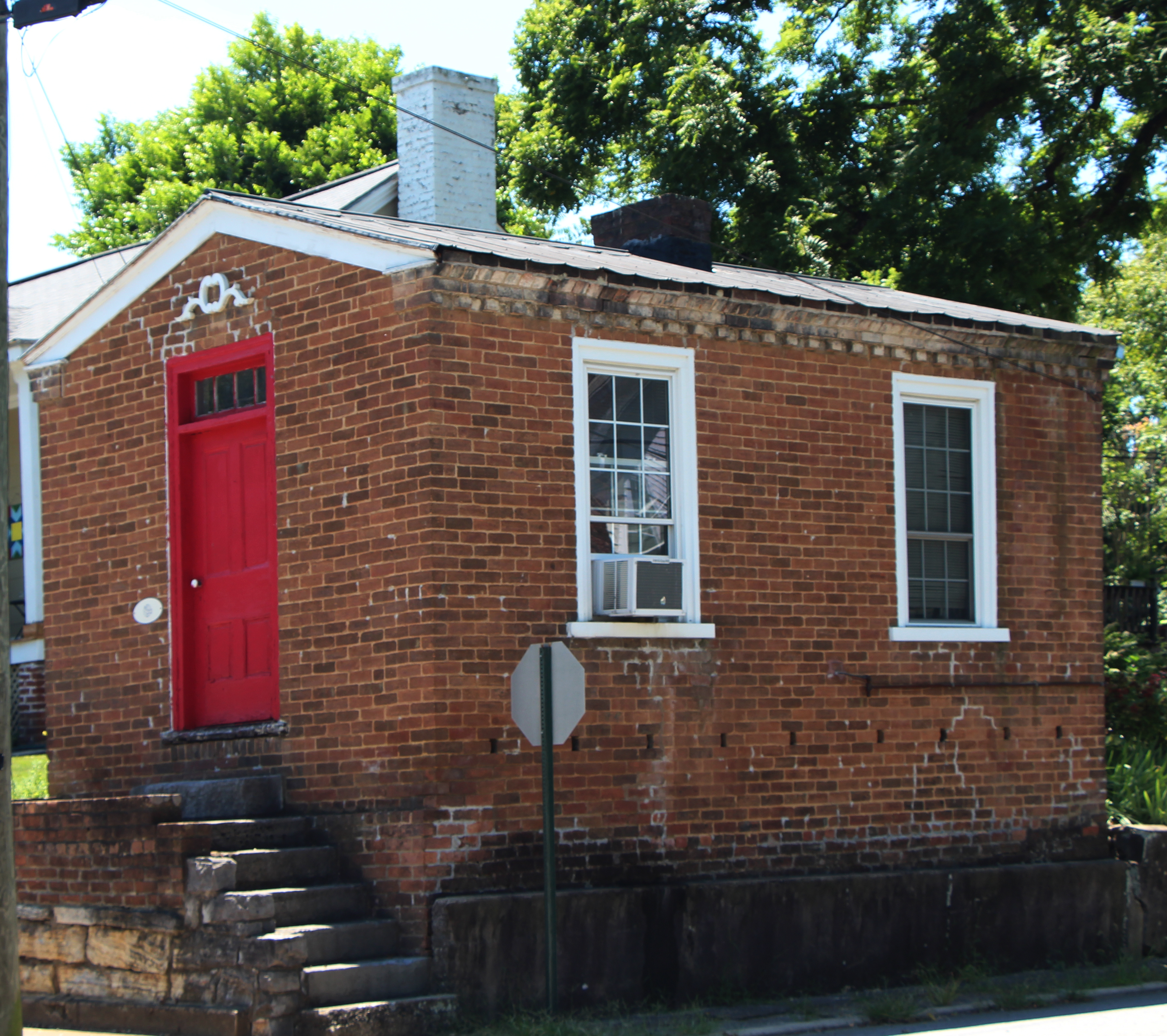
Armitage-McKee Law Office, Corner of McKee and Irish Streets

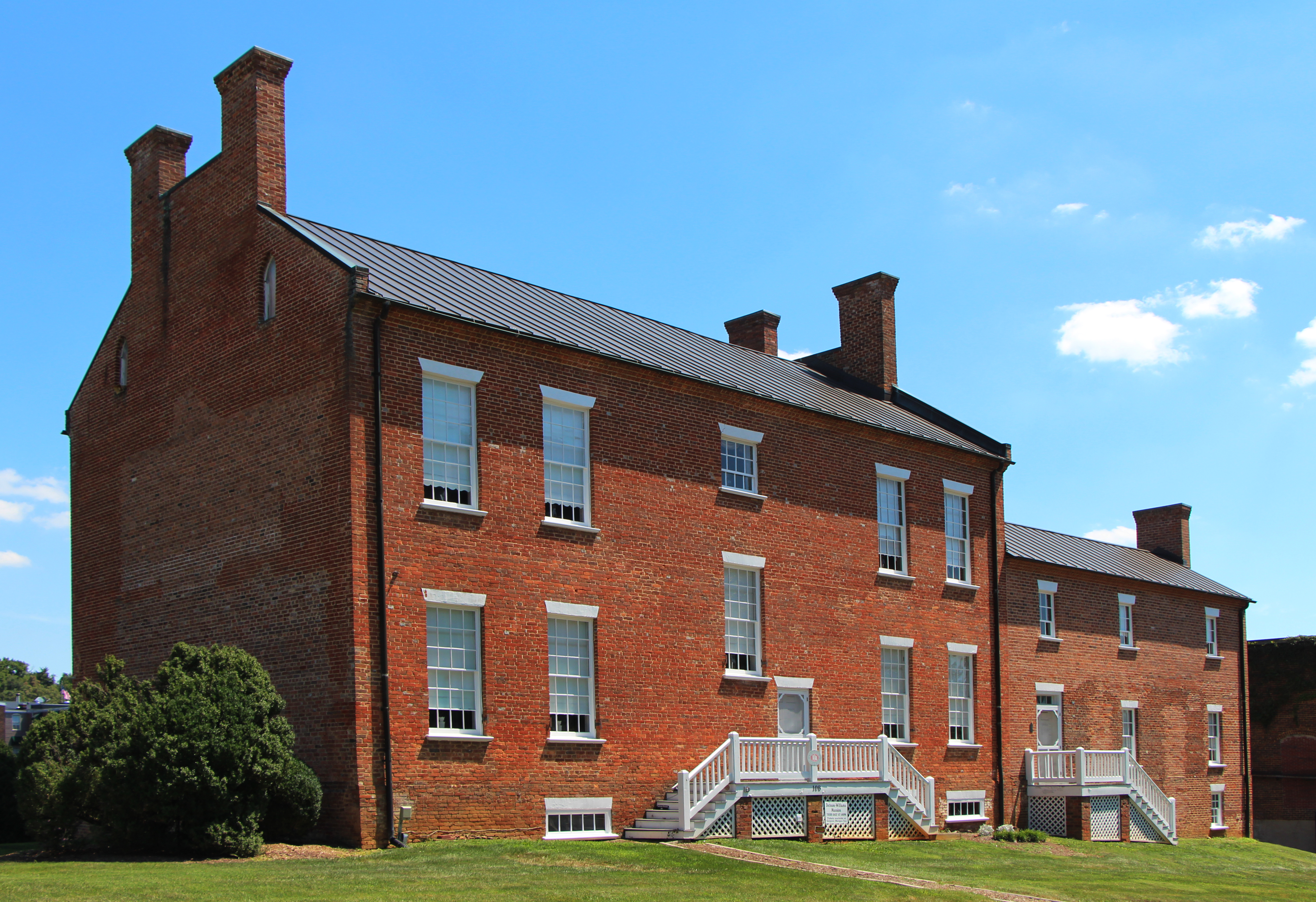
Dickson Williams Mansion, 106 North Irish Street
