= The Greeneville Sun =

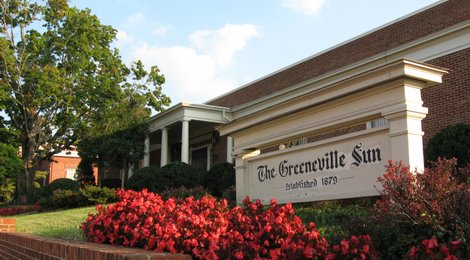
- Type: Daily newspaper
- Owner: Adams MultiMedia
- Founded: 1879
- Language: English
- Headquarters: 121 W. Summer Street
- City: Greeneville, Tennessee
- Circulation: 9,500 (as of 2019)
- Website: greenevillesun.com

The Greeneville Sun is a daily newspaper in Greeneville, Tennessee.

== Overview ==
The award-winning newspaper has a circulation of 14,390 for each of five weekday editions and 15,218 for the Saturday-Sunday edition.

The Sun also produces The Greeneville Neighbor News each Wednesday. With a circulation of 11,065, the free publication spotlights arts and entertainment in the East Tennessee region.

The Greeneville Sun is part of Greeneville Publishing Co., a division of Jones Media Inc. Jones Media was acquired by Adams Publishing Group in 2016.

Gregg K. Jones serves as publisher; John E. Cash, general manager; Michael S. Reneau, editor; Artie Wehenkel, advertising director; Dale Long, circulation director; and Brian Cutshall, online director.
