= Greening =

Process of incorporating more environmentally friendly behaviors or systems

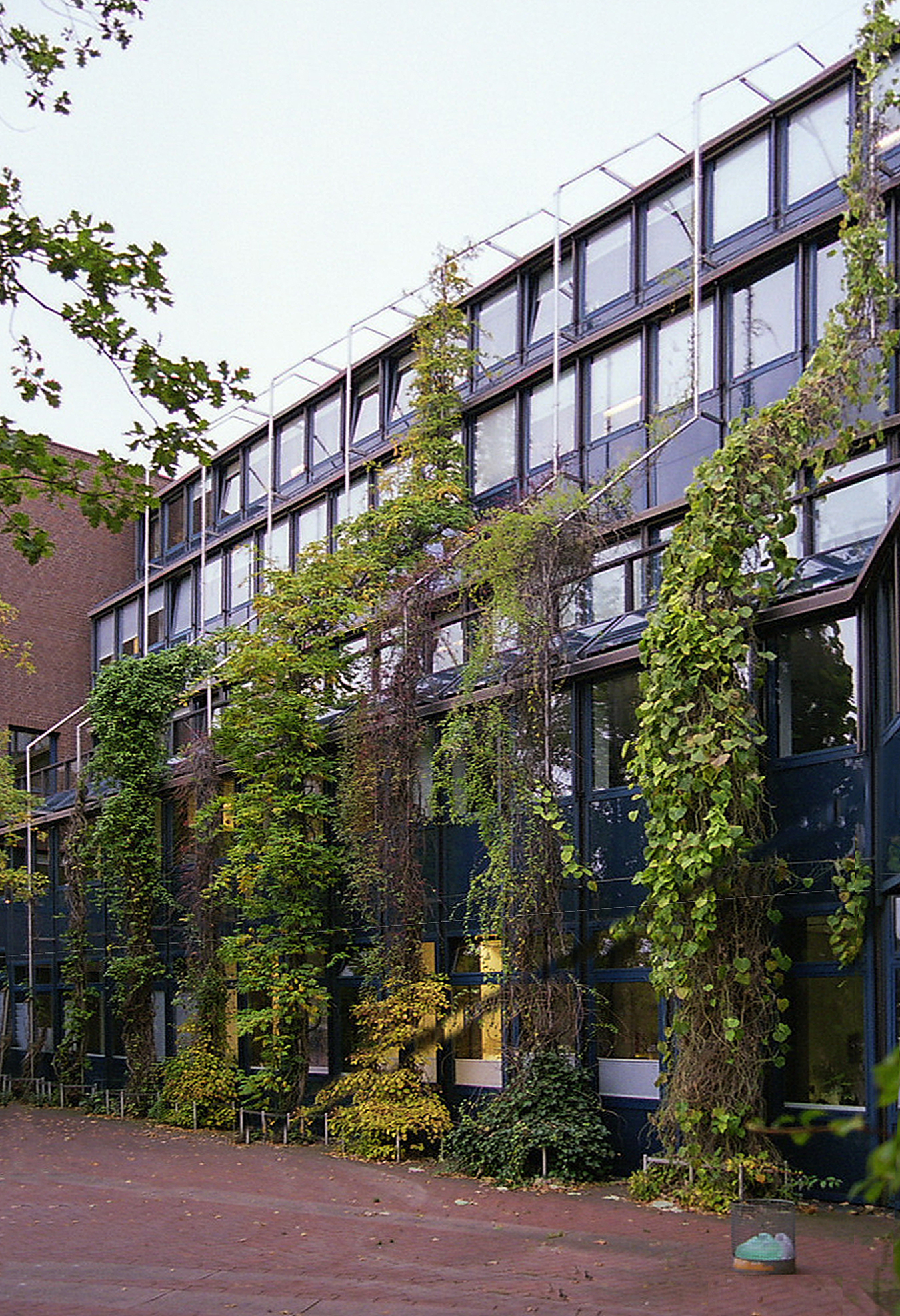
Facade greening with various supporting climbing plants on climbing aids

Greening is the process of transforming living environments, and also artifacts such as a space, a lifestyle or a brand image, into a more environmentally friendly version (i.e. 'greening your home' or 'greening your office'). The act of greening generally involves incorporating more environmentally friendly systems into one's environment, such as the home, work place, and general lifestyle.

Greening is also a general term for the appropriate selection and planting of plants on, in, or next to buildings and in public parks. The goal of greening is usually a combination of environmental benefits and improving the visual design of surfaces, for example, a green wall or green roof, as well as the creation of green spaces. This usually requires technical measures such as earthworks or supporting climbing plants. Furthermore, permanent care and irrigation are usually necessary to maintain the greened environment. In some areas there are normative requirements for the planning and execution of greening, for example roadsides greening. In soil bioengineering, plants with technical functions may be needed.

Measures such as the recultivation of heaps, plantations as part of a compensatory measure or, in tiller forestry, the planting of vegetation are distinguished from greening. In professional parlance, the sowing or planting of agricultural crops is also referred to as crop growing or occasionally as field cultivation. The term sowing is used for lawns.

The greening of deserts is a particularly difficult task. If it is sustainable, it is the most effective measure for the economic development of arid areas, decreases global warming, and also improves the local climate. The state of Israel has long been a pioneer in this field in the Negev. A project between 1991 and 2011 and supported by, among others, the forests of German states provided 450,000 trees for the desert city of Beersheba. Another major reforestation (greening) project is China's Green Wall, which aims to reduce the increasing devastation of entire regions in the north and west of the People's Republic of China.

== Green qualities and assessment ==
These "green" qualities include, but are not limited to:

- reduced toxicity
- re-usability
- energy efficiency
- responsible packaging and labelling
- recycled content
- intelligent design
- responsible manufacturing techniques
- reduction of personal environmental hazards
- alleviating heat island effect

== Health benefits of greening ==
Exposure to greening initiatives has proven to achieve great health benefits for people of all ages. Greening can alleviate stressors of an urban environment, providing more opportunities to experience tranquility, reduce noise, and induce cooling effects. Exposure to greening initiatives can benefit both physical and mental health and can lead to more environmental awareness. Greening includes habitat restoration, planting trees, food gardening and naturalization.

=== Health benefits of greening in schools ===
Children have been a particular focus in this area of research due to the increasingly limited access to green spaces and nature. In urban areas, parents or guardians may favor playing indoors versus outdoors based on the perception of and concerns for safety. For example, families who live farther away from green spaces are more likely to push for indoor activities because of close proximity to busy roads or construction sites.

On average, children in the United States spend about 1,000 hours a year in school. Therefore, schools are an excellent tool for greening initiatives that involve children in urban spaces. Habitat restoration, gardening, naturalization and rewilding efforts in schools provide children with the opportunity to connect with nature. In a study conducted in Finland, researchers found that adding green to the school yard increased passion for outdoor activity as well as creativity and spontaneity in 3 to 5-year-old children. In Barcelona, Spain, school greening initiatives provided more opportunities for children to spend time outside and reduced inequities in residential access. In current efforts to limit exposure to COVID-19 and contact between individuals, school yards have become an even more important tool to promote social learning and education. Benefits of greening initiatives include electricity cost savings due to cooling technology of greening, improving the environment, providing healthy educational space, and more learning opportunities. It can help alleviate the stressors associated with urban climates and benefit both mental and physical health of children.

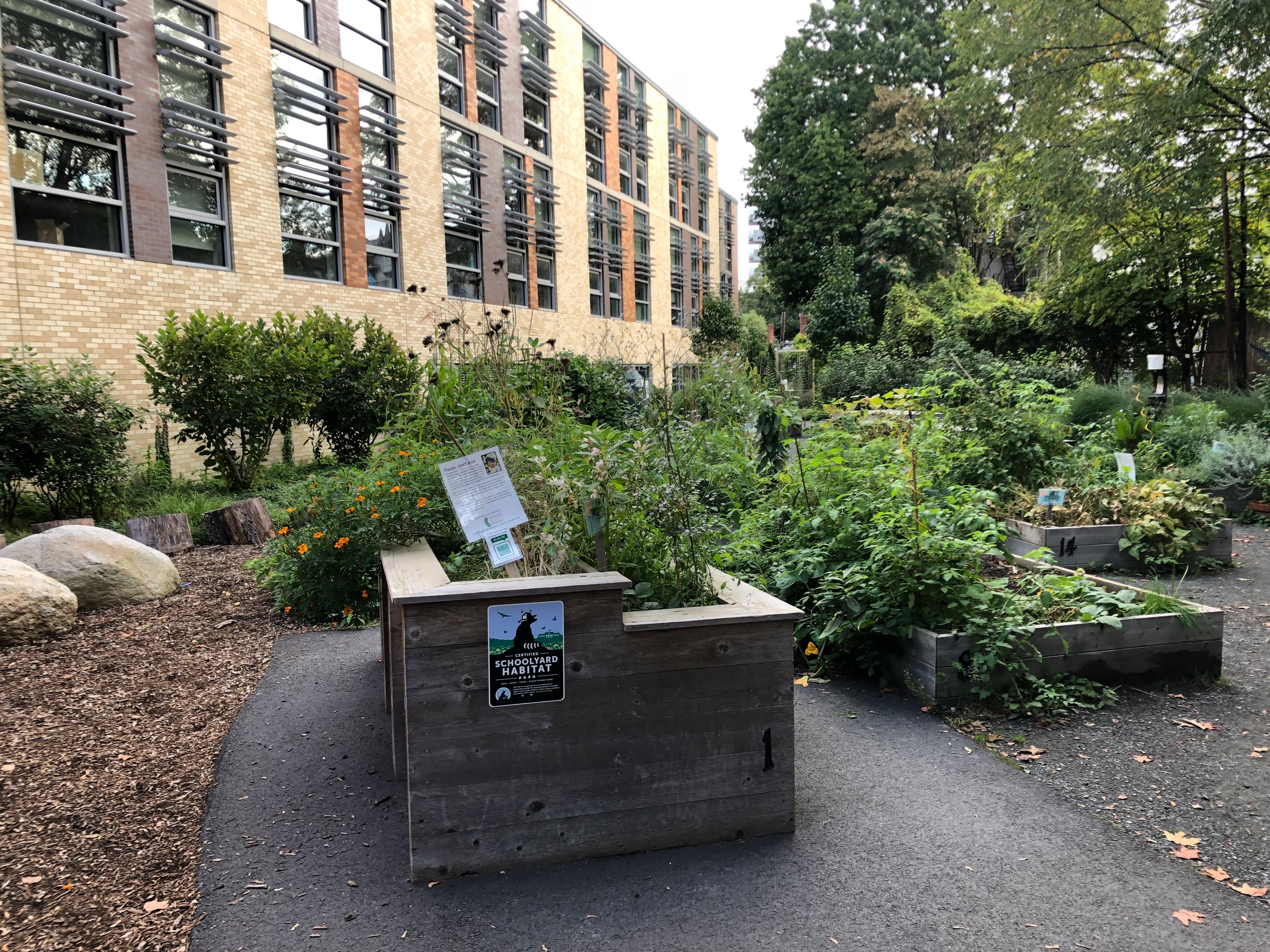
The Florida Riffin Ridley School garden (Brookline, Massachusetts)

==== Greening schoolyards ====
Schools increase the total green space by adding green oases in yards and replacing pavement with vegetation. In Paris, schools have adopted this intervention as a cooling program for schools. Chicago's Department of Water Management and the Metropolitan Water Reclamation District of Greater Chicago implemented a greening initiative called The Space to Grow. Though the purpose of this initiative was to control flooding and stormwater, schools successfully replaced asphalt with green space because of generous program funding by the city.

==== Green roofs ====
Installing green roofs on schools is an alternative way of increasing green space access for children, especially in urban areas. The United States is currently seeing efforts by political figures to increase awareness and funding in greening. For example, U.S. Rep. Nydia M, Velazquez (D-NY) introduced a bill that would allocate $500 million federal funds to plan, install and maintain green roofs at public schools in New York City. It would be overseen by the U.S. Department of Energy through a grant program. Green roofs can prove to be beneficial to urban environments. As an urban green space, green roofs can help combat the Urban heat island effect.

==== Gardens ====
Gardens are a unique greening initiative, whether the goal is to grow vegetables, fruit or flowers. For example, in Brookline, Massachusetts, United States, the Florida Riffin Ridley School has a vegetable garden that is maintained by teachers, students and parents. A garden intervention may positively influence children's food preference, increase intake of fruits and vegetables, and increase physical activity.

=== Greenery office ===
Plants can be added to offices and workspaces to aid in focus, reduce stress levels, increase creativity, improve air quality, and provide aesthetic appeal.

== See also ==
- Alley § Green and revitalized alleys
- Afforestation
- Biophilic design
- Greenwashing
- Community Greens
- Environmental justice
- Environmental planning
- Green retrofit
- Sustainable refurbishment
- Green Spaces
