= Greeneville Commons =

Shopping complex in Greeneville, Tennessee

- Location: 1316–1369 Tusculum Boulevard, Greeneville, Tennessee, 37745
- Coordinates: 36.1746°N 82.7966°W
- Opened: 1990
- Num. of stores: 24
- Num. of anchor tenants: 6 plus 2 junior anchor
- Floors: 1

Greeneville Commons is a shopping center located in Greeneville, Tennessee along US Route 11E and US Route 11E Business. Greeneville Commons is the largest shopping complex in Greeneville. It is anchored by Belk Outlet Store, Hobby Lobby, Ross, Bealls and Tractor Supply Co. with Hibbett Sports and Marshalls as junior anchors. JCPenney closed on July 31, 2017.

== History ==
The shopping center opened in 1990 and was originally anchored by Parks-Belk, JCPenney, Goody's Family Clothing and Kmart. Parks-Belk became Proffitt's in 1995, and later became Belk in 2006, Goody's closed in 2009 and became Burke's Outlet in 2010. JCPenney closed on July 31, 2017. Ross moved into the former JCPenney building. Kmart closed on April 24, 2018 following a liquidation. Marshalls, Hobby Lobby and Five Below moved into the former Kmart building in 2019.

Before Hobby Lobby and Marshalls opened, the property was a home to Kmart Store which opened on August 9, 1990 and closed in April 2018.

In January 2023 Belk converted their store into the first ever Belk Outlet, which sells clearance clothing and home decor from other non-outlet stores.

In March 2023, Tractor Supply Company moved their Greeneville location from Andrew Johnson Highway into the Greeneville Commons.
