= Five Rivers Electronic Innovations =

American television manufacturer

Five Rivers Electronic Innovations, LLC
- Type: Private
- Industry: Consumer electronics
- Founded: 1997; 29 years ago
- Founder: George Taylor; Charles White
- Defunct: 2006; 20 years ago
- Headquarters: 1915 Snapps Ferry Road, Greeneville, Tennessee, U.S.
- Area served: United States
- Key people: Thomas Hopson (President and CEO)
- Number of employees: 919 (2001)
- Parent: Taylor-White, LLC

Five Rivers Electronic Innovations, LLC was an American television manufacturer based in Greeneville, Tennessee. Founded in 1997 after acquiring a facility from Philips Consumer Electronics, it produced Philips and Magnavox-branded TVs, as well as producing digital TVs for other brands. As the last American-owned television manufacturer in the United States, the company was heavily impacted by competition from low-cost, imported color TVs.

== History ==
=== Background ===
Magnavox, an electronics manufacturer best known for its television sets, operated its main three facilities in Greeneville. Magnavox was at one time the largest employer of Greeneville, employing more than 5,000 workers. The first plant (Plant #1) was opened in 1947, and the second plant (Plant #2) was opened in 1952.

In 1962 Magnavox built its third facility (Plant #3) in Greeneville, which was the largest TV manufacturing plant in the United States. In 1974, the facilities and the Magnavox company were acquired by the Dutch electronics giant Philips. Throughout the 1980s and early 1990s, the Greeneville facility saw a fluctuation and drops in employment.

=== Operational years (1997–2005) ===
In May 1997 Philips sold its television manufacturing plant (including Plant #3) in Greeneville, Tennessee to Knoxville businessmen George Taylor and Charles White, who established it as Five Rivers Electronic Innovations.

On March 1, 1999, Five Rivers Electronic Innovations began manufacturing the 36-inch Loewe Art digital TV, in partnership with Sensory Science Corporation. At the beginning of 2001, the plant employed approximately 700 employees making televisions and 1,300 other employees making components whose jobs depend on television production. In February 2001, the company laid off approximately 140 workers (40 salaried and 100 hourly) due to a slowing economy.

On December 19, 2002, the company laid off 335 employees due to a slowdown in orders and a larger-than-normal seasonal adjustment. Despite the layoffs, the company expected to rehire 80–100 workers by late January 2003. Also by the end of the year, the plant began producing plastic parts for Sony.

In 2003 the company began mass-producing flat-screen CRT TVs. By early 2004 employment had dropped even further to a record low of 535 workers. In May 2004, the company recalled 150 workers and added production lines, driven by new business secured from Asian companies affected by tariffs.

On October 15, 2004, the plant laid off 110 employees due to losing the Philips contract but concurrently recalled 280 workers for Samsung production, bringing staff to approximately 812. On October 25, 2004, the company filed for Chapter 11 bankruptcy after Philips stopped selling its LCoS TVs.

In July 2005 Five Rivers Technology produced a Akai rear-projection TV what was considered the last television manufactured in America by an American-owned company. It was now on display in the Greeneville-Greene County History Museum.

=== Final years (2005–2006) ===
In September 2006 the company shuttered its operations, and was auctioning off estimated $3.5 million in unused equipment, including 6,500 lots of machinery.

== Competition from Chinese manufacturers ==
In around 2003–2004 the company (and other US TV manufacturers) was being hurt by the imports of TV sets from China and Malaysia. Later, Five Rivers filed an anti-dumping lawsuit against Chinese TV manufacturers. On November 16, 2004, Five Rivers was used as an example in the PBS Frontline documentary "Is Walmart Good for America?".
