= Maxim Healthcare Services =

Medical staffing company based in Maryland, US

- Company type: Private
- Industry: Employment Agency
- Predecessors: Maxim Healthcare Group; MEDCALL Medical Staffing
- Founded: 1988
- Headquarters: Columbia, Maryland, USA
- Services: Home healthcare
- Website: www.maximhealthcare.com

Maxim Healthcare Services is a privately held home health provider headquartered in Columbia, Maryland. It is one of two companies formed in 2022 when Maxim Healthcare Group was split. The other company is now known as Amergis and is a medical staffing company. Maxim was founded in 1988 as MEDCALL Medical Staffing.

== History ==
Maxim Healthcare was founded in 1988.

In 2008, Maxim Healthcare received ACHC Accreditation.

In June 2020, Maxim Healthcare Services changed their name to Maxim Healthcare Group.

In February 2022, the company announced it was retiring the Healthcare Group brand, separating into two independent business units - Maxim Healthcare Services and Maxim Healthcare Staffing.

Maxim Healthcare Staffing rebranded as Amergis in April 2024.

== Litigation ==
Starting in 2009, Maxim and some of its employees came under government scrutiny for alleged fraudulent billings and false statements to health officials, which were “a common practice at Maxim from 2003 through 2009,” according to the U.S. Attorney's office in New Jersey. Between 2009 and 2011, nine current and former Maxim employees including three senior managers pleaded guilty to felony charges. In 2011, Maxim entered into agreements with the United States Department of Justice and affected states to pay $150 million to resolve criminal and civil charges that the company submitted claims for millions of dollars of work that it did not perform and operated offices that were not properly licensed. The Company entered into a Deferred Prosecution Agreement with the United States Attorney's Office for the District of New Jersey, a corporate integrity agreement with the Office of the Inspector General, U.S. Department of Health and Human Services, and civil settlement agreements with the United States of America and 43 states.
