= Community greens =

Shared urban green spaces

Community Greens, sometimes referred to as backyard commons, urban commons, or pocket neighborhoods, are shared open green spaces on the inside of city blocks, created either when residents merge backyard space or reclaim underutilized urban land such as vacant lots and alleyways. These shared spaces are communally used and managed only by the residents whose homes abut them. They are not a public park, a private backyard, or a community garden. However, they can function as all three.

== Community Greens ==
Community Greens is a movement concerned with the development of shared green spaces in residential neighborhoods in American cities. These green spaces are community greens. The Community Greens movement believes that such an approach presents the best opportunity to add usable green space to American cities, by converting under utilized backyards and dysfunctional alleys into functional and beautiful shared green spaces that are owned, managed, and enjoyed by the people who live around them.

This has led communities in numerous American cities, including Boston, Sacramento, Baltimore, New York, and San Francisco, taking down their backyard fences, to create backyard commons.

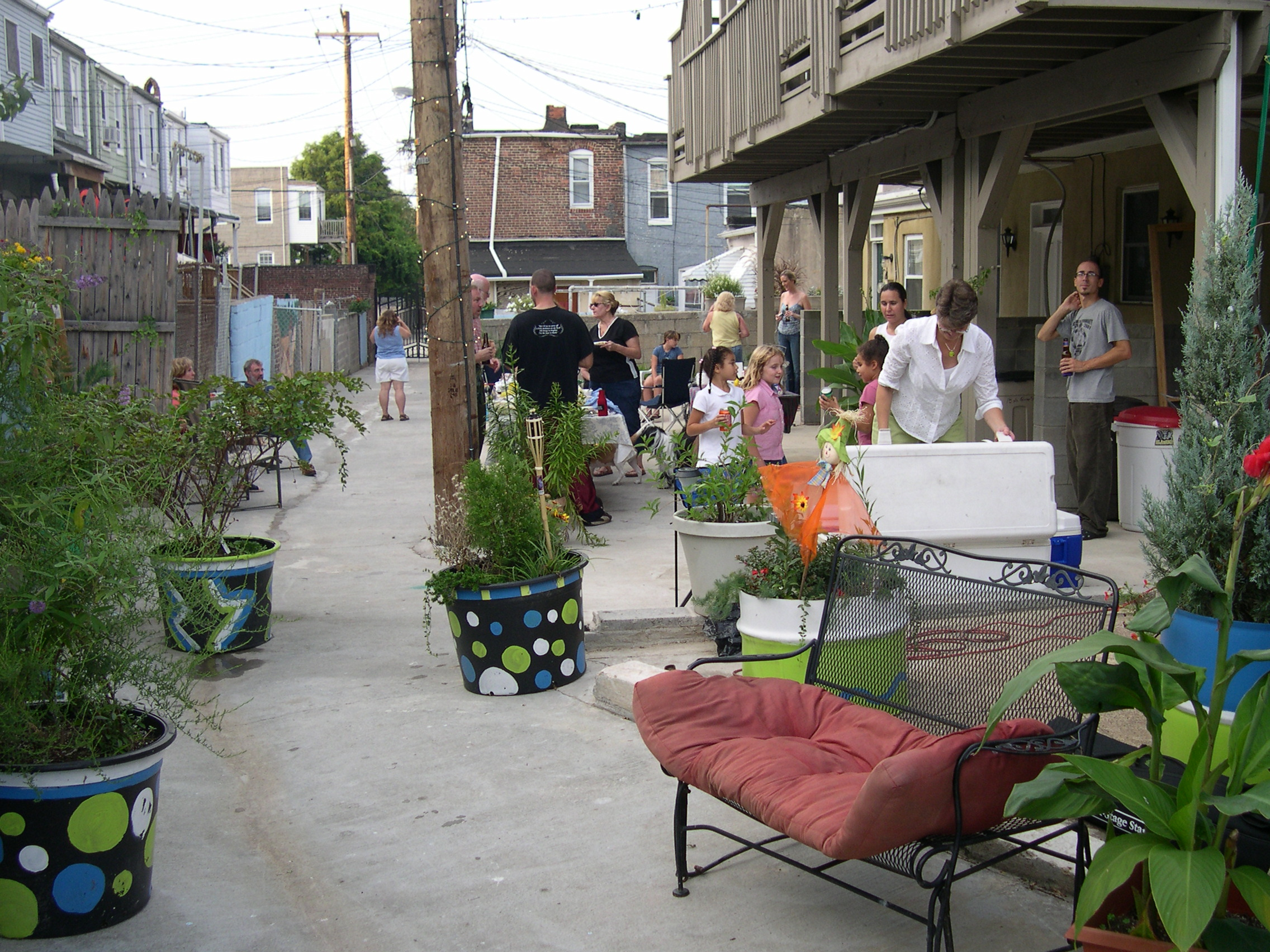
Community Green behind the Luzerne-Glover Block

Community Greens are multi-functional spaces for gardening, recreation, and leisure which are designed to provide social, economic, and environmental benefits to urban residents. The creation of backyard commons can lead to an increased interaction with neighbors throughout the planning and implementation process, which may result in a stronger overall sense of community. Other possible social benefits that are claimed include decreased crime, from having more eyes on the street, and safe places where children can play and adults relax. Community Greens, like other types of urban green spaces, can significantly improve the ecological functioning of urban habitats. Vegetation and permeable pavement can slow storm water runoff and increase groundwater, which in turn can reduce pollutant flowing into nearby bodies of water during a storm. Urban environments are often significantly warmer than outlying suburbs, mostly due to the prevalence of heat retentive concrete surfaces. City trees can mitigate this effect through shading, etc. The taking down of backyards fences transforms fragmented habitats to connected corridors for urban wildlife. Furthermore, because city dwellers recognize value in green space, often simply from an aesthetic standpoint, and this may be reflected through increased property values.

== The beginnings in Maryland ==
- Community Greens was founded as an offshoot of Ashoka, by Ashoka founder Bill Drayton in 2001.
- Spearheaded a statewide legislature in Maryland, which changed the City Charter which allows the city to lease and gate alleys to homeowners.
- Started the Alley Gating and Alley Greening pilot project in Baltimore in 2006.
- Local ordinance passed in the City of Baltimore in 2007.
- As of 2009, there are 3 completely gated and greened alleys in Baltimore and over 70 applications from interested neighborhoods.

=== Baltimore: The pilot project ===
In 2002, a group of residents from the Patterson Park neighborhood approached the Patterson Park Community Development Corporation (CDC) looking for a way to improve the dirty, crime-ridden alley that ran behind their homes. Simultaneously, Community Greens also approached the Patterson Park CDC looking for an alley they could use as a pilot project in Baltimore, and these two groups were put into contact. The Luzerne-Glover block was granted a temporary permit from the city to gate their alleyway, despite the fact that it was not yet legal to gate a right-of-way. Community Greens, the Patterson Park CDC, the Patterson Park Neighborhood Association and the Luzerne‐Glover block group turned to University of Maryland law professor Barbara Bezdek, who enlisted the help of her law students, who researched existing laws and current uses of Baltimore alleyways.

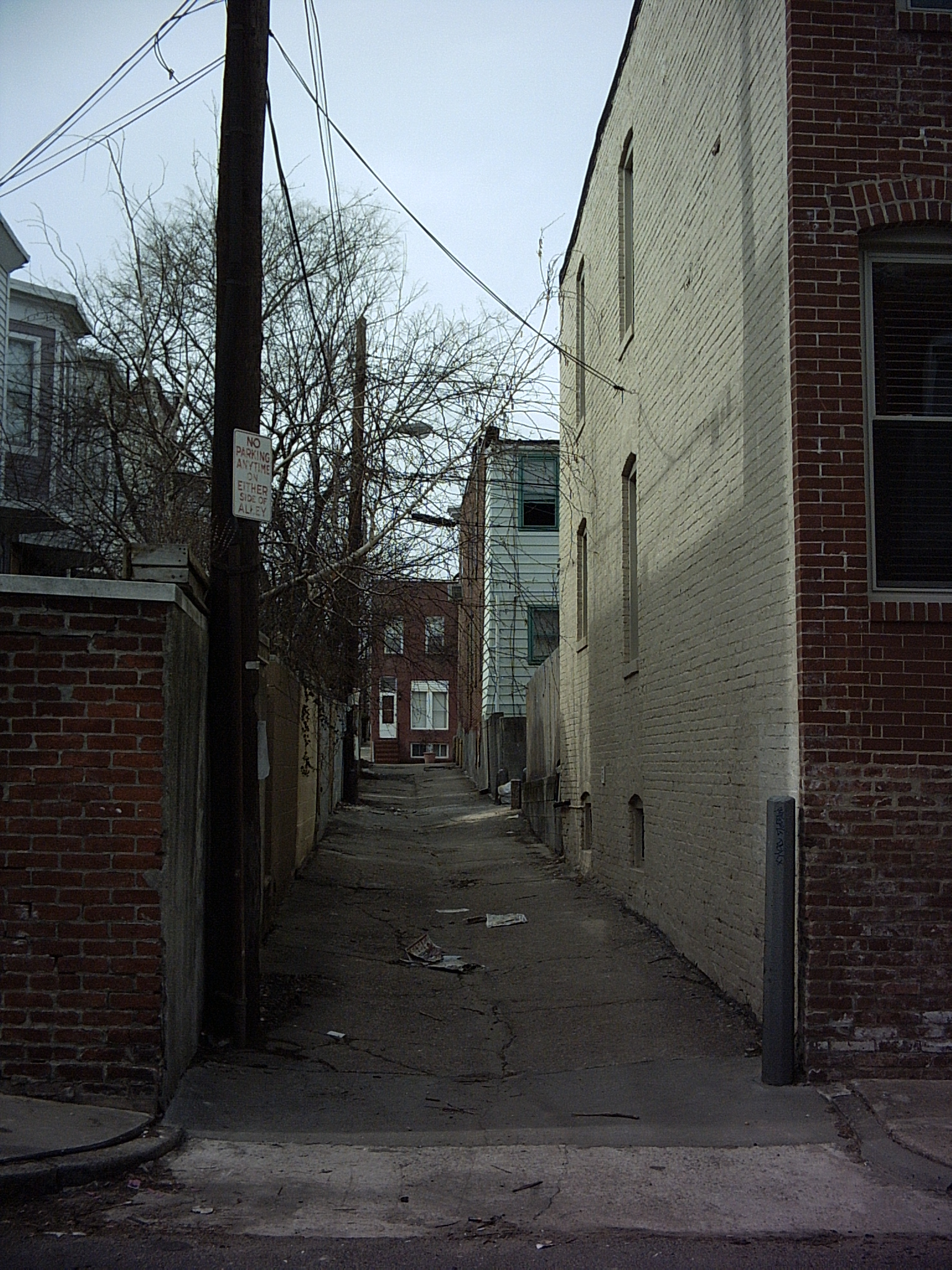
The Luzerne-Glover Block alley before gating and greening

Looking for a permanent solution, these groups aligned themselves with the Mayor's Department of Neighborhoods and took their case to Annapolis. Maryland Delegate Peter A. Hammen sponsored House Bill 1533 to amend the Baltimore City Charter, allowing the city to close alleyways and lease them to interested parties. The Luzerne-Glover group testified before the Environmental Committee of the state legislature and House Bill 1533 passed in 2004. Community Greens then worked with law firm Hogan & Hartson, in collaboration with Barbara Bezdek, to draft a city alley gating and leasing ordinance, which was then submitted to the City of Baltimore.

In April 2007, the Baltimore City Council under the leadership of newly elected Mayor Shelia Dixon, passed the Gating and Greening Alleys ordinance, enabling Baltimore residents to legally gate and green the alleys behind their homes, contingent on a requirement that 80% of the homeowners on the alley submit consent forms and 100% of property owners approve projects that impede traffic flow. Projects requiring 100% consent include removal of existing concrete and installation of permeable pavement and large tree plantings; beautification and smaller greening projects that do not impede traffic only require 80% approval.

Interested communities need approval from several Baltimore City Departments, including Solid Waste, Transportation, Fire, and Police to ensure that proposed alley projects meet the necessary infrastructural conditions. Once initial approval is received, residents submit an application to the Department of Public Works, which includes the necessary consent forms from homeowners and a signed affidavit stating that attempts were made to obtain approval from all homeowners.

The Luzerne Glover neighborhood now has their green alleyway, and is the first community in Baltimore to use the Gating and Greening Alleys ordinance. So far, seven Baltimore communities have successfully completed this process and have created eight useful Community Greens from the underutilized alleyways in their backyards.

== Other existing greens ==
=== Montgomery Park - Boston, Massachusetts ===
Montgomery Park is a third of an acre common space shared by 85 households in Boston's South End neighborhood. From the time the neighborhood was first developed in the 1860s through the 1970s, the park was separated from the residents' backyards by an alley and fence. In more recent years, residents began to connect the park to their individual yards by replacing the alley separating their private backyards from the park with a narrower brick walkway and tearing down backyard fences. Additionally, residents have moved garbage collection to the front street and convinced utility companies to bury service lines. Residents now enjoy greater access to the shared Community Green, and use it for gardening and recreation.

=== Stoney Creek Apartments - Livermore, California ===
Stoney Creek Apartments were constructed in 1992 to address a lack of affordable housing in Livermore, California. Ten residential buildings share five courtyards, accessible from a small alleyway. Homes have front and back patios in addition to the shared courtyards, and neighbors have the opportunity to enjoy this shared outdoor space and experience a heightened sense of community. The inward-facing position of these patios allows parents to keep a watchful eye on children playing in the courtyard.

=== Chandlers Yard - Baltimore, Maryland ===
Located in the Federal Hill neighborhood of downtown Baltimore and hidden behind eleven narrow rowhouses, Chandler's Yard is a tree-shaded courtyard that was carved out of the backyards of the surrounding homes by developer Bill Struever who wanted to make living on the block more attractive to potential buyers. Struever convinced some of the property owners in this block to give up part of their backyards for this shared courtyard and pay a small construction fee. The result is a shared space for these residents and increased property values.

=== Village Homes - Davis, California ===
The Village Homes development is situated on a sixty-acre parcel in suburban Davis, California. While home lots are smaller than the average for Davis, clusters of eight homes share common green spaces accessible from private backyards. In addition to these courtyards, Village Homes residents share two large parks, two vineyards, and numerous small orchards and community gardens. Gardens are irrigated by naturally-flowing creeks, which also serve as natural filters that eliminate the need for an expensive storm-water sewer system. Residents enjoy environmental and aesthetic benefits from their shared spaces, and the increased sense of community is evident; Village Homes residents on average know 40 neighbors, compared to an average of 17 acquaintances reported in a nearby traditional suburban development.

=== Jackson Heights - Queens, New York ===
For nearly nine decades, the historic neighborhood of Jackson Heights in Queens has maintained its fourteen block-long shared interior courtyards, and is considered to be the first "garden apartments" constructed in the United States. These spaces have helped to sustain the blocks' distinctive appeal since their development in the early decades of the last century. Over the years, Jackson Heights residents fought to hold on to their gardens and green spaces in the midst of a city where high property values create an intense pressure to develop any available open space. The preservation of these shared spaces has increased both community pride and residential property values; if these inner courtyards had been developed, Jackson Heights property values would have dropped by one-third. In 1993, Jackson Heights was officially declared a historic district by the NYC Landmark Preservation Commission, furthering sense of place for this community.

=== St. Francis Square - San Francisco, California ===
A cooperative apartment community, St. Francis Square consists of 299 apartments wrapped around three shared, open spaces. These community greens are full of gardens, basketball courts, playgrounds, and quiet places to relax. St. Francis Square was established as a limited equity co-operative apartment, although it converted to market rate ownership in 2004.

=== The Hope Community - Minneapolis, MN ===
Fifteen years ago, this community was situated in an area of Minneapolis plagued by urban flight and crime. Instrumental to the rehabilitation and renovation of this neighborhood is a local community development corporation, Hope Community, Inc. In the late 1980s, residents were selling their properties for one dollar because they had lost all value; this is when the Hope Community began purchasing houses in the hopes of developing affordable rental units clustered together on a single block. Today, nine rehabilitated houses abut community areas, a playground, and gardens. Property values are steadily increasing and the community itself is stabilizing. By following principles of Crime Prevention Through Environmental Design (CPTED) and creating defensible space, the Hope Community has created a sense of shared ownership and community in a troubled urban area.

== Green alleys ==
Something similar has taken place in various cities in North America, involving the greening of back lanes or alleys. This includes Chicago, Seattle, Los Angeles, Washington, D.C., and Montréal, Canada, who have started to reclaim their alleys from garbage and crime by greening the service lanes, or back ways, that run behind some houses.

Chicago, Illinois has about 1,900 miles (3,100 km) of alleyways. In 2007, the Chicago Department of Transportation started converting conventional alleys which were paved with asphalt into so called Green Alleys. This program, called the Green Alley Program, is supposed to enable easier water runoff, as the alleyways in Chicago are not connected to the sewer system. With this program, the water will be able to seep through semi-permeable concrete or asphalt in which a colony of fungi and bacteria will establish itself. The bacteria will help breakup oils before the water is absorbed into the ground. The lighter color of the pavement will also reflect more light, making the area next to the alley cooler. The greening of such alleys or laneways can also involve the planting of native plants to further absorb rain water and moderate temperature.

In Montreal, Quebec, the first ruelle verte was completed in 1997 in the Plateau Mont-Royal borough. Since then, the project has expanded to at least 455 green alleyways across 15 boroughs of the city. The number of green alleyways expanded rapidly over the course of the COVID-19 pandemic, where they were praised by advocates for their role in reinforcing a sense of community and reducing the urban heat island effect.

== See also ==
- Community gardening
- Greening
- Village green
