= Tennessee State Route 353 =

Highway in Tennessee

State Route 353
- Bailey Bridge Road; Old State Route 34
- TN 353 highlighted in red

Route information
- Maintained by TDOT
- Length: 13.3 mi (21.4 km)
- Existed: July 1, 1983–present

Major junctions
- South end: SR 107 in South Central
- North end: SR 81 in Jonesborough

Location
- Country: United States
- State: Tennessee
- Counties: Washington

Highway system
- Tennessee State Routes; Interstate; US; State
← SR 352	→ SR 354

State Route 353 (SR 353) is a state highway in the northeastern portion of the U.S. state of Tennessee, in the area known as the Tri-Cities region. It connects the community of South Central with the town of Jonesborough.

== Route description ==
SR 353 begins at an intersection with SR 107 in South Central as Bailey Bridge Road. Approximately 0.4 miles (0.64 km) from SR 107, the route crosses the Nolichucky River. It continues to the community of Washington College, where Bailey Bridge Road ends and SR 353 becomes Old State Route 34. It continues northeast through rural areas to pass through Telford. It meets its northern terminus in Jonesborough, an intersection with SR 81 southwest of downtown.

== Major intersections ==
The entire route is in Washington County.

Location	mi	km	Destinations	Notes
South Central	0.0	0.0	SR 107 (Erwin Highway) – Tusculum, Lamar, Erwin	Southern terminus
South Central	0.5	0.80	Bridge over the Nolichucky River	
Jonesborough	13.3	21.4	SR 81 (W Main Street) – Fall Branch, Downtown, Lamar, Erwin	Northern terminus
1.000 mi = 1.609 km; 1.000 km = 0.621 mi

== History ==
The original designation for SR 353 was State Route 81A (SR 81A), an alternate route of SR 81 which existed between 1938 and 1951. In addition, this was the first of two state highways in Tennessee to bear this designation. After its decommission, the route was returned to local control. On July 1, 1983, the state reassumed control of the route and numbered it SR 353 as part of a statewide takeover of local routes that also included a renumbering of most alternate routes.

== See also ==
- List of state routes in Tennessee
