= Washington County, Tennessee =

County in Tennessee, United States

- County
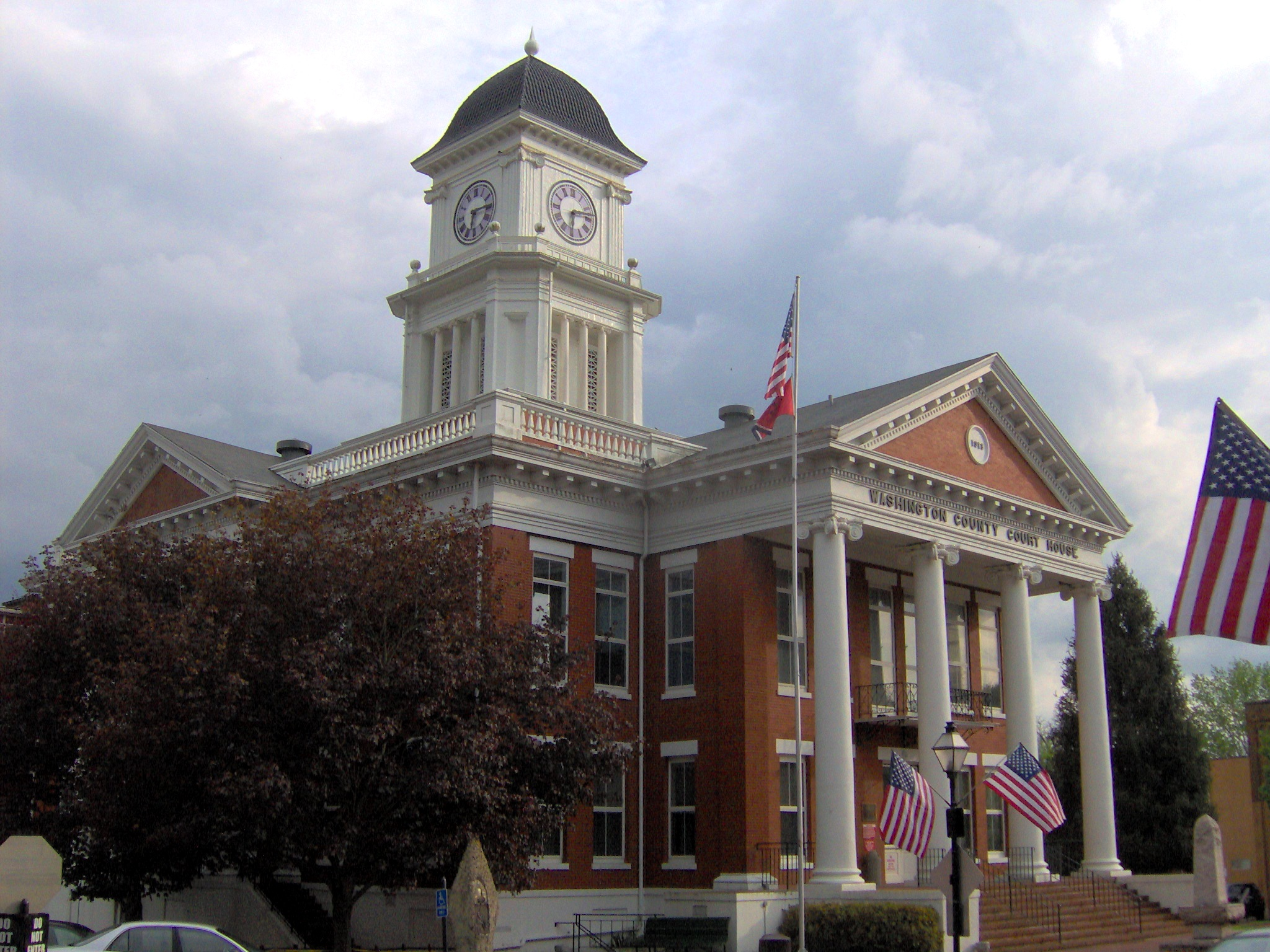
- Washington County Courthouse in Jonesborough

- Flag Seal

- Location within the U.S. state of Tennessee
- Coordinates: 36°17′N 82°30′W
- Country: United States
- State: Tennessee
- Founded: 1777
- Named for: George Washington
- Seat: Jonesborough
- Largest city: Johnson City

Area
  - Total: 330 sq mi (850 km^{2})
  - Land: 326 sq mi (840 km^{2})
  - Water: 3.3 sq mi (8.5 km^{2}) 1.0%

Population (2020)
  - Total: 133,001
  - Estimate (2025): 141,199 ▲
  - Density: 408/sq mi (158/km^{2})
- Time zone: UTC−5 (Eastern)
  - Summer (DST): UTC−4 (EDT)
- Congressional district: 1st
- Website: www.washingtoncountytn.org

Washington County is a county located in the U.S. state of Tennessee. As of the 2020 census, the population was 133,001. Its county seat is Jonesborough. The county's largest city and a regional educational, medical and commercial center is Johnson City. Washington County is Tennessee's oldest county, having been established in 1777 when the state was still part of North Carolina. Washington County is part of the Johnson City, TN Metropolitan Statistical Area, which is a component of the Johnson City–Kingsport–Bristol, TN-VA Combined Statistical Area, commonly known as the "Tri-Cities" region.

== History ==
=== Watauga and the Washington District ===
Washington County is rooted in the Watauga settlements, which were established in the early 1770s in the vicinity of what is now Elizabethton, in adjacent Carter County. At the outbreak of the Revolutionary War in 1776, the Wataugans organized the "Washington District", which was governed by a committee of safety. North Carolina initially refused to recognize the settlements as legal, but finally agreed to annex the district after the settlers thwarted an invasion by hostile Cherokees. The settlements were governed as the Washington District, which originally included all of what is now Tennessee. The district was reorganized as Washington County in 1777.

=== Washington County, North Carolina and Franklin ===
From 1777 until 1784, North Carolina held nominal control over the county, but did little for the residents, at least in their eyes. So the area citizens formed, in 1784, the State of Franklin to meet their needs. Franklin was an early attempt to create a fourteenth state prior to Kentucky and Vermont's admissions into the union. The county reverted to North Carolina control, however, following the failure of the Franklin state government in 1788.

=== Part of Tennessee ===
In 1790 the area became part of Southwest Territory, and afterward it was admitted to the Union in 1796 as the 16th state. Jonesboro, the county seat of Washington County, is Tennessee's oldest town. With many buildings restored, it comprises one of the nation's most authentic historic districts of the period 1790–1870.

Washington County was divided between pro-Union and pro-secession sentiments at the outset of the Civil War. In Tennessee's Ordinance of Secession referendum on June 8, 1861, Washington Countians voted 1,445 to 1,022 in favor of remaining in the Union. One of the bridges targeted by the East Tennessee bridge-burners in November 1861 was located in what is now Watauga near the Washington-Carter county line. Landon Carter Haynes, a Confederate senator, hailed from Washington County.

Johnson City, originally known as Johnson's Depot, was a major railway center for the southeastern states, connecting the region for freight transportation and passengers. It was the headquarters for both the standard-gauge Carolina, Clinchfield, and Ohio (Clinchfield Railroad), which required the excavation and blasting of 17 tunnels during its construction; and the narrow-gauge East Tennessee and Western North Carolina Railroad (Tweetsie). Significant restoration is underway, as well as publicizing the railroad heritage of the Johnson's Depot Historic District. Other historic properties are being restored as representative of Johnson City's late nineteenth and early twentieth-century era as a railway center.

== Geography ==
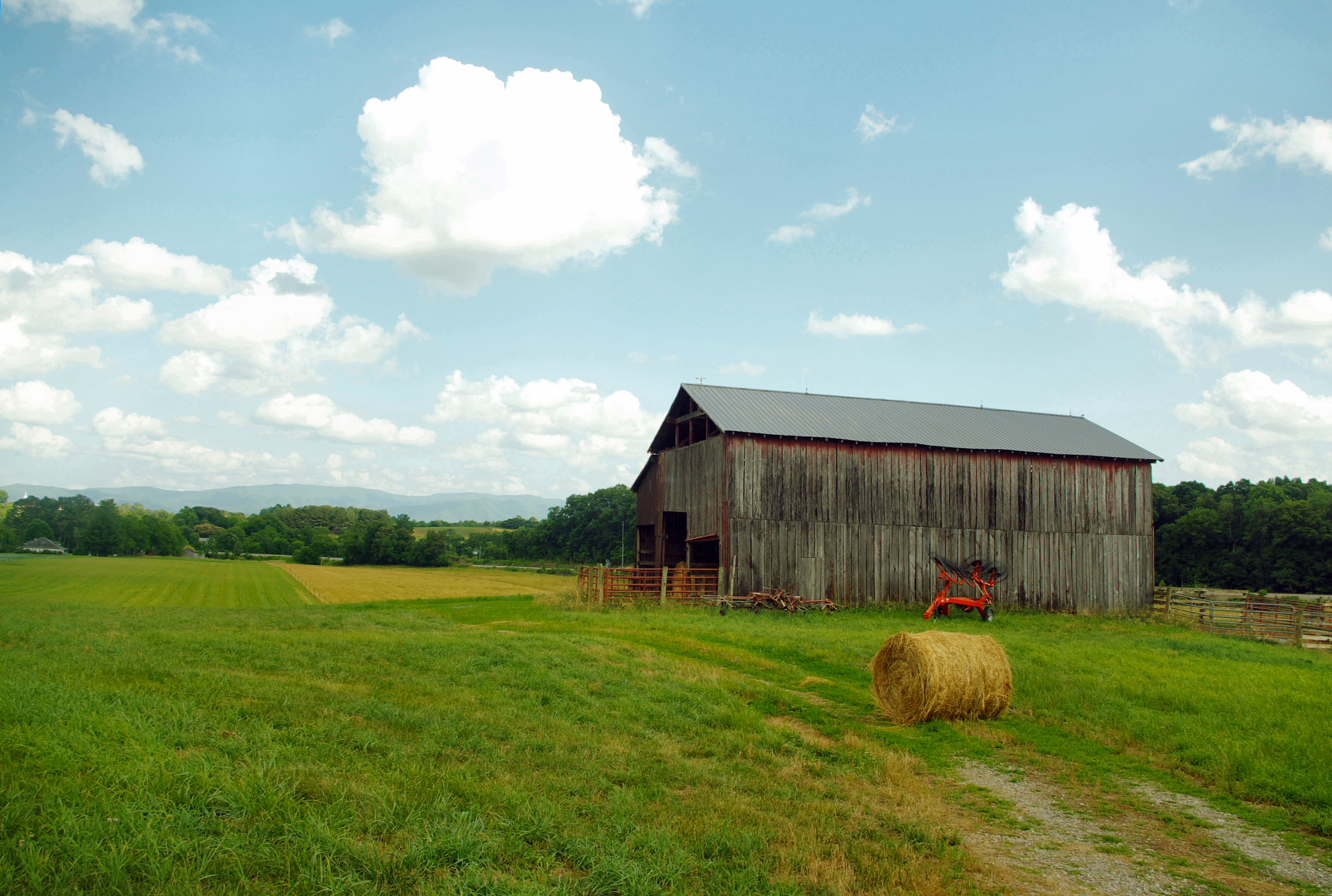
Farm near Limestone

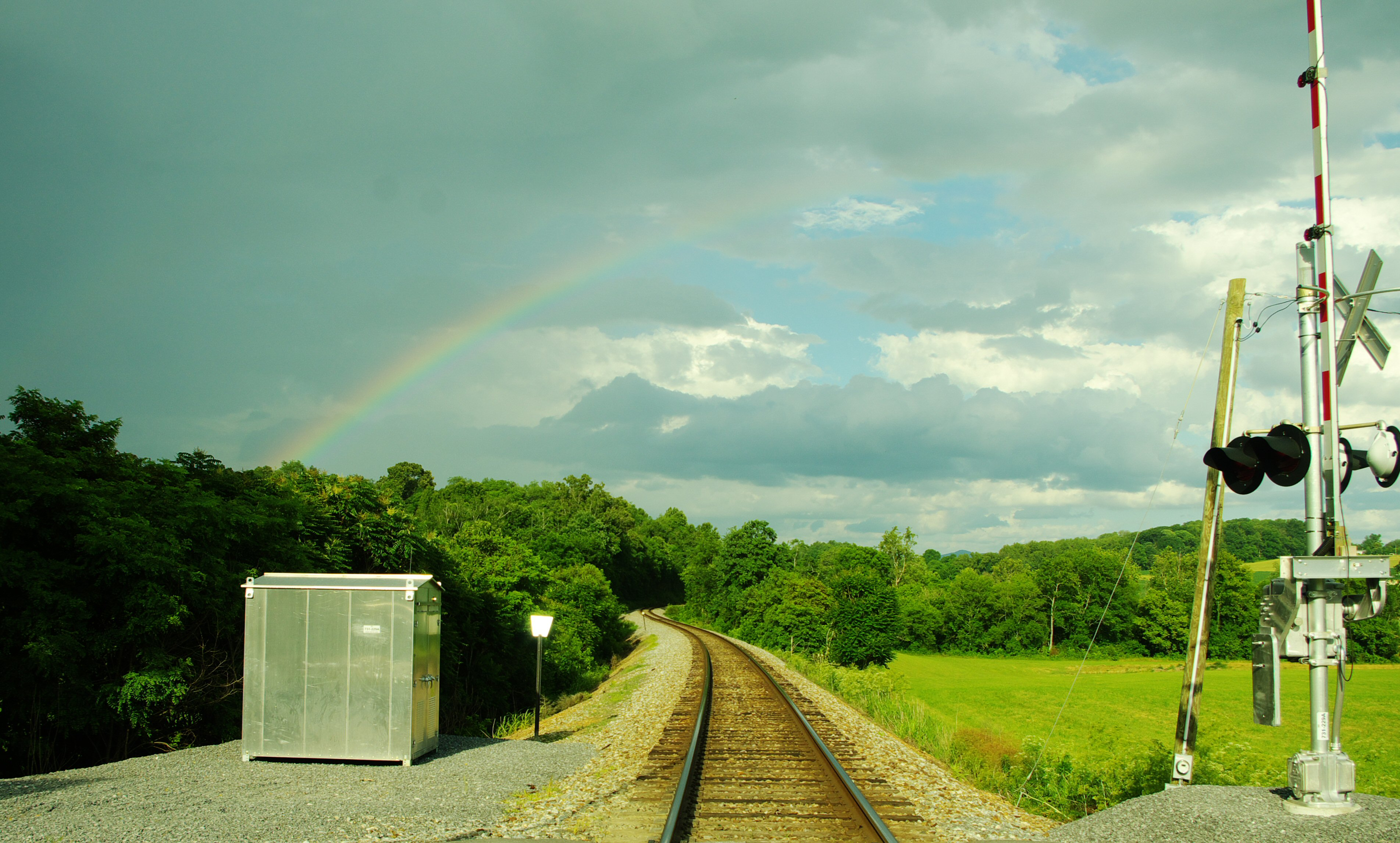
Rainbow and railroad tracks near Telford

According to the U.S. Census Bureau, the county has a total area of 330 square miles (850 km^{2}), of which 326 square miles (840 km^{2}) is land and 3.3 square miles (8.5 km^{2}) (1.0%) is water. The western portion of the county is situated in the Ridge-and-Valley Appalachians, which are characterized by long, narrow ridges roughly oriented northeast-to-southwest. The county's most prominent Ridge-and-Valley features rise in the vicinity of its northwestern border with Hawkins and Sullivan counties. The eastern portion of the county lies within the Blue Ridge Mountains, specifically the Bald Mountains (south of the Nolichucky River) and the Unaka Range (north of the Nolichucky). Buffalo Mountain, a long ridge that straddles much of Washington's eastern boundary, contains the county's highest point, 3,520-foot (1,070 m) Pinnacle Knob. The Cherokee National Forest protects much of the extreme eastern part of the county. Sampson Mountain, which rises in the southeastern part of the county, is home to a designated wilderness area.

The Nolichucky River flows through the southern part of Washington County. The Watauga River flows the northern part of the county, and forms part of the county's border with Sullivan County. The lower section of the Watauga River is part of Boone Lake.

=== Adjacent counties ===
- Sullivan County (north)
- Carter County (east)
- Unicoi County (south)
- Greene County (west)
- Hawkins County (northwest)

=== National protected area ===
- Cherokee National Forest (part)

=== State protected areas ===
- Chester Inn (state historic site)
- Tipton-Haynes State Historic Site

=== Major highways ===
- I-26
- I-81
- US 11E
- US 19W
- US 23
- US 321
- SR 36
- SR 67
- SR 75
- SR 81
- SR 91
- SR 93
- SR 107
- SR 353
- SR 354
- SR 381
- SR 400

== Demographics ==
Historical population
Census	Pop.	Note	%±
1790	5,872		—
1800	6,379		8.6%
1810	7,740		21.3%
1820	9,557		23.5%
1830	10,995		15.0%
1840	11,751		6.9%
1850	13,861		18.0%
1860	14,829		7.0%
1870	16,317		10.0%
1880	16,181		−0.8%
1890	20,354		25.8%
1900	22,604		11.1%
1910	28,968		28.2%
1920	34,052		17.6%
1930	45,805		34.5%
1940	51,631		12.7%
1950	59,971		16.2%
1960	64,832		8.1%
1970	73,924		14.0%
1980	88,755		20.1%
1990	92,315		4.0%
2000	107,198		16.1%
2010	122,979		14.7%
2020	133,001		8.1%
2025 (est.)	141,199	▲	6.2%
U.S. Decennial Census; 1790-1960 1900-1990; 1990-2000 2010-2019, 2017

=== Racial and ethnic composition ===
Washington County, Tennessee – Racial and ethnic composition Note: the US Census treats Hispanic/Latino as an ethnic category. This table excludes Latinos from the racial categories and assigns them to a separate category. Hispanics/Latinos may be of any race.
Race / Ethnicity (NH = Non-Hispanic)	Pop 1980	Pop 1990	Pop 2000	Pop 2010	Pop 2020	% 1980	% 1990	% 2000	% 2010	% 2020
White alone (NH)	84,862	88,047	99,578	110,902	112,606	95.61%	95.38%	92.89%	90.18%	84.67%
Black or African American alone (NH)	2,991	3,268	4,058	4,727	5,511	3.37%	3.54%	3.79%	3.84%	4.14%
Native American or Alaska Native alone (NH)	89	146	238	323	289	0.10%	0.16%	0.22%	0.26%	0.22%
Asian alone (NH)	239	369	774	1,461	1,980	0.27%	0.40%	0.72%	1.19%	1.49%
Native Hawaiian or Pacific Islander alone (NH)	x	x	20	25	53	x	x	0.02%	0.02%	0.04%
Other race alone (NH)	110	14	88	116	606	0.12%	0.02%	0.08%	0.09%	0.46%
Mixed race or Multiracial (NH)	x	x	960	1,792	5,820	x	x	0.90%	1.46%	4.38%
Hispanic or Latino (any race)	464	471	1,482	3,633	6,136	0.52%	0.51%	1.38%	2.95%	4.61%
Total	88,755	92,315	107,198	122,979	133,001	100.00%	100.00%	100.00%	100.00%	100.00%

=== 2020 census ===
As of the 2020 census, the county had a population of 133,001, 55,428 households, and 33,838 families residing in the county.

As of the 2020 census, the median age was 40.7 years. 19.0% of residents were under the age of 18 and 19.2% of residents were 65 years of age or older. For every 100 females there were 94.9 males, and for every 100 females age 18 and over there were 92.7 males age 18 and over.

The racial makeup of the county was 85.7% White, 4.2% Black or African American, 0.3% American Indian and Alaska Native, 1.5% Asian, <0.1% Native Hawaiian and Pacific Islander, 2.1% from some other race, and 6.1% from two or more races. Hispanic or Latino residents of any race comprised 4.6% of the population.

74.2% of residents lived in urban areas, while 25.8% lived in rural areas.

There were 55,428 households in the county, of which 25.5% had children under the age of 18 living in them. Of all households, 45.1% were married-couple households, 19.9% were households with a male householder and no spouse or partner present, and 28.1% were households with a female householder and no spouse or partner present. About 31.0% of all households were made up of individuals and 12.4% had someone living alone who was 65 years of age or older.

There were 60,546 housing units, of which 8.5% were vacant. Among occupied housing units, 64.5% were owner-occupied and 35.5% were renter-occupied. The homeowner vacancy rate was 1.6% and the rental vacancy rate was 7.7%.

=== 2000 census ===
As of the census of 2000, there were 107,198 people, 44,195 households, and 29,478 families residing in the county. The population density was 328 people per square mile (127 people/km^{2}). There were 47,779 housing units at an average density of 146 units per square mile (56/km^{2}). The racial makeup of the county was 93.72% White, 3.82% Black or African American, 0.24% Native American, 0.73% Asian, 0.02% Pacific Islander, 0.51% from other races, and 0.97% from two or more races. 1.38% of the population were Hispanic or Latino of any race.

There were 44,195 households, out of which 28.20% had children under the age of 18 living with them, 52.60% were married couples living together, 10.50% had a female householder with no husband present, and 33.30% were non-families. 27.80% of all households were made up of individuals, and 9.70% had someone living alone who was 65 years of age or older. The average household size was 2.33 and the average family size was 2.85.

In the county, the population was spread out, with 21.30% under the age of 18, 10.80% from 18 to 24, 30.00% from 25 to 44, 24.00% from 45 to 64, and 13.90% who were 65 years of age or older. The median age was 37 years. For every 100 females, there were 94.80 males. For every 100 females age 18 and over, there were 91.70 males.

The median income for a household in the county was $33,116, and the median income for a family was $41,162. Males had a median income of $30,874 versus $21,485 for females. The per capita income for the county was $19,085. About 10.20% of families and 13.90% of the population were below the poverty line, including 16.80% of those under age 18 and 14.20% of those age 65 or over.

== Education ==
There are two school districts in the county: Washington County School District and Johnson City School District. The majority of Johnson City is in the latter, while all other areas of the county are in the former.

Washington County schools include:

Elementary schools

- Boones Creek Elementary
- Fall Branch Elementary
- Grandview Elementary
- Gray Elementary
- Jonesborough Elementary
- Lamar (Elementary) School
- Ridgeview Elementary
- South Central Elementary
- Sulphur Springs Elementary
- West View Elementary

Middle schools

- Boones Creek Middle School
- Jonesborough Middle School. Built in 1950 as a high school. Became a middle school in 1971. Has approximately 500 students in grades 5–8.

High schools

- Asbury Optional High School
- Daniel Boone High School
- David Crockett High School
- University School (K-12)

Colleges and universities

- East Tennessee State University, a public research university located in Johnson City
- Northeast State Community College at Gray, a public two-year college extension campus

== Communities ==
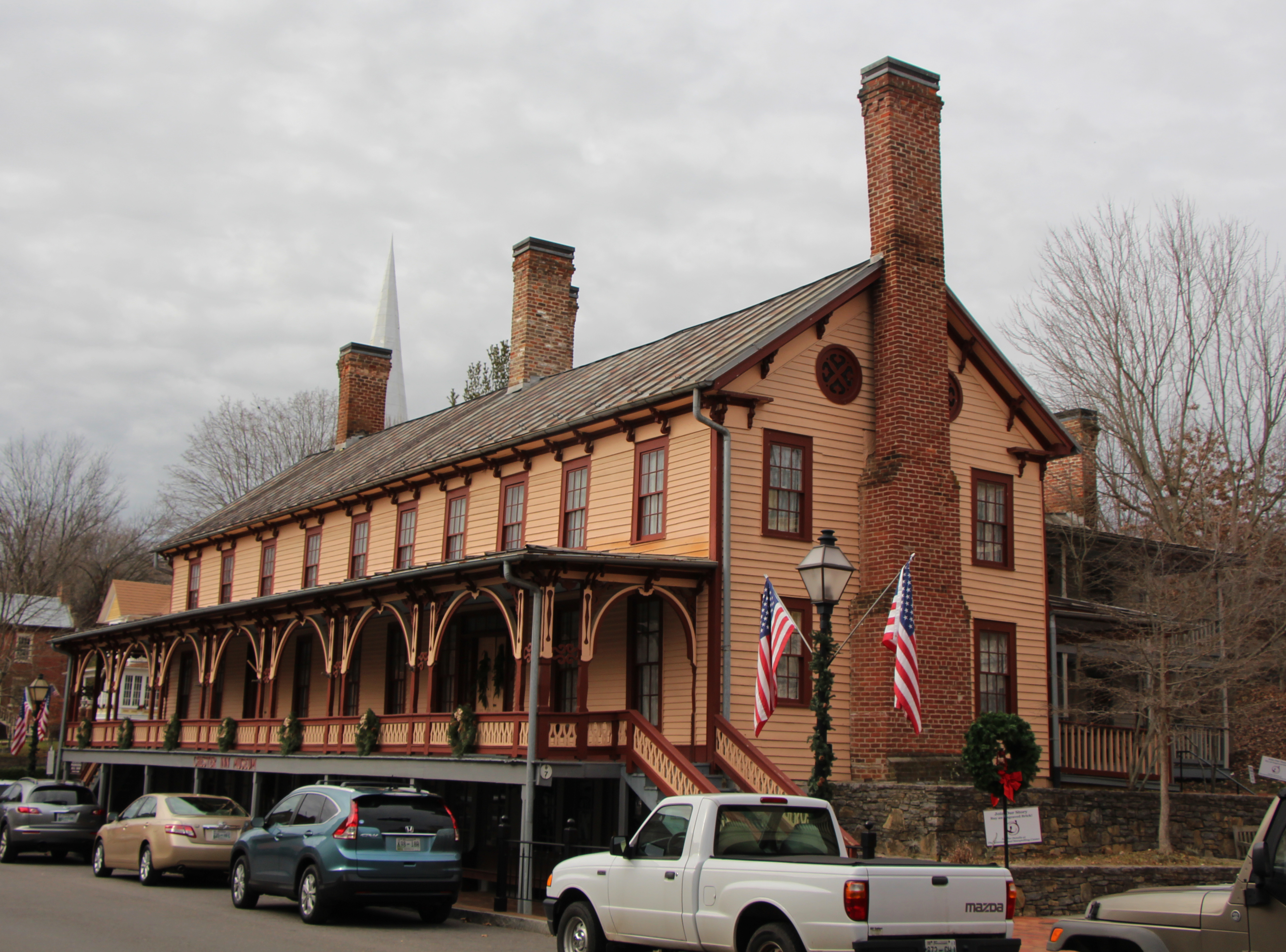
Chester Inn, one of many historic buildings in Jonesborough

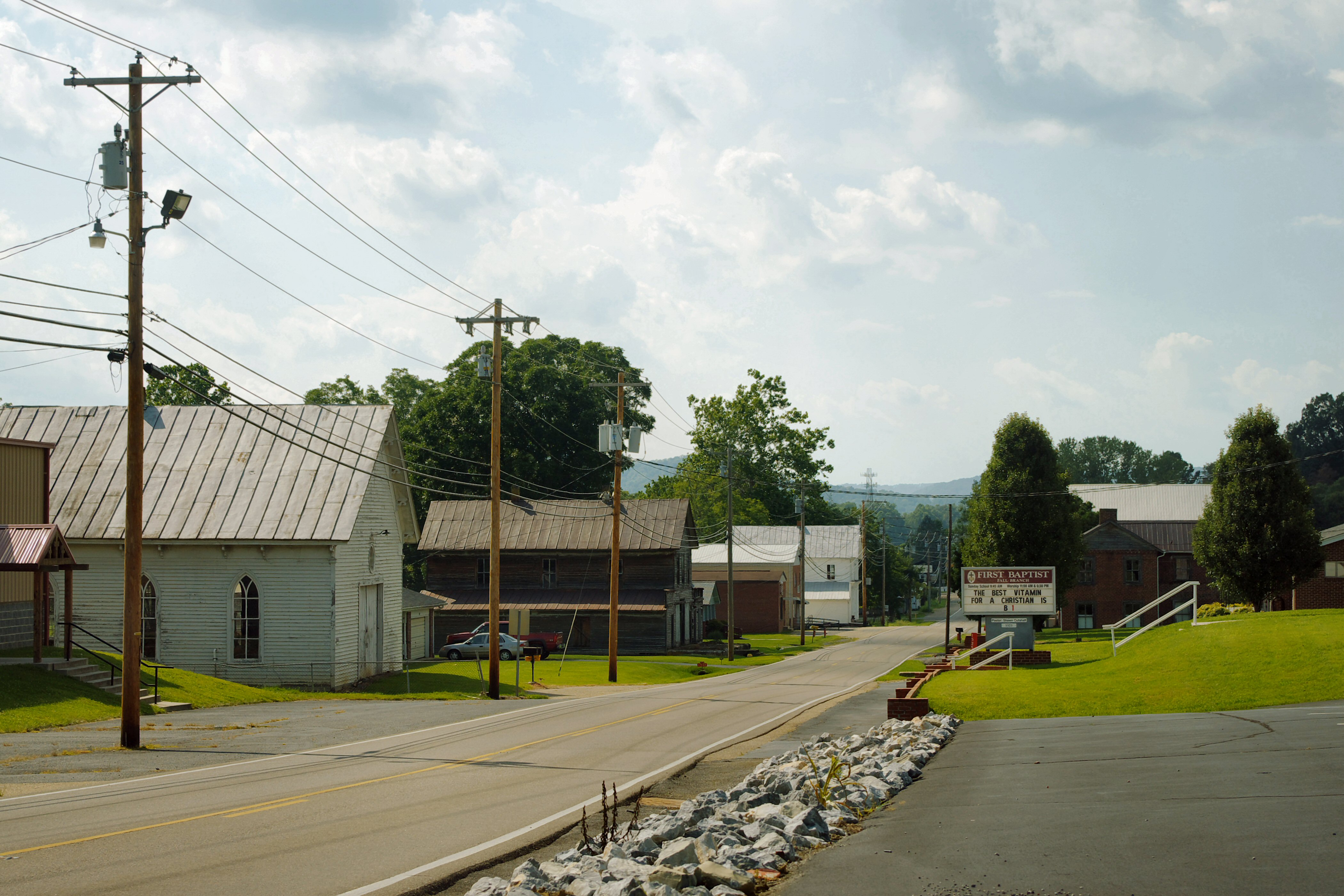
Fall Branch

=== Cities ===
- Johnson City (small portion in Carter County and Sullivan County)
- Watauga (mostly in Carter County)

=== Town ===
- Jonesborough (county seat)

=== Census-designated places ===
- Embreeville
- Fall Branch (partial)
- Gray
- Oak Grove
- Spurgeon (partial)
- Telford

=== Unincorporated communities ===
- Austin Springs
- Boone
- Boones Creek
- Bowmantown
- Bumpus Cove (partial)
- February
- Lamar
- Limestone
- Midway
- Mountain Home
- South Central
- Stewart Hill
- Sulphur Springs
- Washington College

== Notable residents ==
- Joseph Hardin, Sr. – Revolutionary War hero, and North Carolina militia colonel for the Western Counties, 1788;
- William Paxton Burts – First mayor of Fort Worth, Texas.

== Politics ==
Like most of East Tennessee, Washington County has been a Republican stronghold since the Civil War. No national Democratic candidate has won the county since 1856, although Lyndon Johnson came within 359 votes of Barry Goldwater in 1964 and Jimmy Carter came within 819 votes of Gerald Ford in 1976. Franklin Roosevelt is the only other Democrat to even cross the 40 percent mark. The only time the Republicans have failed to win the county since 1868, the first election it competed in Tennessee, came in 1912, when the Bull Moose Party divided the Republican vote and won a plurality.

United States presidential election results for Washington County, Tennessee
Year	Republican / Whig		Democratic		Third party(ies)	
Year	No.	%	No.	%	No.	%
1832	0	0.00%	735	100.00%	0	0.00%
1836	439	36.61%	760	63.39%	0	0.00%
1840	892	45.16%	1,083	54.84%	0	0.00%
1844	881	41.83%	1,225	58.17%	0	0.00%
1848	862	45.90%	1,016	54.10%	0	0.00%
1852	565	39.84%	853	60.16%	0	0.00%
1856	0	0.00%	1,334	61.70%	828	38.30%
1860	0	0.00%	62	2.63%	2,298	97.37%
1868	1,217	94.63%	69	5.37%	0	0.00%
1872	1,458	63.53%	837	36.47%	0	0.00%
1876	1,739	55.03%	1,421	44.97%	0	0.00%
1880	2,104	57.17%	1,576	42.83%	0	0.00%
1884	1,815	53.79%	1,559	46.21%	0	0.00%
1888	2,008	55.13%	1,534	42.12%	100	2.75%
1892	2,056	51.58%	1,722	43.20%	208	5.22%
1896	2,807	61.98%	1,661	36.67%	61	1.35%
1900	2,488	61.51%	1,496	36.98%	61	1.51%
1904	2,120	61.63%	1,268	36.86%	52	1.51%
1908	2,254	58.77%	1,574	41.04%	7	0.18%
1912	1,134	26.58%	1,531	35.89%	1,601	37.53%
1916	2,723	59.69%	1,831	40.14%	8	0.18%
1920	4,858	68.21%	2,260	31.73%	4	0.06%
1924	3,243	62.87%	1,839	35.65%	76	1.47%
1928	4,887	76.00%	1,543	24.00%	0	0.00%
1932	3,691	51.71%	3,345	46.86%	102	1.43%
1936	4,788	51.52%	4,448	47.86%	58	0.62%
1940	4,719	56.67%	3,565	42.81%	43	0.52%
1944	6,485	61.17%	4,060	38.29%	57	0.54%
1948	7,056	61.04%	4,023	34.80%	480	4.15%
1952	12,023	69.31%	5,245	30.24%	79	0.46%
1956	13,471	71.23%	5,314	28.10%	127	0.67%
1960	14,851	69.93%	6,283	29.59%	102	0.48%
1964	10,612	50.86%	10,253	49.14%	0	0.00%
1968	12,882	56.66%	4,930	21.68%	4,925	21.66%
1972	17,343	74.79%	5,284	22.79%	561	2.42%
1976	14,770	50.87%	13,951	48.05%	311	1.07%
1980	17,457	57.71%	11,599	38.35%	1,193	3.94%
1984	21,762	69.38%	9,452	30.13%	154	0.49%
1988	19,615	65.63%	10,087	33.75%	185	0.62%
1992	18,206	51.31%	13,071	36.84%	4,206	11.85%
1996	18,960	54.42%	13,259	38.06%	2,621	7.52%
2000	22,579	59.51%	14,769	38.93%	594	1.57%
2004	29,735	66.07%	14,944	33.20%	327	0.73%
2008	32,341	66.03%	15,941	32.54%	700	1.43%
2012	32,808	68.30%	14,325	29.82%	899	1.87%
2016	34,252	68.85%	13,024	26.18%	2,474	4.97%
2020	40,444	67.18%	18,638	30.96%	1,121	1.86%
2024	42,299	69.08%	18,131	29.61%	804	1.31%

== See also ==
- National Register of Historic Places listings in Washington County, Tennessee
