= Tennessee State Route 81 =

State highway in Tennessee, United States

State Route 81
- SR 81 highlighted in red

Route information
- Maintained by TDOT
- Length: 25.7 mi (41.4 km)

Major junctions
- South end: I-26 / US 23 / US 19W / SR 107 in Erwin
- SR 107 in Lamar
- North end: SR 93 near Fall Branch

Location
- Country: United States
- State: Tennessee
- Counties: Unicoi, Washington

Highway system
- Tennessee State Routes; Interstate; US; State
← I-81	→ SR 82

State Route 81 (SR 81) is a 25.7-mile-long (41.4 km) state highway in northeastern Tennessee. It travels in Unicoi and Washington counties. It connects Fall Branch with Erwin.

== Route description ==
SR 81 beings in Unicoi County at an interchange with I-26/US 23/US 19W (Exit 37) in Erwin (with the road continuing south as SR 107). It goes north from this interchange concurrent with SR 107. The two routes leave Erwin and continue north to parallel the Nolichucky River before crossing into Washington County.

SR 81/SR 107 continue north to pass through Embreeville, where they cross over a bridge over the Nolichucky River, before entering the community of Lamar, where SR 107 turns west and SR 81 continues north. SR 81 then crosses a second bridge over the Nolichucky River before having an intersection with SR 67. The highway then leaves Lamar and the Nolichucky River to continue north through rural farmland before having an intersection with SR 353 and entering Jonesborough. SR 81 then enters downtown and has intersections with two roads that provide access to U.S. Routes 11E and 321 and SR 34, Persimmon Ridge Road and Washington Drive. SR 81 then leaves Jonesborough and continues north through rural areas to junction with SR 75. SR 81 then continues north for several more miles before coming to an end at SR 93 about three miles (4.8 km) south of Fall Branch, just about one mile (1.6 km) south of its interchange with I-81.

== Junction list ==
County	Location	mi	km	Destinations	Notes
Unicoi	Erwin	0.0	0.0	I-26 / US 23 / US 19W / SR 107 east (Jonesborough Road) – Asheville, Johnson City, Kingsport, Erwin	I-26 exit 37; southern terminus & southern end of SR 107 concurrency
Washington	Lamar			SR 107 west (Erwin Highway) – Tusculum, Greeneville	Northern end of SR 107 concurrency
Washington	Lamar			SR 67 east (Cherokee Road) – Johnson City	Western terminus of SR 67
Washington	Jonesborough			SR 353 south (Old State Route 34) – South Central	Northern terminus of SR 353
Washington	Jonesborough			Persimmon Ridge Road/Truck Route To; US 11E / US 321 (West Jackson Boulevard/SR 34) – Tusculum, Greeneville	
Washington	Jonesborough			Washington Drive To US 11E / US 321 – Johnson City	
Washington				SR 75 (Bowmantown Road / Gray Station-Sulphur Springs Road) – Sulphur Springs, Bowmantown	
Washington		25.7	41.4	SR 93 to I-81 – Greeneville, Fall Branch, Kingsport	Northern terminus; access to I-81 via SR 93 north
1.000 mi = 1.609 km; 1.000 km = 0.621 mi: Concurrency terminus
