= February (disambiguation) =

February is the second month of the year.

February may also refer to:

== Film ==
- February (2003 film), a Thai romance-drama film
- February (2015 film), an American horror film, also known as The Blackcoat's Daughter

== Music ==
- "February", a song by A Thorn for Every Heart from their 2004 album Things Aren't So Beautiful Now
- "February", a song by the Appleseed Cast from their 2006 album Peregrine
- "February", a song by Dar Williams from her 1996 album Mortal City
- "February", a song by Thinking Fellers Union Local 282 from their 1994 album Strangers from the Universe
- Febuary (band), an American screamo band

== Other ==
- February, Tennessee, a community in the United States
