= Embreeville =

Embreeville is the name various places in the United States:

- Embreeville, Pennsylvania
- Embreeville, Tennessee
