= Austin Springs, Tennessee =

Austin Springs, Tennessee may refer to:

- Austin Springs, Washington County, Tennessee
- Austin Springs, Weakley County, Tennessee
