= Big Bald Mountain (disambiguation) =

Big Bald Mountain may refer to:

- Big Bald Mountain, New Brunswick, Canada
- Big Bald Mountain, Georgia, United States
- Big Bald, Tennessee and North Carolina, United States
