= Clarksville Iron Furnace =

- U.S. National Register of Historic Places
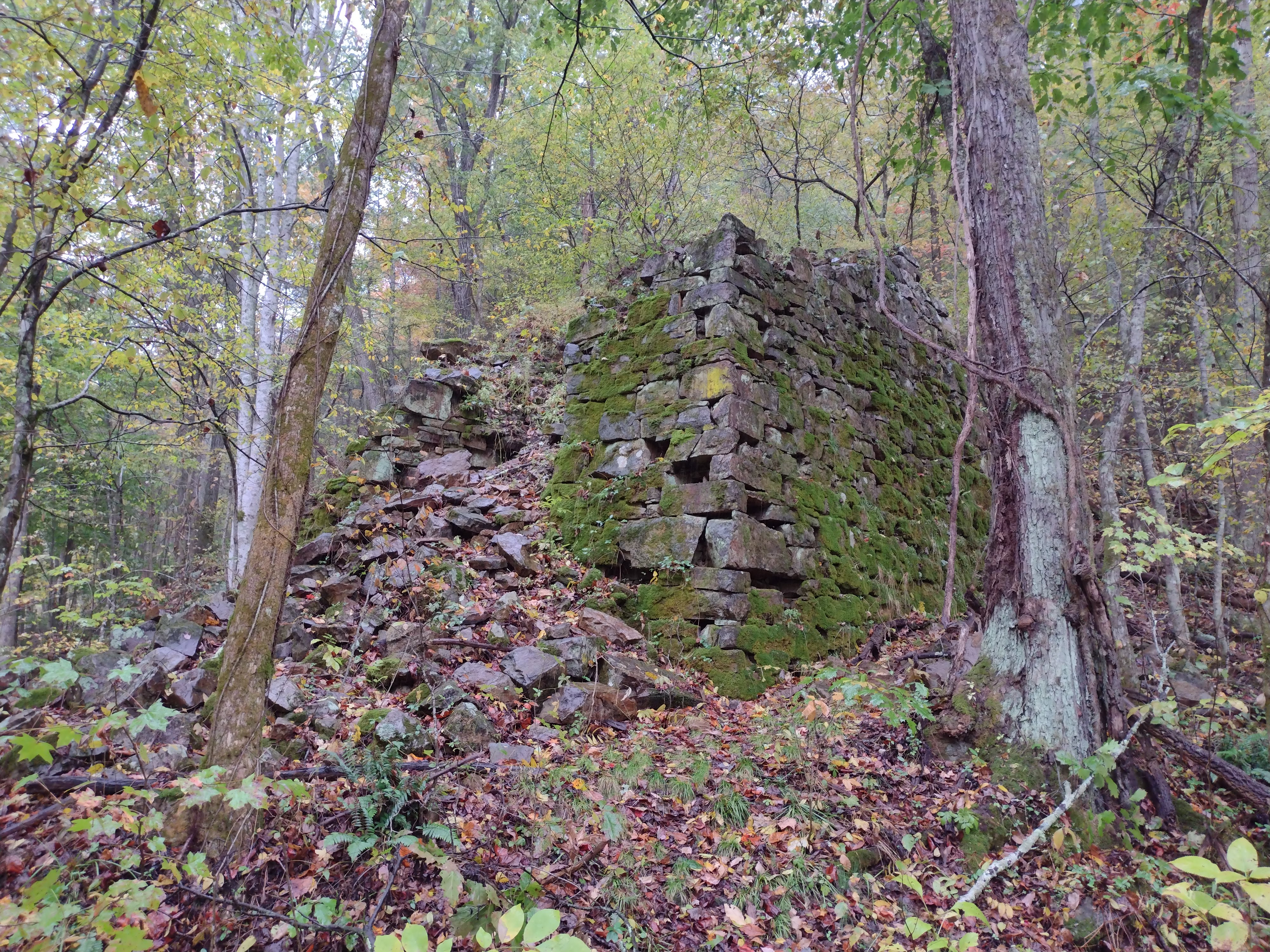

- Location within Tennessee Location within the United States
- Nearest city: Erwin, Tennessee
- Coordinates: 36°8′53″N 82°31′40″W
- Area: 8 acres (3.2 ha)
- Built: 1833
- NRHP reference No.: 73001852
- Added to NRHP: June 4, 1973

Clarksville Iron Furnace was a charcoal iron furnace in Unicoi County, Tennessee, built in 1833 and operated until 1844. Its ruins are in Cherokee National Forest and are listed on the National Register of Historic Places.

Clarksville Iron Furnace was built in 1833 by Edward West & Co., a business venture formed by Edward West, Elijah Embree, and Montgomery Stuart. Elijah Embree owned an iron ore deposit in Bumpass Cove and ironworks in Embreeville. The furnace was built to smelt iron ore mined in Bumpass Cove together with charcoal produced from the wood of trees cut from woodlands near the furnace. The furnace installation included a furnace stack and a bellows that was powered by a waterwheel. The site was selected because Clark's Creek could be used for water power; Bumpass Cove lacked a suitable water power source. A road was built to carry ore from Bumpass Cove, about 2.5 miles (4.0 km) away on the other side of a mountain ridge.

The furnace began operation in 1833 or 1834. Initially it was fairly successful, producing iron for use in making nails and wrought iron in Embree's iron works in Embreeville, as well as castings that were sold locally and material that was shipped out of the area on river flatboats. Within a few years, differences arose between the business partners. In 1837, West sold his share of the business to the other two partners, and in 1841 West and Stuart filed a lawsuit against Embree. Production ended abruptly in 1844 when the millrace that channeled water to the waterwheel failed, causing water to spill onto the furnace site. The resulting flood extinguished the fire in the furnace and chilled the material that was being smelted at the time. In order to restart the furnace, it would have been necessary to dismantle the stack and rebuild it; the owners chose to abandon the operation instead of rebuilding.

The ruins of the furnace are easiest to find and observe during the winter, after the surrounding trees and shrubs have lost their leaves.

== See also ==
- Elihu Embree
