= Grandview, Greene County, Tennessee =

- Unincorporated community
- Location within Tennessee Location within the United States
- Coordinates: 36°15′47″N 82°43′15″W
- Country: United States
- State: Tennessee
- County: Greene
- Elevation: 1,611 ft (491 m)
- Time zone: UTC-5 (Eastern (EST))
  - Summer (DST): UTC-4 (EDT)
- Area code: 423
- GNIS feature ID: 1315142

Grandview is an unincorporated community in Greene County, Tennessee, United States. Grandview is located on Tennessee State Route 351 9.2 miles (14.8 km) northeast of Greeneville.
