= Liberty Hill, Greene County, Tennessee =

Liberty Hill
- Unincorporated community
- Location within Tennessee Location within the United States
- Coordinates: 36°18′23″N 82°41′25″W
- Country: United States
- State: Tennessee
- County: Greene
- Elevation: 1,801 ft (549 m)
- Time zone: UTC-5 (Eastern (EST))
  - Summer (DST): UTC-4 (EDT)
- Area code: 423
- GNIS feature ID: 1315396

Liberty Hill is an unincorporated community in Greene County, Tennessee. Liberty Hill is 12.6 miles (20.3 km) northeast of Greeneville.
