= Cross Anchor, Tennessee =

Unincorporated community in Tennessee, US

Coordinates: 36.258°N 82.818°W

Cross Anchor is a small unincorporated community in north-central Greene County, Tennessee. It is located north of Greeneville and south of Baileyton.
