= Nolichucky Dam =

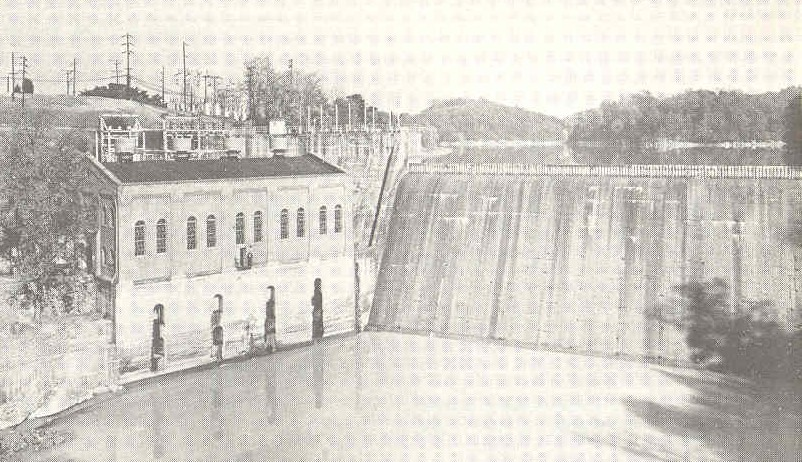
- Nolichucky Dam in the 1940s
- Location: Greene County, Tennessee, U.S.
- Coordinates: 36.06478°N 82.86653°W

Dam and spillways
- Impounds: Nolichucky River

Nolichucky Dam is a dam on the Nolichucky River near Greeneville, Tennessee, maintained by the Tennessee Valley Authority (TVA). The dam is located just over 46 miles (74 km) upstream from the mouth of the Nolichucky, and impounds Davy Crockett Lake, which extends 6 miles (9.7 km) upstream from the dam.

The dam is a concrete gravity overflow type dam 94 feet (29 m) high and 482 feet (147 m) long. The dam has an ogee-type spillway with a flashboard crest. Its reservoir, Davy Crockett Lake (named for the folk figure who was born a few miles upstream from the modern dam site in 1786), has roughly 800 acres (320 ha) of water surface.

Nolichucky Dam was built by the Tennessee Eastern Electric Company (TEEC) in 1912-1913 for hydroelectricity generation. The dam was initially equipped with two generators, and TEEC added two more in 1923. In 1941, the East Tennessee Light & Power Company obtained ownership of the dam when it purchased TEEC's assets. The Tennessee Valley Authority purchased East Tennessee Light & Power in 1945 for a lump sum that included $1.47 million for Nolichucky Dam. TVA made various improvements, and at its height, the dam was capable of producing 10,640 kilowatts of electricity. TVA used the dam for power generation until 1972, when sediment buildup in Davy Crockett Lake made continued electricity generation impractical. The dam and reservoir are now used for flood control and recreation; the reservoir is a wildlife management area. The continued sediment buildup is resulting in upstream flooding.

Heavy rainfall from Hurricane Helene on September 27, 2024 caused major flooding on the Nolichucky River leading the TVA to issue a Condition Yellow warning that the dam could fail or breach. At 12:13 am on September 28 TVA issued a Condition Red Warning and that a breach or failure is imminent, which would cause life threatening flooding in areas below dam. The dam did not fail, however the 111 year old powerhouse had to be torn down due to damage from the floodwaters.
