= Greene County, Tennessee =

County in Tennessee, United States

- County
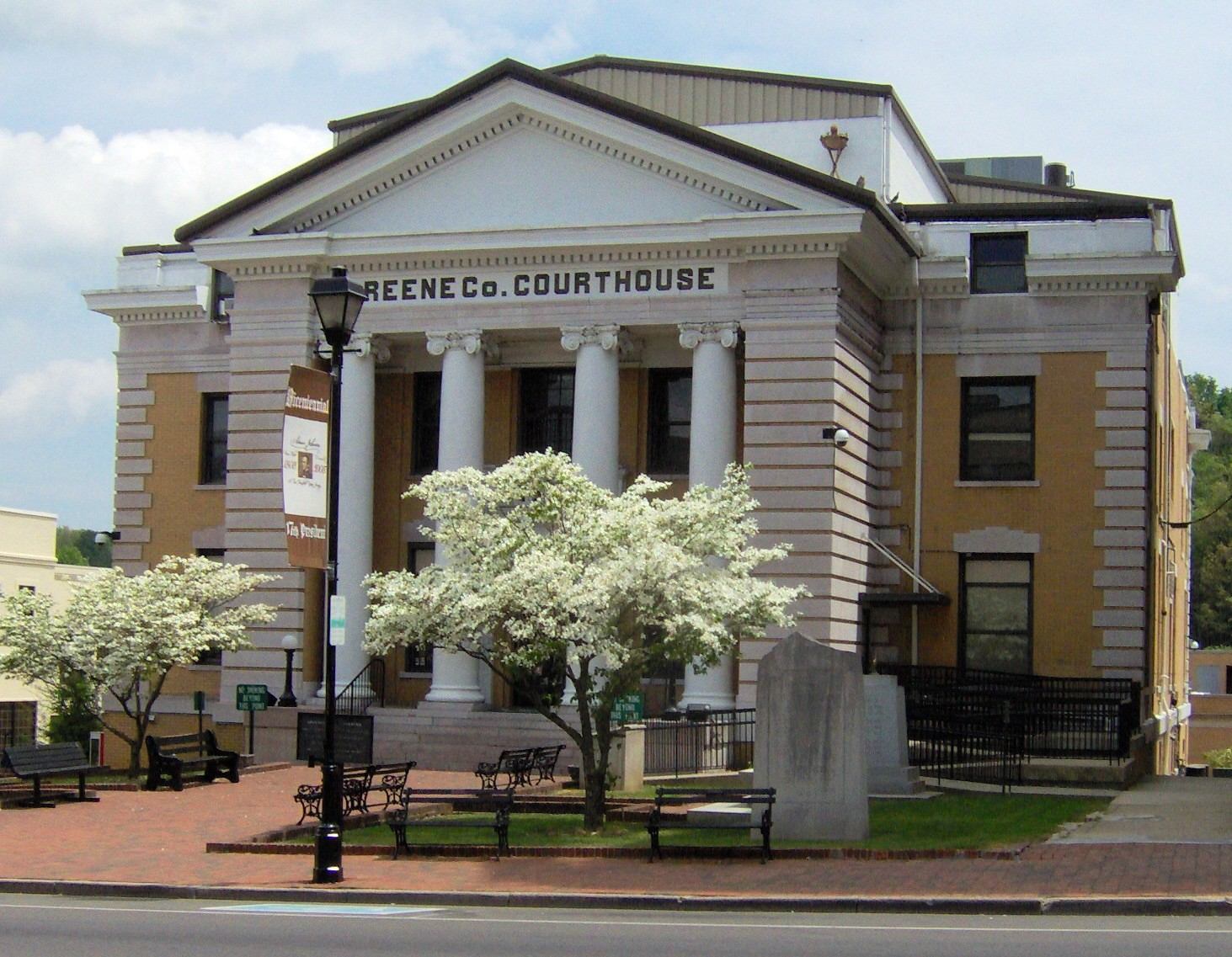
- Greene County Courthouse in Greeneville

- Flag Seal

- Location within the U.S. state of Tennessee
- Coordinates: 36°10′N 82°51′W
- Country: United States
- State: Tennessee
- Founded: 1783
- Named for: Nathanael Greene
- Seat: Greeneville
- Largest town: Greeneville

Area
  - Total: 624 sq mi (1,620 km^{2})
  - Land: 622 sq mi (1,610 km^{2})
  - Water: 2.0 sq mi (5.2 km^{2}) 0.3%

Population (2020)
  - Total: 70,152
  - Estimate (2025): 73,831 ▲
  - Density: 111/sq mi (43/km^{2})
- Time zone: UTC−5 (Eastern)
  - Summer (DST): UTC−4 (EDT)
- Congressional district: 1st
- Website: greenecountytngov.com

Greene County is a county located on the eastern border of the U.S. state of Tennessee. As of the 2020 census, the population was 70,152. Its county seat is Greeneville. Greene County comprises the Greeneville, TN Micropolitan Statistical Area.

== History ==
Greene County developed from the "Nolichucky settlement," established by pioneer Jacob Brown on land leased in the early 1770s from the Cherokee people. The Nolichucky settlement was aligned with the Watauga settlement, centered in modern Elizabethton.

After the United States became independent, Greene County was formed in 1783 from the original Washington County, North Carolina, part of the former Washington District. The county is named for Major General Nathanael Greene (1742–1786), a major general in the Continental Army from Rhode Island. John Crockett, father of Davy Crockett, and his wife settled in the county near Limestone. Davy Crockett was born there in 1786. At the time, the area was part of the extra-legal state Franklin.

Greene County is the home of Tusculum College, the oldest college in Tennessee; the state's oldest Methodist congregation (the Ebenezer Methodist Church, near Chuckey), and the state's second oldest continuously cultivated farm (Elmwood Farm, part of the Earnest Farms Historic District). Revolutionary War veteran, and state legislator, Col. Joseph Hardin made Greene County his home for a period of time, serving as justice of the peace and as one of the original trustees of Tusculum (then Greeneville) College.

As with yeomen farmers in much of East Tennessee, those in Greene County were generally Unionist and opposed to secession on the eve of the Civil War. In Tennessee's Ordinance of Secession referendum on June 8, 1861, Greene Countians voted against secession by a vote of 2,691 to 744. Following the vote (the call for secession was passed statewide), the second session of the East Tennessee Convention convened in Greeneville. It unsuccessfully called for a separate, Union-aligned state to be formed in East Tennessee.

A railroad bridge near Mosheim was among those destroyed by the East Tennessee bridge-burning conspiracy in November 1861. Several of the conspirators who had taken part in the burning of this bridge were later captured and executed by Confederate supporters, including Jacob Hensie, Henry Fry, Jacob and Henry Harmon, and noted local potter Alex Haun.

== Geography ==
According to the U.S. Census Bureau, the county has a total area of 624 square miles (1,620 km^{2}), of which 622 square miles (1,610 km^{2}) is land and 2.0 square miles (5.2 km^{2}) (0.3%) is water. Most of Greene County is located within the Ridge-and-Valley Appalachians, a range characterized by long, narrow ridges alternating with similarly shaped valleys. Bays Mountain, a prominent ridge in this range, forms much of Greene's northern border with Hawkins County. The extreme southeastern part of Greene County is located within the Blue Ridge Mountains, specifically a subrange of the Blue Ridge known as the Bald Mountains. This range straddles Greene's border with North Carolina, and includes the county's two highest points: Gravel Knob, which rises to over 4,840 feet (1,480 m), and 4,844-foot (1,476 m) Camp Creek Bald (it's uncertain which is higher due to lack of an exact measurement for Gravel Knob's elevation).

Greene County is drained by the Nolichucky River, which traverses the southern half of the county. This river is impounded by Nolichucky Dam south of Greeneville, creating Davy Crockett Lake.

=== Major highways ===
- I-81
- US 11E
- US 11E Bus.
- US 321
- SR 70
- SR 93
- SR 107
- SR 172
- SR 340
- SR 348
- SR 349
- SR 350
- SR 351

=== Adjacent counties ===
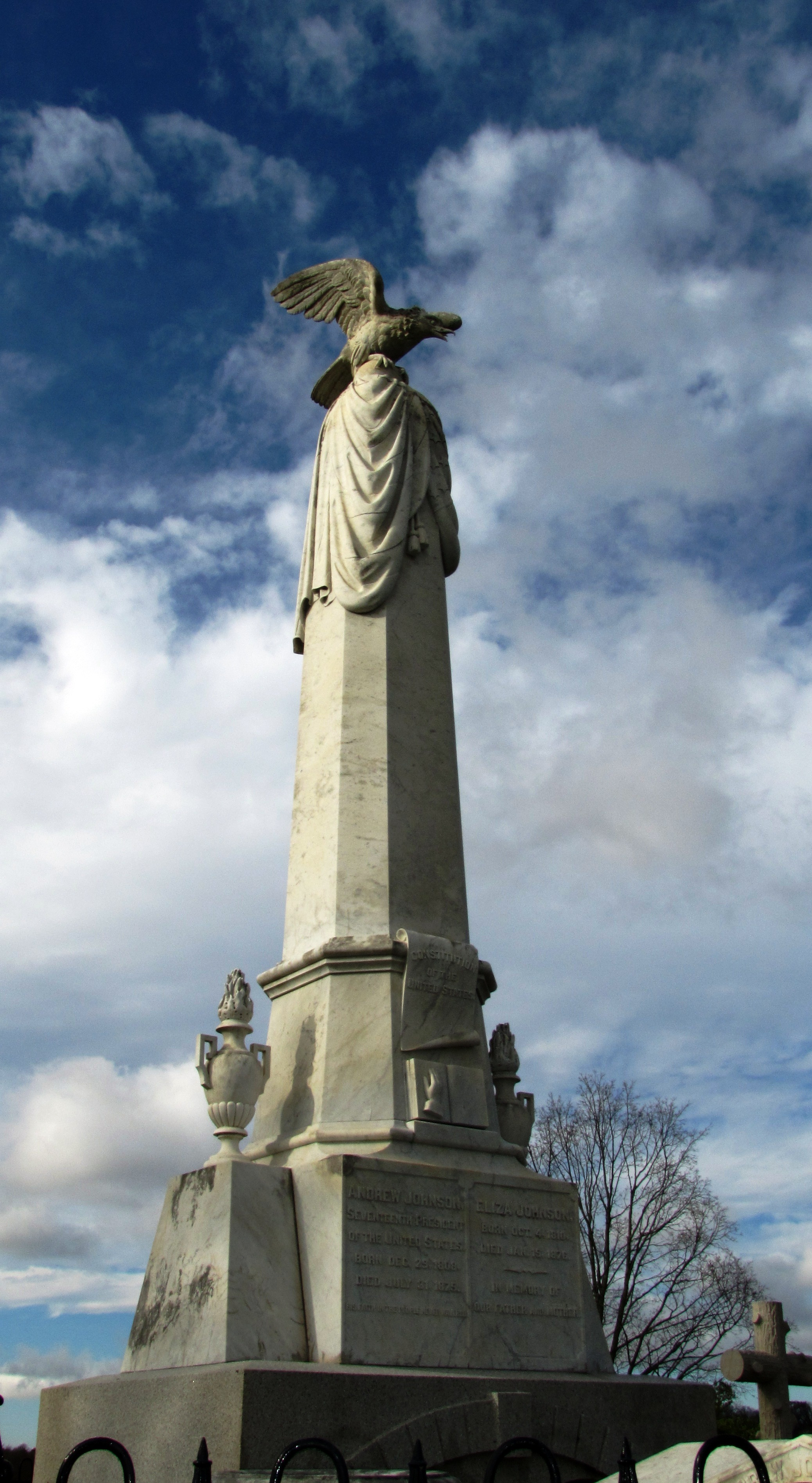
Grave of Andrew Johnson

- Hawkins County (north)
- Washington County (east)
- Unicoi County (southeast)
- Madison County, North Carolina (south)
- Cocke County (southwest)
- Hamblen County (west)

=== National protected areas ===
- Andrew Johnson National Cemetery
- Andrew Johnson National Historic Site
- Appalachian Trail (part)
- Cherokee National Forest (part)

=== State protected areas ===
- Bible Covered Bridge State Historic Site
- Joachim Bible Refuge
- David Crockett Birthplace State Park (part)
- Lick Creek Bottoms Wildlife Management Area
- Nolichucky Wildlife Management Area
- Rocky Fork State Park (part)

=== Other historic sites ===
- Earnest Farms Historic District
- Greeneville Historic District
- Maden Hall Farm

== Government ==
=== Elected Officials ===
==== County Mayor ====
Kevin Morrison was elected County Mayor in August 2018 and began as mayor on September 1, 2018.

==== County Commission ====
Members of the county commission are elected by geographic district. They are as follows:

- District 1: Baileyton, Ottway, West Pines
  - David McLain
  - Dale Tucker
  - Kathy Crawford
- District 2: Chuckey, Chuckey Doak
  - Brad Peters
  - Chase Murray
  - Travis Hoxie
- District 3: Doak, Tusculum View
  - Robin Quillen
  - Jason Cobble
  - Jan Kiker
- District 4: Camp Creek, Courthouse
  - E.J. Swatsell
  - Lyle Parton
  - Bryan Jones
- District 5: Debusk, Nolachuckey, Middle School, South GreeneWesley Holt
  - Wesley Holt
  - Terry Cannon
  - Gary Shelton
- District 6: McDonald, Mosheim
  - Larkin Clemmer
  - Josh Kesterson
  - Tony Jones
- District 7: Glenwood, Greeneville High School
  - Teddy Lawing
  - Paul Burkey
  - Lisa Anderson

==== Constables ====
Constables are elected law enforcement officials pursuant to T.C.A. 8–1–101. Constables, much like County Commissioners are elected by geographic district. They are as follows:

- District 1: Baileyton, Ottway, West Pines
  - David Brown
- District 2: Chuckey, Chuckey Doak
  - Wayne Wilhoit
- District 3: Doak, Tusculum View
  - Kenneth Bitner
- District 4: Camp Creek, Courthouse
  - William Parton
- District 5: Debusk, Nolachuckey, Middle School, South Greene
  - Freddie Sams
- District 6: McDonald, Mosheim
  - Keith Self
- District 7: Glenwood, Greeneville High School
  - Timothy Vonglis

=== Presidential elections ===
Like all of East Tennessee, Greene County is a Republican stronghold. The last Democratic presidential candidate to carry this county was Franklin D. Roosevelt in 1936.

United States presidential election results for Greene County, Tennessee
Year	Republican		Democratic		Third party(ies)	
Year	No.	%	No.	%	No.	%
1912	1,650	33.18%	2,076	41.75%	1,247	25.08%
1916	3,055	57.54%	2,254	42.46%	0	0.00%
1920	5,677	65.97%	2,924	33.98%	5	0.06%
1924	3,282	55.66%	2,586	43.85%	29	0.49%
1928	3,599	61.06%	2,295	38.94%	0	0.00%
1932	3,223	42.79%	4,264	56.61%	45	0.60%
1936	4,313	47.62%	4,708	51.98%	36	0.40%
1940	4,587	50.21%	4,406	48.23%	142	1.55%
1944	4,922	64.21%	2,726	35.56%	17	0.22%
1948	4,375	55.56%	3,282	41.68%	218	2.77%
1952	6,864	64.98%	3,656	34.61%	43	0.41%
1956	7,396	64.87%	3,949	34.63%	57	0.50%
1960	8,835	66.55%	4,406	33.19%	35	0.26%
1964	6,913	53.89%	5,916	46.11%	0	0.00%
1968	7,957	58.26%	2,947	21.58%	2,753	20.16%
1972	9,772	76.89%	2,764	21.75%	173	1.36%
1976	8,664	54.56%	7,070	44.52%	146	0.92%
1980	10,704	63.13%	5,822	34.34%	430	2.54%
1984	13,215	73.15%	4,763	26.37%	87	0.48%
1988	11,947	69.73%	5,077	29.63%	108	0.63%
1992	9,912	47.48%	7,857	37.64%	3,106	14.88%
1996	9,779	53.10%	6,885	37.39%	1,752	9.51%
2000	12,540	60.24%	7,909	37.99%	367	1.76%
2004	16,382	67.71%	7,635	31.56%	177	0.73%
2008	17,151	69.52%	7,110	28.82%	409	1.66%
2012	17,245	72.19%	6,225	26.06%	417	1.75%
2016	18,562	78.71%	4,216	17.88%	805	3.41%
2020	22,259	79.25%	5,199	18.51%	629	2.24%
2024	25,586	82.28%	5,145	16.55%	364	1.17%

== Demographics ==
Historical population
Census	Pop.	Note	%±
1790	7,741		—
1800	7,610		−1.7%
1810	9,713		27.6%
1820	11,324		16.6%
1830	14,410		27.3%
1840	16,076		11.6%
1850	17,824		10.9%
1860	19,004		6.6%
1870	21,668		14.0%
1880	24,005		10.8%
1890	26,614		10.9%
1900	30,596		15.0%
1910	31,083		1.6%
1920	32,824		5.6%
1930	35,119		7.0%
1940	39,405		12.2%
1950	41,048		4.2%
1960	42,163		2.7%
1970	47,630		13.0%
1980	54,422		14.3%
1990	55,853		2.6%
2000	62,909		12.6%
2010	68,831		9.4%
2020	70,152		1.9%
2025 (est.)	73,831	▲	5.2%
U.S. Decennial Census; 1790-1960 1790-1990 1900-1990; 1990-2000 2010-2014

=== Racial and ethnic composition ===
Greene County, Tennessee – Racial and ethnic composition Note: the US Census treats Hispanic/Latino as an ethnic category. This table excludes Latinos from the racial categories and assigns them to a separate category. Hispanics/Latinos may be of any race.
Race / ethnicity (NH = Non-Hispanic)	Pop 1980	Pop 1990	Pop 2000	Pop 2010	Pop 2020	% 1980	% 1990	% 2000	% 2010	% 2020
White alone (NH)	52,713	54,323	60,309	64,637	63,143	96.86%	97.26%	95.87%	93.91%	90.01%
Black or African American alone (NH)	1,229	1,202	1,320	1,355	1,308	2.26%	2.15%	2.10%	1.97%	1.86%
Native American or Alaska Native alone (NH)	53	89	100	150	142	0.10%	0.16%	0.16%	0.22%	0.20%
Asian alone (NH)	55	69	167	249	299	0.10%	0.12%	0.27%	0.36%	0.43%
Native Hawaiian or Pacific Islander alone (NH)	x	x	15	11	14	x	x	0.02%	0.02%	0.02%
Other race alone (NH)	62	7	37	36	194	0.11%	0.01%	0.06%	0.05%	0.28%
Mixed race or Multiracial (NH)	x	x	320	703	2,517	x	x	0.51%	1.02%	3.59%
Hispanic or Latino (any race)	310	163	641	1,690	2,535	0.57%	0.29%	1.02%	2.46%	3.61%
Total	54,422	55,853	62,909	68,831	70,152	100.00%	100.00%	100.00%	100.00%	100.00%

=== 2020 census ===
As of the 2020 census, there were 70,152 people, 28,738 households, and 18,481 families residing in the county. The median age was 44.8 years; 19.7% of residents were under the age of 18 and 22.0% were 65 years of age or older. For every 100 females there were 96.2 males, and for every 100 females age 18 and over there were 93.5 males age 18 and over.

The racial makeup of the county was 91.0% White, 2.0% Black or African American, 0.3% American Indian and Alaska Native, 0.4% Asian, <0.1% Native Hawaiian and Pacific Islander, 1.5% from some other race, and 4.8% from two or more races. Hispanic or Latino residents of any race comprised 3.6% of the population.

32.7% of residents lived in urban areas, while 67.3% lived in rural areas.

Of the 28,738 households, 26.5% had children under the age of 18 living in them. Of all households, 47.8% were married-couple households, 18.5% were households with a male householder and no spouse or partner present, and 27.0% were households with a female householder and no spouse or partner present. About 28.9% of all households were made up of individuals and 14.3% had someone living alone who was 65 years of age or older.

There were 32,154 housing units, of which 10.6% were vacant. Among occupied housing units, 72.8% were owner-occupied and 27.2% were renter-occupied. The homeowner vacancy rate was 1.5% and the rental vacancy rate was 7.0%.

=== 2000 census ===
As of the census of 2000, there were 62,909 people, 25,756 households, and 18,132 families residing in the county. The population density was 101 people per square mile (39 people/km^{2}). There were 28,116 housing units at an average density of 45 units per square mile (17/km^{2}). The racial makeup of the county was 96.42% White, 2.11% Black or African American, 0.18% Native American, 0.27% Asian, 0.02% Pacific Islander, 0.43% from other races, and 0.56% from two or more races. 1.02% of the population were Hispanic or Latino of any race.

Farm in eastern Greene County

There were 25,756 households, out of which 29.20% had children under the age of 18 living with them, 55.70% were married couples living together, 10.80% had a female householder with no husband present, and 29.60% were non-families. 25.80% of all households were made up of individuals, and 10.70% had someone living alone who was 65 years of age or older. The average household size was 2.38 and the average family size was 2.84.

In the county, the population was spread out, with 22.20% under the age of 18, 8.10% from 18 to 24, 28.70% from 25 to 44, 26.10% from 45 to 64, and 14.80% who were 65 years of age or older. The median age was 39 years. For every 100 females there were 95.10 males. For every 100 females age 18 and over, there were 91.40 males.

The median income for a household in the county was $30,382, and the median income for a family was $36,889. Males had a median income of $26,331 versus $20,304 for females. The per capita income for the county was $15,746. About 11.20% of families and 14.50% of the population were below the poverty line, including 19.00% of those under age 18 and 16.70% of those age 65 or over.

== Education ==
There are two school districts: Greene County School District and Greeneville City School District. The latter includes the Greeneville city limits, and the former includes all other areas of the county.

Public schools in Greene County school system include the following:

- Baileyton Elementary
- Camp Creek Elementary
- Chuckey Elementary
- Doak Elementary
- McDonald Elementary
- Mosheim Elementary
- Nolachuckey Elementary
- Chuckey-Doak Middle School
- Chuckey-Doak High School
- North Greene Middle School
- North Greene High School
- South Greene Middle School
- South Greene High School
- West Greene Middle School
- West Greene High School

Public schools that are within Greene County but are part of the Greeneville City School System include:

- Eastview Elementary
- Hal Henard Elementary
- Highland Elementary
- Tusculum View Elementary
- Greeneville Middle School
- Greeneville High School
- Greene Technology Center

== Hospitals ==
Two hospitals are located in Greene County, Greeneville Community Hospital West campus and Greeneville Community East campus. These hospitals were formally Takoma Regional Hospital and Laughlin Memorial Hospital, respectively, after Ballad Health formed from the merger between Mountain States Health Alliance and Wellmont Health System.

== Communities ==
=== City ===
- Tusculum

=== Towns ===
- Baileyton
- Greeneville (county seat)
- Mosheim

=== Census-designated place ===
- Fall Branch (partial)

=== Unincorporated communities ===
- Afton
- Camp Creek
- Cedar Creek
- Chuckey
- Cross Anchor
- DeBusk
- Grandview
- Horse Creek
- Jearoldstown
- Liberty Hill
- Limestone
- Midway
- Mohawk
- Newmansville
- Ottway
- Rheatown
- Romeo
- St. James
- South Greene
- Warrensburg

== Notable person ==
- Rachel Belden Brooks (c. 1829–1910), American pioneer

== See also ==
- National Register of Historic Places listings in Greene County, Tennessee
