= DeBusk, Tennessee =

Unincorporated community in Tennessee, US

Coordinates: 36°06′15″N 82°52′45″W

DeBusk is an unincorporated community in central Greene County, Tennessee. It is located 1.4 miles (2.3 km) south of Greeneville.

== Education ==
South Greene Middle School
