= Lost Cove, North Carolina =

- Ghost town
- Location within the state of North Carolina
- Coordinates: 36°4′15″N 82°24′08″W
- Country: United States
- State: North Carolina
- County: Yancey
- Established: ~1861
- Named for: Local legend stating that the area was not claimed by North Carolina or Tennessee
- Elevation: 3,268 ft (996 m)

Population (2010)
  - Total: 0
- Time zone: UTC-5 (Eastern (EST))
  - Summer (DST): UTC-4 (EDT)
- ZIP code: 28714
- Area code: 828
- GNIS feature ID: 1021291

Lost Cove is a ghost town in Yancey County, North Carolina. The town was first settled by Morgan Bailey shortly before the Civil War. The town is located in the Poplar Gorge above the Nolichucky River on the Tennessee-North Carolina border. Originally, the settlement was supported by logging, railroading, moonshine-making, and farming industries. 3rd North Carolina Mounted Infantry soldier Morgan Bailey was its first resident, and at its height, Lost Cove had about 100 residents, 13 to 15 houses, two sawmills, a cemetery, and a Free Will Baptist church called the Tipton Chapel that was also used as a schoolhouse. Several factors contributed to the town's abandonment including rough terrain, isolation, and the end of passenger railroad stops. In 1957, the last family left Lost Cove, leaving it deserted. Fires in 2007 burned most of the structures down. As of December 2007, the town is still accessible to those willing to hike. Visitors to the area come to see the cemetery, Swin Miller's rusted Chevy still lying in a ditch, and the three houses that remain.

== Railroads and logging ==
Although Lost Cove is believed to have been founded around the time of the Civil War, the town did not begin to prosper until the logging industry made Lost Cove a viable stop on the railroad tracks. With its location in the mountains, Lost Cove was an ideal logging area that provided many trees from the surrounding Pisgah National Forest. Logging industries and railroads supported the funding to build a school in the town. Due to the supply of wood beginning to diminish, the railroad stopped servicing the town in order to focus on other industries like coal. With a major part of the economy deteriorated, residents lobbied to build a road into Lost Cove. Legislators denied this request and the people living in the town slowly began to move away until the town was abandoned in 1957.

== Moonshine ==
Moonshine was an important part of Lost Cove's economy. While some families made it for their own personal use, others would turn a profit by selling or trading moonshine to nearby townsfolk or men passing through on the railroad. One of the reasons that moonshiners were able to prosper in Lost Cove was that judges trying to control the problem were unsure of which jurisdiction the town fell in. Because it was situated on the Tennessee-North Carolina border and was very isolated, Lost Cove created an environment where moonshiners came to do business.

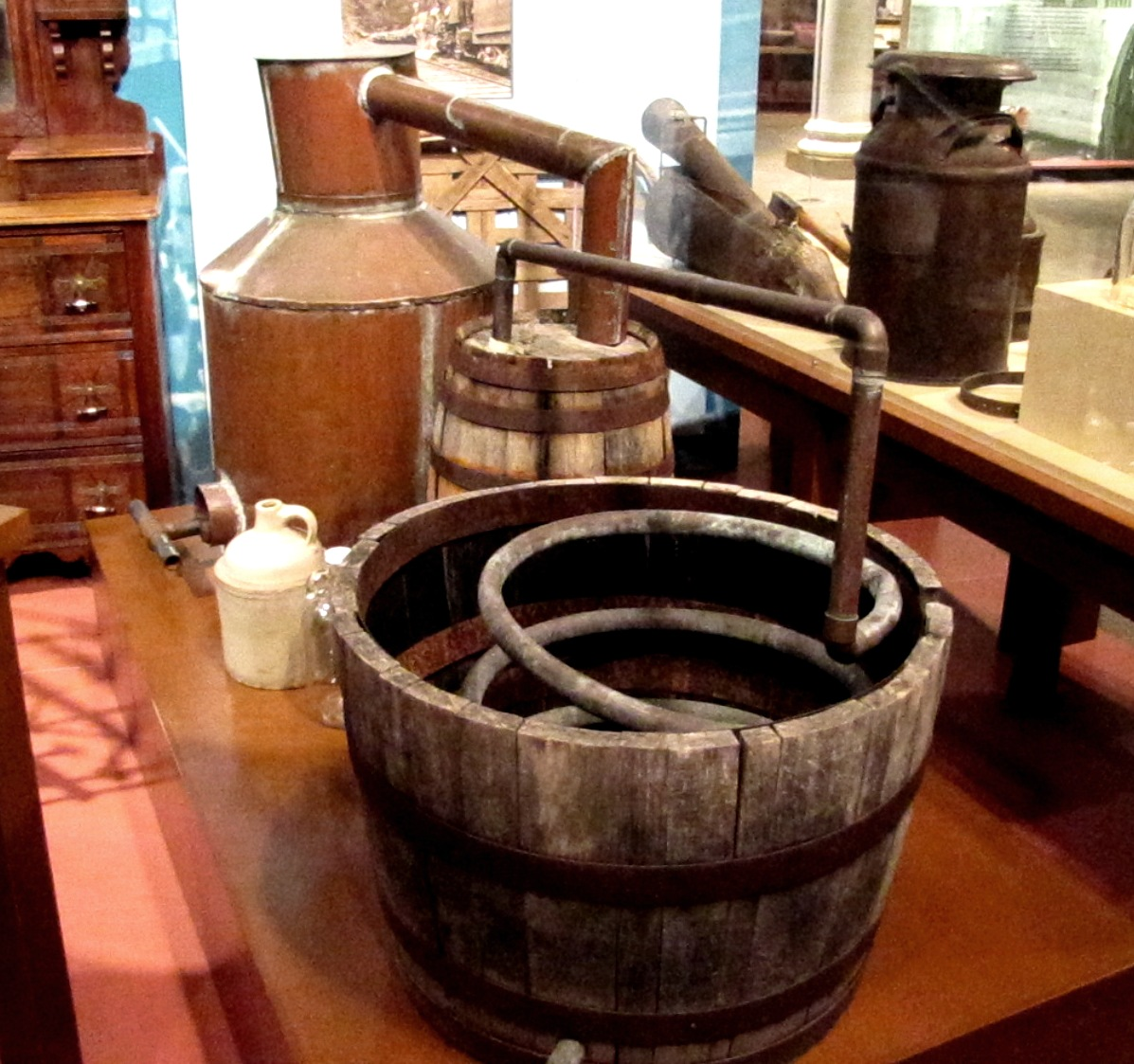
Equipment used to create moonshine or "illicit whiskey."
