= Rachel Belden Brooks =

African-American pioneer (1829–1910)

Rachel Belden Brooks (c. 1829–October 12, 1910) was an American pioneer who traveled from Tennessee to the Oregon Territory as a person held as a slave. In 1857, Oregon voters approved the Constitution of Oregon, which made slavery illegal, and also made it illegal for people of African descent to own real estate, make contracts, vote, or use the legal system. Despite this, Belden Brooks continued to be held as a slave until 1863 and in 1865 she used the legal system to sue her previous enslaver's estate, and was awarded $1,000.

== Early life ==
Rachel Belden was born in Greene County, Tennessee, in 1828 or 1829. In 1842 she was sold to Daniel Delaney Sr. in Tennessee for $450 (~$15,013 in 2025). Belden then traveled with the Delany family on their journey from Tennessee to the Oregon Territory. On the trail, Belden was tasked with caring for Daniel Delaney's wife. After settling near Salem, Oregon, Belden Brooks continued to live with the Delaneys as a slave. Another pioneer, John Minto, who traveled on the Oregon trail with the Delaney family and lived in close proximity to them later wrote of Daniel Delaney: "He seemed to read his bible chiefly to find in it support for his dominion over the soul and body of his female slave."

== Later life ==
In the early 1860s Belden was manumitted. She married Nathan Brooks, aged 70, on September 15, 1863. White minister John Stipp officiated at their wedding; the race of the minister would have been notable at the time, as evidenced by the local news coverage of the marriage between Black residents America Waldo Bogle and Richard Bogle, which was also officiated by a white minister on January 1 of the same year. At the time of the marriage Belden Brooks already had two sons, assumed to be the children of Delaney Sr., and Brooks had five children. Together, Belden Brooks and Brooks later had two sons. They lived on the farm of Daniel Waldo. Belden Brooks died on October 12, 1910.

== Murder and court case ==
On January 9, 1865, Daniel Delaney was shot and killed by two men who were subsequently hanged for their crime. The two men had been searching for cash on the property. The only witness to the crime was Belden Brooks' son, Jack, aged seven or eight, who lived on the Delaney property. At the murder trial, Jack was put on the witness stand. The defense objected to Jack being called to trial because a black person, "could not, under the law, testify in a criminal trial where a white man was on trial." That motion was overruled. However, Jack was then rejected as a witness after he could not explain what it meant to be "sworn" and to be a "witness", because "the boy had not sufficient intelligence to take the oath."

Letter from the lawyer of Rachel Belden Brooks and Nathan Brooks regarding $1,000 settlement. Page 1

After Delaney's death, Rachel sued the estate for $10,333 in civil court. This amount was for payment for work and services by her and her son Noah Newman (over a combined total of 27 years and 10 months). She was awarded $1,000, as it was argued that since she and her son were housed and fed by the Delaneys, any additional costs were negated.
