= Boone, Tennessee =

Unincorporated community in Tennessee, US

Coordinates: 36°22′41″N 82°26′15″W

Boone is an unincorporated community in Washington County, in the U.S. state of Tennessee.

The community was named for pioneer Daniel Boone.
