= Bumpus Cove =

- Unincorporated community & former mining area
- Location within Tennessee Location within the United States
- Coordinates: 36°09′15″N 82°29′15″W
- Country: United States
- State: Tennessee
- Counties: Unicoi and Washington
- Elevation: 1,778 ft (542 m)
- Time zone: UTC-5 (Eastern (EST))
  - Summer (DST): UTC-4 (EDT)
- Area code: 423
- GNIS feature ID: 1327761

Bumpus Cove (formerly known as Bumpass Cove) is a former mining area and a census-designated place in Unicoi County and Washington County, Tennessee, United States. Large-scale mining of zinc, manganese, iron, and lead began in the 1770s, and the mines were a critical source of iron for the Confederate States of America during the American Civil War. Mining continued through the 1960s, when all economically viable ore deposits were mined out. In 1972 a company arranged to use part of the area as a landfill, and over the next few years the company allowed dumped hazardous waste to contaminate the land. Local residents organized to oppose the continued operation of the landfill, and it closed in 1979. The land went through the Superfund cleanup process between 1984 and 2002. The area was badly damaged during Hurricane Helene in 2024, including the loss of many homes.

== Mining history ==
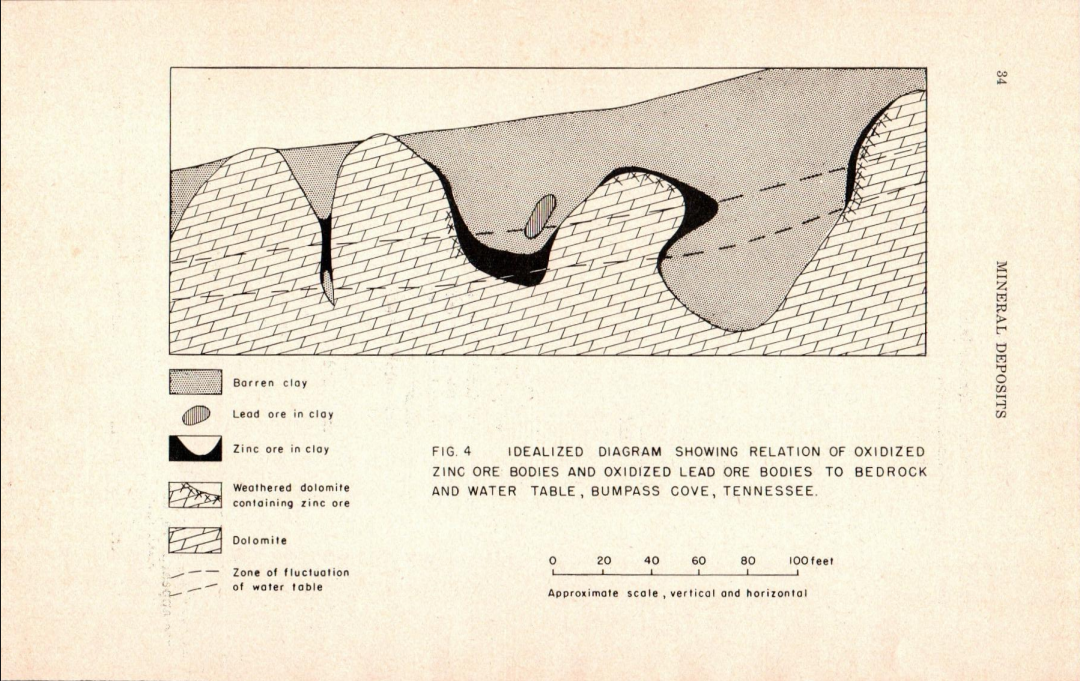
Orientation of ore deposits in the cove

Bumpus Cove is located within a syncline valley underlain by the Shady Dolomite, a geologic formation in the Appalachian Mountains. This dolomite is the source of the minerals that were mined from the cove, and most of it was in the form of zinc, manganese, iron, and lead oxides in the residual clay formed from the weathering of this dolomite. Some amount was extracted from the sulfides that react to form the oxides.

Mining in the cove began in the Pre-Columbian era, when local Cherokee people used the easily available clay ores as pigments. The known mineral production of the cove between the 1770s and 1946 was 493,318 long tons of iron concentrates, 213,286 short tons of zinc concentrates, 29,652 short tons of lead concentrates, and 29,162 long tons of manganese concentrates. Some mining was undertaken until the 1960s.

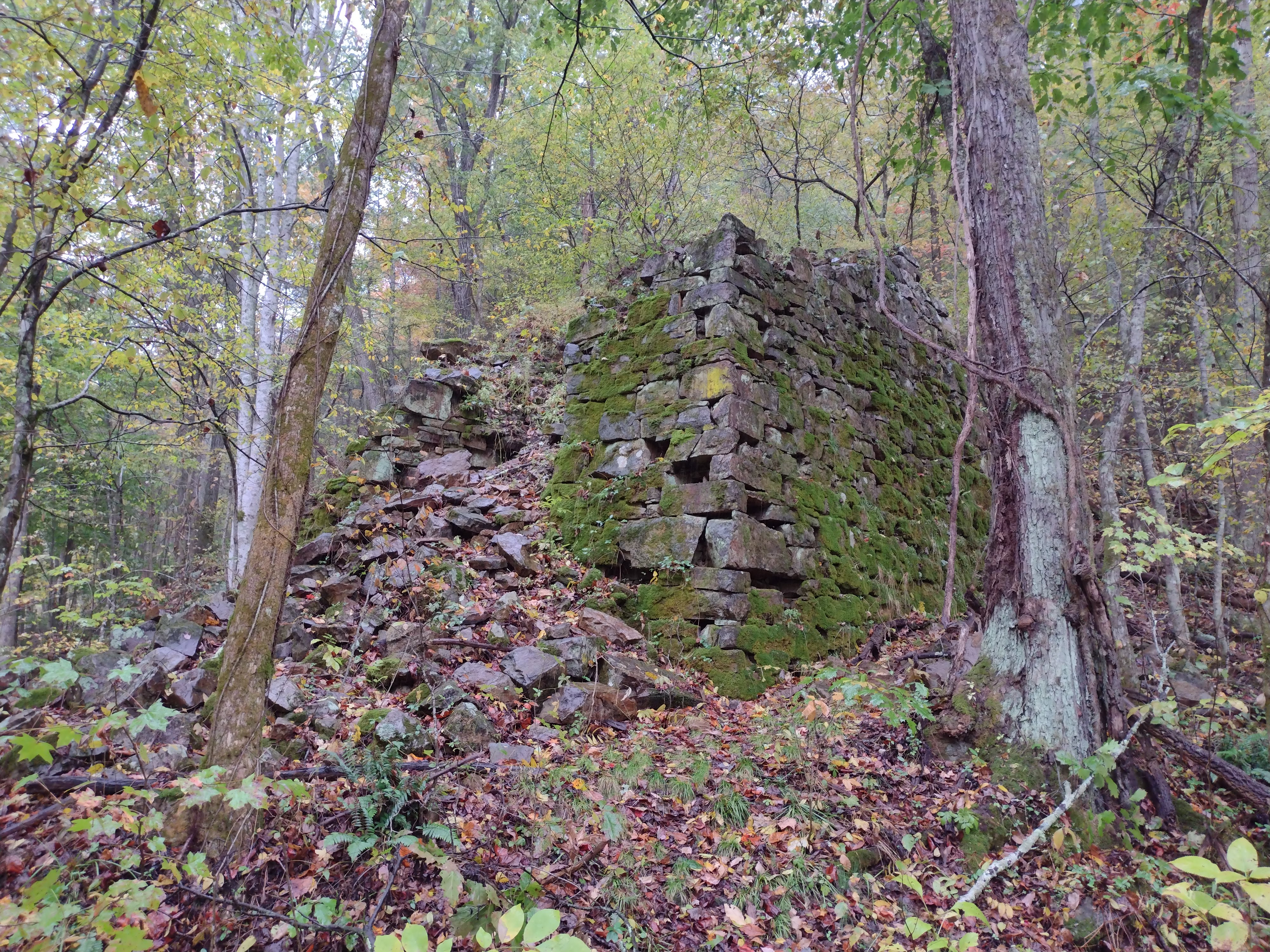
Clarksville Iron Furnace, built to smelt ore mined in Bumpass Cove

The first known large scale mining was for lead, under William Coyler, who operated Coyler's Mine from sometime in the 1770s until 1791. In 1791 he sold the property to Louis Newhouse and Andrew Leuthold, who in turn sold this and adjacent property to John Sevier Jr., the son of John Sevier. Eventually, much of the area became known as Embreeville after Elijah and Elihu Embree bought up much of the area in the early 1800s. After they died, the Blair family operated the mines and adjacent ironworks as the "Pleasant Valley Iron Works".

During the American Civil War, the cove served as a critical source of iron for cannons and other infrastructure for the Confederate States of America. Under the ownership of Duff Green, the ironworks were renamed again during this time period, to the "Confederate Iron Works". Under this name, munitions that supplied General Bragg's and General Longstreet's campaigns were produced. This was considered so important that men could enlist to work at the cove instead of serving in a traditional military role.

In the post-Confederacy period, the mines reverted to the Blair family, who held it until 1890 or 1889, when they sold it to a group of British investors. However, monetary difficulties, caused in part by the Panic of 1893, delayed the disrupted plans to build a town, and forced the furnace to shut down. Mining stayed dormant until 1903, but soon shut down once more in 1909. This was the period in which hydraulic mining was first employed in the cove by the Embree Iron Company. In 1913, a true revival of activity followed the discovery of large lead and zinc deposits using churn drilling for prospecting. The business was successful in the aftermath of World War I, and eventually started to produce manganese.

The mining in the cove finished in the 1960s, when all economically viable ore deposits had been mined out.

Fowler mine
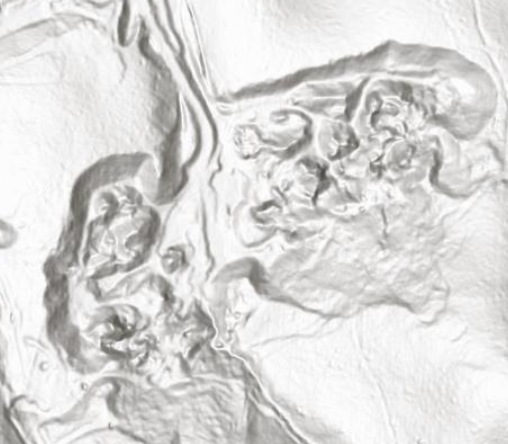
- Lidar imagery of the Fowler zinc mine

- Location near Erwin, Tennessee
- Location: Bumpus Cove,Tennessee; 36°09′08″N 82°29′11″W
- Products: Zinc, Iron, Lead

The Fowler mine is an abandoned zinc, iron, and lead mine on the southeast side of Bumpus Cove near Erwin, Tennessee. It is the largest hydraulic iron mine in the cove, and consists of two hydraulic mining cuts on opposite sides of Fowler Branch, which flows through the middle of the mine. During the 1970s, it was the site of an incinerator and was used to illegally store barrels of hazardous waste.

== Landfill contamination ==
Starting in 1972, a landfill operation was active in the cove within an old manganese mine near the head of the cove. This operation, though initially sanctioned and permitted, became a serious risk to local health after repeated violation of regulations surrounding the disposal of hazardous solid and liquid waste. The landfill was not permitted to operate as a hazardous waste disposal site, but these regulations were routinely violated during the seven year operation of the landfill. At one point, the operator attempted to gain permission to dump approximately 350,000 pounds of contaminated chicken at the site, alongside other industrial hazardous waste. Even though permission was denied, some of the waste was dumped anyway.

In 1974, approval was given for the Fowler zinc mine to be the location of an incinerator. The incinerator only operated within compliance for a very short time period, if at all, and was closed in 1976. Local residents contended that the site of the incinerator was used to store liquid waste, which was not permitted.

By 1975, residents were already raising concerns about the contamination arising from the landfill, and the Tennessee Department of Health conducted a preliminary investigation, which found several barrels of improperly disposed of waste. The Kingsport Times-News also published accusations made by former landfill employees that up to 10,000 barrels where illegally buried around this time. In 1977, there was a strike of the landfill employees, as well as a serious fire. The landfill was closed in 1979, largely as a response to local pressure.

In 1980, Skip Foss, the president of the Bumpass Cove Citizens Group, testified before Congress. He stated that as much as 60,000 gallons of tridichlorobenzene had been dumped at the site, and that some of it had been sprayed on roads to keep dust down, similar to the source of dioxin contamination in Times Beach, Missouri. This testimony was part of the hearings that eventually led to the passing of the Comprehensive Environmental Response, Compensation, and Liability Act of 1980 (CERCLA), which established the federal Superfund program. This same year, the owner of the property the landfill was located on offered it to the state.

After five years of management by the state, the U.S. Environmental Protection Agency (EPA) designated the former landfill as a Superfund site in 1984, which began a process of notification, evaluation, environmental remediation, and maintenance. In 1992, residents were advised to use bottled water instead of groundwater. Eventually, access to the Jonesboro municipal water supply was secured. A cap over the hazardous waste was installed in 1999, and semi-annual monitoring of groundwater contamination began. The EPA did not list Bumpass Cove on its National Priorities List in 2002. The site is scheduled for re-evaluation in 2029 to determine if monitoring needs to continue.

A $20 million class action lawsuit, Walls v. Waste Resource Corp., was filed by the residents of the cove. The suit was leveled against the owners of both the property the landfill was built on, and the operators themselves. 112 persons signed on. This was eventually settled, and, according to an interview of Skip Foss conducted by Robert Marsh, succeeding in identifying responsible parties, which he considered key in assigning clean-up costs and securing long term access to clean water. Some monetary damages were agreed to in the settlement as well.

Stories about resident opposition to the landfill were told in the 1985 documentary You Got to Move. The section about Bumpus Cove, "I'm Standing With You Neighbor", is available to watch online.

== Hurricane Helene ==
The area suffered extensive damage as a result of the passage of Hurricane Helene in September 2024. The area was devastated, with many residents losing homes and land to the shifting Nolichucky River. The Federal Emergency Management Agency (FEMA) provided some funding for the replacement of property, but not land removed by the river. At Bumpus Cove, the river shifted dramatically, and land that was once away from the river is now within the channel or on the embankment. Some money to help fund recovery of land was donated by a local nonprofit.

== Land forms ==
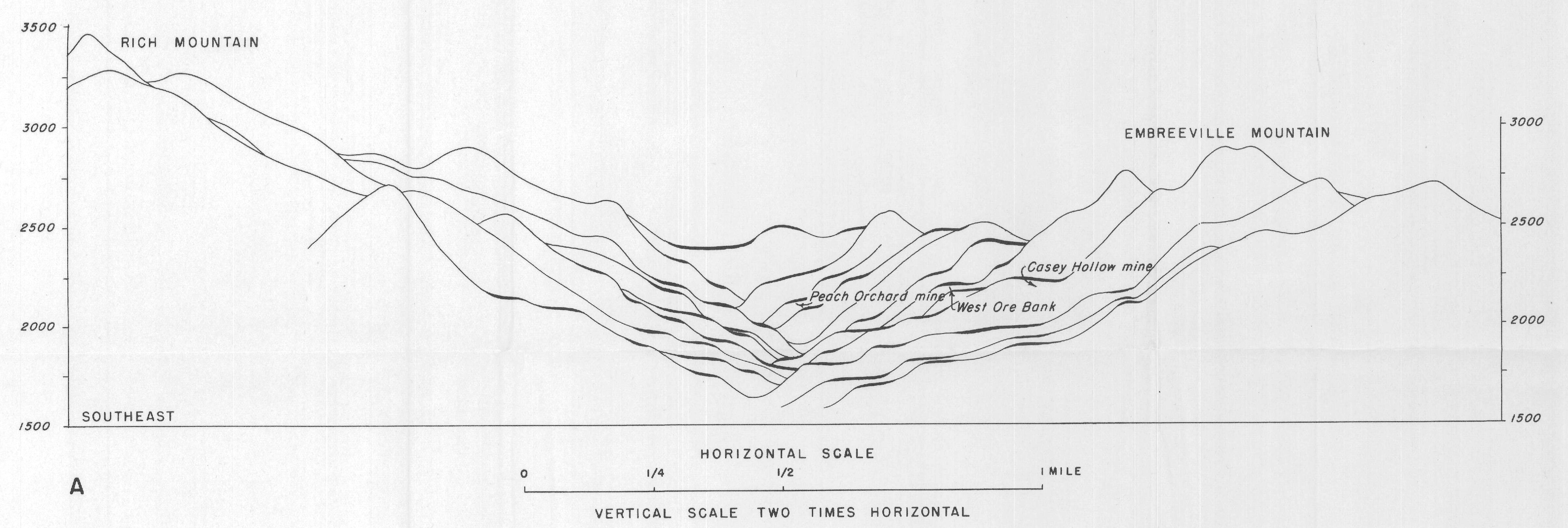
Profile of Bumpass Cove, U.S. Geological Survey (1944)

== See also ==
- Environmental issues in Appalachia
- Landfills in the United States
- Landfill leachate
