= Davy Crockett Lake (Greene County, Tennessee) =

- Location within Tennessee Location within the United States
- Location: Greene County, Tennessee
- Coordinates: 36°03′56″N 82°52′01″W
- Type: reservoir
- Primary inflows: Nolichucky River
- Primary outflows: Nolichucky River
- Basin countries: United States
- Surface area: 383 acres (155 ha)
- Surface elevation: 1,243 ft (379 m)

Davy Crockett Lake is a 383-acre (154.99 ha; 0.60 sq mi) body of water impounded by Nolichucky Dam on the Nolichucky River, 7 miles (11 km) south of Greeneville in Greene County in the U.S. state of Tennessee. It is also known as the Davy Crockett Reservoir and is maintained by the Tennessee Valley Authority (TVA). It is a recreation site home to a variety of game fish.

== Recreation ==
A park owned by Greene County, called Kinser Park is located on the north shore of the lake. A small TVA recreation area is located below the dam.
