= Stewart Hill, Tennessee =

- Unincorporated community
- Location within Tennessee Location within the United States
- Coordinates: 36°18′28″N 82°30′29″W
- Country: United States
- State: Tennessee
- County: Washington
- Elevation: 1,791 ft (546 m)
- Time zone: UTC-5 (Eastern (EST))
  - Summer (DST): UTC-4 (EDT)
- Area code: 423
- GNIS feature ID: 1314337

Stewart Hill is an unincorporated community in Washington County, Tennessee, United States.
