= Chester Inn =

Former inn in Jonesborough, Tennessee, US

Coordinates: 36.294344°N 82.473064°W

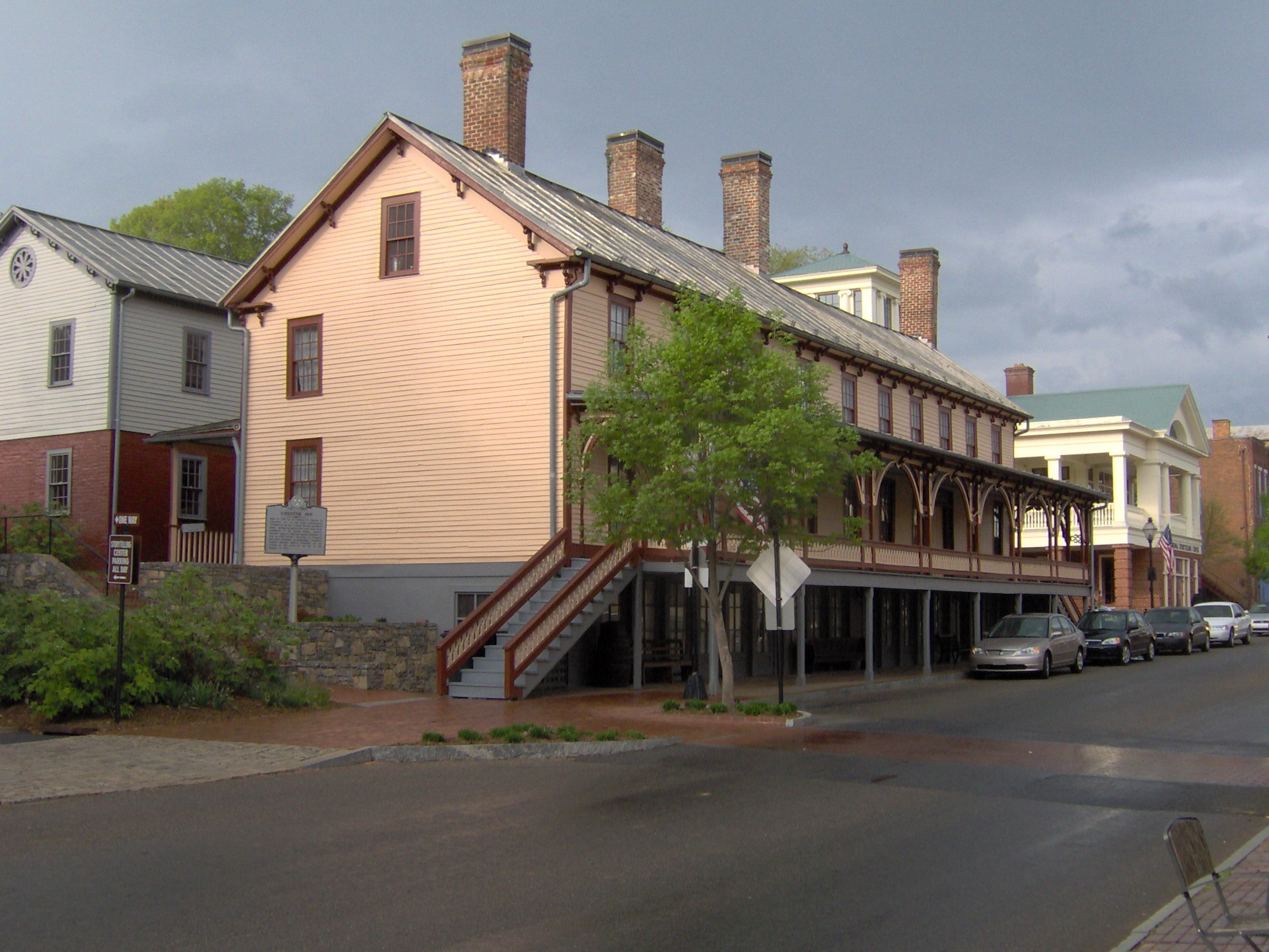
Chester Inn

The Chester Inn State Historic Site is a former inn on the Great Stage Road at 116 West Main Street in Jonesborough, Tennessee. It was opened in 1797 by Dr. William P. Chester. It was the best hotel in the Tennessee frontier area.

Owned by the State of Tennessee, and located in downtown Jonesborough, it is operated by the Heritage Alliance of Northeast Tennessee and Southwest Virginia, under an agreement with the Tennessee Historical Commission. Visitors can view the restored upstairs, including the late 19th-century period upstairs parlor and dining room, and a former inn room. In the basement level, an exhibit was opened in 2011 to showcase local history.
