= Bald Mountains =

Mountain range in Tennessee and North Carolina, United States

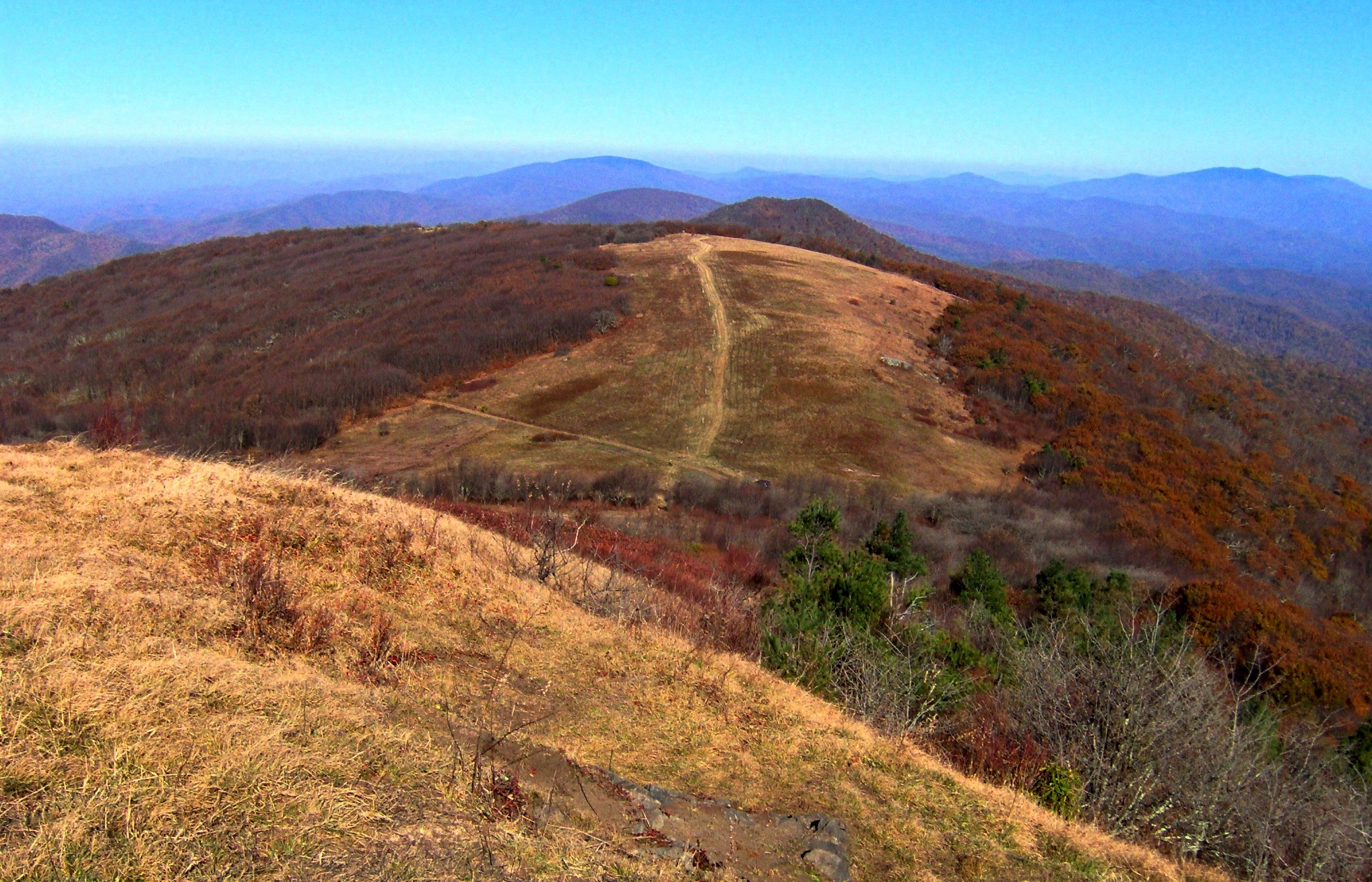
- The view northwest from the summit of Big Bald

Highest point
- Peak: Big Bald
- Elevation: 5,516 ft (1,681 m)
- Coordinates: 35°59′23″N 82°29′25″W

Geography
- Country: United States
- States: North Carolina and Tennessee
- Parent range: Blue Ridge Mountains
- Borders on: Unaka Mountains and Great Smoky Mountains

The Bald Mountains are a mountain range rising along the border between Tennessee and North Carolina in the southeastern United States. They are part of the Blue Ridge Mountain Province of the Southern Appalachian Mountains. The Bald Mountains stretch from the Pigeon River in the south to the Nolichucky River in the north, and comprise parts of Cocke County, Greene County, and Unicoi County in Tennessee and parts of Madison County and Yancey County in North Carolina. The Great Smoky Mountains border the range to the south, and the Unakas rise opposite the Nolichucky to the north. The range gets its name from the relatively frequent occurrence of grassy balds atop the more prominent summits.

The Cherokee National Forest and the Pisgah National Forest protect substantial sections of the Bald Mountains. The Appalachian Trail traverses the crest of the range. Populated areas within the range include Erwin and Del Rio in Tennessee and Hot Springs in North Carolina. The highest summit in the Bald Mountains is Big Bald, which rises to an elevation of 5,516 feet (1,681 m).

== See also ==
- Max Patch
