= Lamar, Tennessee =

Unincorporated community in Tennessee, US

Coordinates: 36.21622°N 82.47014°W

Lamar is an unincorporated community in southern Washington County, Tennessee.

It is located along Tennessee State Routes 67, 81 and 107 south of Jonesborough, northwest of Erwin and southwest of Johnson City.
