= Big Bald =

Mountain in Tennessee and North Carolina, United States

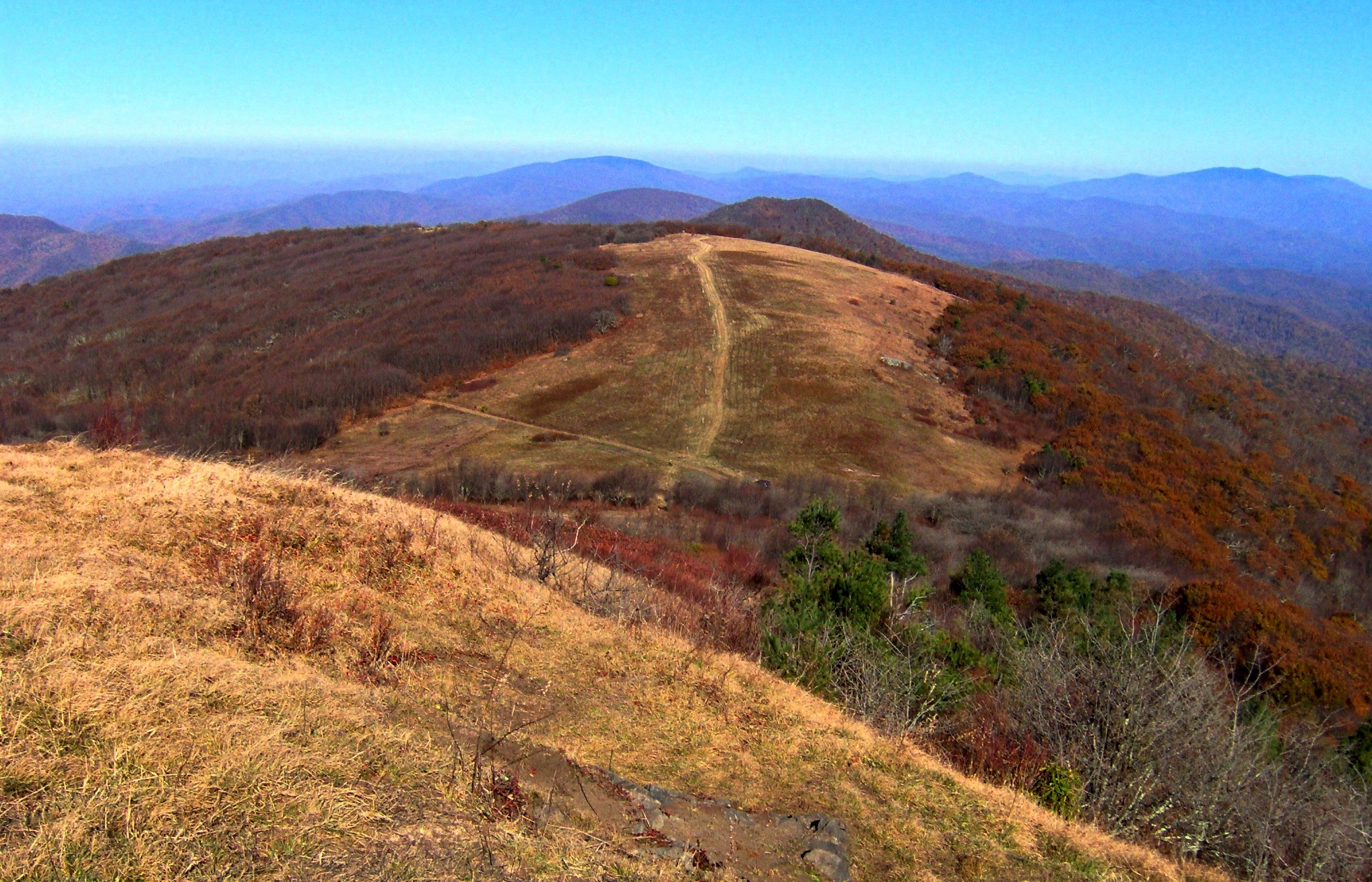
- Summit of Big Bald looking northwest

Highest point
- Elevation: 5,517 ft (1,682 m)
- Prominence: 2,598 ft (792 m)
- Parent peak: Blackstock Knob, North Carolina
- Listing: Unicoi County high point
- Coordinates: 35°59′23.20″N 82°29′25.05″W

Geography
- Location within North Carolina
- Location: Yancey County, North Carolina, United States; Unicoi County, Tennessee, United States
- Parent range: Bald Mountains

Big Bald is a mountain on the border of Yancey County, North Carolina and Unicoi County, Tennessee. Located along the Appalachian Trail at an elevation of 5,516 feet (1,681 m), it is the highest peak in the Bald Mountains, which are part of the larger Blue Ridge Mountains subrange of the Appalachian Mountains.

== Description ==
Big Bald is an Appalachian bald, covered by thick vegetation. It is located near the border between Unicoi County, Tennessee and Yancey County, North Carolina, and is the highest point of the former. The mountain has a 360-degree view from its summit.
