= February, Tennessee =

Unincorporated community in Tennessee, US

Coordinates: 36°20′00″N 82°29′59″W

February is an unincorporated community in Washington County, Tennessee.

== History ==
A post office called February was established in 1884, and remained in operation until 1899. One Mr. February, a local postal official, gave the community his last name.
