= Nolichucky River =

River in the Eastern United States

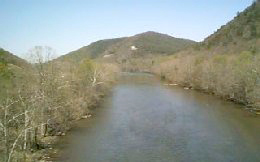
- The Nolichucky River at Embreeville, Tennessee

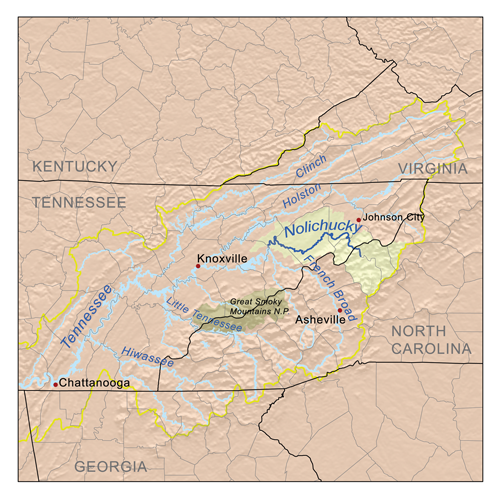
- Nolichucky watershed

Location
- Country: United States
- State: North Carolina, Tennessee

Physical characteristics
- Source: North Toe River
  - location: Avery County, North Carolina
  - coordinates: 35°15′57″N 81°53′13″W
  - elevation: 4,350 ft (1,330 m)
- 2nd source: Cane River
  - location: Yancey County, North Carolina
  - coordinates: 35°45′55″N 82°18′33″W
  - elevation: 3,553 ft (1,083 m)
- Source confluence
  - location: Yancey County, North Carolina
  - coordinates: 36°01′44″N 82°19′37″W
  - elevation: 2,021 ft (616 m)
- Mouth: French Broad River
  - location: Cocke County/Hamblen County line, Tennessee
  - coordinates: 36°04′55″N 83°13′45″W
  - elevation: 1,001 ft (305 m)
- Length: 115 mi (185 km)
- Basin size: 1,744 sq mi (4,520 km^{2})
- Discharge
  - location: Embreeville, Tennessee(mean for water years 1920–2005)
  - average: 1,378 cu ft/s (39.0 m^{3}/s)(mean for water years 1920–2005)
  - minimum: 88 cu ft/s (2.5 m^{3}/s)September 1925
  - maximum: 120,000 cu ft/s (3,400 m^{3}/s)May 1901

Basin features
- Progression: Nolichucky → French Broad → Tennessee → Ohio → Mississippi → Gulf of Mexico

The Nolichucky River is a 115-mile (185 km) river that flows through western North Carolina and East Tennessee in the southeastern United States. Traversing the Pisgah National Forest and the Cherokee National Forest in the Blue Ridge Mountains, the river's watershed includes some of the highest mountains in the Appalachians, including Mount Mitchell in North Carolina, the highest point in the eastern United States. The river is a tributary of the French Broad River and is impounded by Nolichucky Dam near Greeneville, Tennessee.

== Hydrography ==
The Nolichucky River rises as the confluence of the North Toe River and the Cane River near the community of Huntdale, North Carolina. The stream succeeds the North Toe as the boundary between Yancey County and Mitchell County, North Carolina. Trending roughly westward, it flows along the northern base of Flattop Mountain. The gorge is especially steep on its north side. Geologically, the area is predominantly underlain by metamorphic rock of Precambrian age.

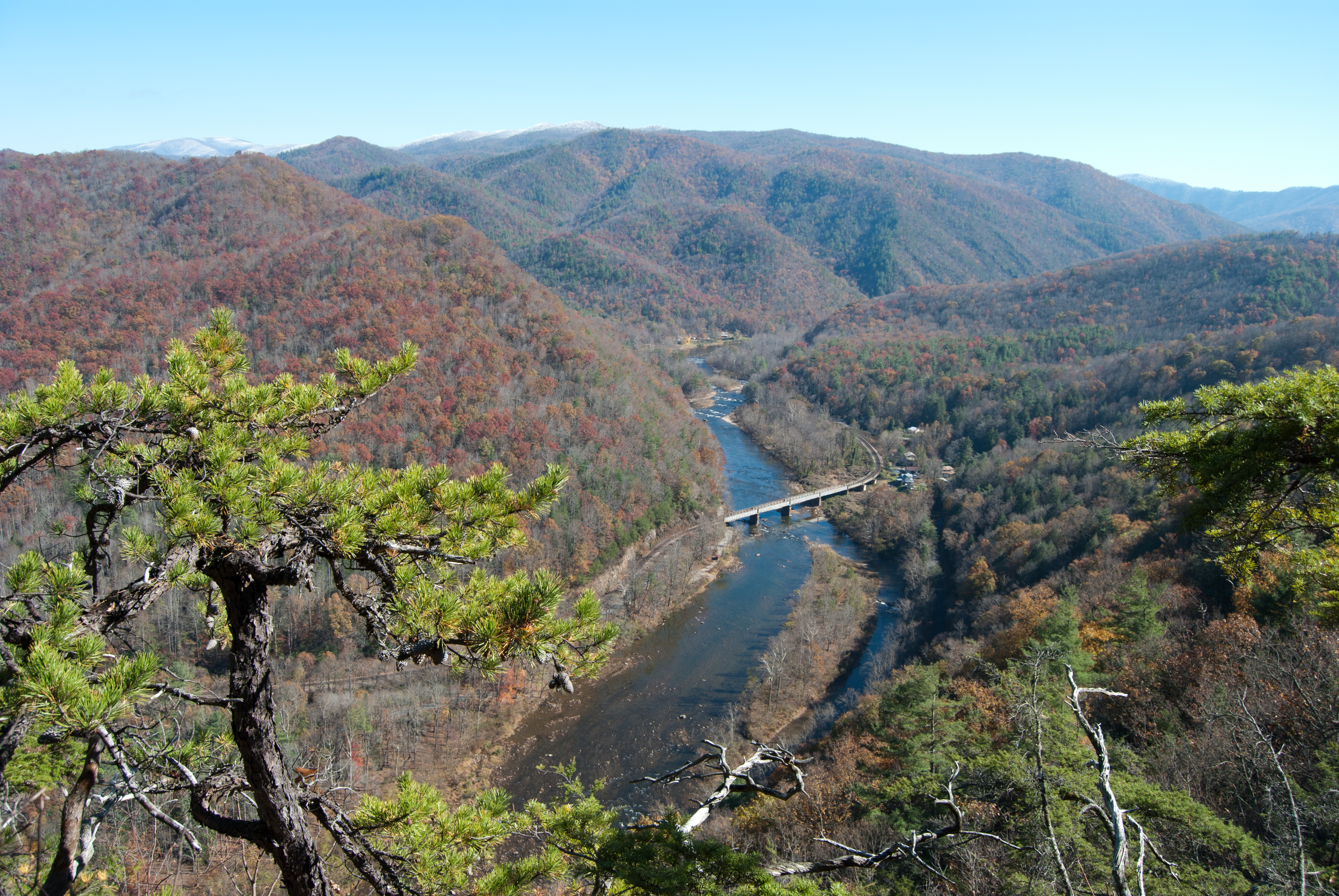
The Nolichucky, approaching Erwin, Tennessee from the east, as seen from the Appalachian Trail just south of Erwin

The river then enters Unicoi County, Tennessee, as it drops through a whitewater gorge, flowing between the ranges of the Bald Mountains (to the south) and the Unaka Mountains (to the north). Turning northwest, the stream is bridged by the Appalachian Trail and by U.S. Highway 19W southwest of Erwin, Tennessee. Near Erwin, two tributary streams, South Indian Creek and North Indian Creek, join the Nolichucky River. Turning more to the north, the stream is paralleled for several miles by State Route 81, (which is also concurrent with Tennessee State Route 107 for several miles) crossing into Washington County. The river cuts between several mountains at this point, including Rich Mountain to the south and Buffalo Mountain to the north.

Shortly after entering Washington County, the river makes a horseshoe bend near Embreeville, where it is bridged by SR 81 and SR 107 for the first time. At the northeastern end of Embreeville Mountain, the stream emerges from a large gap and turning west-southwest is bridged by SR 81 again. Here it exits the Blue Ridge Mountains and enters the Ridge and Valley province, which is underlain primarily by sedimentary rock of the Lower Paleozoic Era. The river then continues west-southwest for several miles, paralleled by SR 107. The river leaves the roadside near Mt. Carmel. From there it flows northwest over a winding course to David Crockett Birthplace State Park near the Washington County–Greene County line. Many tributary creeks join the river in Washington and Greene counties. At the county line, one of the larger tributaries, Big Limestone Creek, joins the river. State Route 351 crosses the river west of Crockett's birthplace.

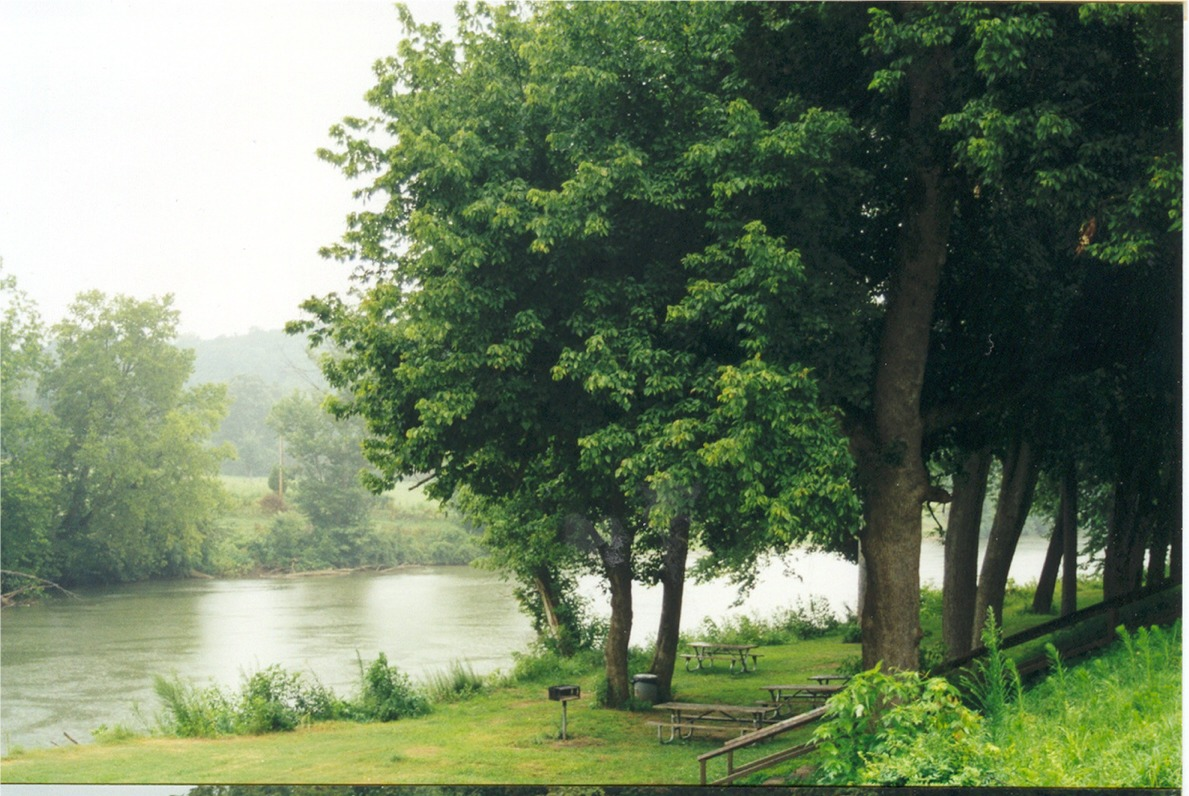
The Nolichucky at Davy Crockett Birthplace State Park

The river then flows southwestward, following the trends of the Ridge and Valley province's underlying geology. Bridged by SR 107 again just east of Tusculum, the stream continues southwestward, later bridged by State Route 350 just above an impoundment caused by Nolichucky Dam.

This dam was constructed as a hydroelectric project by the former Tennessee Electric Power Company in 1912. The dam was sold to the Tennessee Valley Authority (TVA) in 1939, when the agency was established by the Franklin D. Roosevelt administration during the Great Depression. The TVA continued to operate the dam for electrical power purposes until the 1970s. The degree of siltation of the reservoir, called Davy Crockett Lake, had made continued efforts to operate the facility for hydroelectric purposes impracticable. The agency retired the dam as a power source but continues to maintain it and to use it for flood control and recreational purposes. Just west of the dam, the river crosses State Route 70 and SR 107 for a third and final time.

Continuing almost due west, the river is bridged by U.S. Highway 321. Just before reaching the Greene County–Cocke County line, the river is bridged by State Route 340. Just past this point, the river becomes the border between the counties. A few miles below this point it is bridged by Knob Creek Road. South of Interstate 81, Greene, Cocke, and Hamblen counties come to a point at a bend in river, where Lick Creek joins the river. From this point on, the meandering stream forms the Hamblen County–Cocke County line.

The confluence of the Nolichucky with the French Broad River occurs in the upstream portion of the Douglas Lake impoundment, caused by Douglas Dam, a World War II-era TVA project located downstream along the French Broad. The mouth of the Nolichucky lies near the point where Hamblen, Cocke, and Jefferson counties meet. Near the mouth is the Rankin Wildlife Management Area, a reserve operated by the Tennessee Wildlife Resources Agency.

== History ==
While the origins of the name-place have long been debated and remain unclear, it is believed to be derived from the name of the Cherokee village Na’na-tlu gun’yi, or "Spruce-Tree Place," that once stood near modern Jonesborough, Tennessee. Some claim that according to local lore, it means "Rushing Water(s)", "Dangerous Water(s)", or "Black Swirling Water".

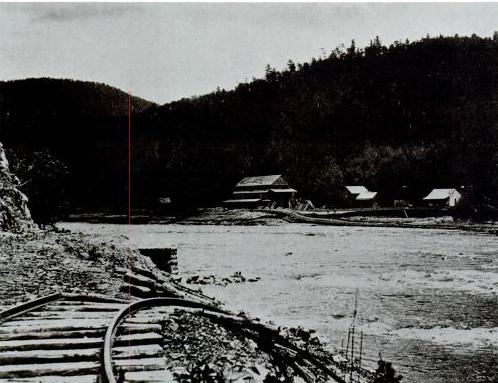
Remnants of a railroad bridge near Erwin destroyed by the flood of May 1901; the flood was the river's largest on record until Hurricane Helene in 2024.

During the 1770s, European frontiersmen established the "Nolichucky settlements" along the river in modern Greene County, in what was then part of Cherokee territory. These settlements were aligned with the Watauga settlements in what is now Elizabethton. As hostilities intensified in the mid-1770s between the settlers and a faction of the Cherokee, known as the "Chickamaugas," who were opposed to the settlements, John Sevier, at the time a young militia officer, began overseeing the construction of Fort Lee. After an invasion was launched by Chickamauga leader Dragging Canoe in July 1776, Sevier abandoned the unfinished fort and fled to the Watauga settlements. Sevier would later acquire the nickname "Nolichucky Jack" or "Chucky Jack" for his exploits along the river and in its vicinity.

Famed frontiersman Davy Crockett was born along the river near Limestone, Tennessee, in 1786. The site is now the focus of David Crockett Birthplace State Park.

The turn of the century brought trains hauling passengers (until 1955) and mostly coal on the Clinchfield Railroad (now operated by CSX), which still runs alongside the river through the gorge with bridged crossings at Unaka Springs (Erwin) and Poplar, North Carolina. At least one sunken railcar sits at the bottom of the river near the entrance to the Lost Cove Settlement, a civil-war era ghost town just upriver (and uphill) from the once-disputed Tennessee-North Carolina border.

== Whitewater rafting ==
Between Poplar, North Carolina, and Unaka Springs, Tennessee, the Nolichucky River Gorge provides one of the more scenic and technical whitewater trips in the Southern United States, due in large part to its constant (and often rapid) fluctuations. The naturally flowing Nolichucky River is a popular whitewater rafting and canoeing destination having stretches of both whitewater areas and calm water. Rainfall upstream around Mount Mitchell makes the upper section rapids ever more impressive with significant rain causing extremely big water and un-runnable routes in otherwise ordinary areas.

"Frank Gentry describes such a trip through the gorge with Bob Lawson on a rubber raft. Frank says, 'I just went along for the ride and a look at the scenery. Man-a-live, I didn't have time to look at anything! When that raft hit those rapids at "Rooster Tail" we were going round and round, dived into "Souse Hole", slammed into rocks here and more rocks there. Seemed like the harder you paddled the more rocks you'd hit. You'd just whirl and twirl and wham into more big boulders you hadn't even seen. Sometimes that white-faced water would stand straight up and slam you smack-kadab all over the raft, or out of it. Man, that was a wild trip!"

Inversely, a lack of adequate rainfall throughout the summer considerably increases the difficulty of navigating the pre-existing aspects of the rapids, which already tend towards being both technically difficult and challenging for rafters. These dry conditions and concomitant low water levels reveal a vast diversity of features. These hazards are ordinarily submerged during summers with normal seasonal rainfall patterns. Seasonal droughts can make rafting trips inadvisable or impassable, prompting local rafting companies in Unicoi County to sometimes divert whitewater river trips to the Watauga River running through Elizabethton, Tennessee in Carter County. The TVA regulates flow of the Watauga River and guarantees a minimum release schedule accommodating whitewater rafting companies during the summer season with the regular release of deep, impounded reservoir waters from behind both the Watauga Dam and the Wilbur Dam.

== See also ==
- Conway Bridge, one of its crossings
- List of North Carolina rivers
- List of Tennessee rivers
