= Embreeville, Tennessee =

Embreeville
- CDP
- Location within Tennessee Location within the United States
- Coordinates: 36°10′52″N 82°27′31″W
- Country: United States
- State: Tennessee
- Counties: Washington

Area
  - Total: 1.43 sq mi (3.70 km^{2})
  - Land: 1.34 sq mi (3.48 km^{2})
  - Water: 0.085 sq mi (0.22 km^{2})
- Elevation: 1,598 ft (487 m)

Population (2020)
  - Total: 429
  - Density: 319.3/sq mi (123.27/km^{2})
- Time zone: UTC-5 (Eastern (EST))
  - Summer (DST): UTC-4 (EDT)
- ZIP code: 37650
- Area code: 423
- GNIS feature ID: 47-23880

Embreeville is an unincorporated community and census-designated place in southern Washington County, Tennessee. It is located along the Nolichucky River and on State Routes 81 and 107.

The population of the CDP was 429 at the 2020 census.

== History ==
Embreeville was once a mining community which worked the nearby Bumpus Cove. The area was severely impacted by Hurricane Helene.

== Education ==
It is in the Washington County School District.
