= Bowmantown, Tennessee =

Unincorporated community in Tennessee, US

Coordinates: 36°17′53″N 82°34′33″W

Bowmantown is an unincorporated community in Washington County, Tennessee.
