= Austin Springs, Washington County, Tennessee =

Unincorporated community in the US

Coordinates: 36°22′59″N 82°20′58″W

Austin Springs is an unincorporated community in Washington County, Tennessee. Austin Springs is located northwest of Johnson City.

== History ==
A post office called Austin's Springs was established in 1875, and remained in operation until it was discontinued in 1900. The community was named for one or both of the Austin brothers who started a hotel at the site of a mineral spa.
