= South Central, Tennessee =

Unincorporated community in Tennessee, US

South Central (also known as Mount Carmel) is an unincorporated community in southwestern Washington County, Tennessee.
