= National Register of Historic Places listings in Greene County, Tennessee =

Location of Greene County in Tennessee

This is a list of the National Register of Historic Places listings in Greene County, Tennessee.

This is intended to be a complete list of the properties and districts on the National Register of Historic Places in Greene County, Tennessee, United States. Latitude and longitude coordinates are provided for many National Register properties and districts; these locations may be seen together in a map.

There are 17 properties and districts listed on the National Register in the county. Three other sites once listed on the Register have been removed.

Contents: Counties in Tennessee
Anderson – Bedford – Benton – Bledsoe – Blount – Bradley – Campbell – Cannon – Carroll – Carter – Cheatham – Chester – Claiborne – Clay – Cocke – Coffee – Crockett – Cumberland – Davidson – Decatur – DeKalb – Dickson – Dyer – Fayette – Fentress – Franklin – Gibson – Giles – Grainger – Greene – Grundy – Hamblen – Hamilton – Hancock – Hardeman – Hardin – Hawkins – Haywood – Henderson – Henry – Hickman – Houston – Humphreys – Jackson – Jefferson – Johnson – Knox – Lake – Lauderdale – Lawrence – Lewis – Lincoln – Loudon – Macon – Madison – Marion – Marshall – Maury – McMinn – McNairy – Meigs – Monroe – Montgomery – Moore – Morgan – Obion – Overton – Perry – Pickett – Polk – Putnam – Rhea – Roane – Robertson – Rutherford – Scott – Sequatchie – Sevier – Shelby – Smith – Stewart – Sullivan – Sumner – Tipton – Trousdale – Unicoi – Union – Van Buren – Warren – Washington – Wayne – Weakley – White – Williamson – Wilson

This National Park Service list is complete through NPS recent listings posted December 12, 2025.

== Current listings ==
	Name on the Register	Image	Date listed	Location	City or town	Description
1	Allen-Birdwell Farm	Allen-Birdwell Farm	March 15, 2011 (#11000088)	3005 W. Allen's Bridge Rd. 36°03′34″N 82°54′43″W	Greeneville	Transformation of the Nolichucky Valley MPS
2	Andrew Johnson National Historic Site	Andrew Johnson National Historic Site	October 15, 1966 (#66000073)	Main, Depot and College Sts. 36°09′30″N 82°50′06″W	Greeneville	
3	Blue Springs Lutheran Church and Cemetery	Blue Springs Lutheran Church and Cemetery	November 13, 2017 (#100001824)	920 Main St. 36°11′24″N 82°57′28″W	Mosheim	
4	Brown-Neas House	Brown-Neas House	November 8, 1984 (#84000374)	Old Johnson City Rd. 36°11′02″N 82°44′04″W	Afton	Built c. 1868 by local farmer John Brown; Inventory form.
5	Bulls Gap Fortification		September 29, 1998 (#98001211)	Address Restricted	Bulls Gap	
6	Crescent School	Crescent School	March 16, 2020 (#100005134)	615 West Main St. 36°09′29″N 82°50′24″W	Greeneville	
7	Samuel Doak House	Samuel Doak House	February 18, 1975 (#75001755)	Erwin Highway, Greeneville, TN 37745; 36°10′28″N 82°45′54″W	Tusculum	Built by Samuel W. Doak, son of pioneer minister Samuel Doak; now a museum.
8	Earnest Farms Historic District	Earnest Farms Historic District	January 11, 2002 (#01001449)	South of the Nolichucky River, bounded by Crum Farm and Jim Earnest Farmstead; 36°11′54″N 82°40′51″W	Chuckey	
9	Greeneville Historic District	Greeneville Historic District	May 3, 1974 (#74001913)	Roughly bounded by Irish, Nelson, E. Church, College and McKee Sts. 36°09′41″N 82°49′47″W	Greeneville	
10	James Lowry House		March 25, 1982 (#82003972)	Asheville Highway; 36°07′16″N 82°51′39″W	Greeneville	
11	Maden Hall Farm	Maden Hall Farm	August 27, 2009 (#09000667)	3225 Kingsport Highway; 36°13′02″N 82°47′40″W	Greeneville	
12	Mauris-Earnest Fort House	Mauris-Earnest Fort House	January 30, 1978 (#78002591)	South of Chuckey on the Nolichucky River; 36°12′19″N 82°41′04″W	Chuckey	
13	New Bethel Cumberland Presbyterian Church	New Bethel Cumberland Presbyterian Church	October 5, 1978 (#78002592)	Northwest of Greeneville on State Route 70; 36°11′43″N 82°53′01″W	Greeneville	Inventory form
14	Rainbow Bridge		January 14, 2026 (#100012553)	Northeast of 3230 107 Cutoff Road; 36°07′08″N 82°45′25″W	Greeneville vicinity	
15	David Rankin House	David Rankin House	August 26, 1983 (#83003035)	Snapp's Ferry Rd. 36°12′30″N 82°46′12″W	Greeneville	
16	Ripley Stone House	Ripley Stone House	September 18, 1978 (#78002590)	East of Afton off U.S. Route 11E; 36°11′53″N 82°42′31″W	Afton	
17	Tusculum College Historic District	Tusculum College Historic District	November 25, 1980 (#80003800)	Erwin Highway, Giland St. and Shiloh Rd. 36°10′25″N 82°45′41″W	Tusculum	

== Former listings ==
	Name on the Register	Image	Date listed	Date removed	Location	City or town	Description
1	Chuckey Depot	Chuckey Depot	December 19, 1979 (#79002432)	December 15, 2011	State Route 351; 36°17′29″N 82°28′37″W	Chuckey	Removed due to relocation to Jonesborough.
2	Conway Bridge	Conway Bridge	November 20, 2009 (#09000948)	March 17, 2025	Briar Thicket Rd./Knob Creek Rd. over the Nolichucky River; 36°07′21″N 83°07′31″W	Briar Thicket	Extends into Cocke County; Bridge was destroyed by flooding in September 2024.
3	Wayside		March 22, 1984 (#84003543)	November 9, 2007	East of Greeneville off of US 11E	Greeneville	

== See also ==
- List of National Historic Landmarks in Tennessee
- National Register of Historic Places listings in Tennessee
