= National Register of Historic Places listings in Cocke County, Tennessee =

Location of Cocke County in Tennessee

This is a list of the National Register of Historic Places listings in Cocke County, Tennessee.

This is intended to be a complete list of the properties and districts on the National Register of Historic Places in Cocke County, Tennessee, United States. Latitude and longitude coordinates are provided for many National Register properties and districts; these locations may be seen together in a map.

There are 14 properties and districts listed on the National Register in the county, and three former listings.

Contents: Counties in Tennessee
Anderson – Bedford – Benton – Bledsoe – Blount – Bradley – Campbell – Cannon – Carroll – Carter – Cheatham – Chester – Claiborne – Clay – Cocke – Coffee – Crockett – Cumberland – Davidson – Decatur – DeKalb – Dickson – Dyer – Fayette – Fentress – Franklin – Gibson – Giles – Grainger – Greene – Grundy – Hamblen – Hamilton – Hancock – Hardeman – Hardin – Hawkins – Haywood – Henderson – Henry – Hickman – Houston – Humphreys – Jackson – Jefferson – Johnson – Knox – Lake – Lauderdale – Lawrence – Lewis – Lincoln – Loudon – Macon – Madison – Marion – Marshall – Maury – McMinn – McNairy – Meigs – Monroe – Montgomery – Moore – Morgan – Obion – Overton – Perry – Pickett – Polk – Putnam – Rhea – Roane – Robertson – Rutherford – Scott – Sequatchie – Sevier – Shelby – Smith – Stewart – Sullivan – Sumner – Tipton – Trousdale – Unicoi – Union – Van Buren – Warren – Washington – Wayne – Weakley – White – Williamson – Wilson

This National Park Service list is complete through NPS recent listings posted March 14, 2025.

== Current listings ==
| | Name on the Register | Image | Date listed | Location | City or town | Description |
|---|---|---|---|---|---|---|
| 1 | Cocke County Courthouse | Cocke County Courthouse | May 4, 1995 (#95000538) | 111 Court Ave. 35°58′00″N 83°11′05″W | Newport | |
| 2 | Cocke County Memorial Building | Cocke County Memorial Building | September 11, 1997 (#97001139) | 103 N. Cosby Highway; 35°58′03″N 83°11′36″W | Newport | |
| 3 | Walter C. Cureton House | Walter C. Cureton House | November 29, 2001 (#01001325) | 202 Lincoln Ave. 35°57′44″N 83°10′44″W | Newport | |
| 4 | Elm Hill | Elm Hill | May 29, 1975 (#75001742) | 206 W. Riverview St. 35°57′56″N 83°11′27″W | Newport | |
| 5 | English Mountain Fire Lookout Tower | | November 20, 2015 (#15000832) | Carson Springs Rd. 35°54′21″N 83°17′46″W | Chestnut Hill | |
| 6 | Laurel Springs Primitive Baptist Church | | April 12, 2021 (#100006382) | 278 Laurel Springs Rd. 35°46′20″N 83°15′30″W | Cosby vicinity | |
| 7 | Leadvale Coaling Station and Cut-off | Leadvale Coaling Station and Cut-off | December 1, 2014 (#14000997) | Rankin Bottoms Wildlife Management Area; 36°04′45″N 83°14′24″W | Newport | Locally known as the "Rankin Coal Tipple"; includes two miles of abandoned Southern Railway lines, together with a bridge abutment and coal tipple |
| 8 | Mount Cammerer Fire Lookout | Mount Cammerer Fire Lookout | June 12, 2019 (#100004091) | Great Smoky Mountains National Park (GRSM) - end of Mount Cammerer; 35°45′49″N 83°09′41″W | Cosby | |
| 9 | Neas Farm | Neas Farm | March 10, 2004 (#04000152) | 3301 Sable Rd. 36°01′56″N 83°00′46″W | Parrottsville | |
| 10 | O'Dell House | O'Dell House | April 1, 1975 (#75001744) | Northeast of Newport on the Greeneville Highway; 35°58′55″N 83°09′46″W | Newport | |
| 11 | Rhea-Mims Hotel | Rhea-Mims Hotel | July 1, 1998 (#98000822) | 335 East Broadway; 35°57′57″N 83°11′01″W | Newport | |
| 12 | Swaggerty Blockhouse | Swaggerty Blockhouse | June 18, 1973 (#73001756) | East of Parrottsville on Old Parrottsville Highway; 36°00′47″N 83°04′17″W | Parrottsville | |
| 13 | Vinson House | | May 29, 1975 (#75001745) | 4.5 miles south of Newport off Hartford Rd. 35°53′21″N 83°11′06″W | Newport | |
| 14 | Yett-Ellison House | | April 16, 1975 (#75001746) | Main St. (Greeneville Highway); 36°00′29″N 83°05′19″W | Parrottsville | |

== Former listings ==
| | Name on the Register | Image | Date listed | Date removed | Location | City or town | Description |
|---|---|---|---|---|---|---|---|
| 1 | Beechwood Hall | | May 29, 1975 (#75001741) | October 28, 2021 | North of Newport on Rankin Rd. 35°59′27″N 83°10′59″W | Newport | Destroyed by fire in January, 2019 |
| 2 | Conway Bridge | Conway Bridge | November 20, 2009 (#09000948) | March 17, 2025 | Briar Thicket Rd./Knob Creek Rd. over the Nolichucky River; 36°07′21″N 83°07′31″W | Briar Thicket | Extends into Greene County; Bridge was destroyed by flooding in September 2024. |
| 3 | Greenlawn | | May 29, 1975 (#75001743) | December 13, 1999 | NW of Newport on Old Rankin Rd. | Newport vicinity | |

== See also ==
- List of National Historic Landmarks in Tennessee
- National Register of Historic Places listings in Tennessee
