= Chuckey-Doak High School =

High school in Afton, Tennessee, U.S.

Location
- 365 Ripley Island Road; Afton, Tennessee; U.S.A.
- Coordinates: 36.1842°N 82.7325°W

Information
- Type: High School
- Established: 1959
- School district: Greene County
- Principal: Steven Broyles
- Teaching staff: 40.73 (FTE)
- Grades: 9–12
- Enrollment: 582 (2023–2024)
- Student to teacher ratio: 14.29
- Color
- Mascot: Black Knight
- Website: cdhs.greenek12.org

Chuckey-Doak High School is located in Tusculum, Tennessee, United States, with an Afton address. It is one of four high schools in the Greene County, Tennessee School System and serves the eastern part of the county, including the city of Tusculum and the communities of Afton, Chuckey and the Greene County portion of Limestone. Chuckey-Doak was thought up in 1957 when Chuckey High School and Doak High School decided that they needed more space. In 1958 the plan was approved it all started. Chuckey-Doak is now the top high school in the Greene County education system. Their marching band has many notable achievements, similar to their football team.

== Feeder schools ==
- Chuckey Elementary
- Doak Elementary
- Chuckey-Doak Middle School
