= Edward C. Huffaker =

American pioneer of manned flight

Edward Chalmers Huffaker
- Born: July 16, 1856; Seclusion Bend, Tennessee, U.S.
- Died: 1937
- Education: Emory and Henry College (1876), University of Virginia (1883)
- Occupations: teacher, engineer, journalist, postmaster
- Known for: Suggesting the Bernoulli Principle may be responsible for curved wings' flight; assistant to Samuel Langley at the Smithsonian Institution; assisting the Wright brothers
- Notable work: The Value of Curved Surfaces in Flight (1893)
- Spouse(s): Cora Lyman Fishburn (1888 – 1888); Carrie Sue Redding (1894 – ????)

Edward C. Huffaker was an American pioneer of manned flight best known for suggesting decades before anyone else that the Bernoulli Principle may allow curved wings to fly. Huffaker's wind-tunnel work has been discussed in histories of early American aeronautics.

In 1889, he performed glider experiments in Chuckey, Tennessee. From 1895 to 1896, he worked for the Smithsonian Institution on aviation modeling by invitation of Octave Chanute. Late in 1896, he returned to Chuckey to test more gliders under the Smithsonian's Samuel Langley's instruction. He left the Smithsonian in 1898 following disagreements with Langley.

Huffaker worked with the Wright brothers but they did not care for his personality or hygiene.

Huffaker patented a flight-stabilization device in 1920.

Huffaker never flew in an airplane.
