= David Crockett Birthplace State Park =

State park in Tennessee, United States

Coordinates: 36.20429°N 82.65607°W

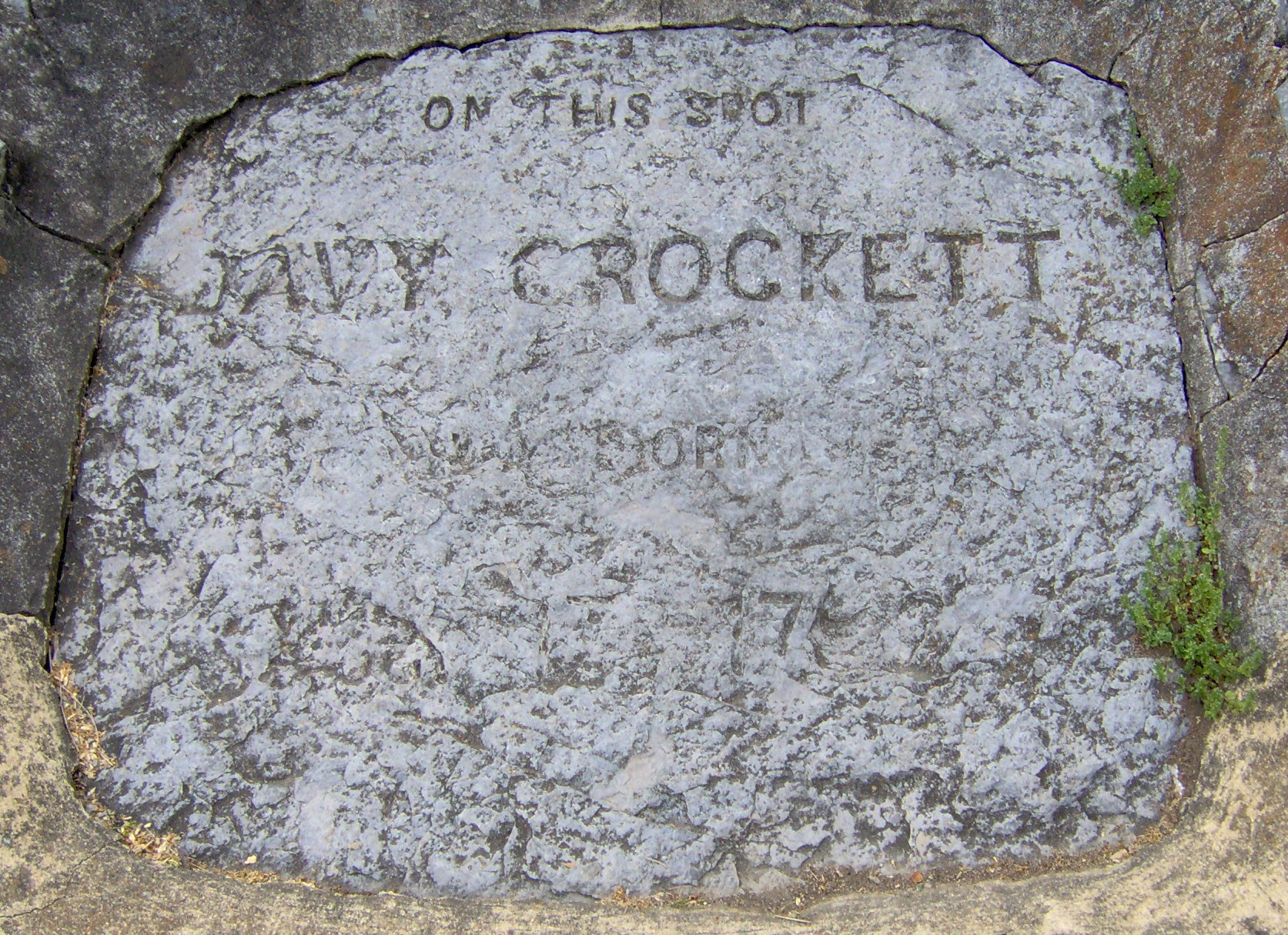
- 19th-century inscription on the footstone of the original Crockett cabin
- Interactive map of David Crockett Birthplace State Park
- Location: Limestone, Greene County, Tennessee
- Area: 105 acres (0.42 km^{2})
- Created: 1973
- Operator: Tennessee Department of Environment and Conservation
- Open: Year Around
- Website: David Crockett Birthplace State Park

David Crockett Birthplace State Park (previously called Davy Crockett Birthplace State Historic Park) is a state park in Greene County, Tennessee, United States. Situated along the Nolichucky River, the park consists of 105 acres (0.42 km^{2}) centered on the traditional birthplace of legendary Tennessee frontiersman, soldier, and politician Davy Crockett (1786-1836). The park includes a replica of Crockett's birth cabin, a museum, and a large campground.

Davy Crockett grew up in the hills and river valleys of East Tennessee, where he gained a reputation for hunting and storytelling. After rising to the rank of colonel in the Lawrence County, Tennessee, militia, Crockett was elected to the Tennessee state legislature in 1821. In 1827, Crockett was elected to the U.S. House of Representatives for the first time. As a congressman, Crockett vehemently opposed many of the policies of President Andrew Jackson, most notably the Indian Removal Act. Crockett's opposition to Jackson's policies led to his defeat in the 1835 elections, prompting his angry departure to Texas shortly thereafter. In early 1836, Crockett joined the Texas Revolution and died at the Battle of the Alamo in March of the same year.

Thanks largely to 19th-century playwrights and 20th-century film makers— who often attributed to Crockett brazen acts of mythical proportion— Crockett grew to become one of the most well-known folk heroes in American history.

== Geographical setting ==
The Nolichucky River flows westward from its source in the Unaka Mountains and slices a scenic valley through the low hills of Washington County, Greene County, and Jefferson County before emptying into the Douglas Lake impoundment of the French Broad River near Newport. Davy Crockett Birthplace State Park is centered on Crockett's traditional birthplace at the junction of the Nolichucky and Big Limestone Creek, which joins the Nolichucky at just over 68 miles (109 km) above the river's mouth. Almost immediately downstream from its Big Limestone Creek confluence, the Nolichucky enters a stretch of rocky shoals just as the northwestward flowing river is bent sharply to the southwest by a series of low, steep hills.

David Crockett Birthplace State Park is located near the modern community of Limestone, approximately 10 miles (16 km) east of Greeneville. Andrew Johnson Highway (U.S. Route 11E/U.S. Route 321), which is well-marked with directional signs and a Tennessee Historical Commission marker, passes just north of the park. The Earnest Farms Historic District is located across the Nolichucky River from the park to the west.

== History ==
Substantial Native American settlements existed at the Nolichucky's Big Limestone Creek confluence as early as the Woodland period (1000 B.C. - 1000 A.D.) and continued sporadically for several centuries. Heavy cultivation in the 19th and 20th centuries destroyed much of the site's prehistoric value, although excavators unearthed numerous projectile points and other cultural material scattered by prehistoric inhabitants.

Euro-American settlers began arriving in the Nolichucky valley after the French and Indian War. In 1771, a merchant named Jacob Brown established the Nolichucky Settlement, which included much of the current park lands. Brown initially leased the land from the Cherokee and purchased it in 1775. The settlement aligned itself with the nearby Watauga Association during the American Revolution and became part of Washington County, North Carolina in 1777. In 1783, the Nolichucky Settlement and several other settlements split off from Washington County to form Greene County. A speculator named George Gillespie purchased the land in 1782, and Gillespie would be the property's owner at the time of Crockett's birth. Samuel Stonecypher purchased the property in 1824, and the Stonecypher family was still in possession of the property when the Davy Crockett Birthplace Association purchased it in the 1950s. The DCBA established the park and transferred ownership to the state of Tennessee in 1973.

=== Crockett's connection to the park ===
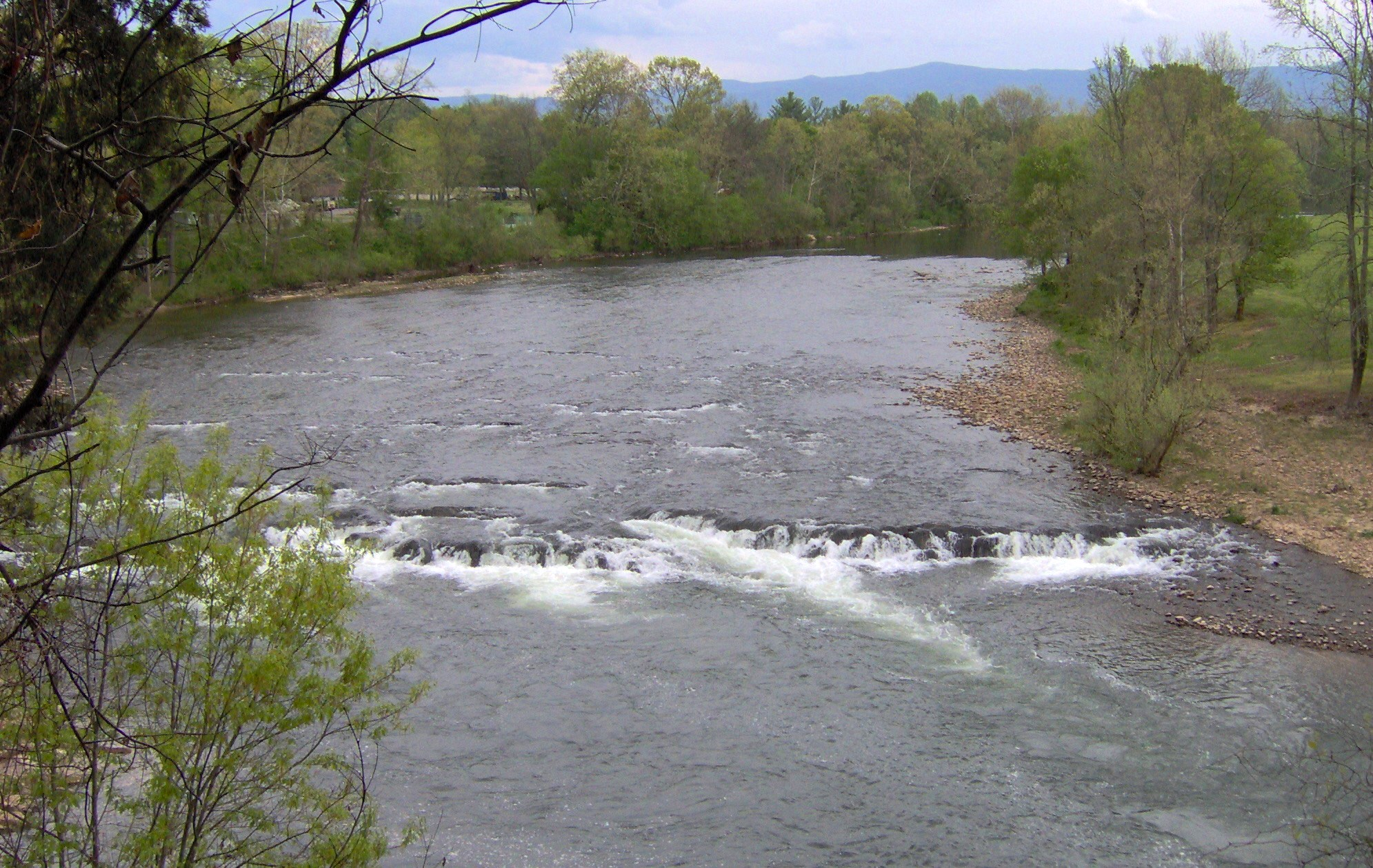
Shoals along the Nolichucky River, downstream from the Crockett birth site

According to his own recollections, Crockett was born "at the mouth of Lime Stone, on the Nola-chucky river." Crockett recalled that his father, John Crockett, had moved to the Tennessee area from Lincoln County, North Carolina, years before. Crockett's father appears in Washington County court records as early as 1778, and appears in Greene County court records throughout the 1780s.

Crockett related an event from his very early childhood in which his brothers almost drowned in the Nolichucky trying to paddle over "a fall in the river, which went slap-right straight down." This may allude to the shoals located along the Nolichucky immediately downstream from the mouth of Big Limestone Creek. Crockett goes on to say that shortly after this incident, his father "removed and settled in the same county, about ten miles above Greenville."

Test excavations conducted at the birthplace site by the Tennessee Division of Archaeology in 1977 failed to locate evidence of an 18th-century cabin. Excavators noted, however, that the site had been significantly disturbed by continuous plowing and cultivation. Along with prehistoric finds, various 18th-century and 19th-century artifacts were uncovered at the site.

== The park today ==
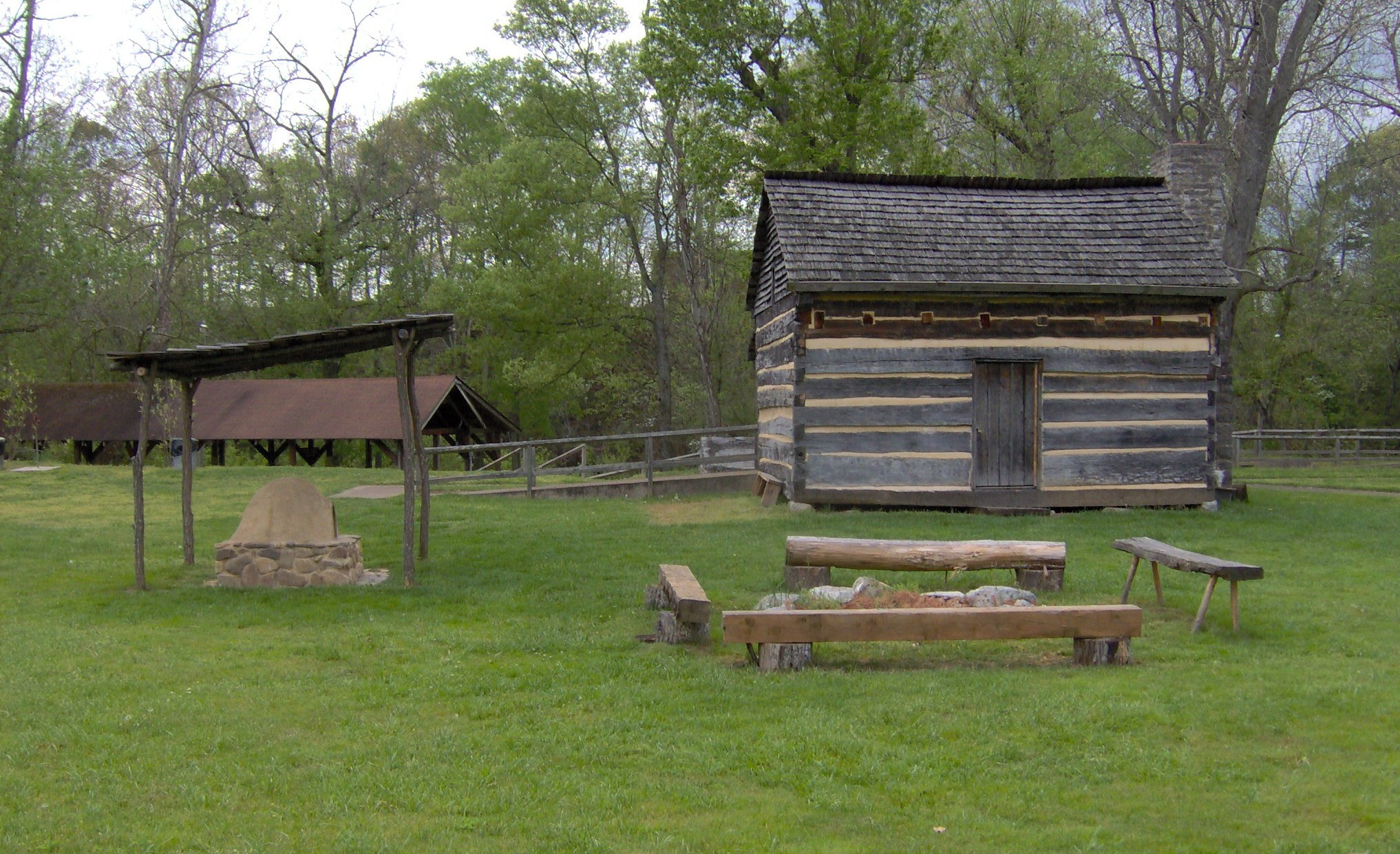
former Cabin replica and former demonstration area

Visitors to David Crockett Birthplace State Park are often surprised to see the birthplace cabin situated on a flat river terrace rather than a "mountaintop," as Crockett's birthplace was described in the 1950s-era song, "The Ballad of Davy Crockett." According to Stonecypher family lore, Samuel Stonecypher, who purchased the land in 1824, dismantled the Crockett cabin and used the logs to build a small house nearby that became known as the Stonecypher cabin. The Stonecyphers claimed that the footstone of the original Crockett cabin, however, remained at that cabin's original site. Sometime in the 1880s, the footstone was adorned with an inscription reading, "On this spot Davy Crockett was born Aug 17 1786." In the 1950s, the Davy Crockett Birthplace Association used the logs from the Stonecypher cabin to build the Crockett cabin replica. The inscribed footstone was placed in front of the cabin replica, where it remains today. Since the Crockett cabin's original design was unknown, the DCBA modeled the cabin after a late 18th-century log cabin located elsewhere in Greene County at the time.

In 1967, the Limestone Ruritan Club placed a large, round monument near the replica cabin. The monument wall contains the names of all 50 U.S. states engraved in stone native to each state. Demonstration areas have been set up behind the cabin to emulate Appalachian frontier life. Other exhibits are located in the park's museum.

In 2017 the park underwent renovations to make the birthsite look more like it would have. The original birthplace cabin was moved to the park entrance and a new pavilion was built.

The park suffered major damage as a result of Hurricane Helene and has been closed to the public since the hurricane. The park had been evacuated beforehand, so there were no injuries, but property damage was extensive. As a result, most of the park is now unusable. While officials are hopeful about rebuilding, there is no projected date for the park reopening.

== Amenities ==
The park's facilities include a visitor center, 88 campground sites, 2 picnic pavilions, 2 picnic areas, a swimming pool, a playground and a public boat launching ramp. Several short hiking trails follow the riverbank and bluffs.

== Photo gallery ==
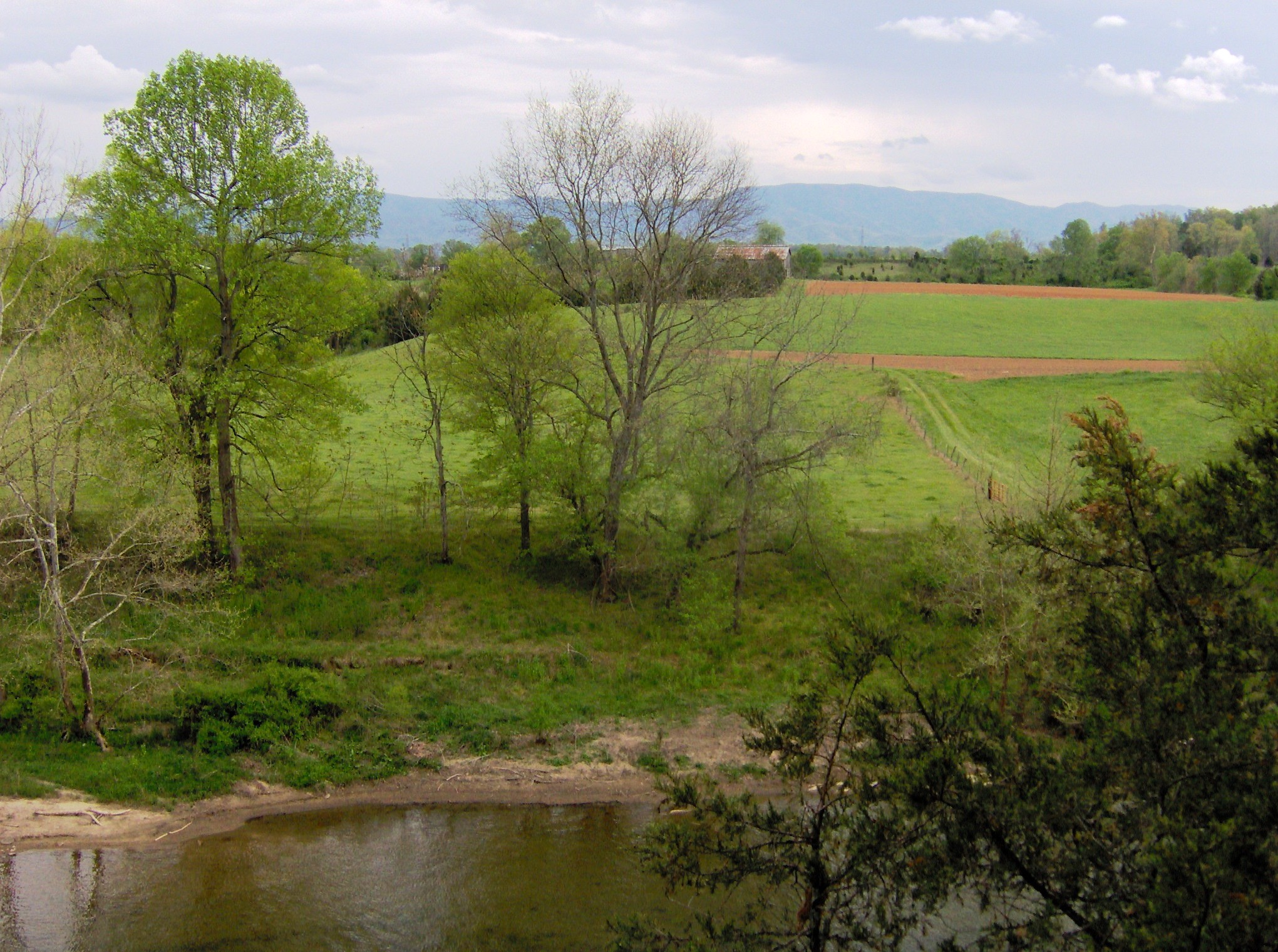
View of the park from the cliffs above the Nolichucky

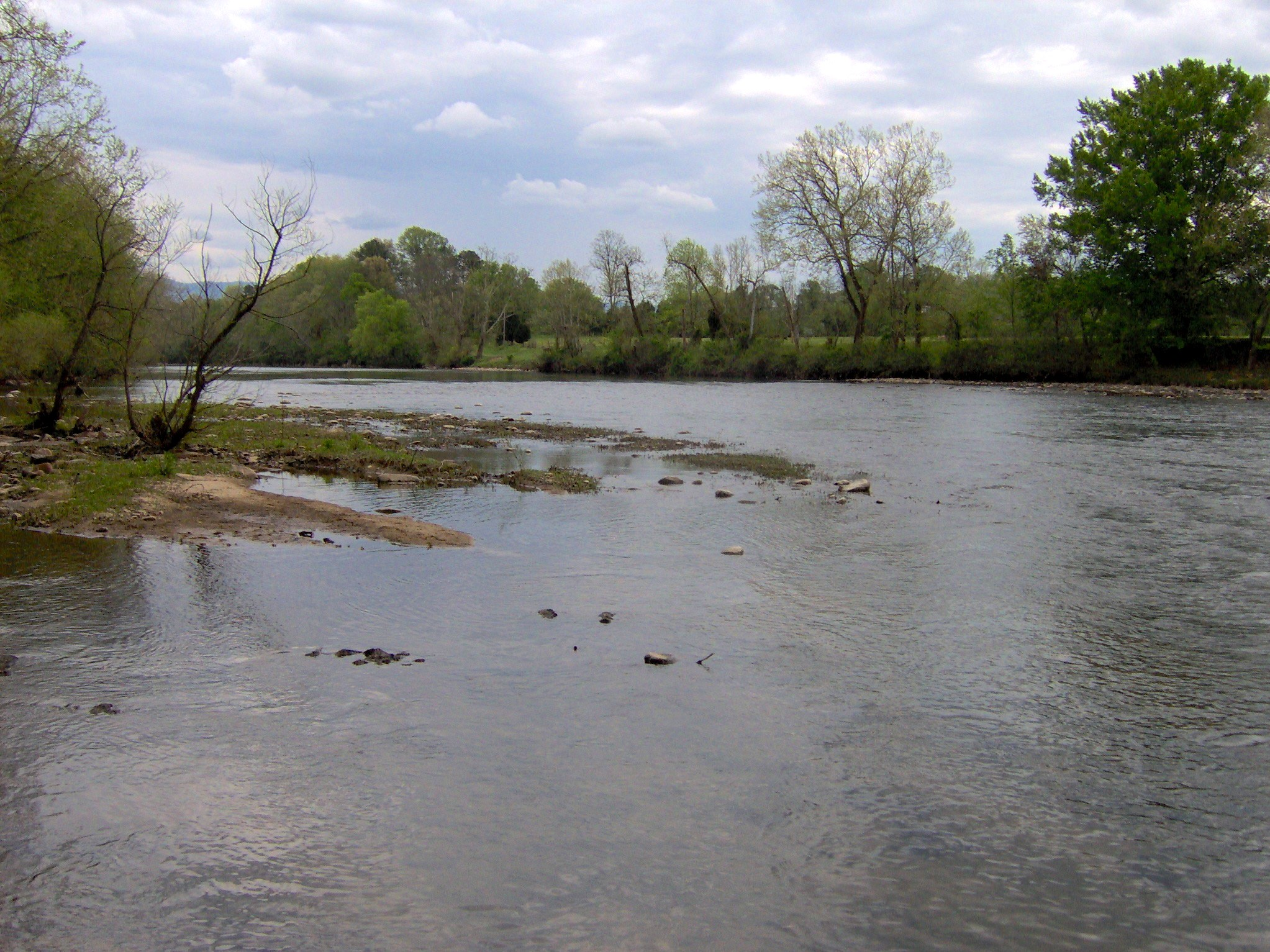
The Nolichucky River, near the campground
