= Glenn D. Broyles =

American politician

Member of the Tennessee House of Representatives from the Greene County district
- In office 1969–1972

Personal details
- Born: June 27, 1926 Limestone, Tennessee
- Died: September 17, 2014 (aged 88) Chuckey, Tennessee
- Party: Republican
- Spouse: Joyce B Broyles (died 2015)
- Occupation: Farmer, farm supply merchant

Glenn D. (Shorty) Broyles (June 27, 1926 – September 17, 2014), was an American politician in the state of Tennessee. Broyles served in the Tennessee House of Representatives from 1969 to 1972. A Republican, he represented Greene County, Tennessee and worked as a farm supply merchant. He lived in Chuckey, Tennessee. On September 17, 2014, he died at the age of 88 at Durham Hensley Nursing Home in Chuckey, TN and is buried at Philadelphia Cumberland Presbyterian Cemetery in Washington County.
