= Chuckey, Tennessee =

Unincorporated community in Tennessee, US

Coordinates: 36.215937°N 82.688207°W

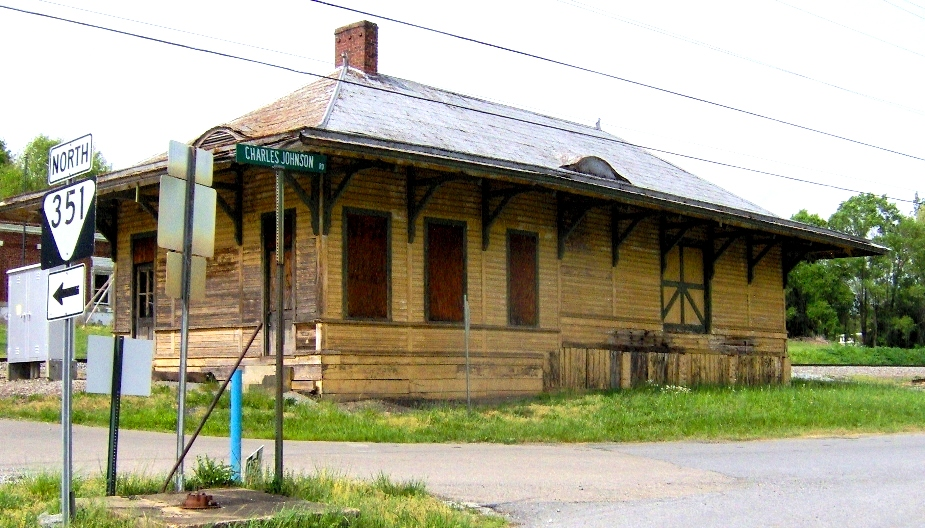
Chuckey Depot, built in 1906, was formerly used by the Southern Railway and now is located in Jonesborough.

Chuckey is an unincorporated community in Greene County, Tennessee. It is located on the Nolichucky River, from which its name is derived. The community is the site of a post office and is assigned zip code 37641.

== History ==
The defunct East Tennessee and Virginia Railroad formerly had a station in Chuckey. The current brick train depot, built by the Southern Railway in 1906, is listed on the National Register of Historic Places. Several farms in Chuckey that date from the community's earliest settlement in the 18th century are included in the Earnest Farms Historic District, also listed on the National Register. Just past the Earnest Farms Historic District sits an imposing ell-shaped brick mansion known as "Glaze Hall", built 1843–1849 by Lawrence Glaze Jr.(1784–1849). The house sits on a rise overlooking the Nolichucky River, within sight of the old Smith Bridge. The bricks used to construct the mansion were all hand-fired on the farm. Both Lawrence Glaze Jr. and his wife, Elizabeth, died from an illness in 1849 before the house was to be completed.

In the 1890s and early 1900s, Chuckey was home to aviation pioneer Edward Chalmers Huffaker (1856–1937). Trained as an engineer, Huffaker's 1895 paper, "The Value of Curved Surfaces in Flight," gained the attention of aviation enthusiast Octave Chanute, who helped Huffaker secure employment at the Smithsonian Institution. Huffaker worked with the Wright brothers at Kitty Hawk in 1901, but left after only one month due to consistent disagreement.

== Truffle cultivation ==
The first U.S. truffle orchard to successfully produce commercial quantities of culinary-quality black Périgord truffles is located in Chuckey. Tom Michaels, who had written a Ph.D. thesis on truffle cultivation, started cultivating truffles in the area in 2000 after observing that the area's limestone soil was similar to the soil of the Périgord region of France, where black truffles are native. In 2007, the first year that truffles were harvested from the orchard, it included 2,500 hazelnut trees growing on 20 acres (8.1 hectares) of land. thirty pounds (14 kilograms) of truffles were produced in the first year.

== Education ==
Chuckey Elementary School is located in Chuckey.

Chuckey-Doak Middle School and Chuckey-Doak High School are the feeder schools for Chuckey Elementary. They are both located in nearby Afton.

== Notable residents ==
- Glenn D. Broyles, member of the Tennessee House of Representatives from 1969 to 1972, lived in Chuckey.
- Ricky Morton, American professional wrestler, operates a wrestling academy in Chuckey.
