= Swaggerty Blockhouse =

- U.S. National Register of Historic Places
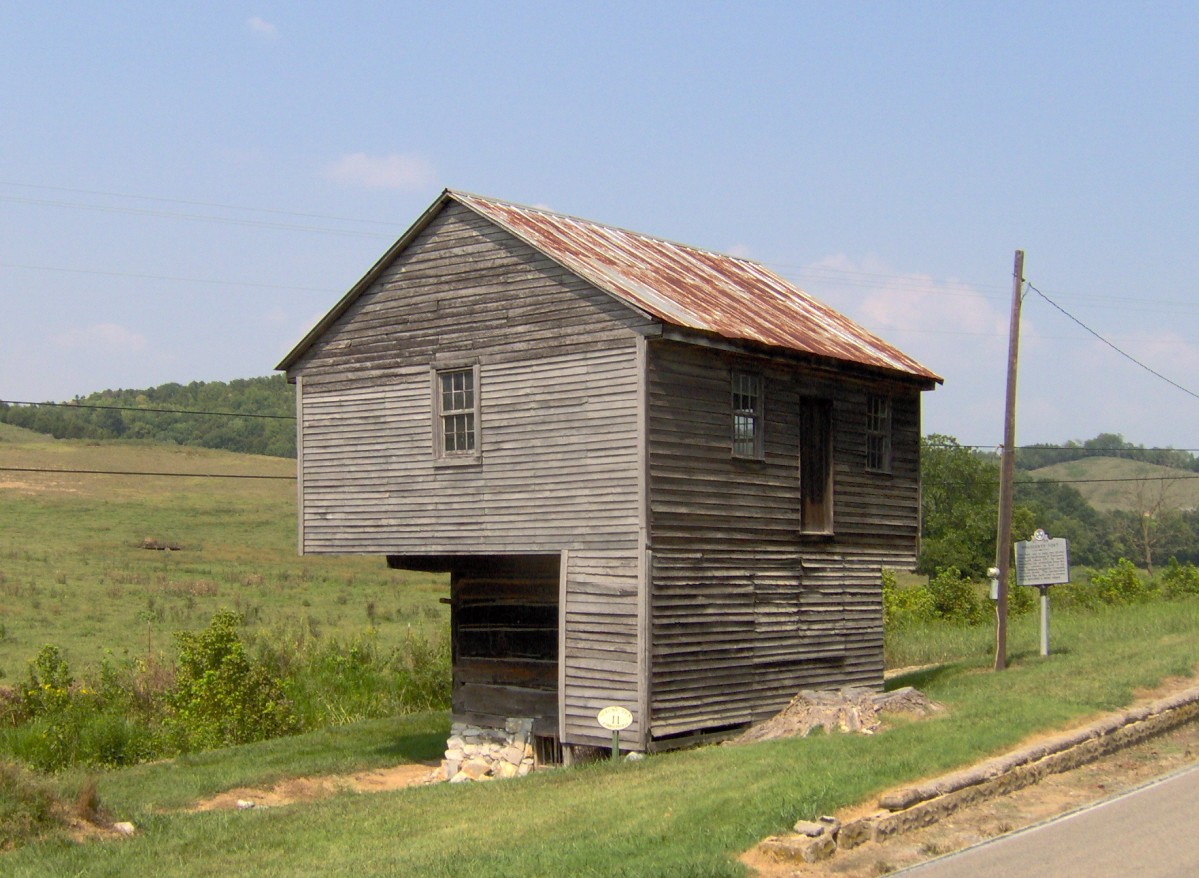
- Swaggerty Blockhouse
- Location: E. of Parrottsville on Old US-321
- Nearest city: Parrottsville, Tennessee
- Coordinates: 36°0′47″N 83°4′16″W
- NRHP reference No.: 73001756
- Added to NRHP: June 18, 1973

The Swaggerty Blockhouse is a historic structure near Parrottsville, in the U.S. state of Tennessee. The structure was originally believed to have been a frontier blockhouse built by early settler James Swaggerty in 1787. Recent archaeological evidence suggests, however, that the structure was actually a cantilever barn built by a farmer named Jacob Stephens around 1860.

In the late 18th-century, blockhouses dotted East Tennessee and the Trans-Appalachian frontier, as attacks from hostile Cherokee and other Native Americans were a constant threat. While the Swaggerty Blockhouse bears some resemblance to historical blockhouse descriptions, it lacks common blockhouse characteristics such as gun portals. The Swaggerty Blockhouse's degree of cantilever (i.e., the degree to which the upper story extends outward beyond the lower story) is also greater than typical frontier blockhouses. Analysis of the tree rings in the Swaggerty Blockhouse's logs indicated a cutting date of 1860, well after the region's frontier period.

== Location ==
The Swaggerty Blockhouse is located just east of Parrottsville along a stretch of U.S. Route 321/U.S. Route 411 known as Newport Highway. Clear Creek, a tributary of the French Broad River, passes a few yards west of the blockhouse. The creek slices a narrow, but fertile valley amidst the foothills of the Bald Mountains, which rise a few miles to the southeast. The farm on which the blockhouse stands is currently owned by the Gillespie family.

== Design ==
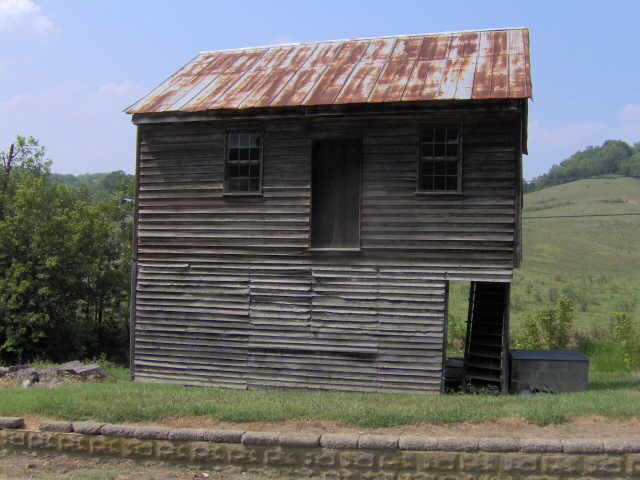
Swaggerty Blockhouse, front view (from Newport Highway)

The Swaggerty Blockhouse consists of three stories, with the first story being the smallest and the top story being the largest. The first story consists of a stone-and-mortar springhouse built around a natural spring which empties into Clear Creek a few yards away. A wellhouse adjacent to the first story was built in the middle 20th-century. The second level consists of hewn oak timbers notched with half-dovetail joints. While the hewing of the second story logs is relatively crude, its notching is very precise, giving it the strength to support the larger third story. Pegs and shelving on the second story indicate that it was once used for storage.

The third level consists of a poplar timber frame notched with mortise and tenon. This most notable feature of this level is its 4-foot (1.2 m) cantilever, or outward extension over the second story. The walls have pane windows facing three directions. Wainscoting along the lower walls and the presence of a front-facing door indicate that this level was once used as a granary. A wooden staircase allows access to the third story. The third-story frame was later extended downward across the front of the second story.

== History ==
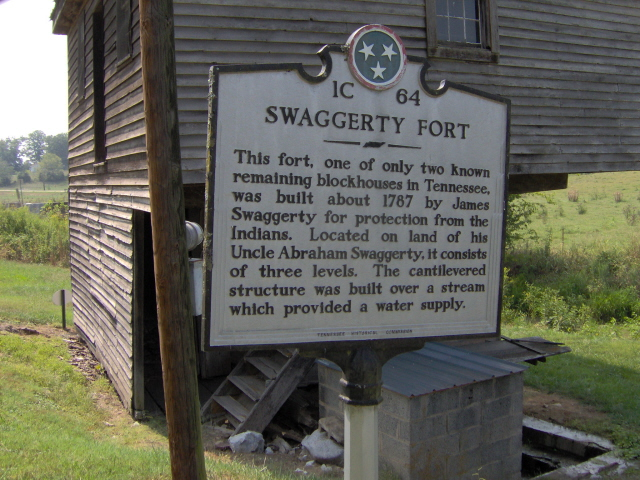
THC marker on east end of the Swaggerty Blockhouse (20th-century wellhouse below)

Frederick Swaggerty, a German immigrant, arrived in the Clear Creek area from Pennsylvania sometime around 1783. According to local sources, Swaggerty's son James built the Swaggerty Blockhouse in 1787, presumably to protect his family from hostile Cherokee attacks. If true, this would make the Swaggerty Blockhouse the only surviving blockhouse at its original site in the state of Tennessee.

In 1824, ownership of the Swaggerty property was passed to James Swaggerty who in turn sold it to Jacob Stephens in 1850. Over subsequent decades, Stephens established a fairly sizeable farm. At one point, Stephens owned 75 hogs and his farm was valued at $4,500. One-third of the farm's production consisted of pork products or corn. The Stephens family retained ownership of the farm until 1921, when it was sold to the Gillespie family. The Gillespies have since preserved the blockhouse. In 1973, the blockhouse was placed on the National Register of Historic Places.

== Archaeological investigation ==
In 2001, David Mann of the University of Tennessee conducted both a dendrochronological and standard archaeological study of the Swaggerty Blockhouse and adjacent grounds to determine the structure's age. The dendrochronological investigation, which essentially analyzed the tree rings of a structure's logs, determined that the Swaggerty Blockhouse's logs were cut sometime around 1860, and thus could not have been used in a late 18th-century blockhouse. Excavations around the blockhouse turned up cut nails and glass and ceramic artifacts, most all of which dated to the period between 1852 and 1864. Swine bones and ashes discovered on the north side of the blockhouse indicate that this area may have once been used for butchering hogs. Excavations also uncovered the remnants of a wagon road once leading to the door of the blockhouse.

=== Blockhouse vs. cantilever barn ===
Mann concluded that the Swaggerty Blockhouse was likely a cantilever barn built around 1860 by Jacob Stephens, rather than a frontier blockhouse built by James Swaggerty in 1787. The Swaggerty Blockhouse lacks certain characteristics typical of a frontier blockhouse, such as gun portals and a short degree of cantilever (2 feet or less). The mortise-and-tenon notching and frame design of the third story are more indicative of a 19th-century cantilever barn.

The cutting date of the structure's logs (ca. 1860) and the artifacts assembled from excavations on adjacent grounds provide the most compelling evidence for the later construction date. Most of the artifacts dated to the middle 19th-century, while there was an absence of artifacts (such as creamware and hand-wrought nails) typically found at 18th-century frontier sites. Mann surmises that the first story was likely a springhouse used for the storage of perishable foods (rather than a protected water supply), the second story used for storage of tools, and the third used for grain storage. Jacob Stephens, who was an active hog farmer, likely used the north side of the structure as a butchering area.
