= Maden Hall Farm =

Historic house in Tennessee, United States

- U.S. National Register of Historic Places
- U.S. Historic district
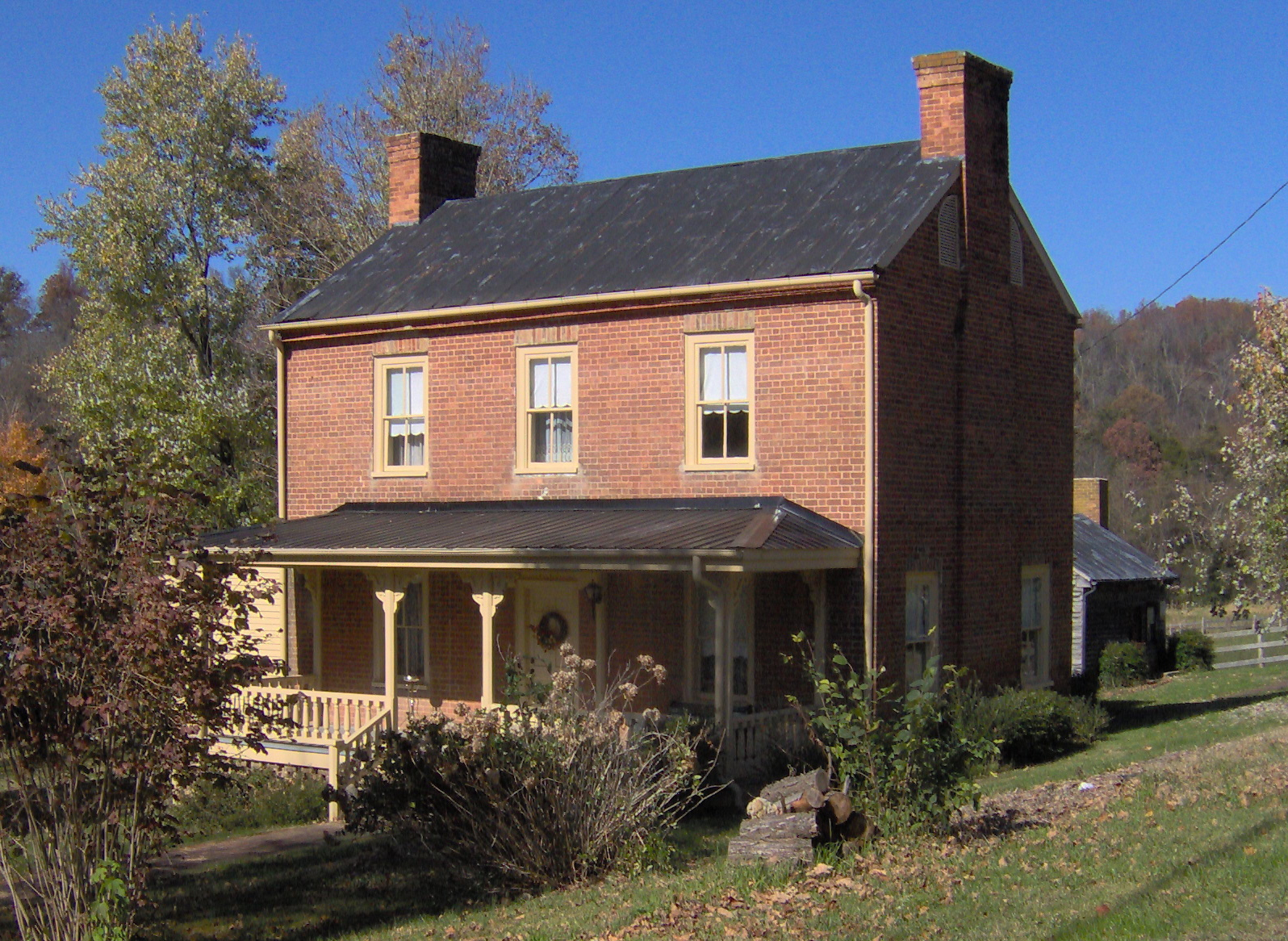
- Maden Hall farmhouse

- Location within Tennessee Location within the United States
- Location: 3225 Kingsport Highway
- Nearest city: Greeneville, Tennessee
- Coordinates: 36°13′1.6″N 82°47′39.99″W
- Area: 17 acres (6.9 ha)
- Built: 1825
- Architectural style: Federal
- NRHP reference No.: 09000667
- Added to NRHP: August 27, 2009

Maden Hall Farm, also called the Fermanagh-Ross Farm, is a historic farm near the U.S. city of Greeneville, Tennessee. Established in the 1820s, the farmstead consists of a farmhouse and six outbuildings situated on the remaining 17 acres (6.9 ha) of what was once a 300-acre (120 ha) antebellum farm. Maden Hall has been designated a century farm and has been placed on the National Register of Historic Places.

William Ross II (1790–1865), the son of a Scotch-Irish immigrant, built the Maden Hall farmhouse in 1825, and in subsequent years acquired the surrounding land, much of it given to him by his father-in-law, John Gass. In spite of raids from bushwhackers, the farm survived the U.S. Civil War intact, and after the war the farm was maintained by Ross's children and grandchildren, most of whom made relatively few changes to the farm over several decades. In 1968, former University of Tennessee football standout Len Coffman (1915–2007) and wife Jennie King (a Ross descendant) purchased the farm from King's relatives. The Coffmans' daughter, Carol, is the farm's current owner.

== Location ==
Maden Hall is situated at the intersection of Kingsport Highway (State Route 93) and Gass Memorial Road, just north of Greeneville. The farm is surrounded by hills on the north, east, and south, and on the west by a valley created by South Fork Roaring Fork Creek (a tributary of Lick Creek). The farmhouse and outbuildings are on the west side of Gass Memorial Road, although the farm includes pastureland and woodland on the north side of the road.

== History ==
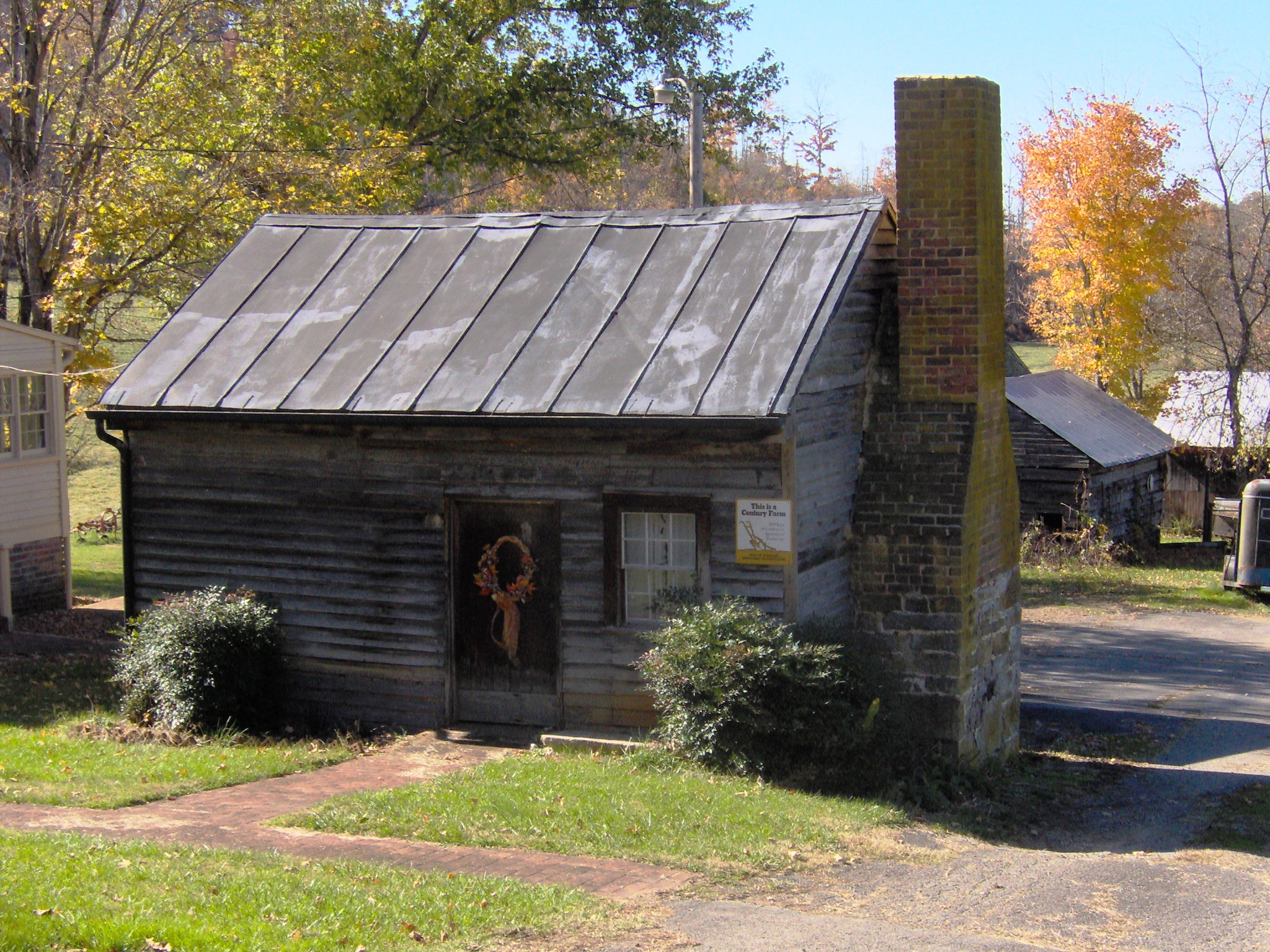
Maden Hall detached kitchen/slave cabin

William Ross was born in County Fermanagh in Ireland in 1742 and immigrated with his parents to Virginia in 1759. He served in the American Revolution, and in 1786 received a land grant in Greene County, Tennessee as payment for his service. Ross's son, William Ross II, was born in Greene County in 1790.

Scottish immigrant Alexander McAmish settled on what is now the Maden Hall Farm in the late-18th century, and he apparently gave it the name "Maden Hall." Around 1825, William Ross II purchased a 1.25-acre (0.51 ha) parcel of land from McAmish, and built the Maden Hall farmhouse shortly thereafter. The Maden Hall property was adjacent to land owned by Ross's father-in-law, prominent Greene County politician John Gass. Gass, one of the Overmountain Men who fought Kings Mountain in 1780, was a delegate to Tennessee constitutional convention in 1796, and established a school and church just west of the modern Maden Hall Farm (Gass Memorial Road connects the two areas). Ross married Gass's daughter, Margaret, in 1813, and in 1835 Gass deeded to Ross a large portion of the property adjacent to Maden Hall. Ross primarily grew wheat, corn, flax, and oats, and raised livestock.

By the time of the U.S. Civil War, Ross's Maden Hall holdings consisted of 300 acres (120 ha) and 12 slaves. In a memoir, Ross's grandson, John Gass Ross, mentioned several of his grandfather's slaves, among them a "slave boss" known as "Old Barney," and two others known as "Aunt Sarah" and "Louis." Ross recalled playing in the cantilever barn with a young slave named "Little Jim." Ross also wrote that during the war, his grandfather invited his relatives to live at Maden Hall, as it was self-sustaining and relatively isolated. Bushwhackers raided the farm several times, stealing crops, livestock, and farm tools.

=== Post-Civil War ===
After the death of William Ross II in 1865, Maden Hall passed to his son, David Ross, who sold it to another Ross son, William Ross III (1816–1893), two years later. Upon his death in 1893, William Ross III left Maden Hall to his son, Vincent Ross, who died just four years later. Vincent Ross's widow, Mollie Mays Ross (1857–1941), managed Maden Hall until 1929, and left the farm to her children. In the 1920s, tobacco became the Maden Hall Farm's chief crop.

In 1968, Jennie King Coffman (a granddaughter of Mollie Ross) and husband Leonard "Len" Coffman acquired Maden Hall. Len Coffman played football for the University of Tennessee under Coach Robert Neyland in the late 1930s, and was drafted to play in the NFL in 1940. He later worked as an assistant coach under Bowden Wyatt at the University of Wyoming. The Coffmans made several additions to the Maden Hall house in the 1970s, most notably the addition of a front porch, a patio, and a new kitchen wing. The Coffmans' daughter, Carol, took the necessary steps to have the farm placed on the National Register of Historic Places.

== Historical structures ==
=== Farmhouse ===
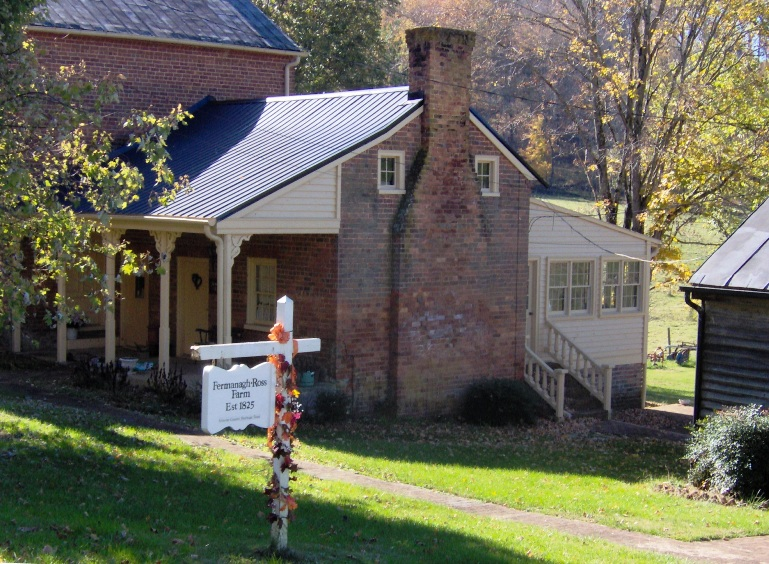
Rear view of the Maden Hall farmhouse, showing the rear ell wing

The Maden Hall farmhouse is a two-story Federal-style brick house with a 1.5-story ell and a 1-story kitchen wing. The main wing of the house measures 33 feet (10 m) by 22 feet (6.7 m), and the ell measures 16 feet (4.9 m) by 25 feet (7.6 m). The kitchen wing, added to the east side of the house in the 1970s, measures 16 feet (4.9 m) by 37 feet (11 m). The bricks of the original portions of the house were laid in Flemish bond, whereas the bricks of the new kitchen wing were laid in common bond. The house's gable roofs were originally covered with wooden shingles, but these have been replaced by seam metal panels.

Around 1910, the interior of the house was damaged by fire, and was replaced with Queen Anne design elements. The interior follows a central hall floor plan, although whether or not this was the original floor plan or a result of renovations after the 1910s fire is uncertain. The main staircase, fireplace mantels, and first-level floor structure were also replaced as a result of the fire. The entrance to the main section of the house is decorated with a five-point star topped by a crescent moon, which may allude to the early Rosses' Mason activities. The ell wing originally housed a kitchen, but was converted into a den in the 1970s.

=== Outbuildings ===
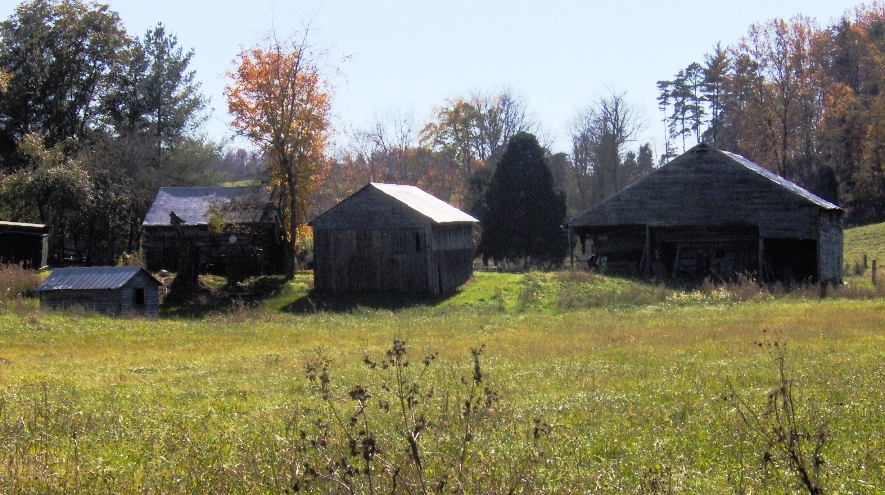
Maden Hall Farm outbuildings

Maden Hall Farm has six outbuildings considered contributing to the NRHP property:

- An 1820s-era 16-foot (4.9 m) by 20-foot (6.1 m) slave cabin and detached kitchen, located almost adjacent to the main house's ell wing. The cabin's walls are made of sawn timber, and the cabin rests on a mixed brick and stone foundation.
- An 1820s-era 14-foot (4.3 m) by 16-foot (4.9 m) smokehouse, built of hewn logs connected with half-dovetail notching.
- An 1840s-era 45-foot (14 m) by 63-foot (19 m) cantilever barn. The barn consists of two 18-foot (5.5 m) by 20-foot (6.1 m) cribs built of V-notched hewn logs. A small shed was added to the east side of the barn in 1956. The barn's loft cantilevers about 4 feet (1.2 m) out beyond the cribs, bearing more resemblance to cantilever barn types found in Southwest Virginia than to the great cantilever barns in Sevier and Blount counties in Tennessee.
- An 1840s-era 18-foot (5.5 m) by 20-foot (6.1 m) corn crib and shed, built of V-notched hewn logs. The corn crib occupies the northern one-third of the structure.
- A 1910s-era 15-foot (4.6 m) by 7-foot (2.1 m) springhouse, originally built over a natural spring that feeds into South Fork Roaring Fork Creek. The springhouse consists of two compartments, one containing a trough originally used for storing perishables, the other allowing easy access to the spring for drinking water.
- A 1940s-era 18-foot (5.5 m) by 26-foot (7.9 m) frame hog house, originally used for loading hogs, but later used as a storage shed.

== See also ==
- Earnest Farms Historic District
