= Earnest Farms Historic District =

Historic district in Tennessee, United States

- U.S. National Register of Historic Places
- U.S. Historic district
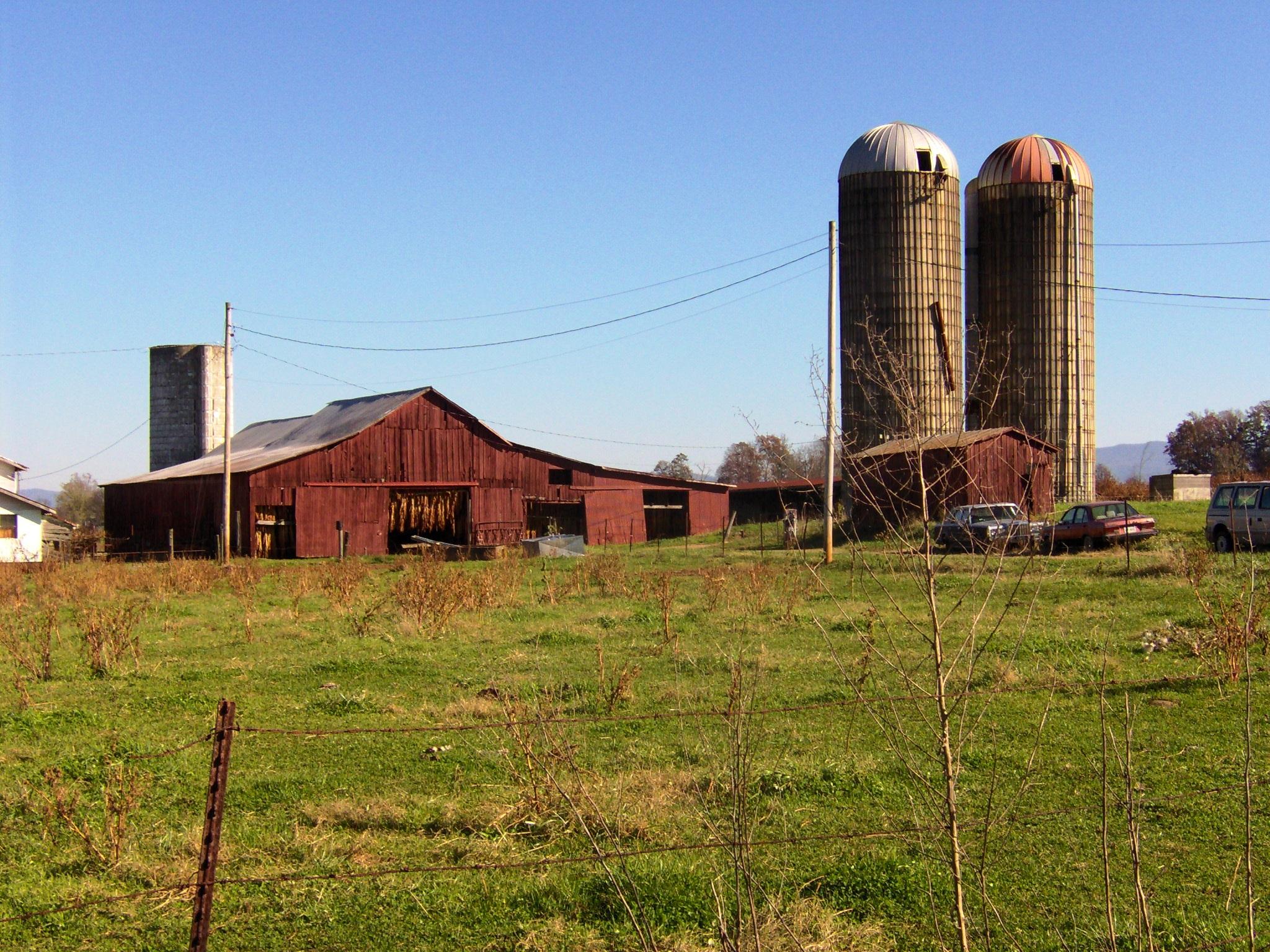
- Tobacco barn and silos at the Broyles Farm

- Location within Tennessee Location within the United States
- Location: Greene County, at Chuckey, Tennessee
- Coordinates: 36°11′54″N 82°40′51″W
- Area: appx. 900 acres (360 ha)
- Built: 1782–1951
- Architectural style: Federal, Bungalow, Italianate influence, I-house
- MPS: Transformation of the Nolichucky Valley MPS
- NRHP reference No.: 01001449
- Added to NRHP: January 11, 2002

The Earnest Farms Historic District is a historic district consisting of four historic farms and associated structures near the community of Chuckey in Greene County, Tennessee, United States. The farms include the Elmwood Farm, the Broyles Farm, the Crum Farm, and the Jim Earnest Farm, all of which were initially developed by early pioneer Henry Earnest (1732–1809) and his descendants in the late-18th and 19th centuries. The district includes the Ebenezer Methodist Church, which is home to the oldest Methodist congregation in Tennessee, and the Earnest Fort House, which is one of the oldest houses in the state. Elmwood Farm has been designated a century farm and is one of the oldest farms in Tennessee, having been cultivated continuously since 1777.

Henry Earnest settled along the banks of the Nolichucky River in 1774 and built the Earnest Fort House on a bluff overlooking the river in 1782. Earnest donated the land for the Ebenezer Methodist Church, which was completed in 1795 and ordained that same year by Bishop Francis Asbury. When Earnest died in 1809, his land was divided up among his children, with his son Peter receiving what is now the Elmwood Farm and son Henry Earnest, Jr. receiving what is now the Broyles Farm. Throughout the 19th century, the Earnests operated their farms as small business enterprises, selling much of their produce for profits. In the early 20th century, the Broyles family purchased the Henry Earnest, Jr. Farm and in subsequent years converted it into a dairy farming operation. The historic district contains 43 contributing structures or sites.

== Geographic layout ==
The Nolichucky River bends in a half-rectangle around the Earnest Farms Historic District, forming its eastern, northern, and western boundaries, the exception being the Earnest Fort House, which lies immediately north of the river. The Crum Farm is the easternmost farm in the district, with the Nolichucky running along its eastern and northern boundaries. The Broyles Farm is immediately west of the Crum Farm, and Elmwood Farm is immediately west of the Broyles Farm. The Jim Earnest Farm is immediately southwest of Elmwood, with the river flowing along the western boundary of the Elmwood and Jim Earnest farms. The southern boundaries of all four farms collectively provide the district's southern boundary.

Tennessee State Route 351 (known locally as Chuckey Pike) traverses Elmwood Farm north-to-south, connecting the area with the Chuckey community across the river to the north and the Cherokee National Forest to the south. Along the south boundary of the Elmwood Farm, TN-351 gradually ascends to the top of a 100-foot (30 m) hill, from which there is a dramatic view of the Bald Mountains spanning the horizon to the south. Davy Crockett Birthplace State Park, the traditional birthplace of frontiersman Davy Crockett, lies along the east bank of the Nolichucky opposite the Crum Farm.

== History ==
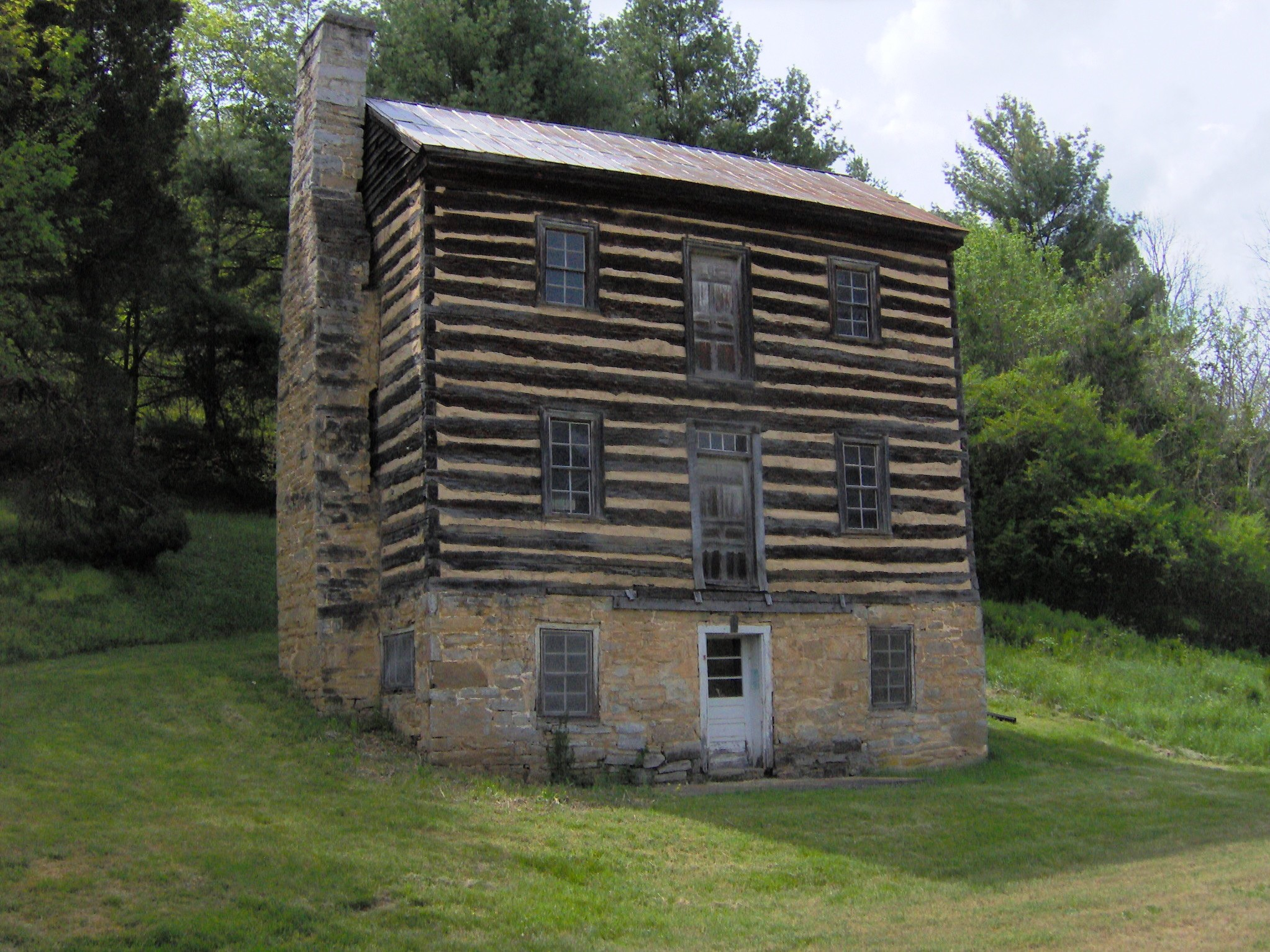
The Earnest Fort House, built in 1782

Henry Earnest was born Heinrich Ernst in Dattlikon, Switzerland in 1732, and immigrated with his parents to Virginia in the 1740s. After serving with the Virginia militia in the French and Indian War, he married Mary Stephens, the daughter of his benefactor, in the 1760s, and migrated southwestward. By 1774, he had arrived in what is now Greene County. The Earnests supported the Patriot cause during the American Revolution, and Earnest's son, Felix, fought at the Battle of Kings Mountain in 1780. The Earnests also played a role in the creation of Greene County in 1783, and Henry Earnest served as the county's first tax assessor.

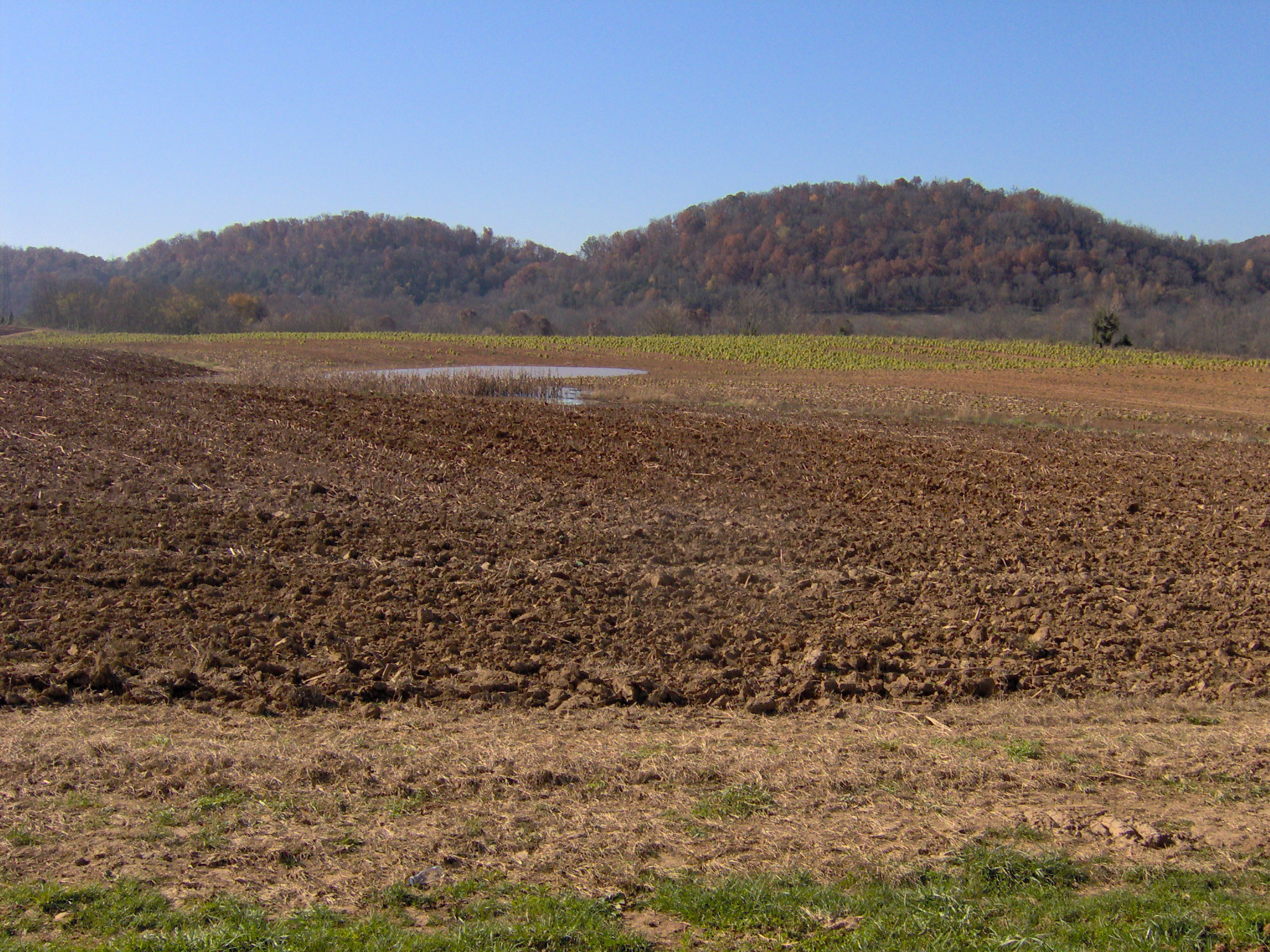
Elmwood Farm fields

Earnest built the Earnest Fort House in 1782, and developed the adjacent land into a profitable farm. He began work on the Henry and Peter Earnest House (across the river from the fort house) around 1800. Upon his death in 1809, his farm was divided up among his children, with his son Peter (1777–1862) inheriting what is now Elmwood, his son Henry, Jr. (1772–1851) inheriting what is now the Broyles Farm, and his son Felix (1762–1842) inheriting what is now the Jim Earnest Farm. Peter renovated and expanded the house his father had built, and Henry Earnest, Jr. built a similarly designed house (now the Earnest-Broyles House) during the same period.

Peter, Henry, Jr., and their brother Jacob were all listed as merchants throughout the first half of the 19th century, and their names consistently appear in the ledgers of a general store in Leesburg, (near Jonesborough). Felix Earnest was a minister and leader in the Methodist Church, having been ordained a deacon by Bishop Francis Asbury in 1806 and elevated to Elder by Joshua Soule in 1825. Henry Earnest, Jr. represented Greene County in the state senate 1811–1813, and became a charter board member of Tusculum College upon its founding in 1818. When the East Tennessee and Georgia Railroad completed tracks through Chuckey in the 1850s, Peter Earnest established a toll bridge to connect the Earnest farms to the railroad.

While the Earnests were slave owners, two members of the Earnest family, listed as "B Earnest" and "N Earnest," were part of the Greene County delegation to the East Tennessee Convention at Greeneville on the eve of the Civil War in June 1861. The Earnest farms survived the war mostly intact, although the local economy was in ruins. The toll bridge was replaced in 1869, and again in 1903. In the 1940s, the Broyles family (who had purchased the Henry Earnest, Jr. properties) established a large dairy complex on the Broyles farm, mainly to take advantage of a Pet Milk condensing plant that had been established in Greeneville, although the dairy operation ultimately failed. Today, tobacco is the chief crop of the Elmwood, Broyles, and Crum farms.

=== Ebenezer Methodist Church ===
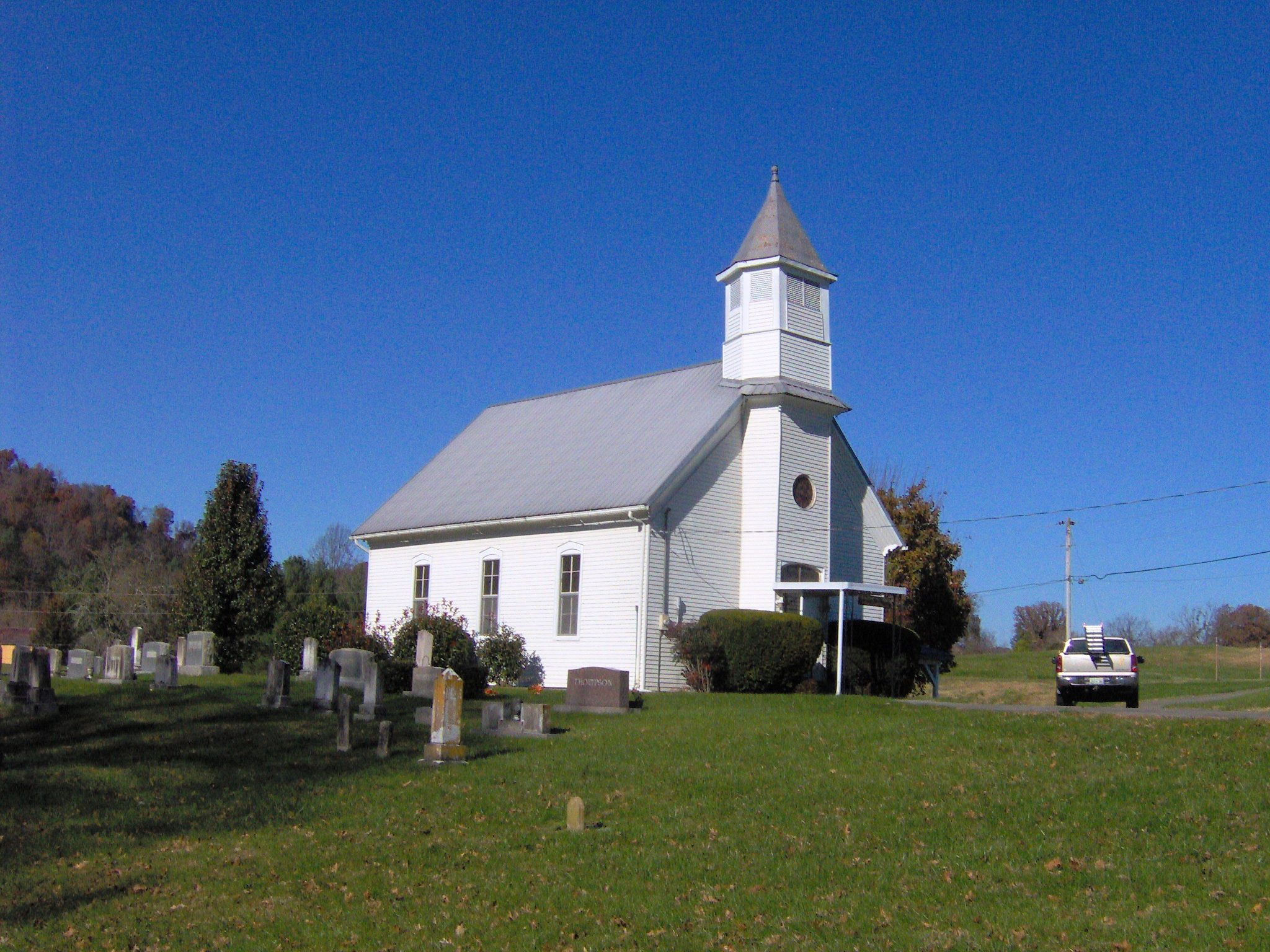
Ebenezer Methodist Church

Sometime in the early 1790s, the Earnests and several other area families formed a Methodist society. Methodist circuit rider Francis Asbury delivered a sermon before 200 people at "Squire Earnest's" in 1793, and mentioned that a society of 31 members had been formed. The Earnests eventually donated a parcel of land (between the river and the Jim Earnest Farm) for the construction of a meeting house. On April 27, 1795, Asbury dedicated the new meeting house, marking the beginning of the Ebenezer Methodist Church. The current Ebenezer Methodist Church building, built on the site of the 1795 meeting house, was completed in 1899.

The church is a one-story framed structure, with a metal gabled roof. The exterior walls were originally weatherboarded, but this has been replaced with vinyl siding. The building has a gabled, metal roof and a concrete block foundation. The church's louvered bell tower is two stories, and contains a bell purchased from the Cincinnati Bell Foundry. The interior includes the original wooden siding, hand-painted doors and pews, and a stained glass window. The church's cemetery, which also listed as a contributing property in the historic district, contains the burials of several Earnests and other families associated with church, and at least two slave burials (known only as "Zona" and "Corby").

== Notable historical structures ==
=== Elmwood Farm ===
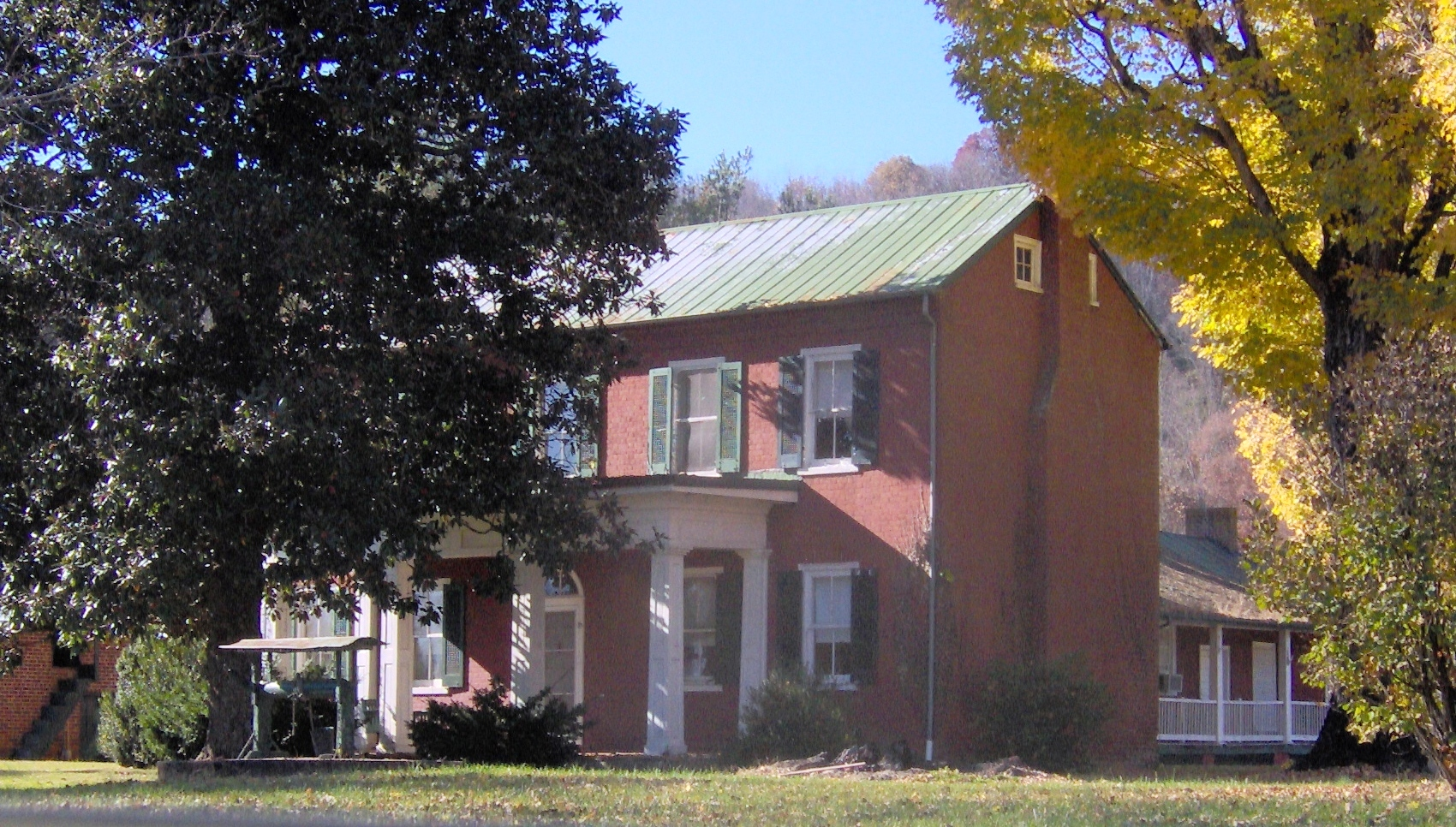
The Henry and Peter Earnest House, initially built in 1800 and expanded in 1820

What is now the Elmwood Farm was part of the land inherited by Peter Earnest from his father, Henry, in 1809. Upon Peter Earnest's death in 1862, the farm passed to his son, Benjamin, and upon Benjamin's death in 1887, it passed to Benjamin's son Nicholas Earnest. Nicholas Earnest managed Elmwood until his death in 1956, when it was divided among his six children. His daughter, Katherine Earnest Clemmer, then purchased her siblings' share of the farm. Elmwood is the only farm in the district that remains in the hands of Earnest descendants, and in 2002 was designated a Tennessee Century Farm. It is the second-oldest farm in the state, behind only the Masengill Farm in Sullivan County. The farm's eleven contributing structures include:

- The Earnest Fort House, also called the Mauris-Earnest Fort House, a three-story structure completed in 1782 or 1783. The first-story walls were built out of limestone blocks, and the second and third stories were built using logs connected with "V" notches. This building was originally added to the National Register of Historic Places in a separate listing in 1978.
- The Henry and Peter Earnest House, a two-story brick Federal-style I-house begun in the early 19th century (or possibly earlier) and expanded over subsequent decades. Henry Earnest built the rear wing of the house around 1800, and Peter Earnest added the Federal-style front facade in 1820, creating the I-house formation, and added a smokehouse and slave quarters to the rear. An open-air porch was added to the east side of the rear wing in the 1850s, and a Colonial Revival-style portico was added to the west side in the 1920s.
- The Earnest Bridge Substructure, a stone bridge abutment rising out of the middle of the river immediately west of the modern TN-351 bridge. The abutment was built in 1903 using stones from 1869 Earnest toll bridge. It was destroyed by the flooding from Hurricane Helene in September 2024.
- A two-story brick smokehouse, located just west of the Henry and Peter Earnest House, built around 1820 for use as a smokehouse, but later used for milk storage when dairy operations were established at the farm. The smokehouse has a cantilevered shed roof.

=== Broyles Farm ===
The Broyles Farm was originally part of the land inherited by Henry Earnest, Jr. from his father in 1809. The Broyles family purchased the farm in 1903. The farm's eighteen contributing structures include:

- The Earnest-Broyles House, a two-story brick Federal-style I-house originally built by Henry Earnest, Jr. in 1820. The house has a Colonial Revival-influenced portico and a Federal-influence interior.
- A two-story frame tobacco barn, built around 1940.
- A board-and-batten stock/tobacco barn, built around 1920. The barn was originally built to house livestock, but is now used for tobacco.
- Three concrete silos, one built in the 1940s, and two (side-by-side) built in the 1950s. The older silo no longer has its dome roof, while the two newer silos have dome metal roofs.
- A two-story concrete structure originally used as a milk house for the farm's dairy operations, but later used as a tenant house.

=== Crum Farm ===
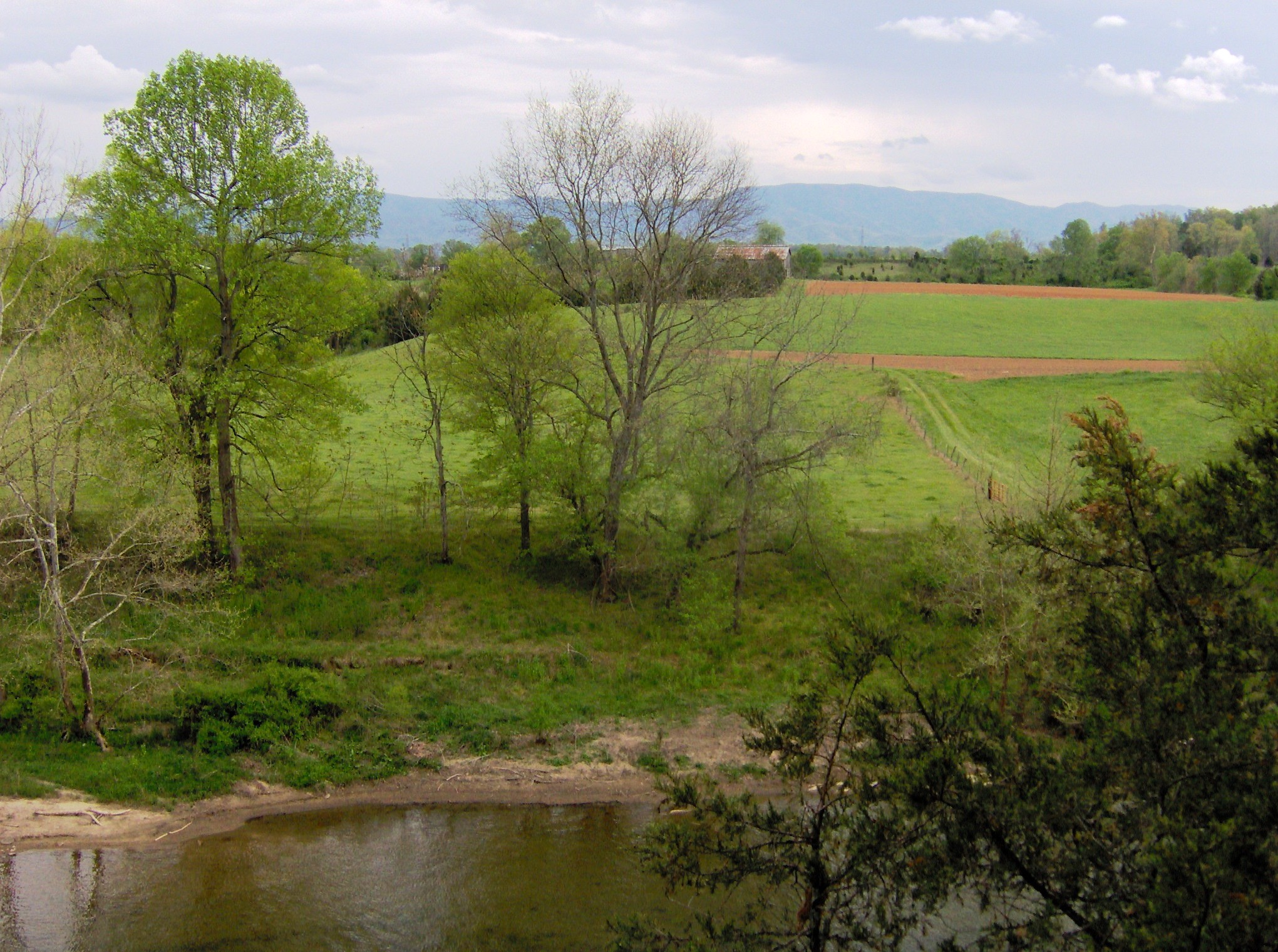
Crum Farm, viewed from a bluff along the Nolichucky River

The Crum Farm is a tobacco farm developed in the 1920s. The Crum Farm's eight contributing structures include:

- The Crum Bungalow, a 1.5-story house built around 1920. The house has a metal roof and brick foundation.
- A board-and-batten chicken coop, built around 1930. This building design may have been influenced by designs provided by the University of Tennessee in the 1920s.
- A board-and-batten wood shop, built around 1920.

=== Jim Earnest Farmstead ===
The Jim Earnest Farmstead is part of the land inherited by Felix Earnest from his father, Henry Earnest, in 1809. After Felix Earnest's death in 1841, the farm passed to his two sons, James Oliphant Earnest and William McKendrie Earnest. The latter's son, Jim Harvey Earnest, inherited the farm in 1902, and managed it until the 1930s. The farmstead has four contributing structures:

- The Jim Earnest House, a three-story Folk Victorian style house built around 1880. A central projecting bay on the front facade resembles Italianate tower designs. The house has weatherboard siding and an asphalt shingle roof.
- A one-story board-and-batten tobacco barn, built circa 1920.
- A one-story tenant house, built circa 1900, with a metal roof added in the 1920s.
- A board-and-batten storage shed, built around 1920.

== See also ==
- Maden Hall Farm
