= Conway Bridge =

Former bridge in Tennessee, US

- Formerly listed on the U.S. National Register of Historic Places
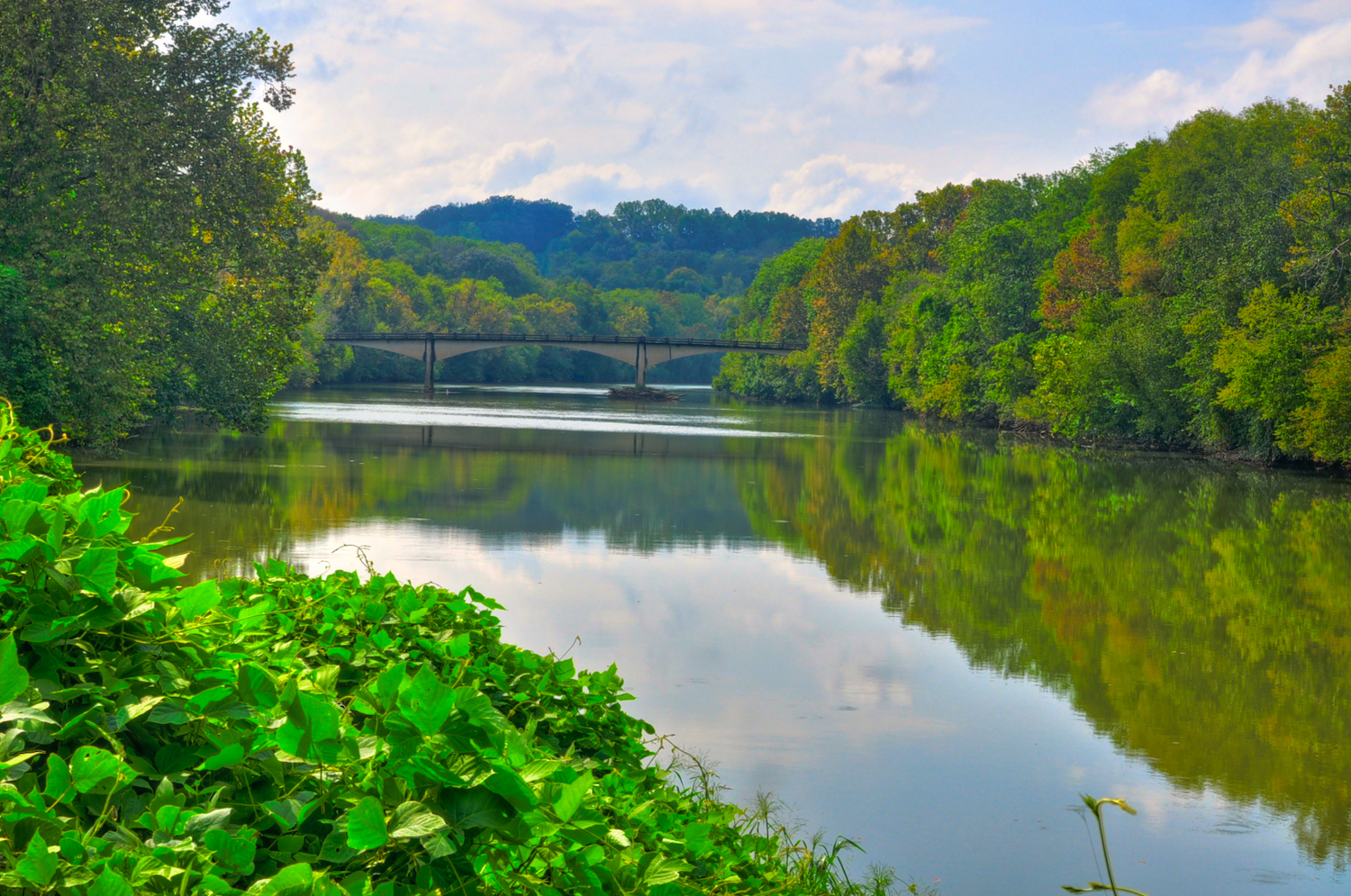

- Location within Tennessee Location within the United States
- Nearest city: Briar Thicket, Tennessee
- Coordinates: 36°7′26″N 83°7′31″W
- Area: less than one acre
- Built: 1925
- Built by: Steel and Lebby Bridge Co.
- NRHP reference No.: 09000948

Significant dates
- Added to NRHP: November 20, 2009
- Removed from NRHP: March 17, 2025

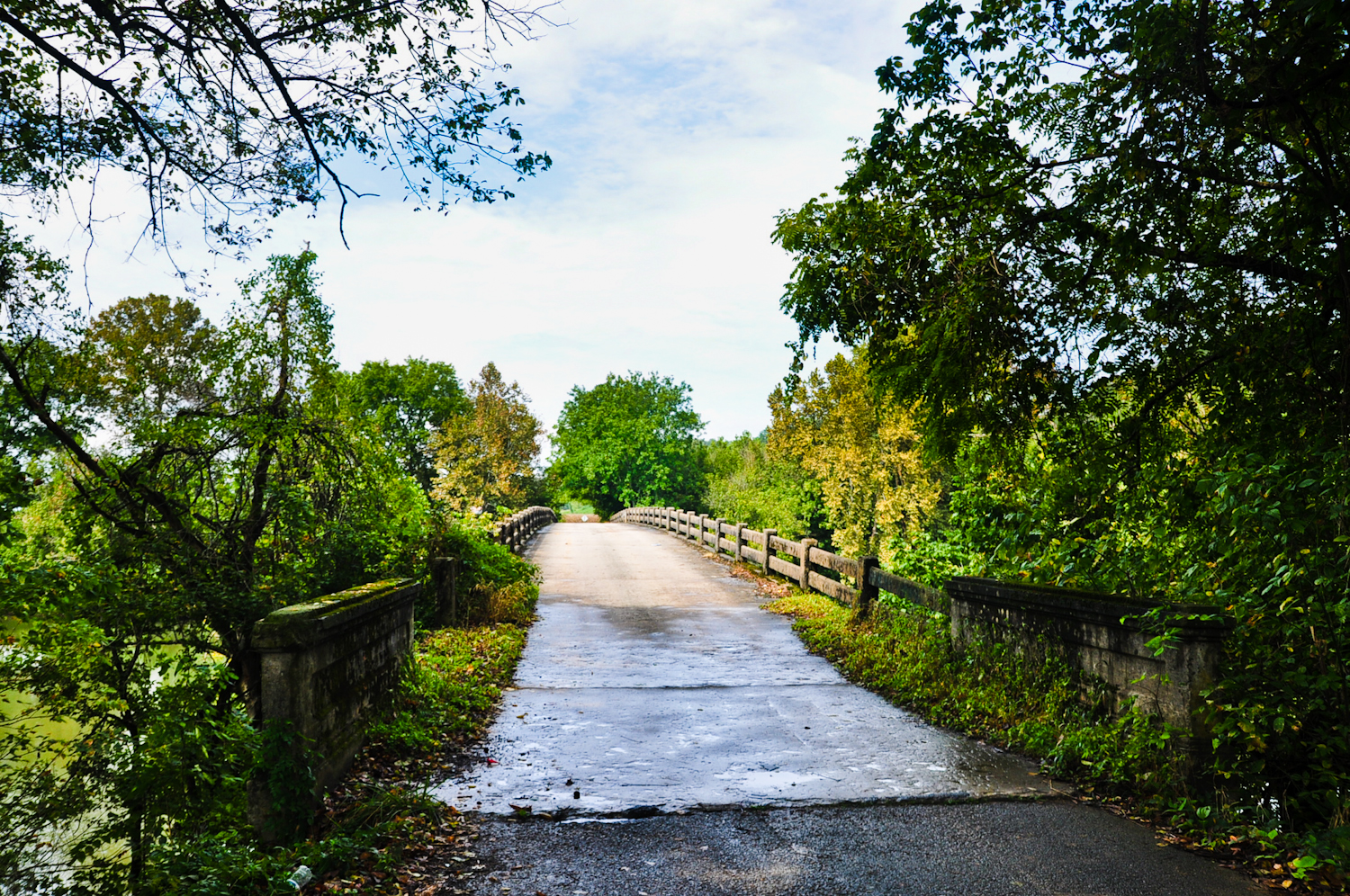

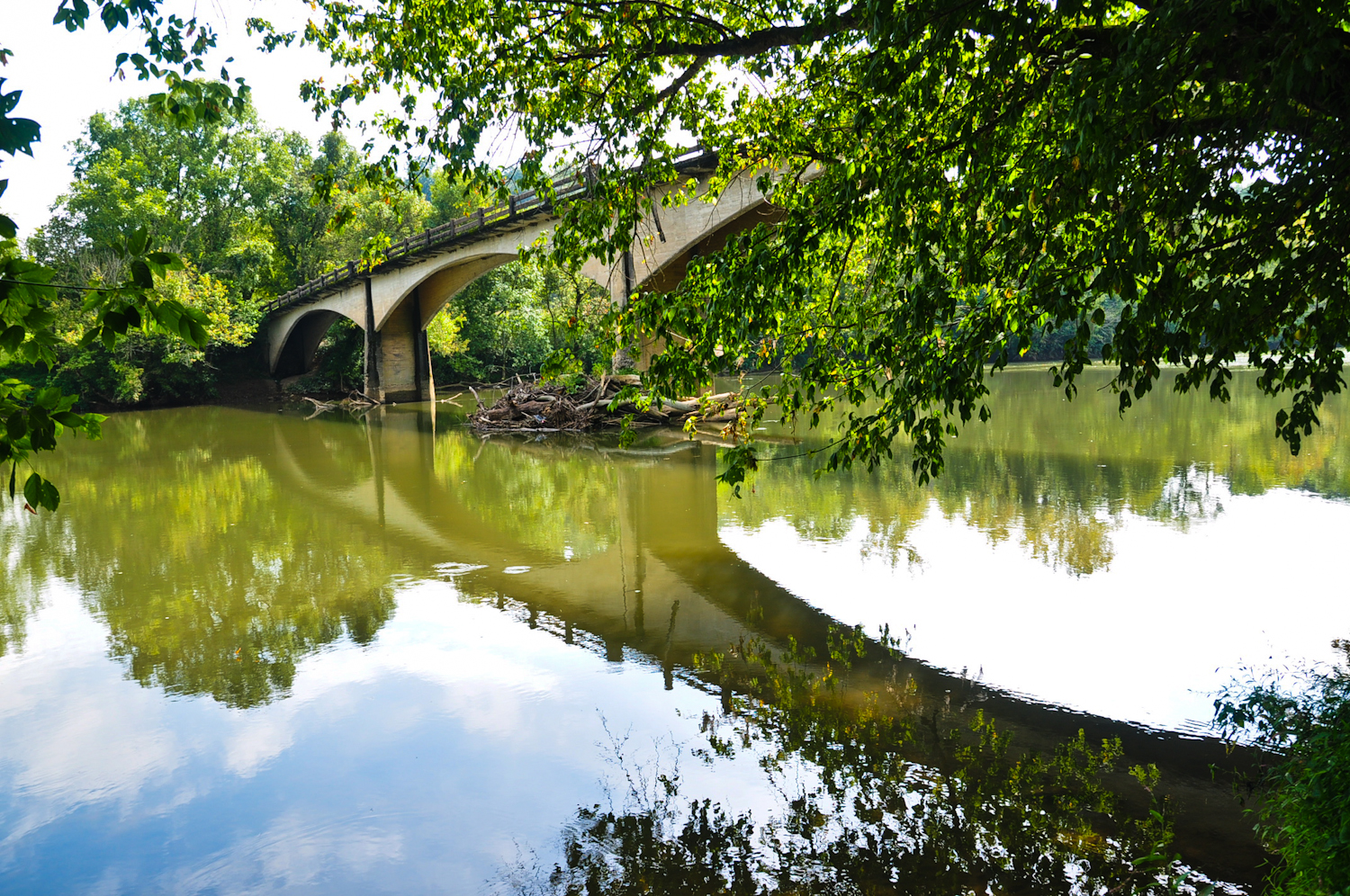

The Conway Bridge was a historic road bridge that crossed the Nolichucky River between Greene County and Cocke County, Tennessee. It had also been known as Nolichucky River Bridge, as Bridge at Bird Hill, as Birds Hill Bridge and as Bridge at Conway Ferry.

It was built in 1924–5 to replace the Conway Ferry that crossed the river at that site. The ferry was replaced by a bridge when the construction of the upstream Nolichucky Dam changed the water level in the river.

A four-span closed-spandrel arch bridge, it was built by the Steel and Lebby Bridge Co. of Knoxville. It was listed on the National Register of Historic Places in 2009.

The bridge was washed away by flooding caused by Hurricane Helene in September 2024, and was subsequently removed from the National Register.
