= Briar Thicket, Tennessee =

- Unincorporated community
- Location within Tennessee Location within the United States
- Coordinates: 36°06′35″N 83°07′43″W
- Country: United States
- State: Tennessee
- County: Cocke
- Elevation: 1,093 ft (333 m)
- Time zone: UTC-5 (Eastern (EST))
  - Summer (DST): UTC-4 (EDT)
- Area code: 423
- GNIS feature ID: 1278318

Briar Thicket is an unincorporated community in Cocke County, Tennessee, United States.

The historic Conway Bridge is located near Briar Thicket.
