= Afton, Tennessee =

Afton
- Unincorporated community
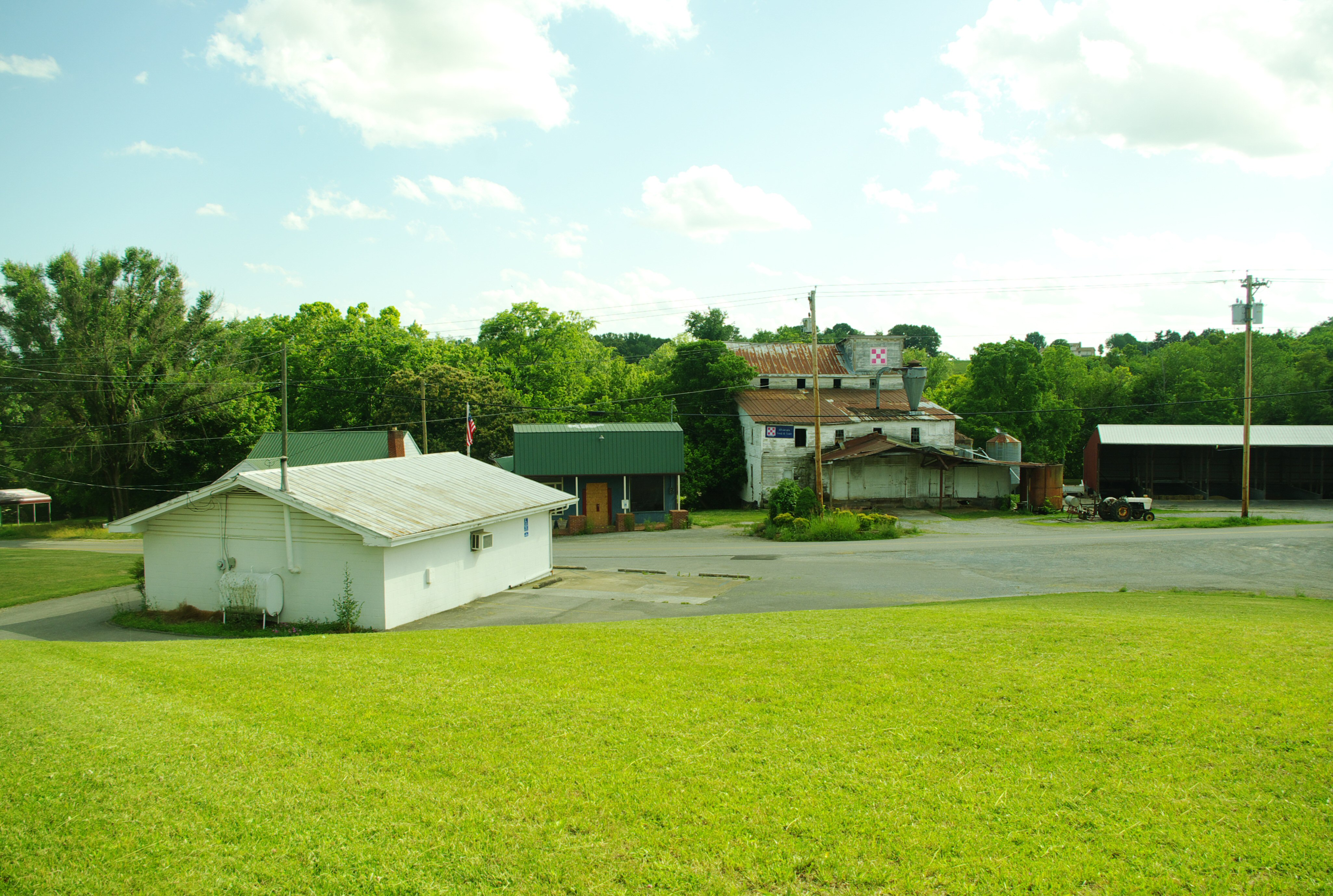

- Location within Tennessee Location within the United States
- Coordinates: 36°11′38″N 82°44′20″W
- Country: United States
- State: Tennessee
- County: Greene
- Elevation: 1,463 ft (446 m)
- Time zone: UTC-5 (Eastern (EST))
  - Summer (DST): UTC-4 (EDT)
- ZIP code: 37616
- Area code: 423
- GNIS feature ID: 1304773

Afton is an unincorporated community in Greene County, Tennessee.

== Toponymy ==
It is believed that the community's name comes from Robert Burns's song "Sweet Afton", about the River Afton in Scotland.

== History ==
In the early 1960s, construction began on a new U.S. Post Office in Afton. It was built by Modern Woodman of America.

== Geography ==
Afton's "downtown" area is located along Afton Road just north of US Routes 11E/321, however the Afton zip code includes areas along Tennessee State Routes 93, 107, 172 and 351.

Some of Afton has been annexed by the town of Greeneville and the city of Tusculum.

== Attractions and amenities ==
Middle Creek Blueberry Farm is a u-pick farm that grows blueberries, strawberries, blackberries and raspberries. The farm is currently closed.

== Education ==
There are two schools in Afton, Chuckey-Doak Middle School, and Chuckey-Doak High School.
